= List of classical pianists =

This is an alphabetized list of notable solo pianists who play (or played) classical music on the piano. For those who worked with other pianists as piano duos, see List of classical piano duos (performers). For a list of recorded classical pianists, see List of classical pianists (recorded).

== A ==
=== Ab-Am ===
- Behzod Abduraimov
- Ludwig Abeille
- Jacques Abram
- Adolovni Acosta
- Armenta Adams
- Daniel Adni
- Adrian Aeschbacher
- Valery Afanassiev
- Guido Agosti
- Pierre-Laurent Aimard
- Webster Aitken
- Nelly Akopian-Tamarina
- Giuseppe Albanese
- Isaac Albéniz
- Pedro Albéniz
- Eugen d'Albert
- Charlie Albright
- Dmitri Alexeev
- Charles-Valentin Alkan
- Victor Aller
- Ilse von Alpenheim
- Louis Demetrius Alvanis
- Stefan Ammer
- Carl Arnold

=== An-Az ===
- Géza Anda
- Piotr Anderszewski
- Leif Ove Andsnes
- Usman Anees
- Nicholas Angelich
- Agustin Anievas
- Eteri Andjaparidze
- Charles-François Angelet
- Conrad Ansorge
- Jean-François Antonioli
- Mireya Arboleda
- Anton Arensky
- Martha Argerich
- Kit Armstrong
- Yvonne Arnaud
- Claudio Arrau
- Lydia Artymiw
- Şahan Arzruni
- Vladimir Ashkenazy
- Stefan Askenase
- Lola Astanova
- Ebba d'Aubert
- Lera Auerbach
- Adele aus der Ohe
- Myriam Avalos
- Yulianna Avdeeva
- Valda Aveling
- Emanuel Ax
- Nadia Azzi

== B ==
=== Bab-Ban ===
- Sergei Babayan
- Stanley Babin
- Victor Babin
- Carl Philipp Emanuel Bach
- Johann Sebastian Bach
- Gina Bachauer
- Walter Bache
- Agathe Backer-Grøndahl
- Fridtjof Backer-Grøndahl
- Wilhelm Backhaus
- Farhad Badalbeyli
- Paul Badura-Skoda
- Ryszard Bakst
- Mily Balakirev
- Dalton Baldwin
- Ernő Balogh
- Artur Balsam
- Joseph Banowetz

=== Bar-Bay ===
- Daniel Barenboim
- Simon Barere
- David Bar-Illan
- Trevor Barnard
- Inon Barnatan
- Rami Bar-Niv
- Nerine Barrett
- Karl Heinrich Barth
- Martin James Bartlett
- Béla Bartók
- Marmaduke Barton
- Dmitri Bashkirov
- Leon Bates
- Harold Bauer
- Paul Baumgartner
- Jean-Efflam Bavouzet
- Emanuel Bay

=== Beb-Beu ===
- Betty Humby Beecham
- Ludwig van Beethoven
- Victor Bendix
- William Sterndale Bennett
- Nelly Ben-Or
- Boris Berezovsky
- Martin Berkofsky
- Ludmila Berlinskaya
- Bart Berman
- Boris Berman
- Lazar Berman
- Yara Bernette
- Leonard Bernstein
- Henri Bertini
- Raffi Besalyan
- Stephen Beus

=== Bi-Bl ===
- Philippe Bianconi
- Fabio Bidini
- Malcolm Bilson
- Malcolm Binns
- İdil Biret
- Tessa Birnie
- Hans Bischoff
- Jonathan Biss
- Georges Bizet
- William Black
- Rafał Blechacz
- Aline Reese Blondner
- Fannie Bloomfield Zeisler
- Felix Blumenfeld
- Felicja Blumental
- Daniel Blumenthal

=== Bo ===
- Mary Louise Boehm
- Gergely Bogányi
- Jorge Bolet
- Stefano Bollani
- Marie-Léontine Bordes-Pène
- Victor Borge
- Sergei Bortkiewicz
- Leonard Borwick
- Coenraad V. Bos
- Geir Botnen
- Nadia Boulanger
- Hendrik Bouman
- Andreas Boyde
- Emma Boynet

=== Bra-Bru ===
- Vera Bradford
- Alexander Braginsky
- Johannes Brahms
- Alexander Brailowsky
- Frank Braley
- Natan Brand
- Louis Brassin
- Jens Harald Bratlie
- Elisabeth Brauss
- Ronald Brautigam
- Alice Verne-Bredt
- Alfred Brendel
- Jim Brickman
- Benjamin Britten
- Kenny Broberg
- Yefim Bronfman
- Edwin Orion Brownell
- John Browning
- Bruce Brubaker
- Edoardo Bruni
- Theo Bruins
- Ignaz Brüll

=== Bu-By ===
- Rudolf Buchbinder
- Sara Davis Buechner
- Richard Buhlig
- Hans von Bülow
- Josef Bulva
- Khatia Buniatishvili
- Stanislav Bunin
- Johann Friedrich Franz Burgmüller
- Geoffrey Burleson
- Winifred Burston
- Ammiel Bushakevitz
- Ferruccio Busoni
- Winifred Byrd

== C ==
- Sofia Cabruja
- Sarah Cahill
- Michele Campanella
- Rose Cannabich
- Bruno Canino
- John Carmichael
- Roberto Carnevale
- Teresa Carreño
- Gaby Casadesus
- Jean Casadesus
- Robert Casadesus
- Gianluca Cascioli
- Ricardo Castro
- Boris Cepeda

=== Ch-Cl ===
- Bertrand Chamayou
- Cécile Chaminade
- Angelin Chang
- Fenia Chang
- Nellie Chaplin
- Abram Chasins
- Chen Sa
- Angela Cheng
- Cheng Wai
- Shura Cherkassky
- Milana Chernyavska
- Rachel Cheung
- Jan Chiapusso
- Joan Chissell
- Gian Paolo Chiti
- Seong-Jin Cho
- Saeyoon Chon
- Frédéric Chopin
- Daniel Chorzempa
- Chow Ching Lie
- Winifred Christie
- Alton Chung Ming Chan
- Marcel Ciampi
- Dino Ciani
- Aldo Ciccolini
- Tamara Anna Cislowska
- Wilhelmine Clauss-Szarvady
- Muzio Clementi
- Van Cliburn
- France Clidat
- Julia Cload

=== Coa-Cop ===
- Leon Coates
- Theodor Coccius
- Julian Cochran
- Arnaldo Cohen
- Harriet Cohen
- Naida Cole
- Jean-Philippe Collard
- Stephen Colletti
- Graziella Concas
- Claudio Constantini
- Sylvia Constantinidis
- John Contiguglia
- Richard Contiguglia
- Stephen Coombs
- Gary Cooper
- Imogen Cooper
- Aaron Copland

=== Cor-Cz ===
- Alfred Cortot
- Romola Costantino
- Henry Cowell
- Johann Baptist Cramer
- Patrick Crommelynck
- Tan Crone
- Jill Crossland
- Lamar Crowson
- Adlan Cruz
- José Cubiles
- Richard Cudmore
- Sir Clifford Curzon
- Halina Czerny-Stefańska
- Carl Czerny
- György Cziffra

== D ==
=== Da-De ===
- Dang Thai Son
- Edward Dannreuther
- Jeanne-Marie Darré
- Fanny Davies
- Bella Davidovich
- Ivan Davis
- Karin Dayas
- William Dayas
- Jozef De Beenhouwer
- Claude Debussy
- Sylviane Deferne
- Cor de Groot
- Steven De Groote
- Élie-Miriam Delaborde
- Eduardo Delgado
- Adelina de Lara
- Jörg Demus
- Jeremy Denk
- Alicia de Larrocha
- Vladimir de Pachmann
- Nikolai Demidenko
- William Denis Browne

=== Di-Du ===
- Anthony di Bonaventura
- Misha Dichter
- Louis Diémer
- Simone Dinnerstein
- Paul Doguereau
- Ernő Dohnányi
- Peter Donohoe
- Ania Dorfmann
- Barry Douglas
- Marylène Dosse
- Alexander Dreyschock
- Danny Driver
- Vladimir Drozdov
- Zbigniew Drzewiecki
- Jean Dubé
- Florence Kirsch Du Brul
- François-René Duchâble
- Jan Ladislav Dussek

== E ==
=== Ec-Em ===
- Severin von Eckardstein
- Bracha Eden
- Richard Egarr
- Pavel Egorov
- Youri Egorov
- Violetta Egorova
- Severin Eisenberger
- Detlev Eisinger
- Abdel Rahman El Bacha
- Dror Elimelech

=== En-Ez ===
- Michael Endres
- Per Enflo
- Karl Engel
- Philippe Entremont
- Julius Epstein
- Tzvi Erez
- Christoph Eschenbach
- Morton Estrin
- Róża Etkin-Moszkowska
- Lindley Evans

== F ==
=== Fa-Fl ===
- Mikhaïl Faerman
- Joel Fan
- Edith Farnadi
- Richard Farrell
- Iain Farrington
- Anna Fedorova
- José Feghali
- Samuil Feinberg
- Till Fellner
- Vladimir Feltsman
- Albert Ferber
- Arthur Ferrante
- Jacques Février
- Janina Fialkowska
- John Field
- James Henry Fields
- Margaret Fingerhut
- Sergio Fiorentino
- Rudolf Firkušný
- Annie Fischer
- Edith Fischer
- Caroline Fischer
- Edwin Fischer
- Norma Fisher
- Philip Edward Fisher
- Graham Fitch
- Leon Fleisher
- Yakov Flier
- Ingrid Fliter

=== Fo-Fu ===
- Andor Földes
- Grace Fong
- Julian Fontana
- Bengt Forsberg
- W. O. Forsyth
- Fou Ts'ong
- Felix Fox
- Malcolm Frager
- Homero Francesch
- Samson François
- Massimiliano Frani
- Claude Frank
- Peter Frankl
- Justus Frantz
- David Fray
- Nelson Freire
- Etelka Freund
- Carl Friedberg
- Arthur Friedheim
- Ignaz Friedman
- Mao Fujita
- Margarita Fyodorova

== G ==
=== Ga-Gl ===
- Ossip Gabrilowitsch
- Henriette Gaertner
- Neil Galanter
- Rudolph Ganz
- Umi Garrett
- Mark Gasser
- Ivana Gavrić
- Andrei Gavrilov
- Alexander Gavrylyuk
- Heinrich Gebhard
- Kemal Gekić
- Bruno Leonardo Gelber
- Ingrid Fuzjko V. Georgii-Hemming
- Kirill Gerstein
- Carmen Geutjes
- Alexander Ghindin
- Jack Gibbons
- Walter Gieseking
- Emil Gilels
- Rhondda Gillespie
- Boris Giltburg
- Jakob Gimpel
- Pavel Gintov
- Grigory Ginzburg
- Katrine Gislinge
- Frank Glazer
- Reinhold Glière
- Marija Gluvakov

=== Go ===
- Arabella Goddard
- Leopold Godowsky
- Mona Golabek
- Edward Gold
- Aleksandr Goldenweiser
- Rubin Goldmark
- Robert Goldsand
- Stefano Golinelli
- Alexis Golovin
- David Golub
- Richard Goode
- Isador Goodman
- Judith Gordon
- Daniel Gortler
- Ralf Gothóni
- Louis Moreau Gottschalk
- Glenn Gould
- Anna Gourari

=== Gr-Gu ===
- Enrique Graf
- Gary Graffman
- Alasdair Graham
- Percy Grainger
- Enrique Granados
- Jeffrey Grice
- Edvard Grieg
- Hélène Grimaud
- Maria Grinberg
- Bonnie Gritton
- Samuel Grodin
- Andreas Groethuysen
- Benjamin Grosvenor
- Shengying Gu
- Alberto Guerrero
- Friedrich Gulda
- Youra Guller
- Horacio Gutiérrez
- Nino Gvetadze
- László Gyimesi

== H ==
=== Ha ===
- Monique Haas
- Werner Haas
- Ingrid Haebler
- Andreas Haefliger
- Reynaldo Hahn
- Sir Charles Hallé
- Adolph Hallis
- Mark Hambourg
- Leonid Hambro
- Marc-André Hamelin
- Ambre Hammond
- Adam Harasiewicz
- Frits Hartvigson
- Michael Kieran Harvey
- Clara Haskil
- Joyce Hatto
- Walter Hautzig
- Joseph Haydn

=== He-Hi ===
- Inna Heifetz
- Claude Helffer
- David Helfgott
- Stephen Heller
- Martin Helmchen
- Gerard Hengeveld
- Dennis Hennig
- Adolf von Henselt
- Henri Herz
- Dame Myra Hess
- Barbara Hesse-Bukowska
- Angela Hewitt
- Peter Hill
- Eric Himy

=== Ho-Hu ===
- Magdalene Ho
- Rex Hobcroft
- Ian Hobson
- Josef Hofmann
- Margarita Höhenrieder
- Lorin Hollander
- Otakar Hollmann
- Vladimir Horowitz
- Mieczysław Horszowski
- Andrej Hoteev
- Stephen Hough
- Alan Hovhaness
- Leslie Howard
- Philip Howard
- Daniel Hsu
- Ching-Yun Hu
- Yvonne Hubert
- Johann Nepomuk Hummel
- Bruce Hungerford
- Anastasia Huppmann

== I ==
- Valentina Igoshina
- Konstantin Igumnov
- Ivan Ilić
- Jos Van Immerseel
- Ingmar Piano Duo
- Stanislav Ioudenitch
- Clelia Iruzun
- Yoram Ish-Hurwitz
- Eugene Istomin
- Kei Itoh
- Amparo Iturbi
- José Iturbi
- Antonio Iturrioz
- Christian Ivaldi
- Andrei Ivanovitch

== J ==
=== Ja-Je ===
- Peter Jablonski
- Paul Jacobs
- Katarzyna Jaczynowska
- Zoran G. Jančić
- Jenő Jandó
- Byron Janis
- Tasso Janopoulo
- Rudolf Jansen
- Gintaras Januševičius
- Adolf Jensen
- José Manuel Jiménez Berroa

=== Jo-Ju ===
- Grant Johannesen
- Gunnar Johansen
- Jovianney Emmanuel Cruz
- Graham Johnson
- Henry Jolles
- Maryla Jonas
- Rafael Joseffy
- Bradley Joseph
- William Joseph
- Geneviève Joy
- Eileen Joyce
- Scott Joplin
- Terence Judd
- Joonatan Jürgenson

== K ==
=== Ka ===
- Ilona Kabos
- Jeffrey Kahane
- Percy Kahn
- Joseph Kalichstein
- Gilbert Kalish
- Friedrich Kalkbrenner
- William Kapell
- David Kaplan
- Richard Kapp
- Jozef Kapustka
- Danae Kara
- Natalia Karp
- Yakov Kasman
- Andrey Kasparov
- Julius Katchen
- Peter Katin
- Cyprien Katsaris
- Amir Katz
- Martin Katz
- Mindru Katz
- Milton Kaye

=== Ke-Kl ===
- Constance Keene
- Simone Keller
- Freddy Kempf
- Wilhelm Kempff
- Sean Kennard
- Kevin Kenner
- Louis Kentner
- Olga Kern
- Mikhail Kerzelli
- Minuetta Kessler
- Eugène Ketterer
- Stanislav Khegai
- Frederick B. Kiddle
- Edward Kilenyi
- Gary Kirkpatrick
- John Kirkpatrick
- Anatole Kitain
- Margaret Kitchin
- Evgeny Kissin
- Dmitri Klebanov
- Elisabeth Klein
- Jacques Klein
- Walter Klien
- Paul Klengel

=== Ko-Kr ===
- Aimi Kobayashi
- Alexander Kobrin
- Tobias Koch
- Zoltán Kocsis
- Raoul (von) Koczalski
- Mari Kodama
- Alan Kogosowski
- Lubka Kolessa
- Alfons Kontarsky
- Aloys Kontarsky
- Anton de Kontski
- Alexander Korsantia
- Michael Korstick
- Jason Kouchak
- Giorgio Koukl
- Stephen Kovacevich
- Leopold Koželuch
- Vladimir Krainev
- Lili Kraus
- Martin Krause
- Anna Kravtchenko
- Gustav Kross
- Vladimir Krpan

=== Ku-Ky ===
- Antonín Kubálek
- Anton Kuerti
- Friedrich Kuhlau
- Theodor Kullak
- Miroslav Kultyshev
- Eduard Kunz
- Vilém Kurz
- Elena Kuschnerova
- Christiaan Kuyvenhoven
- Leonid Kuzmin
- Radoslav Kvapil
- Rena Kyriakou

== L ==
=== La ===
- Katia Labèque
- Marielle Labèque
- Carl Lachmund
- Carles Lama
- Frederic Lamond
- Geoffrey Lancaster
- Walter Landauer
- Wanda Landowska
- Piers Lane
- Lang Lang
- Milan Langer
- Cosimo Damiano Lanza
- Ruth Laredo
- Ervin László
- Jacob Lateiner
- Risto Lauriala
- Franz Lauska
- Horacio Lavandera
- Ingmar Lazar
- George-Emmanuel Lazaridis
- Igor Lazko

=== Le ===
- Ka Ling Colleen Lee
- Denoe Leedy
- Reinbert de Leeuw
- Ralph Leopold
- Christian Leotta
- Theodor Leschetizky
- Daniel Lessner
- Ray Lev
- Eric Le Van
- Oscar Levant
- Beth Levin
- Robert Levin
- Robert D. Levin
- James Levine
- Igor Levit
- Mischa Levitzki
- Daniel Levy
- Ernst Levy
- Raymond Lewenthal
- Paul Lewis

=== Lh-Li ===
- Josef Lhévinne
- Rosina Lhévinne
- George Li
- Ming Qiang Li
- Li Yundi
- Liberace
- Cecile Licad
- John Lill
- Yunchan Lim
- Arthur Moreira Lima
- Christiana Lin
- Jenny Lin
- Dinu Lipatti
- Jan Lisiecki
- Valentina Lisitsa
- James Lisney
- Eugene List
- Barbara Lister-Sink
- Franz Liszt
- Bruce Liu
- Kate Liu

=== Lo ===
- Peter Lockwood
- Nicolai Lomov
- Kathleen Long
- Marguerite Long
- Thomas Lorango
- Roger Lord
- Wolfram Lorenzen
- Yvonne Loriod
- Louis Lortie
- Iris Loveridge
- Anne Lovett
- Jerome Lowenthal

=== Lu-Ly ===
- Alexei Lubimov
- Nikolai Lugansky
- Jean-Marc Luisada
- Radu Lupu
- Witold Lutosławski
- Sergei Lyapunov
- Moura Lympany
- Charles Lynch
- Clive Lythgoe

== M ==
=== Maa-Mal ===
- Edward MacDowell
- Joanna MacGregor
- Geoffrey Douglas Madge
- Aleksandar Madžar
- Nikita Magaloff
- Frederik Magle
- Désiré Magnus
- Petronel Malan
- Krzysztof Malek
- Anna Malikova
- Witold Małcużyński

=== Mar–Maz ===
- Rosario Marciano
- Adele Marcus
- Irén Marik
- Richard Markham
- Ozan Marsh
- Oleg Marshev
- Philip Martin
- Malcolm Martineau
- João Carlos Martins
- Giuseppe Martucci
- Jean-Pierre Marty
- Eduard Marxsen
- William Mason
- William Masselos
- Draga Matković
- Denis Matsuev
- Colette Maze

=== Mc-Mi ===
- Edwin McArthur
- Stephanie McCallum
- Leon McCawley
- Anne-Marie McDermott
- Murray McLachlan
- Nikolai Medtner
- Felix Mendelssohn
- Hephzibah Menuhin
- Yaltah Menuhin
- Susan Merdinger
- Yolanda Mero
- Janne Mertanen
- Victor Merzhanov
- Noel Mewton-Wood
- Marcelle Meyer
- Stefano Miceli
- Aleksander Michałowski
- Arturo Benedetti Michelangeli
- Miloš Mihajlović
- Karol Mikuli
- Kenneth G. Mills
- Hamish Milne
- Martha Mier

=== Mo-Mu ===
- Benno Moiseiwitsch
- Gabriela Montero
- Sergio Monteiro
- Emánuel Moór
- Gerald Moore
- Ivan Moravec
- Harold Morris
- Ignaz Moscheles
- Jurij Moskvitin
- Moritz Moszkowski
- Franz Xaver Wolfgang Mozart
- Wolfgang Amadeus Mozart
- Ian Munro
- Mieczysław Munz
- William Murdoch
- Julien Musafia
- Olli Mustonen

== N ==
=== Na-Ne ===
- Jon Nakamatsu
- Alexei Nasedkin
- Soheil Nasseri
- Yves Nat
- Vladimir Natanson
- Eldar Nebolsin
- Anton Nel
- Pascal Nemirovski
- Heinrich Neuhaus
- Edmund Neupert
- Ethelbert Nevin
- Anthony Newman
- Elly Ney

=== Ni-Ny ===
- Reid Nibley
- Francesco Nicolosi
- Stanislas Niedzielski
- Mitja Nikisch
- Tatiana Nikolayeva
- Andrei Nikolsky
- Sungsuk Noh
- David Owen Norris
- Eunice Norton
- Gustav Nottebohm
- Guiomar Novaes
- Marie Novello
- Theodosia Ntokou
- Ervin Nyiregyházi

== O ==
- Lev Oborin
- John O'Conor
- John Ogdon
- Garrick Ohlsson
- Santos Ojeda
- David Ezra Okonşar
- Janusz Olejniczak
- Ferhan Önder
- Ferzan Önder
- Bart van Oort
- Ursula Oppens
- Gerhard Oppitz
- Christopher O'Riley
- Nikolai Orlov
- József Örmény
- Leo Ornstein
- Rafael Orozco
- Cristina Ortiz
- Steven Osborne
- Alexander Osminin
- Clio-Danae Othoneou
- Henrique Oswald
- Cécile Ousset
- Vladimir Ovchinnikov

== P ==
=== Pa ===
- Enrico Pace
- Vladimir de Pachmann
- Ignacy Jan Paderewski
- Kun-Woo Paik
- Natasha Paremski
- Jon Kimura Parker
- Natalya Pasichnyk
- Ernst Pauer
- Victor Paukstelis

=== Pe-Pi ===
- Güher Pekinel
- Süher Pekinel
- Bruno Peltre
- Leonard Pennario
- Murray Perahia
- Henriette von Pereira-Arnstein
- Neal Peres Da Costa
- Alfredo Perl
- Vlado Perlemuter
- Vincent Persichetti
- Yella Pessl
- Egon Petri
- Christina Petrowska-Quilico
- Carlos Alfredo Peyrellade
- Isidor Philipp
- Andrzej Pikul
- Cecilia Pillado
- George Pinto
- Maria João Pires
- Johann Peter Pixis
- Artur Pizarro

=== Pl-Po ===
- Francis Planté
- Mikhail Pletnev
- Ignaz Pleyel
- Jonathan Plowright
- Friderika Podgornik
- Leo Podolsky
- Ivo Pogorelić
- François-Xavier Poizat
- Daniel Pollack
- Francesco Pollini
- Maurizio Pollini
- Jean-Bernard Pommier
- Antonio Pompa-Baldi
- Michael Ponti
- Roland Pöntinen
- Tiffany Poon
- Stephen Portman
- Paul Posnak
- Viktoria Postnikova
- Cipriani Potter
- Harrison Potter
- Leff Pouishnoff
- Francis Poulenc
- Jonathan Powell
- Lloyd Powell

=== Pr-Pu ===
- Awadagin Pratt
- Menahem Pressler
- André Previn
- Vassily Primakov
- Paul Procopolis
- Sergei Prokofiev
- Roland Pröll
- Roberto Prosseda
- Svetla Protich
- Raoul Pugno

== Q ==
- Anne Queffélec

== R ==
=== Ra-Re ===
- Alexander Raab
- Roman Rabinovich
- Valentin Radu
- Sergei Rachmaninoff
- Ezra Rachlin
- Thomas Rajna
- Beatrice Rana
- Dezső Ránki
- Siegfried Rapp
- Michael Raucheisen
- Maurice Ravel
- Marjan Rawicz
- Alexander Raytchev
- Walter Rehberg
- Carl Reinecke
- Julius Reubke
- Lívia Rév
- Eliane Reyes

=== Ri ===
- Sviatoslav Richter
- Hans Richter-Haaser
- Ferdinand Ries
- Herman Rietzel
- Riopy
- Bernard Ringeissen
- Diana Ringo
- Édouard Risler
- Anastasia Rizikov

=== Ro-Rz ===
- Bernard Roberts
- John Robilette
- Santiago Rodriguez
- Pascal Rogé
- Michael Roll
- Helmut Roloff
- Aleksandra Romanić
- Sir Landon Ronald
- Julius Röntgen
- Martin Roscoe
- Jerome Rose
- Charles Rosen
- Carol Rosenberger
- Moriz Rosenthal
- Nicholas Roth
- Jacques Rouvier
- Mūza Rubackytė
- Anton Rubinstein
- Arthur Rubinstein
- Nikolai Rubinstein
- Bernhard Ruchti
- Mikhail Rudy
- James Russo
- Frans van Ruth
- Frederic Rzewski

== S ==
=== Sa ===
- Geoffrey Saba
- Vasily Safonov
- Camille Saint-Saëns
- Anton Salnikov
- Pnina Salzman
- Olga Samaroff
- Adnan Sami
- Harold Samuel
- György Sándor
- Victor Sangiorgio
- Jesús María Sanromá
- Arthur Napoleão dos Santos
- Wassily Sapellnikoff
- Erik Satie
- Emil von Sauer
- Amandine Savary
- Jean-Marc Savelli
- Marko Savić
- Fazıl Say

=== Sca-Schm ===
- Domenico Scarlatti
- Pietro Scarpini
- Irene Scharrer
- Xaver Scharwenka
- Konstantin Scherbakov
- Ann Schein Carlyss
- Olga Scheps
- Valentin Schiedermair
- András Schiff
- Madeline Schiller
- Victor Schiøler
- Steffen Schleiermacher
- Burkard Schliessmann
- Peter Schmalfuss
- Helmut Schmidt
- Johan Schmidt
- E. Robert Schmitz

==== Schn-Schw ====
- Artur Schnabel
- Karl Ulrich Schnabel
- Andre-Michel Schub
- Franz Schubert
- Clara Schumann
- Robert Schumann
- Ludwig Schuncke
- Arminda Schutte

=== Sci-Sg ===
- Giacomo Scinardo
- Hazel Scott
- Alexander Scriabin
- Isidor Seiss
- Kathryn Selby
- Blanche Selva
- Peter Serkin
- Rudolf Serkin
- Dimitris Sgouros
- Timur Selçuk

=== Sh-Si ===
- Regina Shamvili
- Barbara Shearer
- Mordecai Shehori
- Howard Shelley
- Anatoly Sheludyakov
- Roy Shepherd
- Russell Sherman
- Norman Shetler
- Dmitry Shishkin
- Dmitri Shostakovich
- Bella Shteinbuk
- Leonard Shure
- Clara Isabella Siegle
- Valery Sigalevitch
- Antti Siirala
- Béla Síki
- Alexander Siloti
- Abbey Simon
- Leo Sirota
- Larry Sitsky

=== Sl-Sr ===
- Heather Slade-Lipkin
- Ruth Slenczynska
- Alexander Slobodyanik
- Lindsay Sloper
- Sigurd Slåttebrekk
- Regina Smendzianka
- Jan Smeterlin
- Leo Smit
- Cyril Smith
- Ronald Smith
- Sydney Smith
- Wibi Soerjadi
- Vladimir Sofronitsky
- Grigory Sokolov
- Ivan Sokolov
- Juan María Solare
- Solomon
- Yeol Eum Son
- Wonny Song
- Kaikhosru Shapurji Sorabji
- Gonzalo Soriano
- Jaap Spaanderman
- Pietro Spada
- Dubravka Tomšič Srebotnjak

=== St ===
- Peter Stadlen
- Martin Stadtfeld
- Andreas Staier
- Fanny Stål
- Camille-Marie Stamaty
- Jasminka Stančul
- Susan Starr
- Bernhard Stavenhagen
- Daniel Steibelt
- Pavel Štěpán
- Ilona Štěpánová-Kurzová
- Edna Stern
- Eduard Steuermann
- Ronald Stevenson
- Johanne Stockmarr
- Zygmunt Stojowski
- Kathryn Stott
- August Stradal
- Soulima Stravinsky

=== Su-Sz ===
- Szuyu Rachel Su
- Evelyn Suart
- Yevgeny Sudbin
- Iyad Sughayer
- Ananda Sukarlan
- Grete Sultan
- Alexei Sultanov
- Sun Meiting
- Sun Yingdi
- Yekwon Sunwoo
- Rose and Ottilie Sutro
- Alexander Sverjensky
- Yevgeny Svetlanov
- Ruslan Sviridov
- David Syme
- Roberto Szidon
- Balázs Szokolay
- Władysław Szpilman

== T ==
=== Ta-Th ===
- Gabriel Tacchino
- Yaara Tal
- Magda Tagliaferro
- Mark Taimanov
- Alexander Tamir
- Alexandre Tansman
- Sergei Tarnowsky
- Karl Tausig
- Christopher Taylor
- Simon Tedeschi
- Louis Teicher
- Gerardo Teissonniere
- Thomas Tellefsen
- Alfred Teltschik
- Per Tengstrand
- Sigismond Thalberg
- Károly Thern
- Louis Thern
- Willi Thern
- Jean-Yves Thibaudet
- François-Joël Thiollier
- Penelope Thwaites

=== Ti-Ty ===
- Ignaz Tiegerman
- Sergio Tiempo
- Vera Timanova
- James Tocco
- Václav Tomášek
- Alexander Toradze
- Donald Tovey
- Geoffrey Tozer
- Max Trapp
- Daniil Trifonov
- Simon Trpčeski
- Valerie Tryon
- Richard Aaker Trythall
- Emahoy Tsegué-Maryam Guèbrou
- Nobuyuki Tsujii
- David Tudor
- Józef Turczyński
- Ronald Turini
- Rosalyn Tureck
- Tarja Turunen
- Anderson Tyrer
- Hélène Tysman

== U ==
- Mitsuko Uchida
- Ayako Uehara
- Emilia Uggla
- Alexander Uninsky
- Rem Urasin
- Roberto Urbay

== V ==
=== Va-Ve ===
- Mariangela Vacatello
- Vladimir Valjarević
- John Vallier
- Nick van Bloss
- Arie Vardi
- Tamás Vásáry
- Ester Vela
- Eulalia Vela
- Giovanni Velluti
- Ilana Vered
- Adela Verne
- Mathilde Verne
- Matthijs Verschoor

=== Vi-Vr ===
- José Vianna da Motta
- Vladimir Viardo
- Roger Vignoles
- Ivan Vihor
- Joseph Villa
- Ricardo Viñes
- Anastasia Virsaladze
- Eliso Virsaladze
- Stefan Vladar
- Pancho Vladigerov
- Oleg Volkov
- Alexei Volodin
- Arcadi Volodos
- Andrew von Oeyen
- Franz Vorraber
- Ralph Votapek
- Vitya Vronsky

== W ==
=== Wa ===
- Elena Waiss
- Althea Waites
- Émile Waldteufel
- Ernest Walker
- William Vincent Wallace
- Peter Wallfisch
- Bruno Walter
- Yuja Wang
- Andrzej Wasowski
- Huw Watkins
- André Watts

=== We-Wn ===
- Beveridge Webster
- Nancy Weir
- Alan Weiss
- Orion Weiss
- Alexis Weissenberg
- Chris Mary Francine Whittle
- Ueli Wiget
- Earl Wild
- Gerard Willems
- Llŷr Williams
- Michael Glenn Williams
- Malcolm Williamson
- Walburga Willmann
- Paul Wittgenstein
- Daniel Wnukowski

=== Wo-Wu ===
- Galina Werschenska
- Joseph Wölfl
- Ernst Victor Wolff
- Joseph Wölfl
- Eleanor Wong
- Roger Woodward
- Bolesław Woytowicz
- Roger Wright
- Ingolf Wunder
- Friedrich Wührer

== X ==
- Di Xiao

== Y ==
- Oxana Yablonskaya
- Marina Yakhlakova
- Ivan Yanakov
- Anna Yesipova
- Ramzi Yassa
- Christine Yoshikawa
- Jeanne You
- Avan Yu
- Maria Yudina
- Yanni
- Yiruma
- Yoshiki

== Z ==
- Franciszek Zachara
- Yakov Zak
- Berenika Zakrzewski
- Evgeny Zarafiants
- Carlo Zecchi
- Dieter Zechlin
- Mark Zeltser
- Justus Zeyen
- Zhu Xiao-Mei
- Igor Zhukov
- Lilya Zilberstein
- Krystian Zimerman
- Tadeusz Żmudziński
- Zhang Zuo
- Nikolai Zverev
- Wojciech Żywny

== See also ==
- List of women classical pianists
