= Pessl =

Pessl is a surname. Notable people with the surname include:

- Marisha Pessl, American writer
- Yella Pessl, American musician
