= Svetlakov =

Svetlakov is a surname. Notable people with the surname include:

- Andrei Svetlakov (born 1996), Russian ice hockey player
- Sergei Svetlakov (born 1977), Russian comedian, film and television actor, TV host, producer, and screenwriter

== See also ==
- Svetlanov
