= Pavlo Gintov =

Ukrainian musician (born 1984)

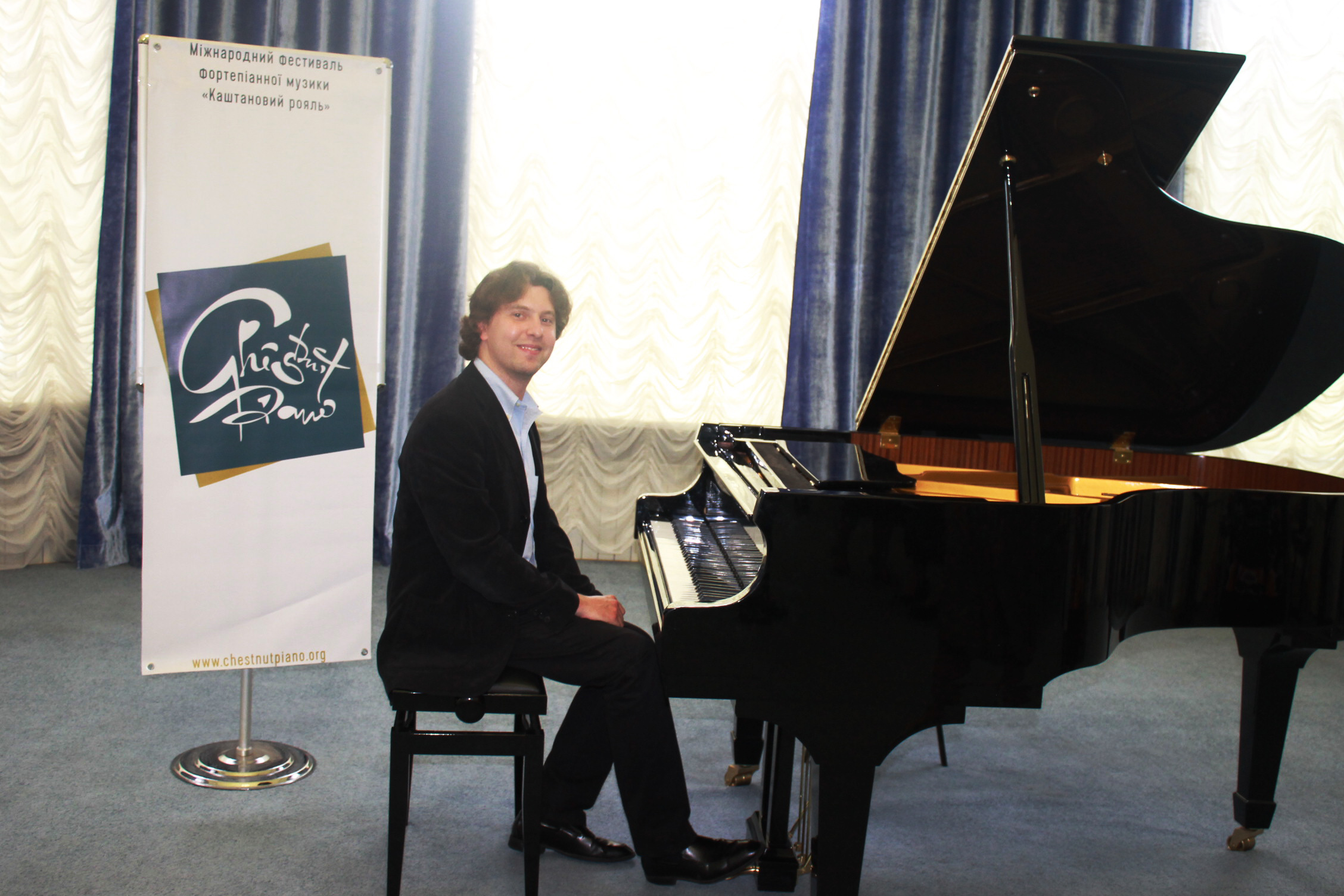

Background information
- Born: January 14, 1984 (age 42); Kyiv, Ukrainian SSR
- Genres: Classical
- Occupation: Pianist
- Instrument: Piano

Pavlo Gintov (Ukrainian: Павло Гiнтов) (born January 14, 1984, in Kyiv, USSR) is a classical pianist. He holds a Doctor of Musical Art degree from the Manhattan School of Music in New York City, where he studied with Nina Svetlanova.

== Education ==
At the age of 6 he started his musical education at Kyiv Central Music School and continued at the Moscow State Conservatory, where he was a student of the proclaimed "Godfather of the Russian piano school" Lev Naumov (custodian of the Heinrich Neuhaus methods that are credited with producing many extraordinary 20th-century Russian keyboard masters such as Gilels and Richter) and his assistant Daniil Kopylov. In 2008 he obtained Master of Music Degree on a full scholarship from the Manhattan School of Music, studying with professor Nina Svetlanova.

== Major performances with orchestra ==
Tokyo Royal Chamber Orchestra, Manhattan Chamber Orchestra, Henderson Symphony Orchestra, Shizuoka Symphony, The Peninsula Music Festival Orchestra, Orchester Berliner Musikfreunde, Campobasso Orchestra Regionale, The State Orchestra of Ukraine.

== Selected stage appearances ==
Weill Recital Hall at Carnegie Hall, New York (2026, 2025, 2024, 2010), Merkin Hall at Kaufman Center, New York (2009), Berlin Philharmonic Hall (2007) Kioi Hall, Tokyo (2007), The Great Hall of Moscow Conservatory (2006), Teatro Verdi Nationale, Milan (2006), St-Petersburg Philharmonic Hall (2003), Kyiv Philharmonic Hall (1999).

== Awards ==
- First prize in the Bradshaw and Buono International Piano Competition (New York, 2010),
- First prize and four special prizes in the premier Takamatsu International Piano Competition (Japan, 2006),
- 3rd prize and prize for the best performance of Tchaikovsky's piece in the Vth International V. Krainev Young Pianists Competition (Kharkov, Ukraine, 2000),
- Diploma in the Moscow Festival of Young Pianists in memory of H. Neuhauz (Moscow, Russia, 1998),
- Grant of the Shevchenko Scientific Society (New York, 2008),
- Full scholarship and stipend grant at the Manhattan School of Music (New York, 2006),
- The Ukrainian President's grant (1998–2001),
- Grant of the Scriabin Fund (Moscow, 1999),
- Grant of the International Charity Programme "New Names" (Moscow, 1998),
- Diploma for the Best Accompanist in the 2nd International Paganini Violin Competition (Moscow, 2004)

== See also ==
- List of classical pianists
