= Yolanda Mero =

Yolanda Mero Mérő Yolanda
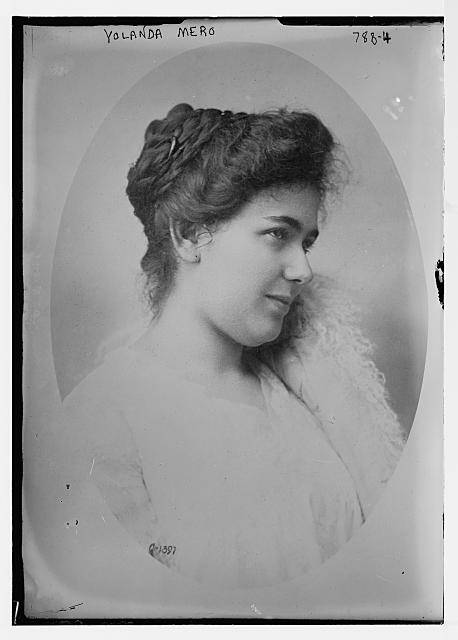

Background information
- Born: August 30, 1887; Budapest, Hungary
- Died: October 17, 1963 (aged 76) New York City, New York, United States
- Genres: classical
- Occupation: Classical pianist
- Instrument: Piano
- Years active: 1902–1963

Yolanda Mero (aka Jolanda Mero; Hungarian spelling Mérő; later Mero-Irion) (30 August 1887 – 17 October 1963) was a Hungarian-American pianist, opera and theatre impresario, and philanthropist who supported destitute musicians.

== Pianist ==
Yolanda Mero was born into a Jewish family in Budapest to Salamon Mérő and Rozalia (née Pick). She began studying at the age of 8 at the National Conservatory with Augusta Rennebaum, a pupil of Franz Liszt. She made her debut at age 15 with the Dresden Philharmonic, then toured the world for four years. She moved to the United States in 1900, first appearing in New York in 1909, with the Russian Symphony Orchestra.

A week after arriving in New York, she met Hermann Irion, an executive of the Steinway Piano company, and married him only four weeks later, on 16 December 1909.

In the US she played concertos under the baton of Gustav Mahler, Leopold Stokowski and others. She later had a teaching post at her alma mater in Budapest.

Her verve and bravura, but also her wayward approach, were noted. In a review of her concert at New York's Aeolian Hall in January 1919, James Huneker wrote that "... she transformed Chopin preludes into veritable typhoons", and "... in the Barcarolle, instead of gondolas and the vows of lovers, moonlight and soft Adriatic zephyrs, we were shown a huge warship that steamed through the Grand Canal, sirens screaming, cannons booming, and a band playing Hungarian Rhapsody by Liszt."

== Recordings ==
Yolanda Mero made a number of piano rolls, of music by Bach, Beethoven, Sergei Bortkiewicz, Cécile Chaminade, Debussy, Dohnányi, Grieg, Handel, Haydn, Liszt, Moszkowski, Mozart, Anton Rubinstein, Schubert, Sinding, Johann Strauss II, Richard Strauss, Tchaikovsky, Max Vogrich and Wagner. She made only one 78 rpm recording.

Sergei Bortkiewicz dedicated his Trois pièces pour piano, Op. 12, to her.

Her recording of Max Vogrich's Staccato-Caprice appears on the CD Women at the Piano: An Anthology of Historic Performances, Vol. 2 (1926-1950). and on Welte-Mignon Piano Rolls, Vol. 1 (1905-1927) It is said to display her "superb finish, beautiful phrasing and exquisite touch". Her recording of Carl Heymann's Elfenspiel, Etude in E major appears on Welte-Mignon Piano Rolls, Vol. 3 (1905-1926). Her playing of Franz Liszt's Hungarian Rhapsody No. 4 is on this video on YouTube, and can also be found on CD.

== Impresario ==
Mme Mero-Irion co-founded the New Opera Company, becoming at that time the world's only female impresario. She chose the repertoire, singers, conductors, artistic and stage directors, ballet masters and coaches. She produced The Merry Widow on Broadway in 1943, with choreography by George Balanchine and starring Jan Kiepura, David Wayne, Robert Rounseville and others, and Marcel Pagnol's play Topaze, starring Tilly Losch, in 1947.

== Radio activist ==
She also became an activist in the cause of improving the quality of the content of radio broadcasts, launching attacks on soap operas and advertising. She was founder and chairman of the Women's National Radio Committee and created the Gold Microphone Award.

== Philanthropist ==
Yolanda Mero-Irion was active in providing support for destitute musicians. She co-founded the Musicians Emergency Fund, along with Olga Samaroff, Lucrezia Bori and the wives of Ernest Schelling and Ernest Hutcheson and was its executive director. She established an endowment with the Musicians Foundation, Inc.

Yolanda Mero-Irion lived with her husband on their estate in Rockland County, NY. She later lived at 983 Park Avenue, New York. She died on 17 October 1963, in Lenox Hill Hospital, aged 76.
