= Anatoly Sheludyakov =

Anatoly Sheludyakov Анатолий Шелудяков
- Born: 1955 (age 70–71); Moscow
- Genre: Classical music
- Occupation: Pianist
- Instrument: Piano
- Label: Naxos
- Website: asheludyakov.com

Anatoly Sheludyakov (Russian: Анатолий Шелудяков, Anatolij Šeludijkov, born 1955) is a classical pianist, composer, Merited Artist of the Russian Federation and member of the Russian Union of Composers.

He was born in Moscow, Russia, where he completed his doctoral studies under professor Anatoly Vedernikov at the Gnesin Institute of Music. He also graduated from the Moscow Conservatory where he studied composition with Tikhon Khrennikov. His works include Variations for Orchestra, Ostinato for Orchestra, String Trio, Five Intermezzi for Percussion, Suite for Violin and Piano, the cantata Brotherhood Songs, vocal cycles.

In 1977 Sheludyakov was the winner of the Russian National Piano Competition. He has performed solo concerts with orchestras, solo recitals, and chamber music performances in prestigious concert halls in Moscow, St. Petersburg, and other major cities in Russia, the U.S., Germany, France, Italy, China, Czechoslovakia, Yugoslavia, and Australia. He has recorded sixteen CDs of piano and chamber music and has performed on Russian television and radio. His repertoire includes many major works for solo piano, piano and orchestra, and piano chamber music of the Baroque, Classical, Romantic, and Contemporary periods.

Anatoly Sheludyakov has served as an assistant professor of piano at the Gnessin Institute of Music and has maintained a private piano studio in Moscow. Anatoly was awarded Honored Artist of Russian Federation in 1999 as well as the Medal of the Government of Moscow in 1997. He is currently an artist-in-residence at the University of Georgia, United States.

Source: adapted from artist's website

== Discography ==
- Joaquin Turina” Complete Sonatas with Betul Soykan, Violin
- A.Glazunov and V.Rebikov Piano works
- Vladimir Rebikov Piano works
- Gala-Concert February 3, 1997 (Live Recording)
- Musique de Salon
- Paul Hindemith "Three Piano Sonatas"
- Anton Arensky's Twenty Four Pieces. Live
- Anton Arensky's Twenty Four Pieces
- Stravinsky's Piano Works
- Music of Russian Composers
- Music of Stravinsky and Bartok
- American Music for Tuba
- Sonatas of Dmitry Shostakovich
- Compositions of Tyzen Hsiao
- Music of Dmitry Kabalevsky. Vol.10
- Vyacheslav Artyomov's Ave
- Mieczslaw Vainberg's Children Notebooks
- Tso Chenguan's Chamber Works
- Prokofiev, Schnittke, Khachaturian, Eshpai
- Piotr Biely's Romances, Elegies
