= Svetlanov =

Svetlanov (Russian: Светланов) is a Russian male surname, its feminine counterpart is Svetlanova (Russian: Светланова). It may refer to:

- Yevgeny Svetlanov (1928–2002), Russian conductor and composer
  - 4135 Svetlanov, asteroid named after Yevgeny Svetlanov
  - Svetlanov Symphony Orchestra
- Nina Svetlanova (1932–2024), Russian-American pianist and educator
