= Clara Isabella Siegle =

German pianist

Clara Isabella Siegle (born 2000) is a German pianist and young Steinway Artist.

== Biography ==
Born in Erlangen on 21 January 2000, Clara Siegle has been studying piano since she was four under her Irish-born mother, Mary Siegle-Collins, who has also taught her twin sister Maria to play the violin and her brother Patrick to play the piano. In the autumn of 2014, she entered the Hochschule für Musik und Theater München in Munich where she is studying under Antti Siirala. She has also attended master classes under Elza Kolodin, Gabriele Kupfernagel and Finghin Collins.

In May 2017, Siegle took part in a master class with Rudolf Buchbinder, the artist in residence with the Symphonieorchester des Bayerischen Rundfunks. In 2020, Murray Perahia selected her and nine other young professional pianists to participate in his Beethoven Piano Sonatas masterclasses in Munich.

== Awards ==
Siegle has already received many awards including:

- 2007: Nurnberg Piano Competition, 2nd prize
- 2009: Virtuosi per Musica di Pianoforte Ústí nad Labem, 2nd prize
- 2011: Nurnberg Piano Competition, 1st prize
- 2012: 13th Ettlingen International Competition for Young Pianists, 5th prize (highest placed European participant)
- 2012: Rotary Piano Competition, Essen, 1st prize
- 2013: 77th Steinway Piano Competition, Hamburg, 1st prize
- 2013: Grotrian-Steinweg special prize, 59th International Grotrian-Steinweg Piano Competition, 1st prize
- 2014: International Piano Competition for Young Musicians, Enschede, Netherlands, 3rd prize
- 2015: Nurnberg Piano Competition, 2nd prize
- 2016: 24th Kleiner Schumann Competition, 2nd prize
- 2016: 10th Young Pianist of the North international competition, 1st prize
- 2017: Robert Schumann Competition for Young Pianists, Düsseldorf: 3rd prize
- 2017: International MozARTe Klavierwettbewerb 2017: 3rd prize.
