= Graham Fitch =

English pianist and piano teacher

Graham Fitch is an English pianist and piano teacher.

== Biography ==
Fitch was the first prize winner in the Mieczyslaw Munz Piano Competition, and graduated with honours from London's Royal College of Music as a Hopkinson Gold Medalist. He came to the United States on a Fulbright Scholarship and completed his studies with Nina Svetlanova. A 1985 review in The New York Times described his playing as "unalloyed pleasure".

During the 1990s, Fitch performed in England, where he taught piano at the Purcell School. He was a solo recitalist at the Bournemouth Festival, and appeared in repeat engagements with the London Chamber Soloists on London's South Bank. In America he played solo and in concerts with the Trio dell'Arte. Fitch was an associate professor at the University of Cape Town until 2008. He gave recitals, masterclasses and keynote addresses at the Australasian Piano Pedagogy Conference and London's Royal Academy of Music and participated in the Stellenbosch International Piano Symposium in 2008.

== SABC defamation and settlement ==
In June and July 2008, the television show SABC Special Assignment aired two programs which made unsubstantiated allegations that Fitch had had sex with under-age boys and had told colleagues that he was a crack addict. In response to the broadcast, Fitch filed a complaint with the Broadcasting Complaints Commission of South Africa (BCCSA) alleging defamation. In April 2009, the BCCSA agreed with Fitch, finding that the programmes were defamatory and that SABC had been negligent in broadcasting them, concluding that it was an "unfair trial by the media" and that Fitch had been "degraded to the status of the hunted." The commission ruled that "the truth of the allegations was not sufficiently substantiated and that, as such, the allegations and claims would not be acceptable in a court of law." SABC was fined 30,000 Rand for the first episode and 50,000 Rand for the second episode. At the time, this was the largest fine ever levied by the commission.
