= Carles & Sofia Piano Duo =

Spanish pianist duo

Carles Lama and Sofia Cabruja
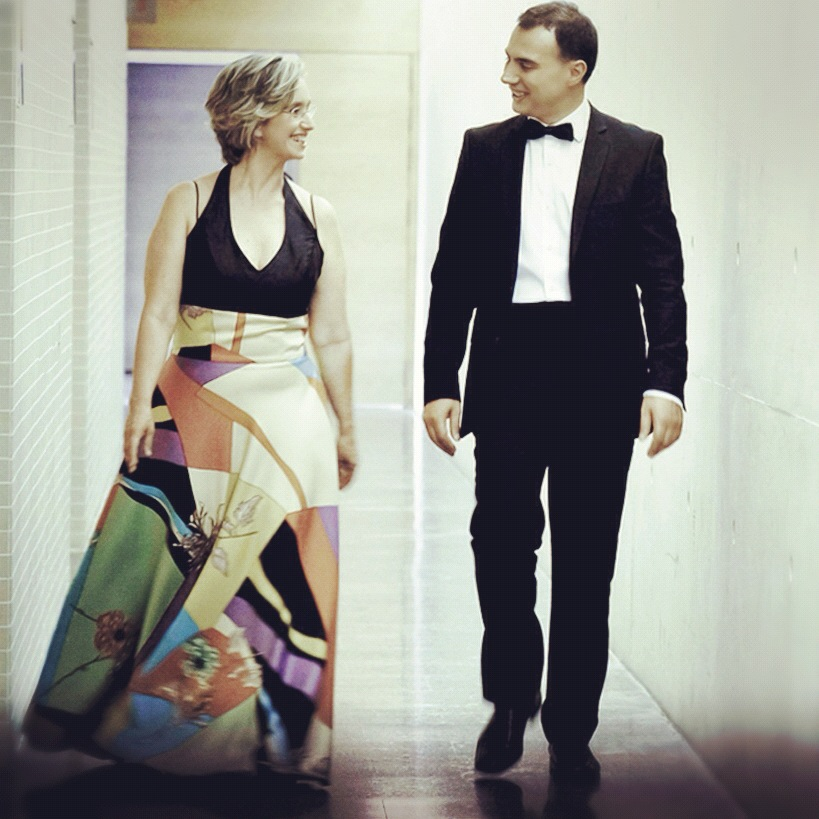
- Carles & Sofia Piano Duo

Background information
- Origin: Girona, Catalonia, Spain
- Genre: Classical music
- Occupations: Pianists; recording artists; professors; promoters; producers; mentors; entrepreneurs
- Instruments: Piano four hands
- Years active: 1987–present
- Label: KNS Classical
- Website: www.carlesandsofia.com
- Awards: =: Steinway Artists; UNICEF Distinction

Carles & Sofia Piano Duo is the name of the duo of pianists consisting of Carles (Carlos) Lama, born 26 February 1970 in Girona, Catalonia, Spain, and Sofia Cabruja, born 11 May 1965 also in Girona.

Carles and Sofia began playing together in 1987 and since then they have performed four-hands piano recitals, two pianos and orchestra concertos in Europe, America and Asia.

== Early life ==
Carles Lama and Sofia Cabruja began their studies in their home town, Girona, and obtained their Superior Degree in Barcelona, at the Conservatori Superior de Música del Liceu. In 1992, they were awarded a scholarship to pursue studies abroad and they enrolled at the École Normale de Musique de Paris, first, and later at The Hartt School (University of Hartford, Connecticut).

While at university in the US, they both were awarded scholarships. The two professors who, according to them, have had the greatest influence on the duo are the Russian pianist Nina Svetlanova and the Brazilian pianist Luiz de Moura Castro.

== Performing activity ==
Carles and Sofia's first public appearance as a duo was in 1987; since then, they have developed an international career performing recitals in many countries of Europe, America and Asia.

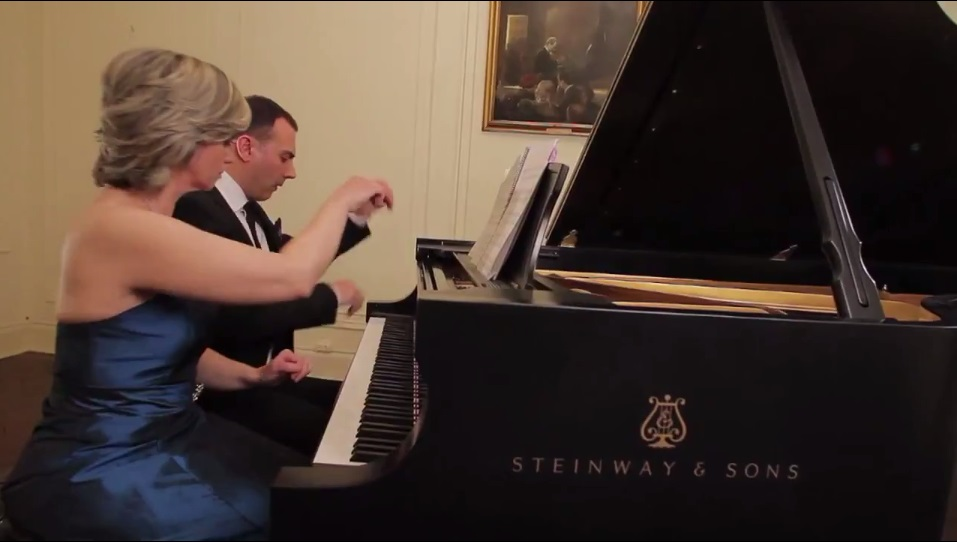
Carles and Sofia playing

Some of their appearances include: Carnegie Hall in New York City, in February 2011, where they performed a program including Maurice Ravel's La Valse; Jin Mao Tower in Shanghai, in March 2007, in a four-hands recital including Spanish works by Albéniz and de Falla, or Teatro Solís, Montevideo, Uruguay, where they were invited to present an Ibero-American program with works by Guastavino, Aceves and Basomba.

Carles and Sofia have performed concertos for two pianos and orchestra or one piano-four hands and orchestra with several worldwide orchestras:

In 2004, they performed the concerto for two pianos BWV 1060 by Johann Sebastian Bach with the National Symphony Orchestra of Malaysia, at the Yayasan Seni Berdaftar, in Kuala Lumpur.

In 2007, they premiered Thomas McIntosh's Concerto for piano four hands with the London City Chamber Orchestra, and in September 2011, they performed Poulenc's Concerto for Two Pianos and Orchestra in D minor with the State Hermitage Orchestra, at the Tzar's Village Music Festival.

Carles and Sofia have taken part in special events and projects: In 2012, they were invited to participate in the Bach Marathon, held at the International House of Music, in Moscow, where they played Bach's concerto for 3 pianos and orchestra in D major, BWV 1063, and the concerto for 4 pianos and orchestra in A minor, BWV 1065.

In 2013, they were asked to participate in a series of concerts of Beethoven's symphonies in chamber arrangements at the Fundación Juan March in Madrid, performing the 3rd and the 4th symphonies, arranged for piano four hands.

== Repertoire ==
Carles and Sofia's repertoire ranges from Bach to 21st century, including all major works for piano four hands and orchestral transcriptions, with a special taste for the repertoire of the French, Russian and German composers. In most of their concerts they perform Spanish music including works by Albéniz and de Falla. Carles and Sofia have developed a close relationship with many contemporary composers, like John Carmichael and Daniel Basomba, who after listening to the duo, created and dedicated works especially for them.

=== World premieres ===
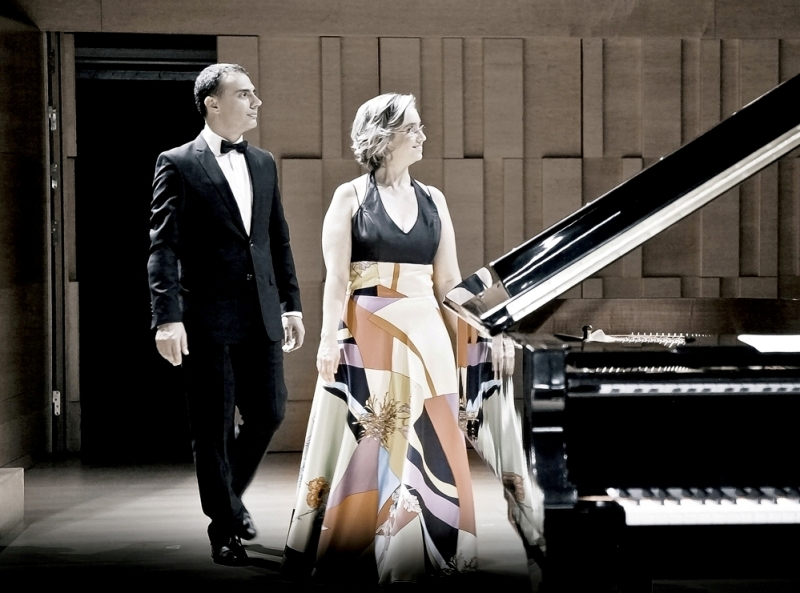
Carles & Sofia on stage

John Carmichael (Australia)

- Latin American Suite: Premiered in London, in 2001.
- Bravura Waltzes: Premiered in Barcelona, in 2005.
- Hommages: Premiered in Moscow, in 2013.

Thomas McIntosh (US)

- Concerto for piano four hands and orchestra. Premiered in London, with London City Chamber Orchestra, in 2008.

Daniel Basomba

- Three Studies for piano four hands: Premiered in Girona, Spain, in 2002. Dedicated to Carles and Sofia: Ed. Boileau
- Los Secretos del Búho (The Secrets of the Owl): Premiered in Portugal, in 2007
- Don Quixotte (Symphonic poem for piano four hands): Premiered in Malaysia in 2005, in commemoration of 400th anniversary of the publishing of Cervantes' Don Quixote. Dedicated to Carles and Sofia: Ed. Boileau.
- TNT (Toccata-Nocturno-Toccata): Premiered in Girona, Spain, in 2010.

Françoise Choveaux

- Concerto Catalan for piano four hands and orchestra. Premiered in Sant Pere de Rodes, Girona in 2009.

== Discography and recordings ==
Carles and Sofia are recording artists of KNS-Classical.

=== Recording list (CDs) ===
- Schubert, Schumann (1995): Sofia Cabruja's solo piano CD. Including Schubert's Impromptus Op. 90 and Schumann's Waldszenen Op. 82. Anacrusa Music. Re-released by KNS-classical.
- Brahms, Schubert, Debussy (1996): Including Brahms’Waltzes Op. 39, Schubert's Polonaises Op. 75 and Debussy's Petite Suite. Ars Harmonica. Re-released by KNS-classical.
- Chopin (1997): Carles Lama's solo piano CD. Including a Chopin recital, with Polonaises, Waltzes, Nocturnes and Balades. Ars Harmonica. Re-released by KNS-classical.
- Schubert, Brahms, Dvorák (2001): Including Schubert's Fantasy in F Minor, Brahms’ Variations on Schumann's theme and Three Slavic Dances by A. Dvorák. Released by KNS-classical.
- Fauré, Rachmaninoff, Montsalvatge, Basomba (2003) including Fauré's Dolly, Rachmaninoff's Suite Op. 11, Montsalvatge "Three Divertimentos" and Basomba's Three Studies for piano four hands, dedicated to Carles and Sofia. Released by KNS-classical.
- Fantasias for four hand of John Carmichael (2005): integral of works for four hands by the Australian composer, most of them dedicated and written for Carles and Sofia. Released by KNS-classical.
- El piano solista (2009): Recorded live in the Centro Cultural de España, in Montevideo, Uruguay: Including Aceves’ ”Impresiones de España Op. 116” in a historical Steinway & Sons piano. Released by the Centro Cultural de España.
- Golden Recordings (2012): In commemoration of the 25th anniversary of the duo. Released by KNS-classical.
- Spanish Essence (2014): Including 4 pieces from Albéniz' Suite Española and Two Dances from Manuel de Falla's La vida breve and other works by Moszkowski and Lecuona. KNS-classical.
- Goyescas in New York (2016)
- Brahms Lieder (2018)
- Schubert Fantasy (2019)
- Catalan Heart (2019)
- Encores (2020)

Carles & Sofia Piano Duo have had other recording experiences with ABC Classic FM, Catalunya Música, Radio France or Radio Prague, where they broadcast their music and CDs and interviewed them.

== Master classes and lectures ==
Carles and Sofia combine performance and teaching. They give master classes and lectures in different European, American and Asian countries.

Select master classes and lectures include:

In 2001, in Tokyo, at the Steinway Hall, they gave a lecture on Spanish music. In 2005, in Kuala Lumpur, they presented a workshop on Music & Literature, related to the acts of commemoration of the 400 anniversary of the publishing of Cervantes' Don Quixote.

In 2009, in Singapore, master class at Yong Siew Toh Conservatory of Music and at NAFA (Nanyang Academy of Fine Arts), in October.

In April 2013, master class at the University of Texas at Arlington. In June 2013, in Italy, Carles gave a master class on the topic "The technique at the service of the art".

== Artistic directors ==
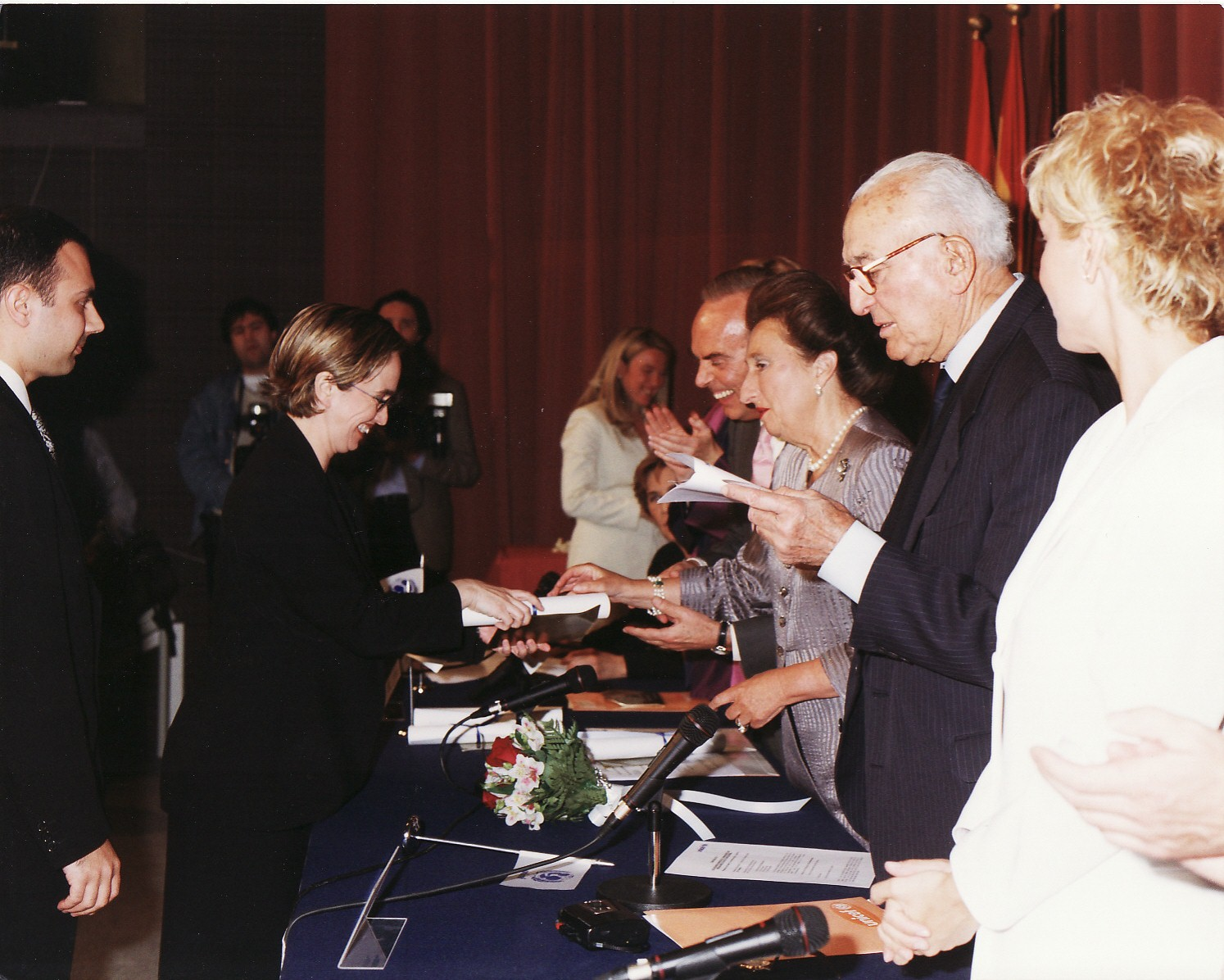
Carles and Sofia receiving a UNICEF award from Margarita de Borbón

Carles and Sofia have founded and act as artistic directors in several festivals and series of concerts.

- Festival de Música de Sant Pere de Rodes, taking place in Sant Pere de Rodes (El Port de la Selva) from 2001 to the present.
- Festival de Música de Besalú: taking place in the monastery of Sant Pere, in Besalú, from 2002 to 2012.
- Hammerklavier Series: a cycle of piano recitals in Barcelona (from 2004 to 2009) and in Girona (from 2003 to 2010).
- Liederkreis Series: a cycle of lied recitals in Girona, with translation of all poems to Catalan (from 2003 to 2010).

== Awards and distinctions ==
In 2001, in Madrid, after a series of benefit concerts, her Royal Highness Margarita de Borbón, presented to Carles and Sofia an honorary distinction from UNICEF, in recognition of their humanitarian efforts.

In 2012, coinciding with their 25th anniversary, they were recognized as Steinway Artists. This distinction was earlier granted to pianists and legends such as Arthur Rubinstein, Sergei Rachmaninoff or Alicia de Larrocha.

== Philanthropy and mentoring ==
In 2010, Carles and Sofia founded Concerts4Good: Music on a Mission, a project seeking to promote solidarity among mankind, through the emotional power of music. Concerts4Good is an international series of solidarity concerts which take place in different cities and countries. The first series of Concerts4Good took place in January 2013 in Porto, Portugal. Carles and Sofia also mentor some of the young, talented musicians and guide them along the path of music.
