= Anne Lovett (musician) =

French pianist & composer

- Genres: Contemporary classical, ambient, soundtrack
- Occupations: Pianist, composer
- Instrument: Piano
- Labels: Discovery, Champs Hill Records, 1631 Recordings
- Website: annelovett.net

Anne Lovett is a French pianist and composer residing in London.

She studied at the Royal Academy of Music and King's College London. She released her first album, Beyond (and Below), in 2012 under the record label Discovery Records, which received critical acclaim in Gramophone Awards and is now being distributed worldwide. The record comprises the artist's own piano works, an unusual artistic gesture in the contemporary classical world where most virtuoso performers tend to perform other composers' music. She released an album with violinist Giovanni Guzzo in 2013 on the label Champs Hill Records.

In October 2018, The Eleventh Hour was released on the label 1631 Recordings and published by Faber in London. She was joined on the album by the London Contemporary Orchestra as well as Oliver Coates on cello. The Guardian described the album as "a soulful elegy for a Britain which has lost its bearings." "Nocturne with Oliver Coates" was featured in a Burberry campaign and For Now on The Fix for ABC Studios in the U.S.

In 2020, Lovett was commissioned to write Infinity, a new work for British vocal ensemble Voces8. It was released on Decca Classics in August 2021.

== Discography ==
- Beyond (and Below) (2012)
- French Violin Sonatas (2014)
- The Eleventh Hour (2018)
- Sur Un Fil (2020)
- Infinity (2021)
