= Giacomo Scinardo =

- Born: December 27, 1983 (age 42); Paternò, Sicily, Italy
- Genres: Classical
- Occupation: Pianist
- Instrument: Piano
- Website: www.giacomoscinardo.com

Giacomo Scinardo (born 27 December 1983) is an Italian classical pianist.

Giacomo Scinardo was born in Paternò, Italy, and lives in Catania. He studied under Epifanio Comis, Bernard Ringeissen, Philippe Entremont and Leslie Howard.

Scinardo has appeared as soloist in Europe, Asia, Russia, and the United States.

He has performed with numerous world class orchestras including the Kiev Symphony Orchestra the George Enescu Symphony Orchestra.

Scinardo has performed numerous solo recitals in many concert halls including the Salle Cortot in Paris, the Tchaikovsky Conservatory in Moscow, the Ateneul Roman in Bucharest, the Detroit Institute of Arts, the Siam Ratchada Auditorium of Bangkok.

He participated in the Samuel Barber International Festival of West Chester in Philadelphia, Bangkok International Piano Festival

Scinardo has given several piano masterclasses in prestigious universities including the Gnessin State Musical College in Moscow, the University of Bangkok, University of Michigan School of Music, Theatre & Dance

== Recordings ==
- Evolution piano solo APS Label (2013)
- Modest Mussorgsky: Complete Piano Works Dynamic Label (2017)
