= Bernhard Ruchti =

Swiss pianist, composer and organist

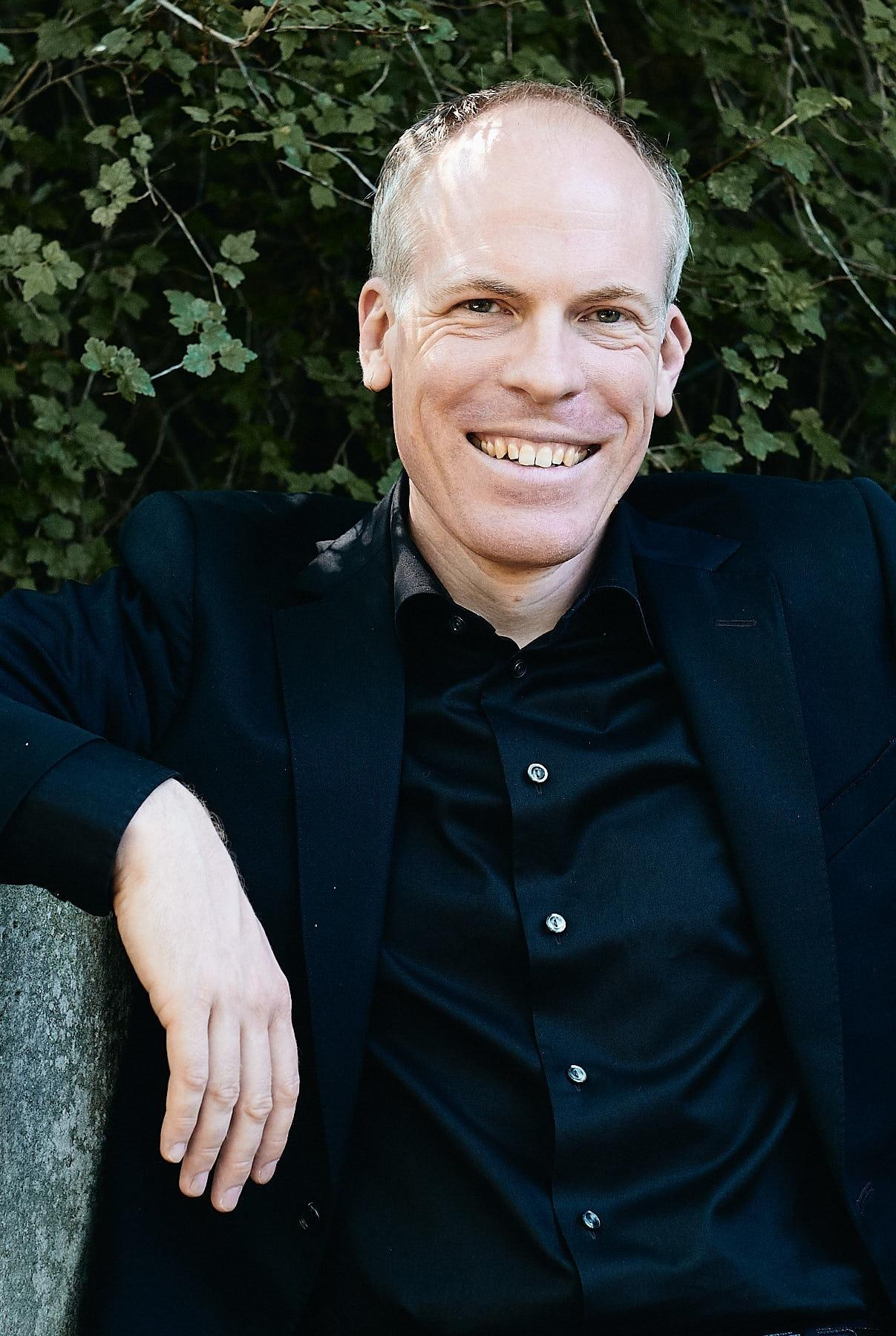
- Bernhard Ruchti in 2020.

Background information
- Born: 1 July 1974 (age 52); Berkeley, California, US
- Genres: Classical music
- Occupations: Musician; Composer; Music researcher
- Instruments: Piano; Organ
- Website: www.bernhardruchti.com

Bernhard Ruchti (born in 1974 in Berkeley, California, US) is a Swiss pianist, organist, composer and music researcher.

== Life ==
Ruchti studied piano with Eckart Heiligers and organ with Rudolf Scheidegger, Stefan Johannes Bleicher, and Bernhard Haas. Since 2013, he has been organist at the ev.-ref. Stadtkirche St. Laurenzen in St. Gallen.

During his time as a student he became interested in the performance practice and playing technique of the 19th century. Inspired by his studies with Bernhard Haas, he published an essay "Thoughts on the stimulation of organ playing by a pianistic playing technique" in 2006.

In 2010 and 2011, Ruchti spent a sabbatical in the United States and lived in San Francisco for 10 months. He began composing music and wrote a number of piano pieces, including "Five Songs of The Wind." These were released on his album "Liszt & The Black Hills" in 2012. He released another album of his own works ("Echoes from Chrysospilia") in 2017.

In 2017 he was awarded by the city of St. Gallen with the Förderpreis Kultur.

In 2018, the world premiere of his choral cantata "Auf die Tiefe: ein irdisch Fahrtenlied" on a text by Bernd Gonner took place. The same year, he began his "A Tempo Project".

== The "A Tempo Project" ==
Since 2018, Ruchti has been conducting his "A Tempo Project," an interpretation, research, and recording project that explores tempo and time in 19th-century music. The focus is on Franz Liszt's performance practice.

His work started with the exploration of the academically controversial "double beat theory" by Willem Retze Talsma, which postulates an alternative use of the metronome and subsequently a much slower interpretation of classical music. Ruchti sees a historical justification for the idea of “double-beat” but takes a critical distance to the double-beat-theory itself. He uses it for the reinterpretation of classical works such as Frédéric Chopin's Études or Robert Schumann’s Fantasy in C-major.

In 2021, Ruchti published a book on the performance practice of Franz Liszt's Fantasy and Fugue on Ad nos, ad salutarem undam for organ. The book presents the history surrounding the composition, premiere, and reception of the work in the 19th century. It provides insight into Liszt's performance practices, specifically about tempo. The starting point is the duration of the work of 45 minutes documented at the time it was first performed. This duration differs from modern interpretations by more than 15 minutes. Ruchti also recorded the work on the Ladegast organ at Merseburg Cathedral, on which Liszt premiered the work.

Starting with Volume V of the A Tempo Project, Ruchti does not explore the “double-beat-theory” anymore but turns more to the musical aspects of tempo through historically documented duration, with works by Franz Liszt and Ludwig van Beethoven.

== The music at the City Church of St. Laurenzen and the development of the Surround Organ ==
Since 2014, Ruchti has been the head of the musical activities at St. Laurenzen church. He has been organizing the traditional “Laurenzen Concerts” as well as creating "Laurenzen Vespers". The “Laurenzen Vespers” consist of half an hour of music and poetry at monthly intervals.

Starting in 2016, Ruchti developed the idea of a surround organ for the Stadtkirche St. Laurenzen in St. Gallen. The existing organ in the church by Orgelbau Kuhn (III/Ped, 45 stops) is supplemented by three new pipe locations corresponding to the three main timbres of an organ (principals, flutes, strings). These new pipe divisions are located on the three galleries of the church, creating a surround effect. The new organ, inaugurated in September 2023, was built by Orgelbau Goll from Lucerne, Switzerland.

== Discography ==
- 2012: Liszt & The Black Hills
- 2017: Echoes from Chrysospilia
- 2019: Beethoven A Tempo I (Piano Sonatas Op. 2 No. 1 and Op. 110)
- 2019: Liszt A Tempo I (Fantasy and Fugue on Ad nos, ad salutarem undam)
- 2020: Schumann A Tempo (Fantasy in C major Op. 17)
- 2021: Chopin A Tempo (Études Op. 10)
- 2021: Liszt A Tempo II (Années de Pèlerinage, Italie)
- 2022: Beethoven A Tempo II ("Hammerklavier Sonata" Op. 106)
- 2023: Beethoven A Tempo III (Piano Sonatas Op. 13, 27 and 90)
- 2023: Liszt A Tempo III (Piano Sonata in B minor)
