= Thomas Lorango =

American musician

Thomas Lorango, American pianist, was born on June 8, 1959, in Buffalo, New York. He died of AIDS on December 30, 1992 in New York City.

== Life ==
Lorango studied piano at the Curtis Institute of Music, where his teachers included Leon Fleischer, Mieczyslaw Horszowski and Seymour Lipkin. He won prizes including the Leventritt Foundation Award, a Young Recitalist's Fellowship Grant from the National Endowment for the Arts, the first piano prize at the 1979 G.B. Dealy Awards Competition and the 1985 First Prize in the Liederkranz Foundation Competition.

Lorango made his debut at age 16 performing Sergei Rachmaninoff's Piano Concerto No. 1 with the Philadelphia Orchestra. He again performed with that orchestra two years later as soloist in the Piano Concerto No. 3 of Béla Bartók. He also performed with the Dallas Symphony, the St. Louis Symphony and the Buffalo Philharmonic and gave solo recitals at Alice Tully Hall, Coolidge Auditorium at the US Library of Congress, and other halls in the United States and Europe. A participant in the Marlboro Music Festival, Lorango toured with Music from Marlboro.

== Recordings ==
Lorango appeared on three compact disc recordings issued by the Newport Classic label:

NCD 60034, Robert Schumann: Piano Concerto in A Minor, performed on an 1871 Streicher piano with the New Brandenburg Collegium under Anthony Newman (also included nos. 1, 6, 7, 12, and 13 from Schumann's Kinderszenen, op. 15; Romance in F-Sharp Major, op. 28 no. 2; Warum, no. 3 from Phantasiestücke, Op. 12; and no. 1 from Gesänge der Frühe, Op. 133). According to the label, this recording was the first of the concerto with period instruments.

NCD 60108, Thomas Lorango: The Debut Album (Brahms, Sonata No. 3 in F minor, op. 5; Robert Schumann, Etudes Symphoniques, op. 13)

NCD 60133, Richard Wagner: Original Piano Works (Eine Sonata für das Album von Frau M.W., Grösse-Sonata in A Major, Fantasia in F-Sharp Minor, Albumblatt für Frau Betty Schott)

== Sources ==
Who's Who in American Music : Classical, first edition, edited by Jaques Cattell Press, New York: R. R. Bowker, 1983 (as referenced in the Musicsack

The New York Times, obituary, "Thomas Lorango, 33, A Piano Soloist at 16", January 6, 1993.

Biographical material included in notes booklet for Newport Classic NCD 60133.
