= Fenia Chang =

Taiwanese pianist

Dr. Fenia Chang is a Taiwanese pianist.

== Early life and education ==
Fenia Chang is a native of Taiwan. She began piano study at the age of 9^{[source?]} and made her solo debut at the age of 11, after winning the first Japan Kawai Piano Competition. Her first national recital at age 11 was broadcast on television in Taiwan.^{[source?]}

Chang studied at the Juilliard School and earned her bachelors and masters degrees there. She earned her doctorate as a professor of Piano from the University of Maryland.

== Career ==
Chang has been certified as a piano teacher by the Music Teachers National Association since 2005. She has served on the piano faculty at Austin College and Dallas College Mountain View, and held a position as assistant professor of music at Texas A&M University at Commerce. She has taught at Collin College and Southern Methodist University. She has been on the faculty of several schools of music.^{[source?]} Her teaching is further supported by the success of her students in both national and international competitions.^{[subjective wording + need substantial evidence]}

In recent years, Chang has played on stage with orchestras such as the Sherman Symphony Orchestra, Allen Philharmonic Orchestra, New Texas Sinfonia, and the Dallas Chamber Symphony. Chang has played at various venues in North America, Europe and Asia as a soloist, chamber musician and concerto soloist.^{[this source mentions that she has played on 3 continents; they do not necessarily mean North America, Europe and Asia. source?]} She performed at Dame Myra Hess concerts given weekly in Chicago, concerts inspired by those given by Dame Myra Hess in London during World War II.^{[source?]}

Chang has roles as a collaborative pianist, chamber musician, adjudicator, clinician and presenter at music workshops in the Dallas Fort Worth area. She has adjudicated at several piano competitions, such as the TMTA Regional Solo Performance Contest in 2022.

Chang maintains her own website,^{[source? I didn't see any note of this on her official website]} and appears in concerts regularly.^{[ need substantial evidence]}

== Influences ==
Chang has cited Abbey Simon, Jerome Lowenthal, Russell Sherman John Perry, Thomas Schumacher, and Santiago Rodriguez as mentors.
