= Jovianney Emmanuel Cruz =

- Origin: Philippines
- Genres: Classical
- Occupations: Pianist, pedagogue, artistic director
- Instrument: Piano
- Website: jovianney.com

Jovianney Emmanuel Cruz is an acclaimed and multi-awarded Filipino concert pianist.

== Awards ==
- The City of Manila Award for Arts & Culture, 2008
- The Filipino World Class Achiever, 1999
- The Outstanding Young Men (TOYM), 1996
- The Harold Bauer Award, 1989
- The Stanley Thomas Johnson Foundation Scholarships, 1987 – 1991
- Full Merit Scholarships, Manhattan School of Music, 1984 – 1991
- Young Artists Foundation of the Philippines Scholar, 1980 – 1989
- The Elva Van Gelder Memorial Scholarship, 1980 – 1984
- The Anne-McDermott Memorial Scholarship for Chamber Music, 1984
- Second Prize, International Competition for Piano and Orchestra in Sicily, 1994
- Prizewinner, International Piano Competition of Jaen, 1993
- Third Prize, Pilar Bayona International Piano Competition, 1992
- Prizewinner, Rina Sala Gallo International Piano Competition, 1990
- Third Prize & the Rolex Award, Maria Canals International Piano Competition, 1990
- Third Prize, Jose Iturbi International Piano Competition, 1988
- First Prize, The Haddonfield Symphony Piano Soloists Competition, 1988
- First Prize, The Bergen Philharmonic Piano Soloists Competition, 1988
- Third Prize, Frinna Awerbuch International Piano Competition, 1985
- First Prize, The Great Neck Symphony Piano Competition, 1985
- First Prize, The Port Washington Piano Competition, 1985
- First Prize, Five Towns Music, and Art Solo Competition, 1985
- Laureate, The Manhattan School of Music College Division Concerto Competition, 1985
- First Prize, New York State Music Teachers Association State Collegiate Artist Competition, 1984
- Gold Medal, The Queens Symphony Soloists Competition, 1984
- Laureate, The Manhattan School of Music Preparatory Division Concerto Competition, 1983
- Top Prizes, National Music Competitions for Young Artists (Philippines), 1974-1976
