= Saeyoon Chon =

South Korean pianist and educator (born 1995)

- Born: 1995 (age 30–31); South Korea
- Occupations: Pianist, educator
- Instrument: Piano
- Years active: 2010–present
- Website: saeyoonchon.com

Saeyoon Chon (born 1995) is a South Korean classical pianist and educator. In 2018, he won first prize at the Dublin International Piano Competition, becoming the competition’s first Asian winner.

== Early life and education ==
Chon was born in South Korea in 1995. He studied at the Glenn Gould School of the Royal Conservatory of Music in Toronto, where he earned a Bachelor of Music and an Artist Diploma. He later completed a Master of Music degree at the Juilliard School in New York, and is pursuing a Doctor of Musical Arts at New York University, where he also teaches as adjunct faculty in Piano Studies.

== Career ==
=== Competitions ===
In 2018 Chon won the Dublin International Piano Competition, widely covered in Irish and Korean press.

He has also received prizes at a number of international competitions, including:

- the Maria Canals International Music Competition (Barcelona),
- the Hilton Head International Piano Competition (USA),
- the Valencia International Piano Competition Prize Iturbi (Spain),
- the Seoul International Music Competition (South Korea),
- the Vendome Prize (Switzerland/France),
- and the Cooper International Competition (USA).

=== Performances ===
Chon has performed in recital at venues including Carnegie Hall (Weill Recital Hall). His New York debut was described by ConcertoNet as “a masterful interpretation, and the crowning achievement of a very successful debut.”

At the 2019 New Ross Piano Festival, The Irish Times characterized his performance as “totally secure and clear-speaking.” Ahead of a Dublin recital, The Journal of Music praised his “flawless technique and hugely sensitive musicianship.”

Chon was also featured on RTÉ Radio 1’s Arena program, discussing his Dublin competition win and subsequent recital appearances.

=== Festivals ===
Chon has appeared at major international festivals. At the Verbier Festival, he received the 2021 Tabor Foundation Award, presented to the best pianist of the soloist programmes. He has also participated in the Ravinia Festival’s Steans Music Institute in 2024 and 2025, with appearances noted in Chicago press.

=== Teaching ===
Since 2024 Chon has served as Adjunct Faculty of Piano Studies at New York University’s Steinhardt School of Culture, Education, and Human Development.
