= Antonio Iturrioz =

Cuban-born American classical pianist

Antonio Iturrioz is a Cuban born American classical pianist. He is a noted performer, documentarian and a piano teacher.

== Early life ==
Antonio was born in Cuba in the town of Havana. His teachers include his father Pablo Iturrioz, Francisco de Hoyos, Bernardo Segall (who was a pupil of Siloti), Aube Tzerko and Julian White. He has taken many master classes with Andre Watts, Alexis Weissenberg, Byron Janis and Jorge Bolet.

== Musical style and discography ==
Antonio gave his first performance at age 9 and made his orchestral debut at age 15. After an injury to his right hand in his early years, he took 3 years to recover when he studied the complete left hand transcriptions and original compositions of Leopold Godowsky. Antonio's first documentary “The Art of the Left Hand: A Brief History of Left Hand Piano Music”, was the result of his many years of studying the left hand piano repertoire and Godowsky was the central figure. In 2010 Antonio created a documentary called "The Buddha of the Piano - Leopold Godowsky" based on his research into the composers life and music. The documentary has been shown on public television across the United States. Antonio is a Steinway Artist Antonio is the Director of the New International Godowsky Society. In September 2018, Antonio released a new album on the Steinway Label named Gottschalk and Cuba, which contains the first ever recording of A Night in the Tropics, Symphony Romantique, with both movements on piano.

== Personal life ==
Antonio is married and lives with his wife in the Russian River Area of Sonoma, California.
