= Adlan Cruz =

Puerto Rican musician

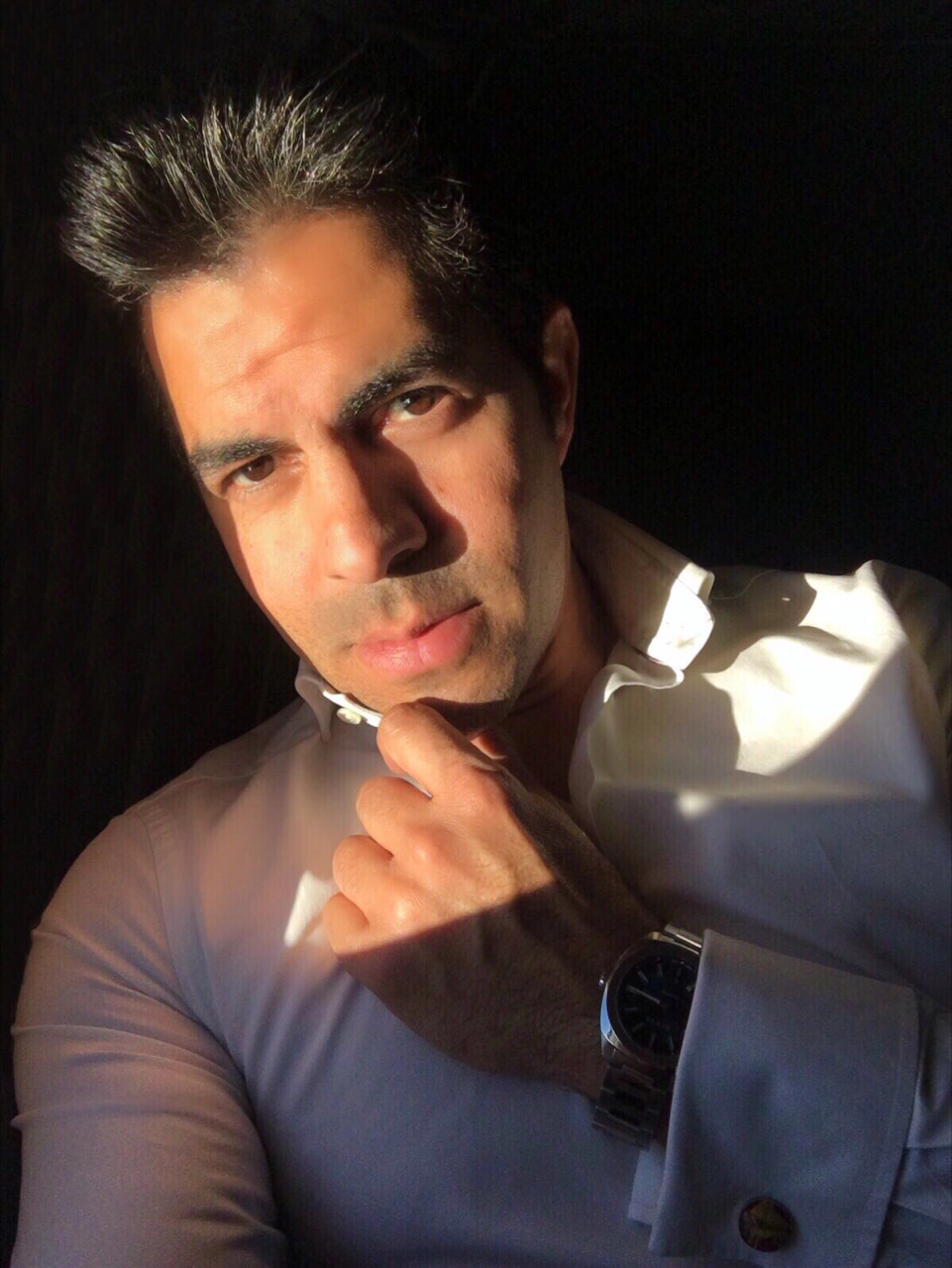

Background information
- Born: November 28, 1968 (age 57); Bayamón, Puerto Rico
- Occupation: professional concert pianist
- Instrument: Piano
- Years active: 1989–present
- Website: http://www.adlancruz.com

Adlan Cruz (born November 28, 1968) is a Puerto Rican pianist, composer and producer.

Cruz began playing the piano by ear at the age of three. He released his first album in 1989.

A graduate of the Hartt School in Connecticut, his studies were financed with a scholarship given to him by former Puerto Rico Governor, philanthropist and pianist Luis A. Ferré, whom he impressed early on with his talent.

He sponsors a private foundation to benefit the youth of Brazil.

As part of his worldwide concert schedule over the years, in December, 2000, Cruz performed live before 3.4 million people in Lagos, Nigeria.

In early 2009 he recorded his ninth CD in San Juan, Puerto Rico.

== Discography ==
- 1989 Instrument of Praise
- 1993 The Way for the Giver
- 1995 Adlan: Solus
- 2001 The Piano According to Adlan
- 2002 Latin Africa
- 2002 Duo Clásico
- 2003 Colors of Many Nations
- 2003 Interludes
- 2003 Return
- 2004 Shemoneh Esrei - Amidah
- 2005 The Pianoforte Collection Vol. I & II
- 2005 The PianoForte Tour: Live In Brazil DVD & CD
- 2006 Concierto del Centenario DVD & CD
- 2007 Piano Latino
- 2007 Christmas Around the World
- 2008 Monster Under my Bed: Short Film Music Score
- 2008 Friends in Worship
- 2009 Crooked : Short Film Music Score
- 2009 Inspiration: A Collection of Hymns
- 2010 All by Grace: Live in Virginia
- 2011 Friends in Worship Vol. II
- 2011 Live in Bolivia DVD & CD
