= Cheng Wai =

Pianist from Hong Kong

Cheng Wai 鄭慧
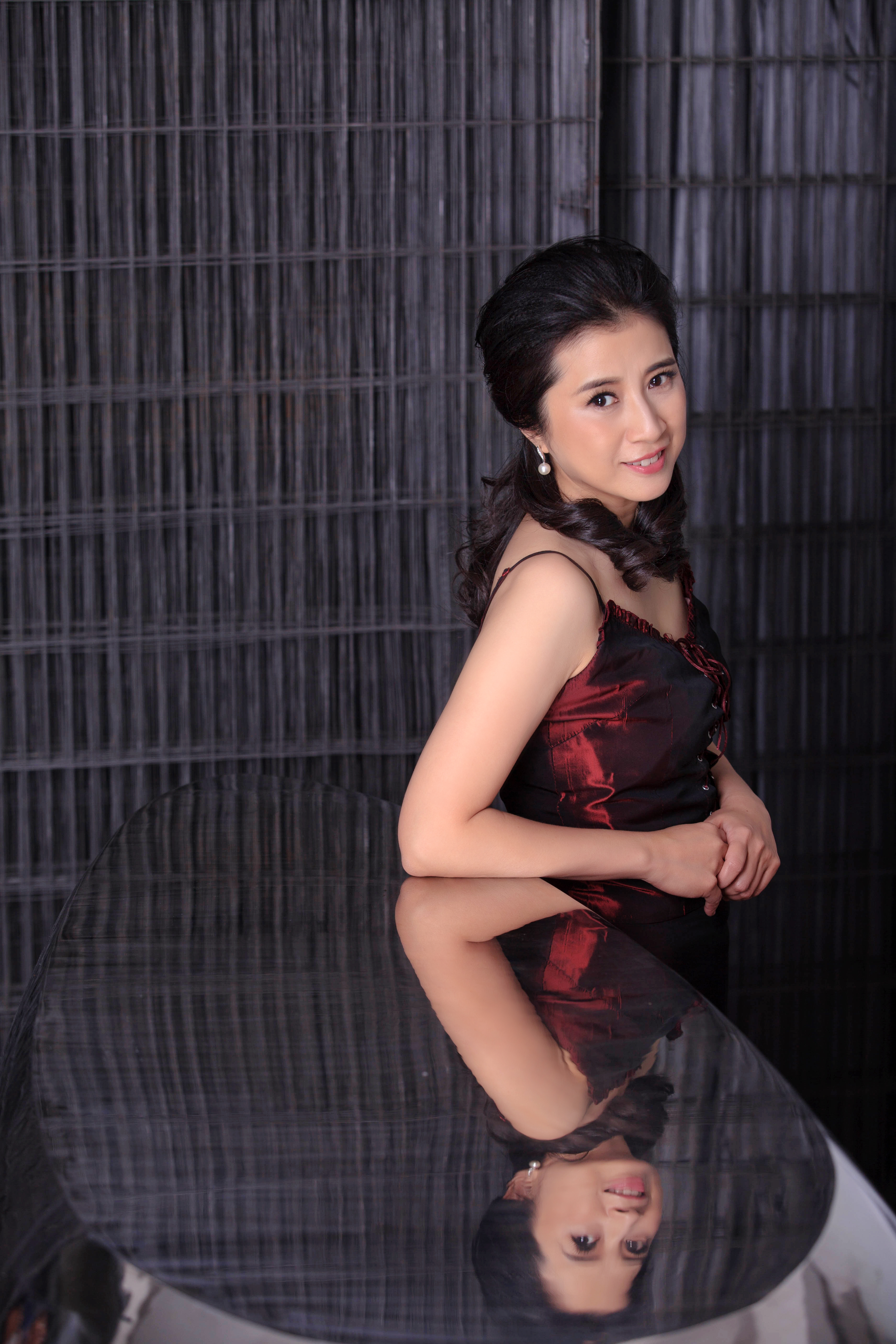

Background information
- Born: Beijing, China
- Origin: Hong Kong
- Genres: Classical
- Occupation: Pianist
- Instrument: Piano
- Label: Hong Kong Performance
- Website: www.waicheng.com

Cheng Wai
- Traditional Chinese: 鄭慧
- Simplified Chinese: 郑慧
Transcriptions
Standard Mandarin
- Hanyu Pinyin: Zhèng Huì
Yue: Cantonese
- Yale Romanization: Jehng Waih
- Jyutping: Zeng6 Wai6

Praised as the "Piano Poet", Cheng Wai (鄭慧) is a pianist and Steinway Artist from Hong Kong. She is a winner of the Hong Kong Young Music Performer Award of the International Year of Youth and voted as one of the Top Ten Outstanding Young Persons by the Junior Chamber International Hong Kong in 2009.

== Life and career ==
Graduating early from the Hong Kong Academy for Performing Arts, she obtained a bachelor's degree from the Curtis Institute of Music. She obtained her master's degree and artist diploma at Yale University and received her doctoral degree from New York State University at Stony Brook. Her principal teachers include Ling Yuan, Gabriel Kwok, John Winther, Seymour Lipkin, Claude Frank, Gilbert Kalish.

She is now the chairlady of the Central Conservatory of Music (HK) Foundation, and currently teaching at the Hong Kong Academy for Performing Arts, Hong Kong Baptist University and The Chinese University of Hong Kong, and has also adjudicated in numerous local and international competitions. She is the founder of the Cheng Wai Piano Institute and a founding member of the Metropolitan Trio and JW Piano Duo.

== Select appearances ==
In 2008, Cheng performed and recorded The Yellow River Piano Concerto with Sichuan Symphony Orchestra at the Cheng Du Jiao Zi Concert Hall.

Cheng performed and recorded Piano Concerto No. 1 (Tchaikovsky) with Hong Kong Philharmonic Orchestra at the Hong Kong Cultural Centre.

In 2015, Cheng Wai was invited to perform concerts in Schlern International Music Festival as a master pianist.

In Nov. 27, 2015, Cheng Wai and Jing Wang, Concertmaster of the Hong Kong Philharmonic Orchestra, performed in the James Christie room at the Convention Centre for Christie's selling exhibition The Art of Music.

In 2017, Cheng Wai launched her "Dessiner la MusiqueCheng Wai Piano Recital China Tour" (《詩琴畫意》2017中國巡演) with Beijing Poly Theatre Management Ltd..

== Awards ==
- 1997 First Prize, New York Stony Brook Concerto Competition
- 1995 Third Prize, William Byrd International Young Artist Competition
- 1995 Second Prize, Bergen Philharmonic Competition for Violin and Piano, New York
- 1994 First Prize, Hong Kong Young Pianist Competition, pre-competition for 1994 Beijing International Piano Competition.
- 1993 Third Prize, Kingsville International Young Performances Competition, TX
- 1992 Champion, Olga Koussevitzky Piano Competition, New York City, NY
- 1992 Champion, Yale Philharmonia Woolsey Hall Concerto Competition
- 1990 Champion, Gina Bachauer International (Asian Region) Piano Competition
- 1987 Third-Plaza, Hong Kong Pre-Bachauer Piano Competition
- 1986 Champion, Lady Malehose Music Competition
- 1985 Champion, Hong Kong Young Music Performer Award Competition
- 1984 Champion, The Pearl River Piano Competition of China
- 1984 Hong Kong Arts Festival Prize for Western Music Instrument

== Discography ==
DVD, Leung Kin-fung in Concert (August, 2007) Recording Artists: Leung Kin-fung, Violin & Cheng Wai, Piano

Recording Label: Music Chamber Ltd. (Hong Kong)

DVD, Cheng Wai in Concert (July, 2003) Recording Artists: Cheng Wai, Piano & Hong Kong Philharmonic Orchestra

Recording Label: Media Box Productions (Hong Kong)

DVD, Four Seasons (December, 2003) Recording Artist: Leung Kin-fung, Violin, Cheng Wai, Piano & Macau Youth Symphony Orchestra

Recording Label: Music Chamber Ltd. (Hong Kong)

DVD, Pure String Project (April, 2004) Recording Artists: Cheng Wai-Piano, Monica Su-Cello, Ray Wang-Cello & Michael Ma-Violin

Recording Label: Music Chamber Ltd. (Hong Kong)
