= Vladimir Natanson =

Russian pianist, music educator, and musicologist (1909–1993)

Vladimir Aleksandrovich Natanson (Russian: Владимир Александрович Натансон; 1 March [O.S. 16 February] 1909 – 8 September 1993) was a Soviet and Russian pianist, music educator, and musicologist. He is known for being a teacher of Đặng Thái Sơn and the author of various works on Russian music history and piano pedagogy.

== Biography ==
Vladimir Natanson was born on 1 March 1909 in Gulyaypole (now Huliaipole, Ukraine). He studied under Feodor Koenemann and Samuil Feinberg, graduating from the Moscow Conservatory in 1931. He completed postgraduate studies in 1935. From 1935, Natanson taught at the conservatory. He was wounded in 1941 from the Second World War and evacuated to Tashkent, where he continued to teach as well as working as a music editor for Tashkent Radio.

In 1958, Natanson was awarded the Candidate of Art History. From 1967 on, he was a professor at Moscow Conservatory. Natanson died on 8 September 1993 in Moscow.

== Works ==
Natanson wrote books on music history and also music reviews. He compiled and edited various collections of music for use in teaching. With Feinberg's brother, he also prepared the musician's works for publication.

== Selected works ==
- From the Musical Past of Moscow University (Из музыкального прошлого Московского университета; Moscow, 1955)
- The Past of Russian Pianism (Прошлое русского пианизма; Moscow, 1960)
- Russian Pianists of the 1840s and 1850s, in Issues of the Musical Performing Art, issue No. 3 (Русские пианисты 40-50-х годов XIX века; Moscow, 1962)
- Piano Works of Beethoven in the Russian Concert Repertoire, in Beethoven, issue No. 2 (Фортепианные произведения Бетховена в русском концертном репертуаре; Moscow, 1972)
