= Ingmar Piano Duo =

Ingmar Piano Duo is a pianistic duo (two pianos) founded by Serbian pianists and piano professors Slobodanka Stevic and Aleksandar Gligic in 2005. Duo's first musical cd edition was published by Austrian piano manufacturer Wendl & Lung in Vienna, presenting works by Piazzolla, Barber and Kovacevic. Ingmar Piano Duo was invited to and performed at World Piano Conference EPTA 2009, playing Symphonic Dances (two piano edition) by Sergei Rachmaninoff. As a result of this notable success, an invitation was forwarded to the Duo to compete at 19th International Piano Competition ROMA 2009 in Rome, Italy, where they were announced winners of the piano duo category, winning as well special award of Sergio Calligaris, for best performance of a work by this Italian contemporary composer. Ingmar Piano Duo has shown a tendency to give a world premiere performance of works by contemporary composers (Vrebalov, Mudi). Ingmar Piano Duo has recorded for Musical Archives of Radio-Television of Vojvodina pieces by Wolfgang Amadeus Mozart, Maurice Ravel, Aleksandra Vrebalov and Sergio Calligaris. In 2010, the Duo qualified for semi-final round at the World Piano Competition in San Marino, entering the circle of 12 best piano duos from over a hundred that applied for the competition.
