= Usman Anees =

Pakistani composer and pianist

- Born: Karachi, Pakistan

Usman Anees (Note: Urdu: عثمان انیس, pronounced [ʊsˈmaːn əˈniːs].) (born Karachi, Pakistan) is a Pakistani concert pianist, composer, and music educator. He is among the few Pakistani classical musicians to have established both a domestic and international performance career in Western art music.

== Early Life and Training ==
Anees began piano studies at the age of eight under his father, Ijaz Anees. He gave his debut public concert in Karachi at the age of eleven. He subsequently earned master's degrees in both piano performance and composition from Trinity College of Music, London.

== Performance career ==
In his early career, Anees performed extensively across Pakistan, appearing at embassies, consulates, and cultural centres throughout the country. At twenty, he made his international solo debut in Berlin with a recital at the Mendelssohn Gesellschaft, where his performance was received with considerable acclaim. He has since performed as a soloist, in collaboration with visiting artists, and as a recording musician in venues around the world.

== Compositions ==
As a composer, Anees has written works across multiple forms, including solo piano music, a Symphony, a Piano Concerto, and other orchestral compositions. His music was selected for performance by the orchestra of the Singaporean Music Festival. His compositions are published and available both in print and through online streaming platforms.
