= Katarzyna Jaczynowska =

Polish pianist and educator

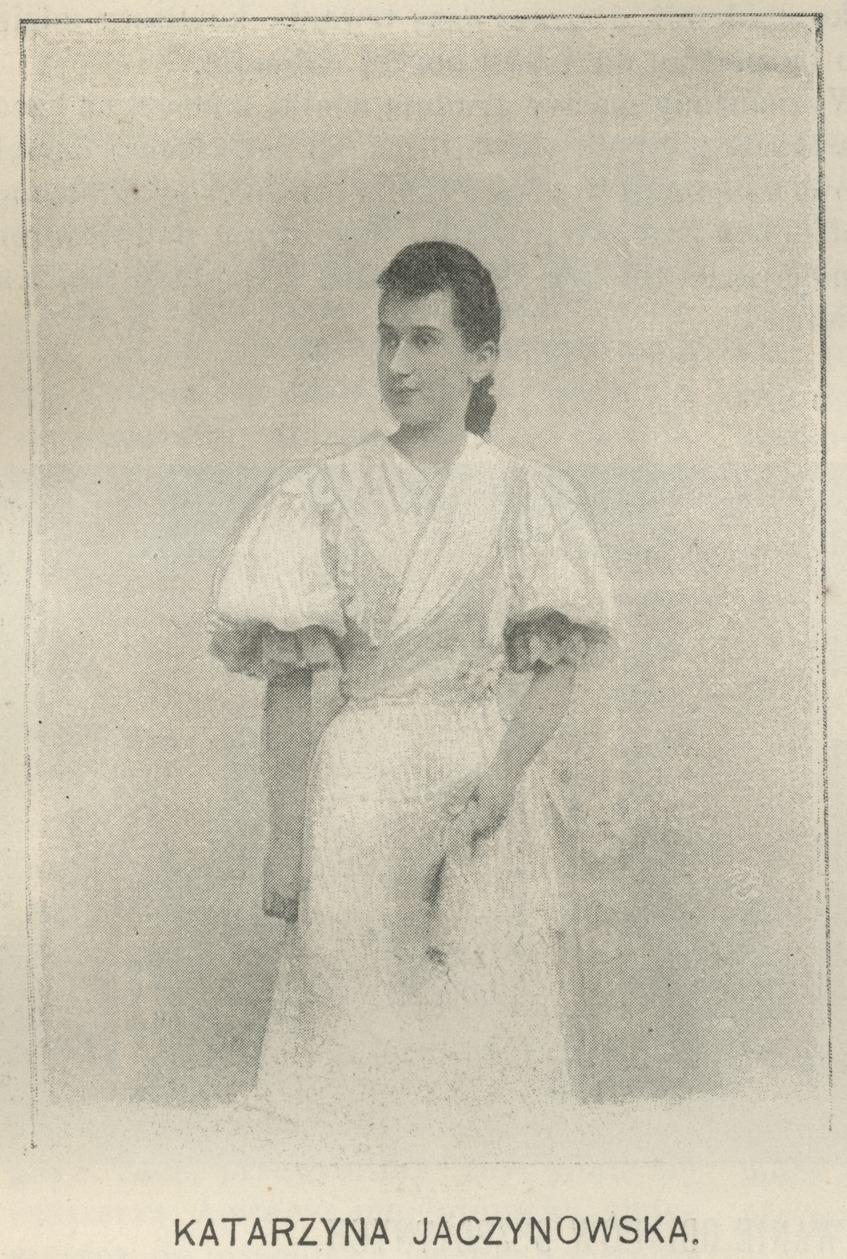

Katarzyna Jaczynowska (March 23, 1872 – September 3, 1920) was a Polish pianist and educator.

She was born in Szawle in Lithuania and studied at the Saint Petersburg Conservatory graduating in 1893. She continued her studies with Anton Rubinstein, who dedicated one of his nocturnes to her. Jaczynowska also studied with Theodor Leschetizky in Vienna. She taught at the Warsaw Conservatory.

She performed in a trio with violinist Leopold Auer and cellist Aleksandr Verzhbilovich, as well as performing in chamber groups and often appeared with violinist Stanisław Barcewicz. She gave concerts in Russia, Germany and Poland. Jaczynowska was praised for her interpretation of works by composers such as Chopin, Beethoven and Schumann. She was considered one of the best performers of Zygmunt Noskowski's Piano Quartet in D minor.

She died in Warsaw at the age of 48.
