= Frans van Ruth =

Dutch pianist and songwriter (born 1951)

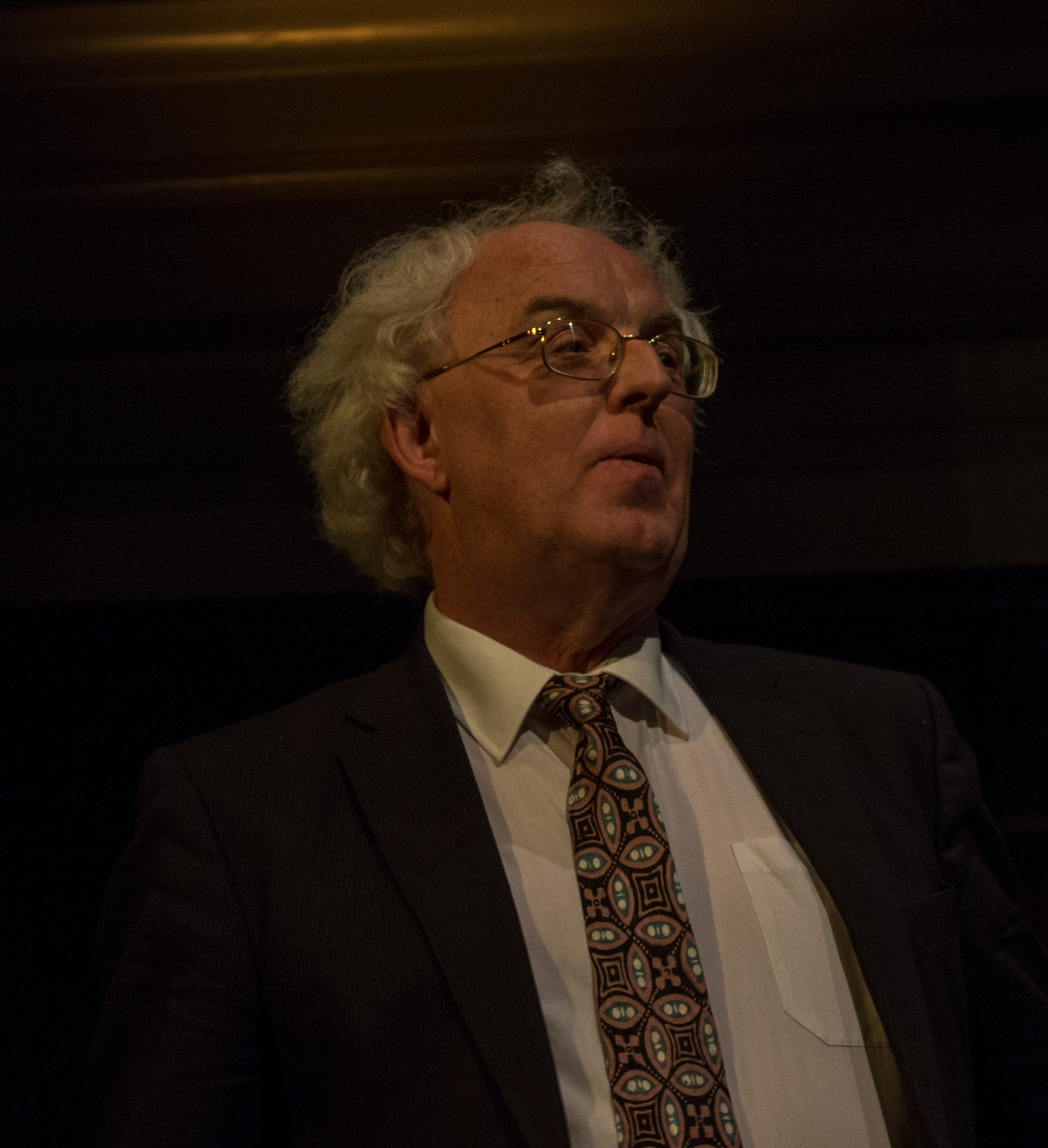
- van Ruth in 2015
- Born: 27 April 1951 (age 74); Netherlands
- Occupations: Pianist, Songwriter
- Website: www.fransvanruth.nl

Frans van Ruth (born 27 April 1951) is a Dutch Classical pianist and songwriter. Mostly known for his works Songs in Love and Death and Allegro.

== Life and career ==
=== Early life ===
Frans van Ruth studied at Utrecht Conservatory at world renowned music school in Utrecht, Netherlands. Van Ruth studied at multiple schools during his youth due to his family moving frequently. Due to this is what Van T Ruth credits with making him begin playing the piano.

=== Career ===
van Ruth began his career in 1970 at the age of 19. In his career particularly in his career beginnings he expressed an interest in Dutch music particularly classical music and piano. Van Ruth and a colleague Willem Noske studied heavily on the music in the Netherlands in the 19th century, resulting in numerous concerts and recordings. Nearly three quarters of Van Ruth's work and recordings were made and released in the first 15 years of his career. In 1995 he worked with flutist Eleonore Pameijerdean founder of the Leo Smit Foundation. Until 2004 he is a programmer and pianist of the Uilenburger Concerts organized by the foundation in Amsterdam.

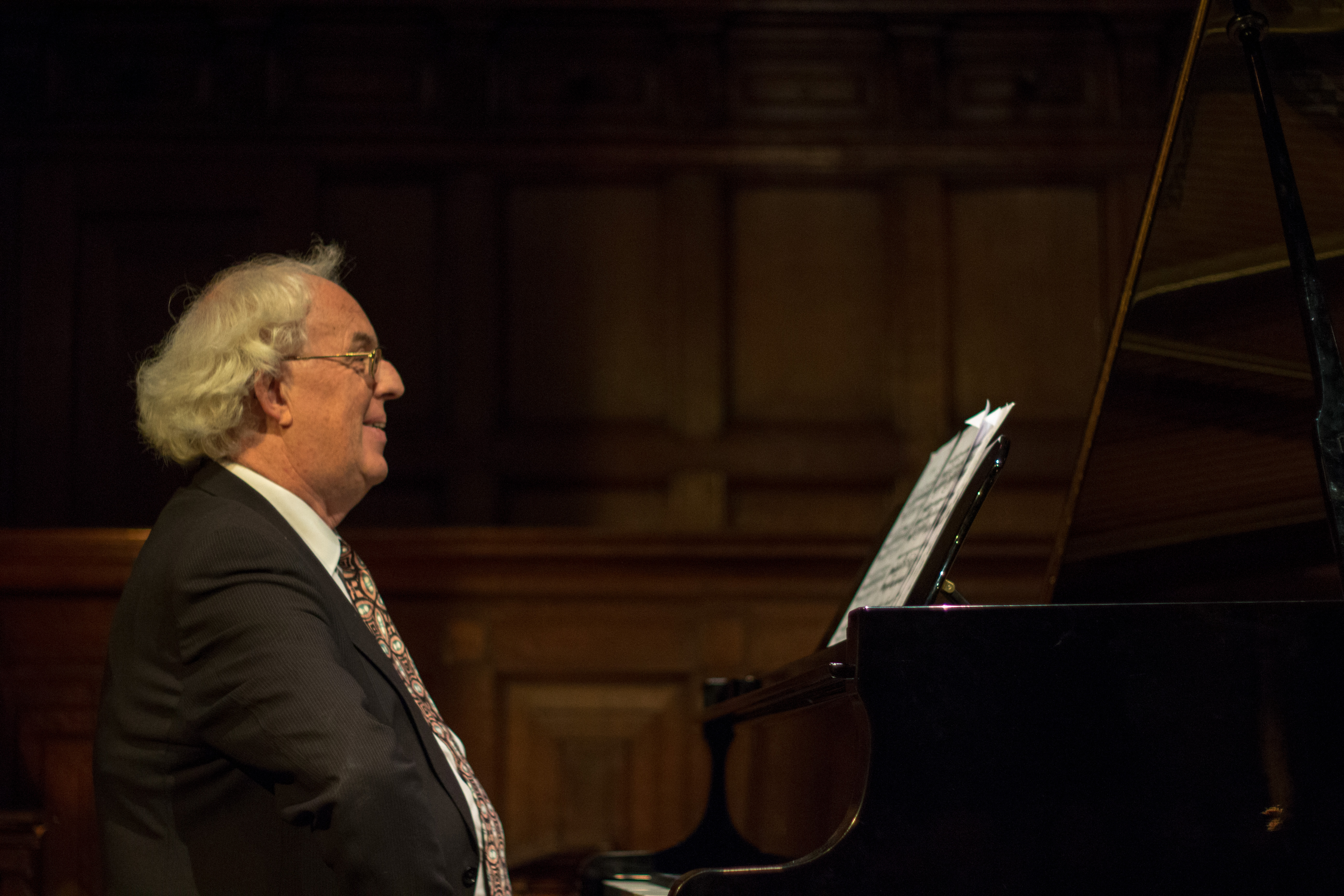
Frans van Ruth at a fundraising party in 2015

Cellist Doris Hochscheid and van Ruth have been playing a duo for many years, mostly at small private concerts or in concert halls around Europe. He is also co-founder of the Amsterdam Bridge Ensemble. Since 1997, Ruth is the main chamber music of the Amsterdam Conservatory. Since the late 1990s van Ruth remains active in his work usually performing about a dozen time a year at mostly private concerts but will do some general admission concerts through the Netherlands, Europe and most of Russia.

== Notable works ==
=== Albums ===
- Kleine prélude van ravel: for alto and piano (1970)
- Songs of Love and Death (2014)

=== Songs ===
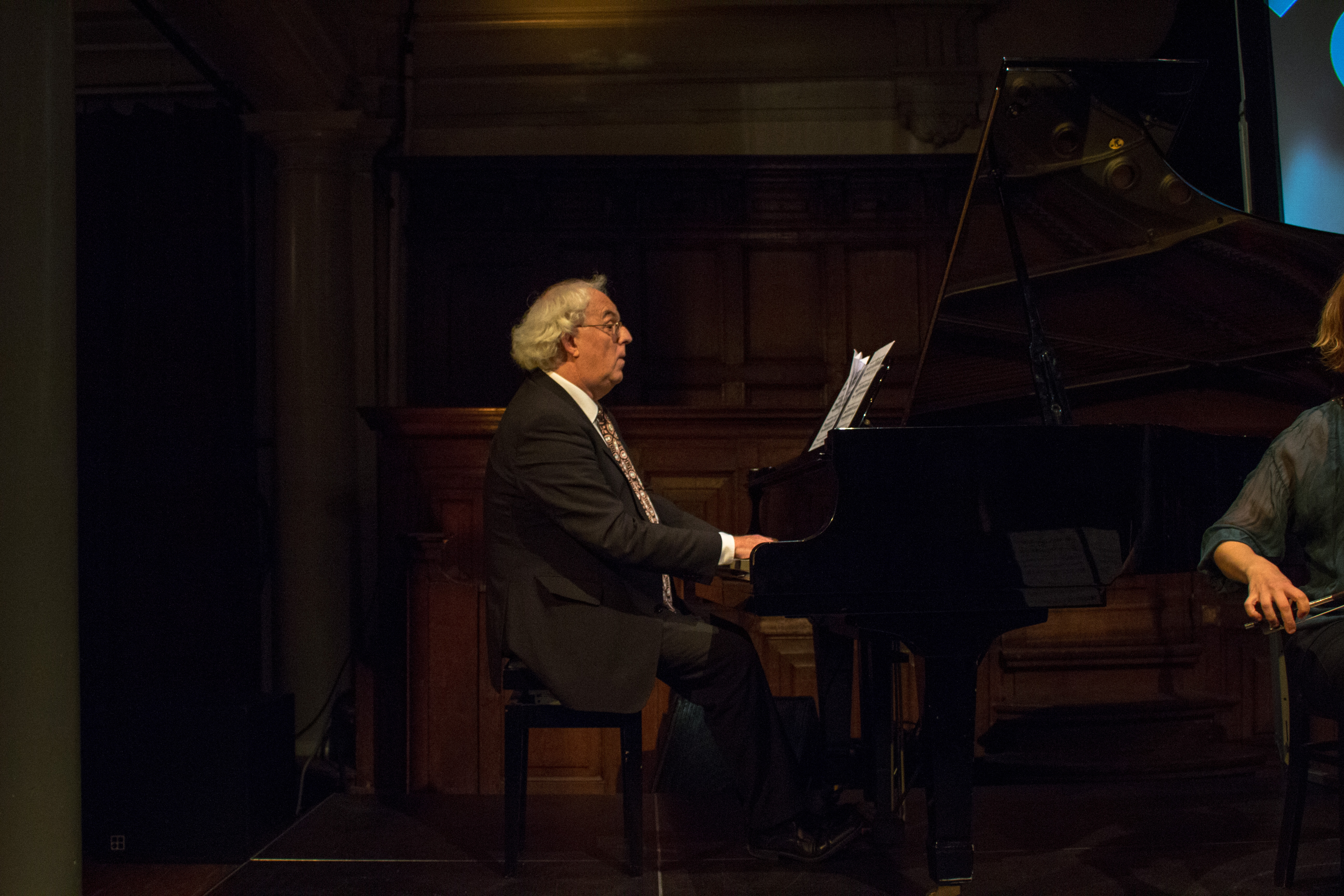
Frans van Ruth performing

- Trio: allegro vivace (1970)
- Pavane (1970)
- Sextuor Vivance (1971)
- Lento (1999)
- Hymme (2005)
- Verzen uit Maria Lecina (2005)
- Lied Für Piano (2009)

== Personal life ==
Van Ruth remains active in the musical world and is part of multiple music collectives and groups in Amsterdam and around the Netherlands.
