= Sergei Bortkiewicz =

Composer and pianist (1877–1952)

Sergei Bortkiewicz Сергей Борткевич
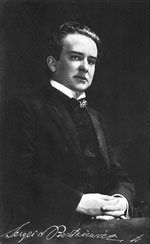
- Bortkiewicz in 1905

Background information
- Born: February 28, 1877; Kharkov, Russian Empire
- Died: October 25, 1952 (aged 75) Vienna, Austria
- Occupations: Composer; pianist
- Instrument: Piano

Sergei Eduardovich Bortkiewicz (Note: German: Sergei Eduardowitsch Bortkiewicz; Polish: Siergiej Bortkiewicz; Russian: Сергей Эдуардович Борткевич, romanized: Sergey Eduardovich Bortkevich; Ukrainian: Сергій Едуардович Борткевич, romanized: Serhii Eduardovych Bortkevych) (28 February 1877 [O.S. 16 February] – 25 October 1952) was a Romantic composer and pianist. He moved to Vienna in 1922 and became a naturalized Austrian citizen in 1926.

== Life ==
=== Early life and origins ===
Sergei Eduardovich Bortkiewicz was born in Kharkov in the Russian Empire (present-day Kharkiv, Ukraine), on 28 February 1877 to parents Edward and Zofia (née Uszyńska) Bortkiewicz, who were Polish nobility. He spent most of his childhood on the family estate of Artiomovka, near Kharkov. Bortkiewicz received his musical training from Anatoly Lyadov and Karel van Ark at the Imperial Conservatory of Music in Saint Petersburg.

In 1900, he left Saint Petersburg and travelled to Leipzig, where he became a student of Alfred Reisenauer and Salomon Jadassohn, both pupils of Franz Liszt. In July 1902, Bortkiewicz completed his studies at the Leipzig Conservatory and was awarded the Schumann Prize on graduation. On his return to the Russian Empire in 1904, he married Elisabeth Geraklitowa, a friend of his sister, and then returned to Germany, where he settled in Berlin. It was there that he started to compose seriously.

From 1904 until 1914, Bortkiewicz continued to live in Berlin but spent his summers visiting his family or travelling around Europe on concert tours. For a year he also taught at the Klindworth-Scharwenka Conservatory. There he met the Dutch pianist Hugo van Dalen, who became a lifelong friend. Van Dalen premiered Bortkiewicz's Piano Concerto No. 1, Op. 16, in November 1913 in Berlin with the Blüthner Orchestra conducted by the composer. It was the greatest success of Bortkiewicz's early period.

=== First World War ===
The outbreak of World War I in 1914 changed Bortkiewicz's life. As Russian citizens, he and his wife were both placed under house arrest, then deported from Germany to Russia, via Scandinavia. He returned to Kharkov, where he established himself as a music teacher, and also gave concerts.

The latter years of the war saw the beginning of the Russian Revolution, which forced the composer and his family to flee their estate at Artiomovka due to occupation by the Bolsheviks. In June 1919, the Bolsheviks fled before the White Army and Bortkiewicz was able to return and help rebuild the family estate, which had been completely plundered. While Bortkiewicz traveled to Yalta with his wife, Kharkov fell to the Red Army, which meant that he and his family could not return to Artiomovka. With the area now surrounded by the Red Army, the composer watched his mother and the husband of his sister Vera fall ill with typhus, both dying in the chaos at Novorossiysk. Bortkiewicz sought to escape from Yalta and succeeded in obtaining passage on the steamer Konstantin, which brought them safe, but impoverished, to Constantinople in November 1919.

=== Between the wars ===
In Constantinople, with the help of the court pianist to the Sultan, Ilen Ilegey, Bortkiewicz began to give concerts and started teaching again. He became well known throughout a number of embassies and made the acquaintance of the wife of the Yugoslavian ambassador Natalie Chaponitsch, to whom he dedicated his Trois Morceaux, Op. 24 (1922). She organised musical gatherings for Bortkiewicz within the embassy, and it was with the help of her husband that the composer and his wife were able to obtain a visa for Yugoslavia. Bortkiewicz and his wife came to Sofia via Belgrade, where they had to wait for some time before obtaining an Austrian visa. On 22 July 1922, the composer and his wife reached Austria.

Initially Bortkiewicz chose Baden as his residence, where he remained until 1923. He then moved and settled in Vienna, where he was to remain for the next five years. In 1926 he obtained Austrian citizenship.

In 1928, Bortkiewicz went to Paris for six months and then returned to live in Berlin. In 1933, he was forced to leave Germany again—being a Russian he was now facing persecution from the Nazis and saw his name being deleted from all music programmes. He returned to Vienna, where he established residence at Blechturmgasse 1 door 5 in 1935. He lived there for the rest of his life.

It was during these years that Bortkiewicz suffered with serious financial difficulties and needed to ask for financial help from his friend Hugo van Dalen many times, which the pianist always gave freely. It was also during this period that he translated from Russian into German the letters between Pyotr Ilyich Tchaikovsky and Nadezhda von Meck. These letters were published as Die seltsame Liebe Peter Tschaikowsky's und der Nadjeschda von Meck (Köhler & Amelang, Leipzig 1938). Van Dalen adapted Bortkiewicz's book for a Dutch readership and published it as Rondom Tschaikovsky's vierde symphonie (De Residentiebode, 1938).

=== Second World War ===
World War II profoundly affected Bortkiewicz and his wife. At the end of the war he described in a letter dated 8 December 1945 to his friend Hans Ankwicz-Kleehoven how he still lived:

I'm writing to you from my bathroom where we have crawled in because it is small and can be warmed on and off with a gas light. (!) The other rooms cannot be used and I cannot touch my piano. This is now! What awaits us further? Life is becoming more and more unpleasant, merciless. I teach at the Conservatory with the heat at 4 degrees, soon even less!

During this period he composed a number of works including his Piano Sonata No. 2, Op. 60. The sonata was first performed by the composer on 29 November 1942 in the Brahmssaal of the Musikverein in Vienna. Hugo van Dalen gave the Dutch premiere on 9 February 1944 in Amsterdam.

The war negatively impacted Bortkiewicz's finances. Most of his printed compositions were held by his German publishers Rahter & Litolff; they were destroyed in Allied bombing, resulting in the loss of all his income from the sale of his music. The health of Bortkiewicz and his wife declined to the point that they were admitted for treatment at the Franz Joseph Hospital in Vienna by its chief physician Dr. Walter Zdrahal, a friend of the couple. In later life, Bortkiewicz's wife was diagnosed as suffering from bipolar disorder.

=== After the War ===
In the autumn of 1945, Bortkiewicz was appointed director of a master class at the Vienna City Conservatory, which helped to give the composer some of the financial security he so sought. During this period he composed his Six Preludes, Op. 66 (1946–47), of which only two—Numbers 1 and 3—have so far been located. These preludes are dedicated to the Dutch pianist Hélène Mulholland (1912–2000), who helped him after the war by sending much needed food and clothes. After his retirement in 1948, the community of Vienna awarded him an honorary pension.

At the instigation of Hans Ankwicz-Kleehoven, a Bortkiewicz Society was founded in 1947 in Vienna in order to keep the memory of Bortkiewicz's music alive. The inaugural meeting took place in the library hall of the Akademie at Schillerplatz on 10 April 1947. As a result of that meeting, on the first Monday of each month from November to May, friends of the composer and members of the Society gathered in the Künstlerhaus and listened to concerts of the composer's music, much of which was played by Bortkiewicz himself. The Bortkiewicz Society was dissolved on 6 March 1973.

On 26 February 1952, the Bortkiewicz Society along with the Ravag Orchestra celebrated the 75th birthday of the composer at a concert in the Musikverein Hall in Vienna. Bortkiewicz conducted the orchestra with Felicitas Karrer playing the Piano Concerto No. 1, Op. 16, the violinist Jaro Schmied played his Des Frühlings und des Pans Erwachen—ein lyrisches Intermezzo nach Gemälden von Sandro Botticelli, Op. 44, and the concert was concluded with his Symphony No. 1, Op. 52, "Aus meiner Heimat", which contains a quotation from "God Save the Tsar" in the finale. This was to be his last great concert and the excitement of the event was illustrated in a letter to van Dalen dated 18 March 1952:

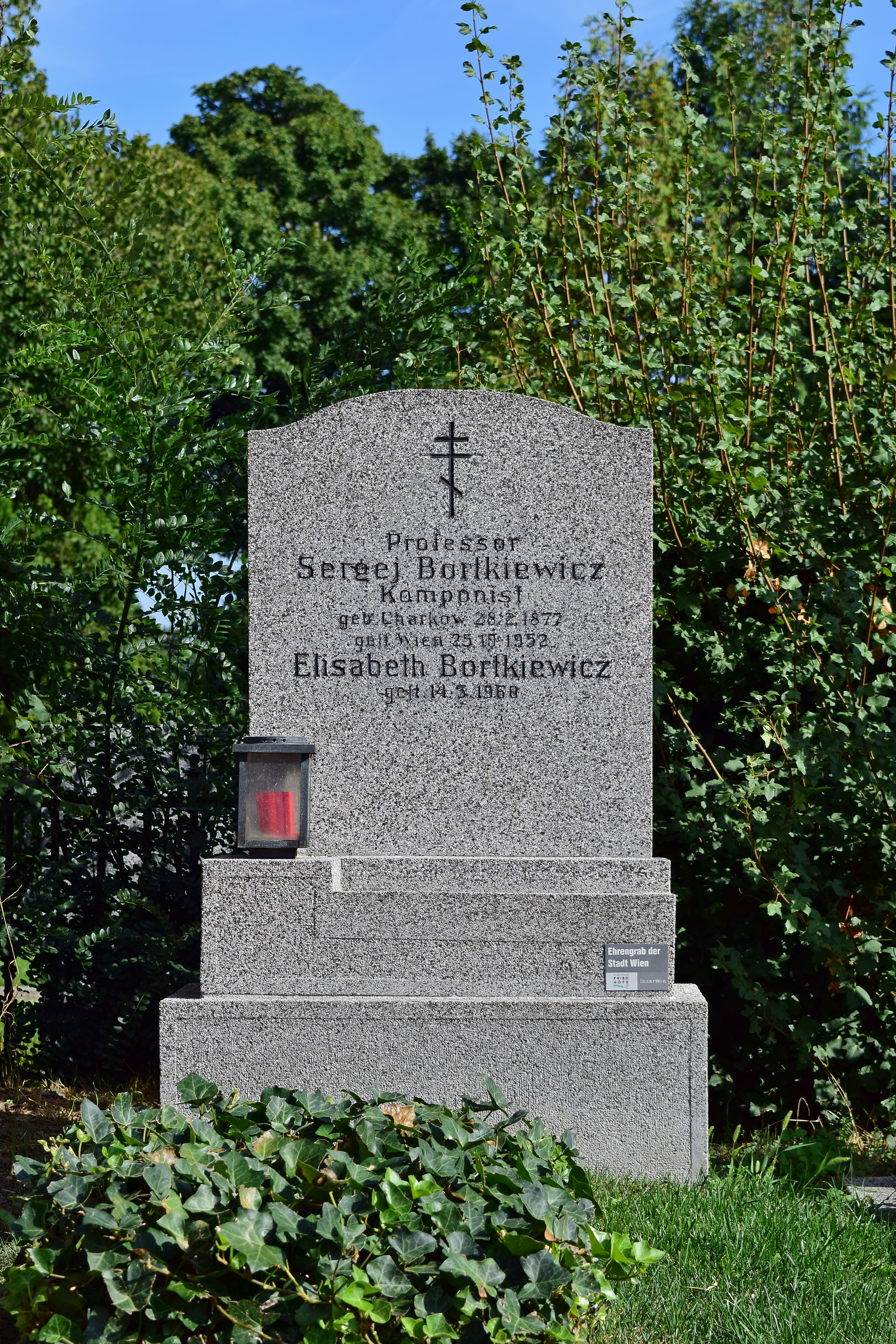
Tombstone, Vienna Central Cemetery

Finally I had the opportunity to show, in a large hall with a large orchestra and soloists, what I can do. Not only the critics, but others who know me, were surprised and amazed. ... I can always feel happy to have found so much recognition at the age of 75 years, which really comes in most cases after death to someone who really earned it.

Bortkiewicz had been suffering for some time from a stomach ailment and, on the advice of his physician, he decided to undergo an operation in October 1952. He never recovered and died in Vienna on 25 October of that year. His wife, Elisabeth, who was childless, died on 9 March 1960 in Vienna. Bortkiewicz and his wife are buried at the Zentralfriedhof, Vienna.

== Nationality ==
According to Jeremiah A. Johnson, Bortkiewicz referred to himself as Russian, his country of origin as "Little Russia" or "South Russia", and Kharkov as its intellectual capital. Johnson also said that Bortkiewicz opposed Ukrainian independence.

However, some other modern authors regard Bortkiewicz as either a Ukrainian composer (particularly Yi Jing Chen; Y. O. Levkulych), or as Ukrainian-born (Emma Scanlon).

== Works ==
Bortkiewicz's piano style was influenced by Franz Liszt, Frédéric Chopin, Tchaikovsky, Sergei Rachmaninoff, early Scriabin, Wagner, and Ukrainian folklore. The composer never saw himself as a modernist, as can be seen from his Künstlerisches Glaubensbekenntnis (artistic credo), written in 1923.

According to Boris Schwarz:

[Bortkiewicz's] craftsmanship was meticulous, his imagination colorful and sensitive, his piano writing idiomatic; a lush instrumentation underlines the essential sentimentality of his melodic invention ... Bortkiewicz mastered the skills of the past without adding anything distinctly personal or original ...

Johnson discussed certain elements of Ukrainian folk culture influenced Bortkiewicz's work.

When van Dalen died in 1967, he bequeathed to his family manuscripts of several Bortkiewicz compositions and an autobiography Erinnerungen (published in German in Musik des Ostens, 1971, pp. 136–69, in Dutch by Hugo van Dalen in De Zevende Dag, July–August 1939, and in English by B. N. Thadani, Recollections, 2nd ed., Cantext, 2001). A number of letters and printed scores were donated to the Gemeentemuseum in The Hague, which later became part of the collection of the Netherlands Music Institute. The latter has the only existing copy of the manuscript of the Piano Sonata No. 2, Op. 60, and of two of the Preludes, Op. 66.

== Recordings ==
- Symphonies Nos. 1 and 2. BBC Scottish Symphony Orchestra, Martyn Brabbins (Hyperion)
- Piano Concerto No. 1 in B-flat major, Op. 16. Marjorie Mitchell (piano), Vienna State Opera Orchestra, William Strickland (American Decca – Brunswick UK)
- Piano Concerto No. 1 in B-flat major, Op. 16. Stephen Coombs (piano), BBC Scottish Symphony Orchestra, Jerzy Maksymiuk (Hyperion)
- Pieces for Violin and Piano. Christian Persinaru (violin) and Nils Franke (piano) (Apex).
- Complete Piano works. Jouni Somero (FC-Records, in nine volumes)
- Complete Piano Music. Klaas Trapman (Piano Classics, six CDs)
- Piano works. Stephen Coombs (Hyperion, in two volumes)
- Piano works. Pierre Huybregts (Centaur)
- Piano works. Cyprien Katsaris (Piano21)
- Piano works. Pavel Gintov (Piano Classics)
- Piano works. Alfonso Soldano (Divine art)
- Piano pieces. Anna Reznik (Classical Recordings)
- Piano Concertos Nos. 2 and 3. Stefan Doniga (piano), Janáček Philharmonic Orchestra, David Porcelijn (Netherlands Muziek Instituut)
- Violin Concerto in D minor, Op. 22. Dutton Recording CDLX7323 Royal Scottish National Orchestra, Marin Yates (conductor), Sergey Levitin (violin)
- Symphonic Poem after Shakespeare's Othello, Op. 19. Dutton Recording CDLX7323 Royal Scottish National Orchestra, Marin Yates (conductor)
