= Simone Keller =

Swiss pianist

Simone Keller (born 23 March 1980) is a Swiss pianist.

Simone Keller, a classical pianist by training but with a transversal and interdisciplinary outlook, was born in Weinfelden, in the canton of Thurgau, in 1980. As an artist and performer, she feels at home in contemporary music, musical theatre, improvisation, and in experimental and participatory formats. A tireless initiator of musical projects, her ensembles are true frameworks for the exploration of contemporary sound: the Kukuruz Quartet (which researches in spectacular fashion the potential of prepared pianos played by eight hands), the TZARA Ensemble (which works between contemporary music and mediation) and the Retro Disco trio (with horn, cello and synthesisers). As a guest performer, Simone Keller has played regularly with ensembles such as the Musikkollegium Winterthur, the Southwest German Philharmonic, and the Collegium Novum Zurich. She has collaborated with renowned conductors like Peter Rundel, Jac van Steen, Pablo Heras-Casado, and others. Keller has also recorded various works, including Ustwolskaja's Piano Sonatas for the Böhlau-Verlag Wien and collaborated with institutions like the SWR Experimental Studio.

Additionally, she has a significant presence as a theater musician, participating in numerous productions at theaters like the Theater Basel and Schauspielhaus Zurich. Since 2014, Simone Keller has co-directed the production company ox&öl with the director Philip Bartels. The company conducts participatory projects at the Zurich Tonhalle and develops interdisciplinary music theater productions, including collaborations with individuals with cognitive impairments. ox&öl received recognition from the Department of Culture of the Canton of Zurich in 2017 for its cultural inclusion work and was nominated for the "Junge Ohren Preis" in Frankfurt in the same year.

Simone Keller has been invited to various international institutions, including the Cité Internationale des Arts in Paris in 2016, the Center for Computer Research in Music and Acoustics at Stanford University in 2017, and in 2019, invitations from Columbia University, Manhattan School of Music in New York, and Brown University in Providence/Boston.

In 2018, Keller's recording of Julius Eastman's piano music, released by Intakt Records with Kukuruz Quartet, received critical acclaim and appeared on several best-of lists, including being recognized as one of the "Best classical albums" by the Boston Globe and "Album of the year 2018" by The New York City Jazz Records. She was also nominated for the international innovation award by Classical:NEXT in 2019. In the same year, she received both the IBK Prize and the IBK Sponsorship Prize from the youth jury. Simone Keller is the recipient of the Conrad Ferdinand Meyer Prize in 2021.

In 2022, she was honored with both the Swiss Music Prize and the Thurgauer Culture Prize.

Simone Keller's 2024 publication "Hidden Heartache" (Jungle Books / Intakt Records) highlights the overlooked brilliance of marginalized composers, especially women and minorities, and explores themes of social inequality and unequal power relations through piano music and a collection of diverse essays.
