= Susan Merdinger =

- Born: 29 October 1962 (age 63)
- Origin: Yale University
- Genres: Classical
- Occupations: Classical pianist, Music Director, Professor of Piano
- Website: www.susanmerdingerpianist.com

Susan Merdinger (born October 29, 1962) is an American classical pianist, music director, and educator. Merdinger won a gold medal at the Global Music Awards in 2014.

== Education ==
Merdinger graduated from Yale University, the Yale School of Music, the Manhattan School of Music, the Westchester Conservatory of Music, and the École Normale de Musique in Fontainebleau, France.

== Career ==
Merdinger won a gold medal in the 2014 Global Music Awards, First Prize in the 2017 and 2012 Bradshaw and Buono International Piano Competition (in the Solo and Duo Piano divisions), the Dewar's Young Artist Award in Music (1990), as well as Artists International Young Musicians Competition (1986) and Artists International Distinguished Alumni Award (1990).
