= Antti Siirala =

Finnish pianist

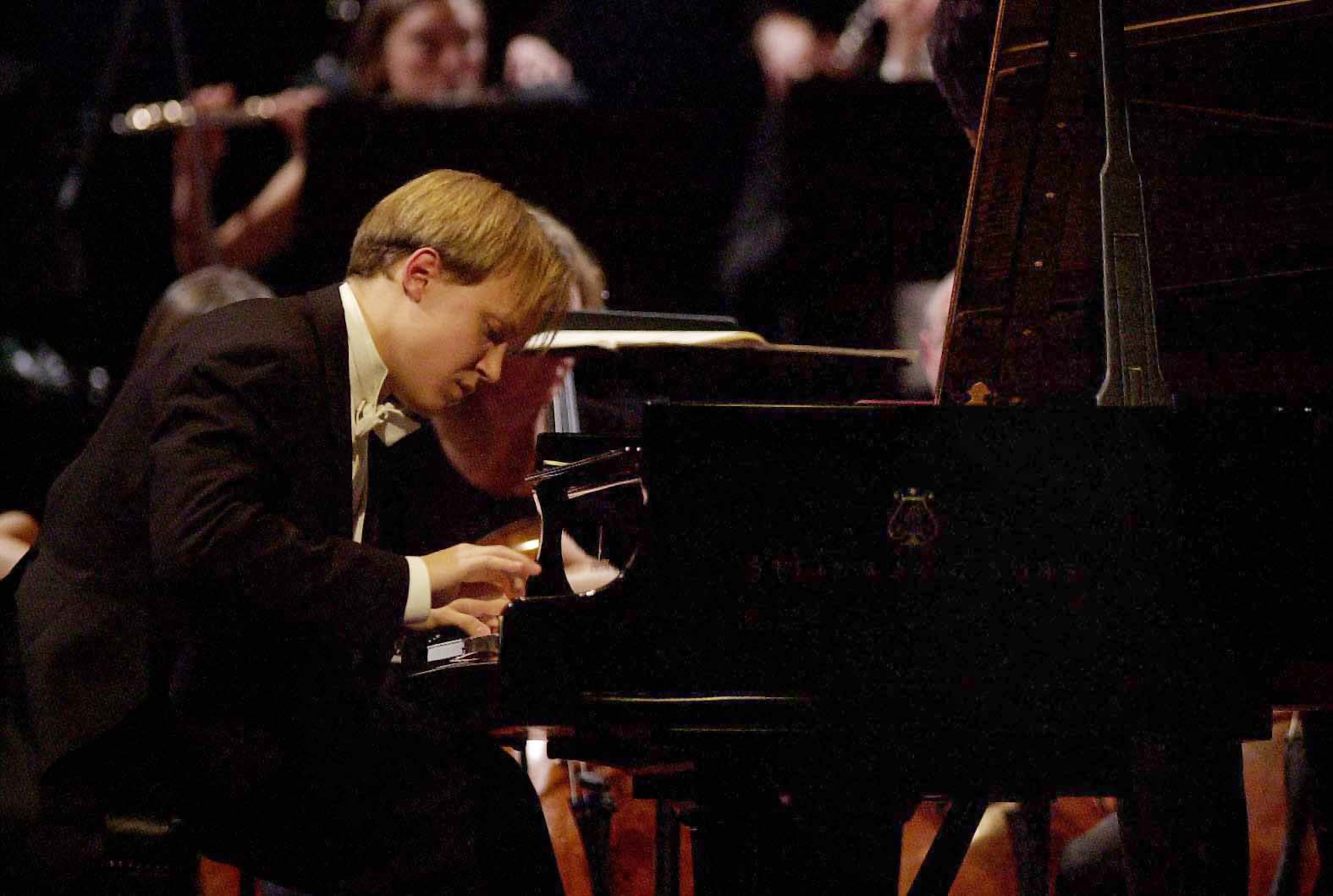
Antti Aleksi Siirala

Antti Aleksi Siirala (born 16 May 1979 in Helsinki) is a Finnish pianist.

== Career ==
Antti Siirala's international career was launched when he won First Prize in the 10th Vienna Beethoven competition as the youngest contestant, receiving Award for the Best Performance of a Late Beethoven Sonata (op. 106 “Hammerklavier”). Subsequently, he was awarded First Prize in the London International Piano Competition in 2000, the Dublin International Piano Competition and the Leeds International Piano Competition in 2003.

In February 2005, Siirala gave a debut recital at the Cologne Philharmonie.

He performed with the WDR Sinfonieorchester Köln under Semyon Bychkov and the City of Birmingham Symphony Orchestra during the 2009-2010 season.

In October 2009, Antti Siirala debuted with the San Francisco Symphony Orchestra under Osmo Vänskä.

In April 2010, he performed as one of four pianists (next to Pierre-Laurent Aimard, Lang Lang, and Martin Helmchen) in the piano series of the Berliner Philharmoniker. In August 2010, Siirala played with the Mostly Mozart Orchestra at the Lincoln Center.

His recordings of Schubert and Brahms transcriptions received the Gramophone Magazine's Editor's Choice award in August 2003 and August 2004 respectively. Beethoven and Brahms are at the core of Siirala's repertoire, but his interest in contemporary music has resulted in first performances of works by Walter Gieseler, Kuldar Sink, Uljas Pulkkis, and the premiere of the new piano concerto by Kalevi Aho. Kaija Saariaho's first work for piano solo, “Balladen”, is part of his recital programme.

== Discography ==
- Schubert Piano Transcriptions by Liszt, Prokofiev, Busoni and Godowsky. Naxos 8.555997 (2003)
- Johannes Brahms: Sonata in F Minor; 16 Waltzes. Ondine ODE 1044-2 (2004)
- Kalevi Aho: Piano Concerto No. 2. Lahti Symphony Orchestra / Osmo Vänskä. BIS-CD-1316 (2010)
- Ludwig van Beethoven: Late Sonatas Nos. 30 - 32, op. 109/110/111. CAvi (2012)
- Franz Schubert: Quintet for Piano and Strings in A Major D667 "Trout". Benjamin Schmid, Violin / Lars Anders Tomter, Viola / Jan Vogler, Cello / Janne Saksala, Double bass. Sony (2012)
- Franz Schubert: Die Forelle (The Trout) D 550. Jan Vogler, Cello / Janne Saksala, Doublebass. Sony (2012)
- Matthew Whittall: Hors d`oeuvre. Sony (2012)
- Ludwig van Beethoven: Triple-Concerto op. 56. Colin Jacobsen, Violin / Jan Vogler, Cello / The Knights / Eric Jacobsen. Sony (2012)
