= Yella Pessl =

American musician

Yella Pessl (originally Gabriella Elsa Pessl; January 5, 1906 – December 9, 1991) was an American harpsichordist, pianist and organist.

== Life ==
She was born in Vienna in 1906; she studied there at the State Academy of Music, and later performed in Europe.

In 1931 she moved to the USA, and was resident in New York. She toured extensively, giving solo recitals and playing with orchestras. In 1938 she accompanied the Trapp Family Singers, whom she had known in Vienna, at their debut in New York at the Town Hall.

Yella Pessl was an editor of music for the harpsichord, and wrote about music for the instrument. From 1938 she was a member of staff at Columbia University. She founded the Bach Circle, a group specializing in lesser-known works of J. S. Bach and his contemporaries. Between 1937 and 1942, she recorded 49 discs for Victor. The works include J.S. Bach's Sonatas 1, 2 and 4 for flute and harpsichord, Suites 5 and 6 of the English Suites, and Partita No.3; C. P.E. Bach's Sonata in A Minor for harpsichord, G.F. Handel's Fantasie in A Minor, W. F. Bach's Sonata in C Minor for Viola and Harpsichord, which she arranged; Works of Georg Böhm; Music of Henry Purcell and Works of John Mundy.

Her husband was Dr. Harry Sobotka, a biochemist; he died in 1970. Yella Pessl died in 1991, aged 85, at her home in Northampton, Massachusetts.
