= Nina Svetlanova =

- Born: January 23, 1932 (age 94); Kiev, Ukrainian SSR
- Died: 24 July 2024 (aged 92) New York City
- Genres: Classical
- Occupations: Educator, Concert pianist
- Instrument: Piano
- Website: www.ninasvetlanova.com

Nina Yakovlevna Svetlanova (née Mosnaim, born in Kiev, Ukraine Ukrainian SSR, 23 January 1932 - 24 July 2024) was a Russian-American concert pianist and educator.

== Biography ==
Born Nina Yakovlevna Mosnaim, Svetlanova was a piano student of Grigory Kogan and Sofia Kogan at the Gnesin Music College, where she studied since the age of five (1937–1948). Svetlanova subsequently attended the Moscow Conservatory, where her teachers included Heinrich Neuhaus, with whom she studied from age 16 to 23 (1948–1955). She graduated from the Moscow Conservatory in 1955).

Following graduation, Svetlanova became an opera coach at the Bolshoi Theatre. Later she became a pianist in the official roster of the Moscow Philharmonic Concert Association ('Moskonzert'), the main bureau responsible for all concerts in the USSR. As a Moskonzert pianist, Svetlanova toured the world playing with instrumentalists and ensembles, and worked closely with such artists as Zara Dolukhanova.

Svetlanova moved to New York City in 1975. She was a professor of piano at the Manhattan School of Music and Mannes College of Music since the late 1970s. Her students included Josu de Solaun Soto, Hyung-ki Joo, and Brian Zeger. She became a naturalized United States citizen in 1983.

Svetlanova's first husband was the conductor Yevgeny Svetlanov. Her second husband was Edward Lekhmus who passed in 1987 at age of 52. Svetlanova died in New York City, age 92. She was preceded by her son Yura Lekhmus (1994 at age 33). She is survived by her son Igor Lekhmus and his wife, along with 3 grandchildren, and 6 great grandchildren.
