= Piano Concerto No. 4 (Rachmaninoff) =

Composition by Sergei Rachmaninoff

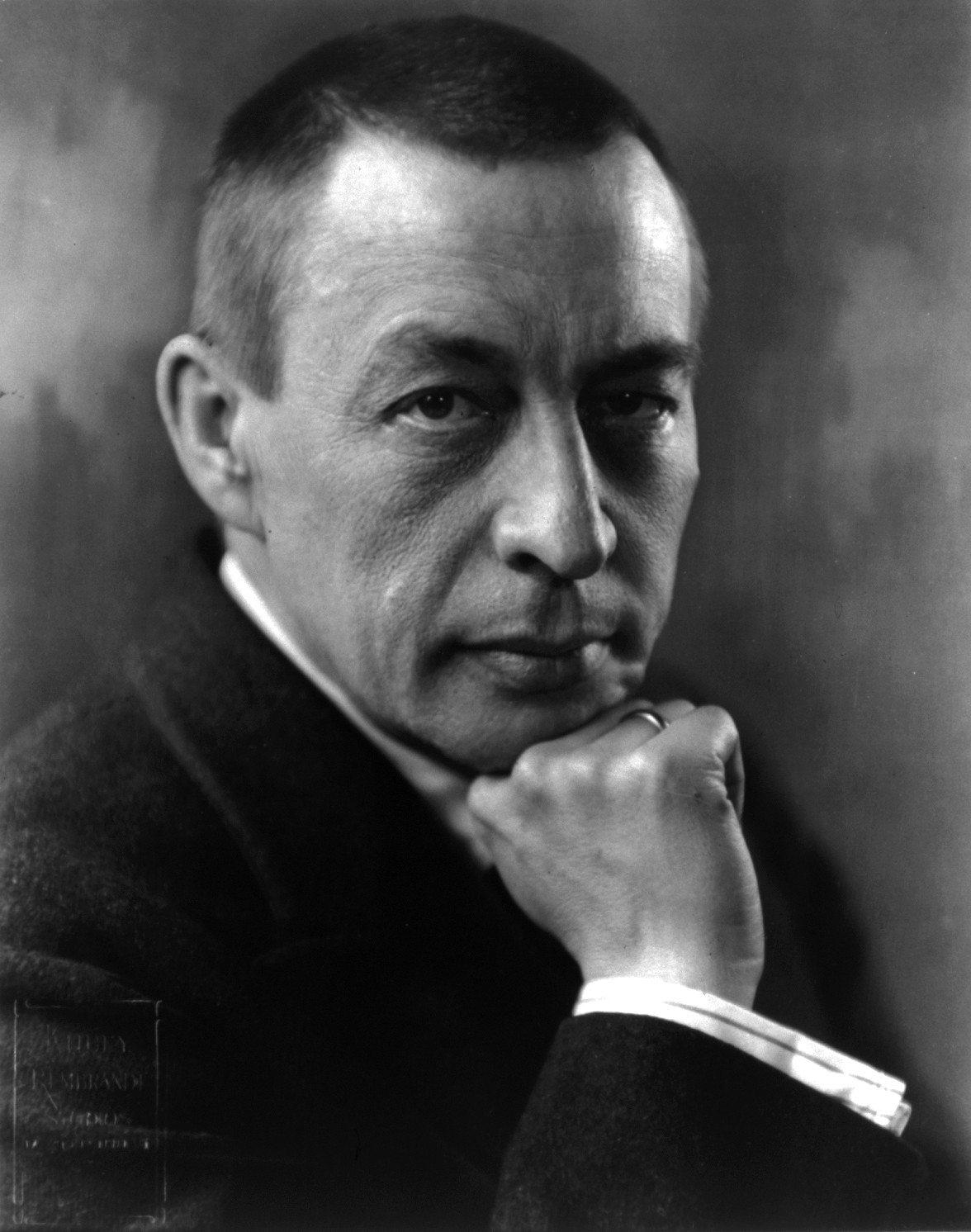
Sergei Rachmaninoff in 1921

Piano Concerto No. 4 in G minor, Op. 40, is a concerto for piano and orchestra by Russian composer Sergei Rachmaninoff, completed in 1926. The work exists in three versions. Following its unsuccessful premiere (1st version), the composer made cuts and other amendments before publishing it in 1928 (2nd version). With continued lack of success, he withdrew the work, eventually revising and republishing it in 1941 (3rd version, most generally performed today). The original manuscript version was released in 2000 by the Rachmaninoff Estate to be published and recorded.

The work is dedicated to Nikolai Medtner, who in turn dedicated his Second Piano Concerto to Rachmaninoff the following year.

== Form ==
External audio
- Performed by Vladimir Ashkenazy with the London Symphony Orchestra under André Previn
- I. Allegro vivace (Alla breve)
- II. Largo
- III. Allegro vivace

Compared with its predecessors, the Fourth Concerto contains sharper thematic profiles along with a refinement of textures in keyboard and orchestra. These qualities do not lead to greater simplicity but to a different sort of complexity. It was also a continuation of Rachmaninoff's long-range creative growth: the Third Concerto and the recomposed First Concerto were less heavily orchestrated than the Second Concerto. In keeping with its general character, the Fourth Concerto is lighter still, yet more oblique.

The concerto is in three movements:

1. Allegro vivace (G minor).
2. Largo (C major)
3. Allegro vivace (G minor → D♭ major → G major)

Rachmaninoff had already been making a more extensive use of short thematic motifs and strong rhythmic patterns in his Op. 32 Preludes, in place of what was called the "unmentionable restlessness" that made his work, especially the concertos, a distressing experience for some musicians. This refinement of musical language, especially in orchestration, went back at least to The Bells and a more astringent tone was already noticeable in songs like "The Raising of Lazarus", Op. 34, No. 6.

The orchestra consists of piccolo, 2 flutes, 2 oboes, English horn, 2 clarinets, 2 bassoons, 4 horns, 2 trumpets, 3 trombones, tuba, percussion (triangle, tambourine, snare drum, bass drum, cymbals), and strings.

== Influences ==
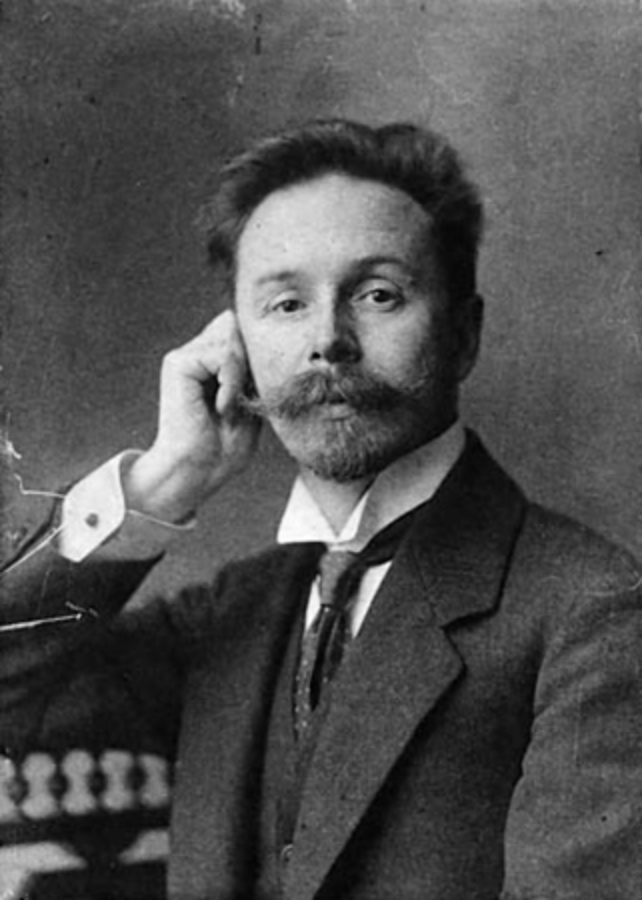
Studying Alexander Scriabin's music for a series of memorial recitals also influenced Rachmaninoff's writing style.

=== Modern classical music ===
What Rachmaninoff heard around him proved that politics was not the only thing that had changed since the October Revolution. Even if he did not like most of what he heard, he was at least aware of what Bartók, Hindemith, Stravinsky, Schoenberg and Les Six were writing. Even before the Revolution, in 1916, Russian critic Leonid Sabaneyev noticed a change in Rachmaninoff's style when the composer played eight of his nine Op. 39 Études-Tableaux:

This great talent is now in a period of search. Evidently the individuality originally formed by the composer (the culmination of which I consider to be the extraordinary Second Concerto) has for some reason ceased to satisfy the composer.

The searches of a great talent are always interesting. Although personally I cannot consider Rachmaninov a musical phenomenon of the highest order … nevertheless one senses in him a tremendous inner power, a potential that some barrier prevents from emerging fully … his artistic personality contains the promise of something greater than he has yet given us.

Other critics also noticed a new angularity and pungency in these études, along with a more severe, concentrated and deepened mode of expression. This was influenced in part by Rachmaninoff's study of Scriabin's music for the memorial recitals he played in 1915; this study bore further fruit in the works Rachmaninoff wrote after leaving Russia.

Had Rachmaninoff stayed in Russia, and the Bolsheviks' rise to power never taken place, the Fourth Piano Concerto probably would have been premiered around 1919, eight years earlier than its actual unveiling. It is also possible that in the fertile creative ground of the composer's estate of Ivanovka, where many of his major pieces grew to fruition, the concerto might have become a wholly different composition, albeit probably no less adventurous than the work we know today.

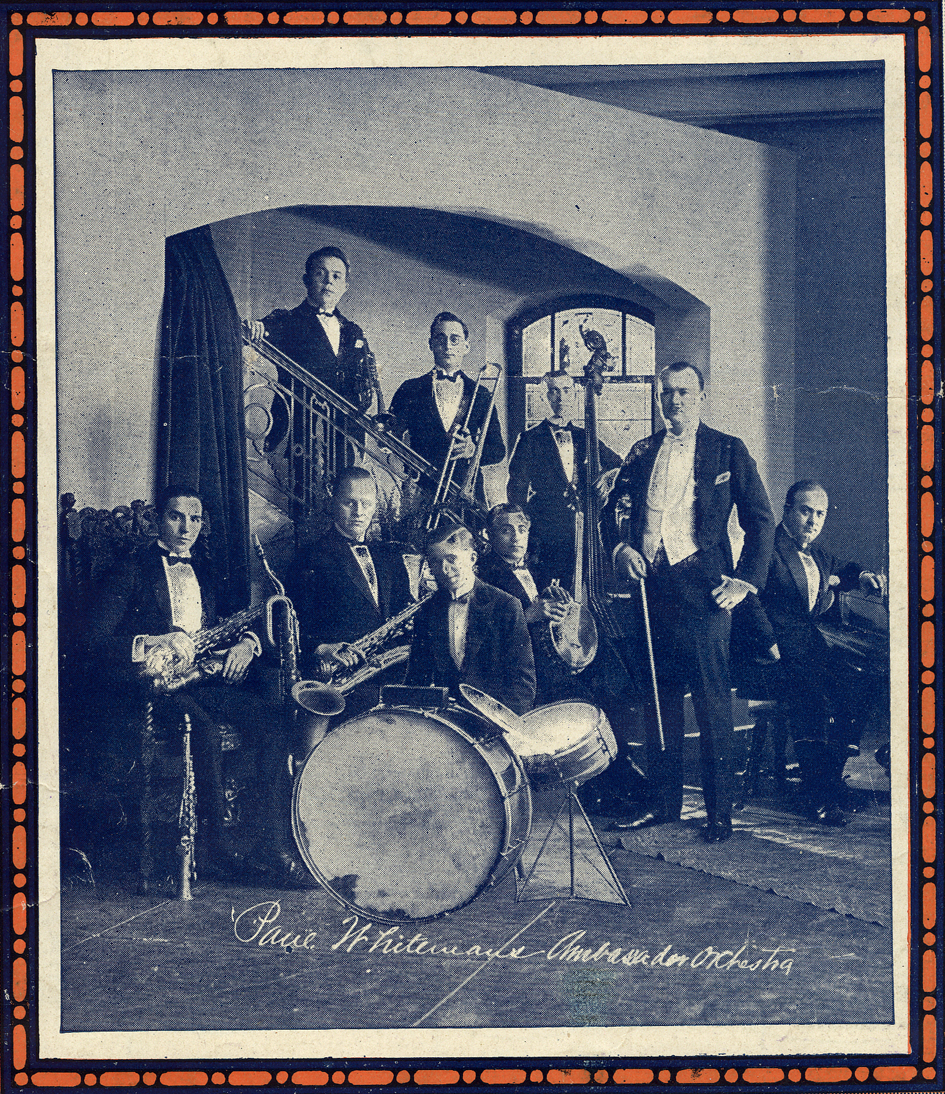
Paul Whiteman and his band in 1921. Rachmaninoff was a great enthusiast of their music.

=== Jazz ===
Many have noted Rachmaninoff's inspiration from George Gershwin's Rhapsody in Blue, a piece for piano and orchestra completed in 1924, only three years before Rachmaninoff finished his own. Though he was unable to attend the premiere of the Gershwin Rhapsody on February 12, 1924 due to a prior recital engagement at the Ararat Temple, Kansas, Missouri that same evening, he attended other performances of Gershwin's piano and orchestra works including Concerto in F, Second Rhapsody, Variations on I Got Rhythm, and eventually Rhapsody in Blue in the 1920s and 30s. Sometimes less remembered is that he was a faithful and longtime enthusiast of Paul Whiteman's jazz orchestra, which hosted the Rhapsody in Blue premiere, even sending his daughter the Whiteman orchestra's newest records every month. He also listened to orchestral jazz by both the black jazz orchestras then playing regularly in New York — those of Fletcher Henderson and Duke Ellington — and later became a devoted enthusiast of pianist Art Tatum. Tenor John McCormack remembered Rachmaninoff himself playing jazz for his own amusement.

These jazz elements, most felt, were not consistent with Rachmaninoff's previous brooding and dark themes. What they failed to realize was that, though some aspects of the concerto had roots in Imperial Russia, the piece had been written mainly in New York, and finished in Western Europe. The composer was a sharp, intelligent and sensitive man who had naturally been affected by the sights and sounds of the country in which he had resided for the last several years. Any romantic aura had long dissipated.

== Overview ==
The concerto is probably the least known of all Rachmaninoff's piano concertos, but it is frequently performed in Russia. There may be several reasons for this. The structure was criticized for being amorphous and difficult to grasp on a single hearing. Only the second movement (Largo) contains a prominent melody, while the external movements seem to be composed mainly of virtuosic piano runs and cadenzas. Like most of Rachmaninoff's late works, the concerto has a daring chromaticism and a distinctive jazzy quality.

=== Composition ===
Rachmaninoff left Russia with his family on December 23, 1917 for a concert date in Stockholm, Sweden, never to return. Life as an émigré with a wife and two daughters to support meant that composition was out of the question, at least for a while. He also needed time to renew himself. Rachmaninoff had composed intensely during much of his career in Russia. Aside from the requirements of his pianistic career, it may have been more dignified for Rachmaninoff to endure a period of creative silence than to merely repeat what he had written before. If his subsequent compositions were to be relevant to his new situation, he needed time to learn and explore his new parameters.

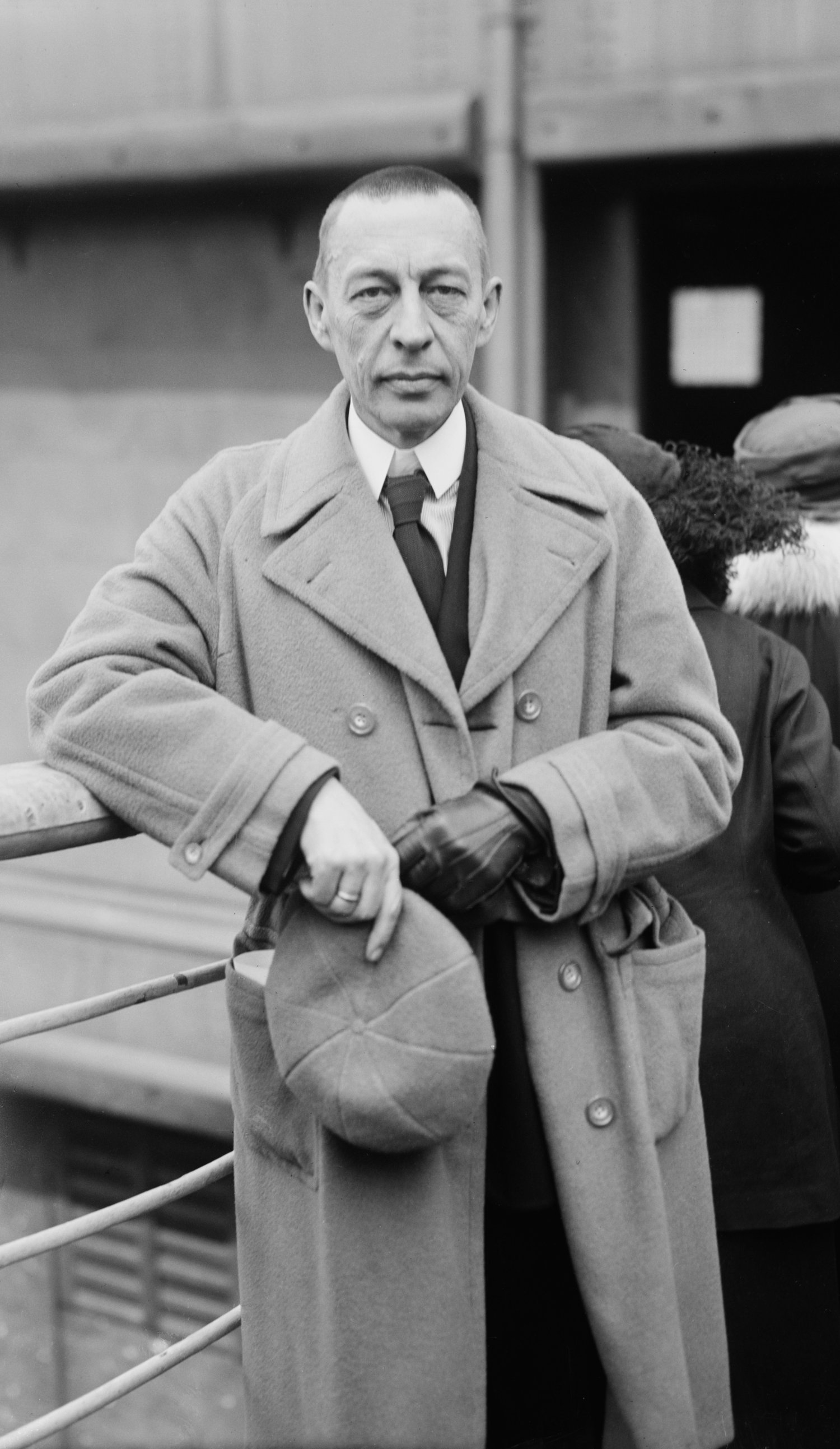
Sergei Rachmaninoff.

In Dresden, where he had done much composing in the past, Rachmaninoff began to think specifically about composing again. He wrote his friend and fellow exile Nikolai Medtner, "I've already started to work. Am moving slowly." After eight years of touring, he took a sabbatical at the end of 1925, working on the Fourth Concerto. He may have begun this work as early as 1911: the end of the slow movement from rehearsal number 39 has in the orchestral part the same nine-bar passage as the Etude-Tableau, Op. 33/3 from bar 30. This Etude-Tableau derives from 1911 and was pulled from the advertised publication in 1914. In fact it was not published at all during Rachmaninoff's lifetime. The April 12 issue of Muzyka points to 1914: While Rachmaninoff had gone to Ivanovka earlier than usual that year, in March, he did not return to Moscow that October with a finished composition, contrary to his usual custom. All he reportedly had were three sketch books and various separate sheets of manuscript paper. The composer brought this material with him from Russia in 1917; it is now housed in the Library of Congress. He may have also tinkered with sketches in his early years in the United States. Although composition at that time was for the most part out of the question, sketches for the finale of the concerto are on the back of the manuscript sheets of his cadenza for Liszt's Hungarian Rhapsody No. 2. These sheets are also at the Library of Congress.

Though he made a good start on the piece, he was also interrupted numerous times — not least among which being the sudden death of his son-in-law, who had married his daughter Irina less than a year previously. With this tragedy and other challenges which arose, Rachmaninoff did not finish the work until the end of the following August. On top of this, Rachmaninoff's already self-critical tendencies were heightened. He complained to Medtner on September 8 of the size of the score (110 pages) and that it "will have to be performed like The Ring: on several evenings in succession." Medtner replied five days later that he could not agree with Rachmaninoff about the concerto being too long, or about his general attitude about length. "Actually, your concerto amazed me by the fewness of its pages, considering its importance... Naturally, there are limitations to the lengths of musical works, just as there are dimensions for canvasses. But within these human limitations, it is not the length of musical compositions that creates an impression of boredom, but it is rather the boredom that creates the impression of length." The pianist Josef Hofmann, another friend to whom Rachmaninoff showed the score, also encouraged him. Hofmann said he liked the new concerto very much, and he hoped that — while its frequent metric changes might make playing the piece with an orchestra difficult — it would not prove an obstacle to future performances. "It certainly deserves them from a musical as well as a pianistic point of view."

Rachmaninoff saw two specific problems with the work: the third movement, which he found too drawn out, and the fact that the orchestra is almost never silent throughout the piece (although the latter tendency is fully evident in the composer's Second Concerto, as well). He concluded that he would have to make cuts in the score. Rachmaninoff had made changes to works in the past, after he had heard or performed them. Along with his having been away from the composer's desk for several years, this insecurity in deciding how his ideas should be expressed may account for what some contemporary critics considered the fractured nature of the Fourth.

The concerto was premiered in Philadelphia on March 18, 1927, with the composer as soloist and Leopold Stokowski leading the Philadelphia Orchestra. After a second performance on March 19, Rachmaninoff performed the work with Stokowski and the Philadelphia Orchestra in New York on March 22. The Three Russian Songs, Op. 41, for chorus and orchestra were also given their first three performances on these same occasions; the Three Russian Songs were favourably received each time, the concerto less so.

=== Reception ===
Critical reaction was universally scathing, prompting the most vitriolic reviews Rachmaninoff had received since the premiere of his First Symphony in 1897. In some ways, this should have been expected, especially by the composer. It can easily be compared to reaction to the late works of Debussy, Fauré and Roussel. These men, like Rachmaninoff, had been labeled as conservatives. They all made subsequent developments wholly integral to their compositional styles which were considered by critics as a weakening of creative power rather than as a refinement of it. Moreover, Rachmaninoff's Third Piano Concerto was panned initially for not being a near-copy of its predecessor. Together, these two pieces gave the impression of a compositional norm from which Rachmaninoff was not expected to depart. At the same time, the romanticism of these works would have been fatuous in light of what people like Rachmaninoff had recently gone through before leaving Russia.

In any case, Lawrence Gilman, who had written the programme notes for the concerto, complained in the Herald Tribune of "thinness and monotony" in the new work, that it was "neither so expressive nor so effective as its famous companion in C minor". Pitts Sanborn of the Telegram called the concerto "long-winded, tiresome, unimportant, in places tawdry", describing it as "an interminable, loosely knit hodge-podge of this and that, all the way from Liszt to Puccini, from Chopin to Tchaikovsky. Even Mendelssohn enjoys a passing compliment." After stating that the work glittered "with innumerable stock trills and figurations" and the orchestration was as "rich as nougot", he called the music itself "now weepily sentimental, now of an elfin prettiness, now swelling toward bombast in a fluent orotundity. It is neither futuristic music nor music of the future. Its past was a present in Continental capitals half a century ago. Taken by and large — and it is even longer than it is large — this work could fittingly be described as super-salon music. Mme. Cécile Chaminade might safely have perpetrated it on her third glass of vodka."

The relative modernity of the Fourth Concerto as presented in 1927 did not stem primarily from a higher level of dissonance compared to the Second and Third Concertos but from its inherent compositional attitude. Its formal structures were more elliptical than those of its predecessors. Its musical statements shifted more, were less direct. The elusiveness of some themes was heightened by the overt directness of others.

=== More cuts ===
Rachmaninoff became discouraged by the Fourth Concerto's lack of success, in both its original and its revised forms. After the initial performances, Rachmaninoff made cuts and other revisions, reducing the first movement from 367 to 346 bars and the finale from 567 to 476 bars; he also removed a few bars from the central Largo. Altogether, he shortened the piece from 1,016 to 902 bars. This was the state in which the concerto was published in 1928 by the composer's publishing firm TAIR in Paris. The British premiere of the work was given on December 2, 1928 by Lev Pouishnoff in a BBC broadcast from Manchester and played several times in the UK in 1929. It was performed in mainland Europe the following year. These were no more successful than the initial performances. Rachmaninoff, more discouraged, withdrew the work until he had time to rework the piece more thoroughly.

Pianists Vladimir Ashkenazy, Leslie Howard and Yevgeny Sudbin, and biographer Max Harrison have argued that, as with his Second Piano Sonata, Rachmaninoff got everything about the Fourth Concerto right the first time. They find it extremely disappointing that he yielded to adverse opinion, repeatedly making changes that weakened what had initially been a powerfully original work. While these revisions might imply an undue willingness to compromise, the motivation for making those changes may have been incomprehension. Rachmaninoff himself may simply not have fathomed the true nature of this composition, especially when it was first performed. The musicologist Geoffrey Norris, in contrast, argued that Rachmaninoff did not go far enough in his revisions. He claimed that, had Rachmaninoff tackled the basic structural deficiencies of the work, it might have been received more sympathetically than it actually was.

=== Revision ===
Though Rachmaninoff talked about revisiting the Fourth Concerto after finishing the Third Symphony, he put off going over the score until 1941, 15 years after initially completing it. It thus became the last original composition on which he worked. While not changing the basic thematic material, Rachmaninoff revised the orchestration, simplified the piano writing in the central Largo, and thoroughly overhauled the finale. He also made cuts additional to the ones he had made in 1928. He reduced the first movement from 346 to 313 bars, the slow movement from 80 to 77 bars and, most invasively, the finale from 476 to 434 bars. This brought the complete work from 902 to 824 bars. He also recast much of the music to dispense with unnecessary themes and create a more compact structure.

That fall, Rachmaninoff premiered the revised Fourth, again in Philadelphia but with Eugene Ormandy conducting. Edwin Schloss wrote in his review for The Philadelphia Record,

The Fourth Concerto as heard yesterday is a revision of a work first heard here 14 years ago from Rachmaninoff's hands. The revision, which is extensive, was made last summer and yesterday's performance was the concerto's first anywhere in its present form. It turned out to be nobly-meant and darkly romantic music, somewhat fragmentary in shape and typically Rachmaninoffian in spirit. And, with all due respect to the great artist who wrote it, and for all its fine pianism, a trifle dull. Its playing, however, added up to news in any season — news that becomes increasingly miraculous as the years go by, namely, that for all his 68 years, Rachmaninoff is still one of the most virile and brilliant young pianists before the public today.

Ormandy and Rachmaninoff played the revised Fourth, with the Second Symphony, in Washington, Baltimore, and eventually New York, as well as recording the work for RCA. Still, Rachmaninoff was never fully satisfied with the work, continuing to tinker with the orchestration even in the days immediately before his recording session with Ormandy, and lamenting that he did not find the time to reorchestrate the piece to his satisfaction. Many of these changes never found their way into the printed score; however, they have made it onto recordings by other pianists who have studied the composer's own recording, including Vladimir Ashkenazy, Stephen Hough, Leonard Pennario and Earl Wild.

Whatever might be thought about the 1941 revision, there is an elimination of rhetoric and ornamentation. Moreover, there is a sharper demand on involvement from the soloist than in some parts of the Third Concerto. The exposition of the finale is an especially fine instance of the architectural quality of rhythm in the performance of this work. Altogether, the immense virtuosity of the finale on the whole is not showy passagework to please audiences. It is hectic, full of action, unstoppable in its energy and power.

Rachmaninoff was engaged in writing a two-piano reduction of this final version when he died. At his widow's request, Robert Russell Bennett completed the reduction.

=== Manuscript version ===
In 2000 the Rachmaninoff Estate authorized Boosey & Hawkes, with the expert assistance of Robert Threlfall and Leslie Howard, to publish the uncut 1926 manuscript version of the Fourth Concerto. Ondine Records recorded the work with pianist Alexander Ghindin and the Helsinki Philharmonic under Vladimir Ashkenazy. The publication of the uncut manuscript drew considerable interest because of Rachmaninoff's alterations of the Second Symphony and Second Piano Sonata in the 1930s. Rachmaninoff's changes in those works included large cuts, a number of minor textual rewritings, and a few newly composed segments to attempt cementing a fragmented structure. Access to the manuscript of the Fourth Piano Concerto could therefore show what the composer may have initially had in mind, structurally speaking, and what he might have obfuscated in the process of revision.

In an interview with Elger Niels, Ashkenazy called the manuscript version much closer to the Third Piano Concerto than to its subsequent revisions. After studying all three versions, conducting two and playing one, Ashkenazy concluded that, in principle, he preferred the manuscript edition. His main reason for this was that the Finale worked much better in the manuscript version, since the second subject is repeated. Even so, he does not consider the movement an unqualified success:

It might have been better if Rachmaninoff had rewritten the entire movement. And even as it is, what if Rachmaninoff had not cut it up but just modified the end? Perhaps he could have introduced this wonderful second subject to work it up to a kind of coda — not necessarily as glorifying as in the Third Piano Concerto, but still elegantly (because the harmonies are absolutely wonderful there), and end brilliantly. Maybe that would have made it.

Russian pianist Yevgeny Sudbin, in the liner notes for his recording of the 1926 version, goes further, wishing Rachmaninoff had "stuck to his guns" and not revised the concerto, "as the original versions [of his works] are usually superior, in terms of both form and emotional impact" The manuscript version reveals more pungent harmonies and a more violent set of musical contrasts. Especially in the Finale, these juxtapositions result in some strident episodes absent from either of the revisions, making the movement, in Sudbin's words, "too truncated." Because of Rachmaninoff's removal of these contrasts, writer Elger Niels called the manuscript version a missed culmination in Rachmaninoff's development. Instead, Rachmaninoff started writing in clearer musical forms, like those in the Third Symphony and Symphonic Dances.

Also, in the Finale, the appearance of the Dies Irae is not a cause of fright or dread. Instead it prominently heads the second subject, which in both musical gesture and Dies Irae-related content greatly resembles the triumphant second subject from the Finale of Rachmaninoff's Second Symphony. While this similarity may not have been intended, a reference to the coda from The Bells at the end of the Finale's exposition may be more deliberate. None of these instances were left in the composer's 1941 edition.

== Selected recordings ==
=== Manuscript version (1926) ===
- Alexander Ghindin, pianist, with the Helsinki Philharmonic Orchestra conducted by Vladimir Ashkenazy, recorded in 2001 (first recording)
- Yevgeny Sudbin, pianist, with the North Carolina Symphony conducted by Grant Llewellyn, recorded in January 2008
- Alain Lefèvre, pianist, with the Montreal Symphony Orchestra conducted by Kent Nagano, recorded in September 2011

=== 1928 version ===
- William Black, pianist, with the Iceland Symphony Orchestra conducted by Igor Buketoff, recorded in 1992 (the first and only recording)

While the Black/Buketoff recording is the only commercial recording of the complete 1928 version, a single movement, the third, has been recorded by pianist Mikhail Rudy and Mariss Jansons conducting the St. Petersburg Philharmonic. Furthermore, there exist two non-commercial recordings of the 1928 version at the International Piano Archives of the University of Maryland: a live performance from May 3, 1973 by pianist Gunnar Johansen with the Louisville Orchestra conducted by Jorge Mester in Indianapolis as part of the Butler University Romantic Music Festival (Johansen had performed the concerto with success in 1934 with Dr. Stock and the Chicago Symphony); as well as a November 12, 1939 recording of a Radio City Music Hall broadcast of the concerto performed by pianist Henrietta Schumann and the Radio City Orchestra conducted by Erno Rapee, apparently the first recording of this work, which even predates Rachmaninoff's own 1941 recording of the final version. The Henrietta Schumann recording comprises five sides of three 78 rpm instantaneous discs which have been transferred to CD format by the International Piano Archives at Maryland which has taken the opportunity to reduce the surface noise and correct the playback pitch, although some portions of the work are missing due to recording with only one disc cutting lathe.

=== 1941 version ===
- Sergei Rachmaninoff, pianist, with the Philadelphia Orchestra conducted by Eugene Ormandy, recorded in 1941.
- Arturo Benedetti Michelangeli, pianist, with the Philharmonia Orchestra conducted by Ettore Gracis, recorded in 1957.
- Earl Wild, pianist, with the Royal Philharmonic Orchestra conducted by Jascha Horenstein, recorded in 1965.
- Agustin Anievas, pianist, with the New Philharmonia Orchestra conducted by Rafael Frühbeck de Burgos, recorded in 1967.
- Vladimir Ashkenazy, pianist, with the London Symphony Orchestra conducted by André Previn, recorded in 1972.
- Vladimir Ashkenazy, pianist, with the Royal Concertgebouw Orchestra conducted by Bernard Haitink, recorded in 1986.
- Mikhail Rudy, pianist, with the St. Petersburg Philharmonic Orchestra conducted by Mariss Jansons, recorded in 1993.
- Jean-Yves Thibaudet, with the Cleveland Orchestra conducted by Vladimir Ashkenazy, recorded in 1996.
- Boris Berezovsky, with Dmitry Liss conducting the Ural Philharmonic Orchestra, recorded in 2006.
- Leif Ove Andsnes, with the London Symphony Orchestra, conducted by Antonio Pappano, recorded 2010.
- Valentina Lisitsa, with the London Symphony Orchestra, conducted by Michael Francis, recorded 2013.
- Daniil Trifonov, pianist, with the Philadelphia Orchestra, conducted by Yannick Nézet-Séguin, recorded 2018.
- Yuja Wang, pianist, with the Los Angeles Philharmonic, conducted by Gustavo Dudamel, recorded in 2023.

== Sources ==
- Bertensson, Sergei and Jay Leyda, with the assistance of Sophia Satina, Sergei Rachmaninoff—A Lifetime in Music (Washington Square, New York: New York University Press, 1956)). ISBN n/a.
- Harrison, Max, Rachmaninoff: Life, Works, Recordings (London and New York: Continuum, 2005). ISBN 0-8264-5344-9.
- Matthew-Walker, Robert, "Arms of Steel, Heart of Gold", International Piano Quarterly, No. 11 (Spring 2000).
- Mattnew-Walker, Robert, Rachmaninoff (London and New York: Omnibus Press, 1980). ISBN 0-89524-208-7.
- Norris, Geoffrey, Rachmaninoff (New York: Schirmer Books, 1993). ISBN 0-02-870685-4.
- Norris, Geoffrey, ed. Stanley Sadie, The New Grove Dictionary of Music and Musicians (London: Macmillan, 1980), 20 vols. ISBN 0-333-23111-2.
- Pigott, Patrick, Rachmaninov Orchestral Works (Seattle: University of Washington Press, 1974).
- Sudbin, Yegeny. Medtner & Rachmaninoff Liner Notes https://www.yevgenysudbin.com/artist.php?view=prog&rid=515
