= Anna Lou Dehavenon =

US american anthropologist

Anna Lou Dehavenon (formerly Kapell; November 24, 1926 – February 28, 2012) was an urban anthropologist.

She was born in Bellingham, Washington as Rebecca Ann Lou Melson, she grew up in Portland, Oregon and had attended Reed College for two years before moving first to Chicago, then to New York, where she lived for 60 years. She originally studied piano; she was a student of Sergei Tarnowsky, the teacher of Vladimir Horowitz. She earned her doctorate degree in anthropology in 1978 from Columbia University, and taught at Mount Sinai School of Medicine and the Albert Einstein College of Medicine. She produced annual studies on hunger for the East Harlem Interfaith Welfare Committee, and founded the Action Research Project on Hunger.

Dehavenon's research influenced a 1979 landmark ruling that affirmed a right to shelter in New York City. She wrote a 1985 report on hunger called The Tyranny of Indifference, which contributed to the litigation in the Yvonne McCain case. She wrote Superordinate behavior in urban homes : a video analysis of request-compliance and food control behavior in two black and two white families living in New York City (1978), The tyranny of indifference and the re-institutionalization of hunger, homelessness and poor health : a study of the causes and conditions of the food emergencies in 1708 households with children in Manhattan, Brooklyn and the Bronx in 1986 (1987), The tyranny of indifference : a study of hunger, homelessness, poor health and family dismemberment in 818 New York City households with children in 1988-89 (1989), Out of sight! Out of mind : or, how New York City and New York State tried to abandon the City's homeless families in 1993 (1993), No room at the inn: Or how New York abandoned homeless families to public places (1994), There's no place like home: anthropological perspectives on housing and homelessness in the United States (1996), and From bad to worse at the Emergency Assistance Unit : how New York City tried to stop sheltering homeless families in 1996 (1996).

In the 1980s and 1990s, she served as an expert witness for the Legal Aid Society and the Coalition for the Homeless. The Community Service Society presented Dehavenon with its highest award in 1990.

Dehavenon died in 2012 in Greenport, Suffolk County, New York. Her obituary was included in The Socialite who Killed a Nazi with Her Bare Hands: And 144 Other Fascinating People who Died this Year, a collection of New York Times obituaries published in 2012.

She was the wife of pianist William Kapell, who died in 1953. The couple had two children. She later married Gaston T. de Havenon.

She undertook a career as an expert on homelessness in New York in part as a result, she said, of her own experience of suddenly becoming a single mother with no income when her first husband (Kapell) died. She helped to publish Kapell's diaries and issue new recordings of his music after his death.
