= McAnn =

McAnn is a surname. Notable people with the surname include:

- Aida McAnn Flemming, CM (1896–1994), wife of Premier of New Brunswick Hugh John Flemming
- Donald Roy McAnn (1911–1942), United States Navy sailor awarded the Navy Cross posthumously
- Eamon Mcann or Eamonn McCann, (born 1943), Irish journalist, author and political activist

== See also ==
- Thom McAn, a brand of shoes
- USS McAnn (DE-179), Cannon-class destroyer escort built for the United States Navy during World War II
- USS McAnn (DE-73), provisional name given to HMS Balfour (K464), a Buckley-class Captain-class frigate during World War II
- MacCunn
- Machan
- McCain (disambiguation)
- McCane
- McCann (disambiguation)
