= Machan =

Machan may refer to:

== People ==
- Machan (surname)
- St Machan (died 1170s), 12th-century Scottish saint
- Machan Varghese (1960–2011), Malayalam film actor

== Film ==
- Machan (2008 film), an Italian-Sri Lankan comedy
- Machan, an unreleased Tamil comedy film by Sakthi Chidambaram

== Other ==
- Machan (state constituency), a state constituency in Sarawak, Malaysia
- Machan, Iran, a village in Sistan and Baluchestan Province, Iran
- An archaic name for the village of Dalserf in Lanarkshire, Scotland
- A hunting blind, or bird hide

== See also ==
- McAnn
