= Sergei Tarnowsky =

Russian, Soviet and American pianist and teacher

Sergei Vladimirovich Tarnowsky (also spelled Sergei Tarnovsky; Russian: Серге́й Владимирович Тарновский; 3 November 1883 – 22 March 1976) was a Russian, Soviet and American pianist and teacher.

== Biography ==
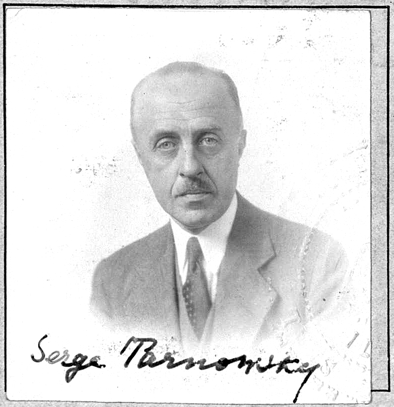
Serge Tarnowsky

Tarnowsky was born in Kharkiv (then the capital of the Kharkov Governorate). Visiting musicians often visited the family home and Sergei showed an interest in the piano at an early age. At the age of eight he studied privately with Henryk Bobiński, a graduate of the Warsaw Conservatory. At age 19 he commenced studies with Anna Yesipova at the St. Petersburg Conservatory. The director of the Conservatory was Alexander Glazunov, whose adopted daughter Tarnowsky later married. On graduation, Tarnowsky received a gold medal and the Anton Rubinstein Prize.

He went to teach at Odesa, where he appeared as soloist under Vasily Safonov. Safonov was so impressed that he arranged for Tarnowsky to appear with the Berlin Philharmonic in a program of three works for piano and orchestra - concertos by Tchaikovsky and Rachmaninoff, and a Fantasy by Arensky. He then toured other European cities.

In Rome, he performed Rachmaninoff's Piano Concerto No. 1, after which he was congratulated by Cosima Wagner, who was in the audience.

In between concert tours, Tarnowsky worked at the Mariinsky Theatre with Albert Coates. He then become piano professor at the Kiev Conservatory, where he taught Vladimir Horowitz and was his only teacher from the years 1914 to 1919 (Horowitz was 11 years old when he first entered Tarnowsky's class and 16 when he left to study with Felix Blumenfeld). His other students at Kiev included Alexander Uninsky, Vladimir Yampolsky and Anatole Kitain. Tarnowsky married Glazunov's adopted daughter Elena in Leningrad on February 18, 1928, and they moved to Paris. They emigrated to the United States in 1930. In 1933, he joined the DePaul University School of Music in Chicago and appeared in concert with artists such as Nathan Milstein, William Primrose, Raya Garbousova and Maria Kurenko. He recorded an album of Tchaikovsky songs with Kurenko.

In 1938, Tarnowsky became a naturalized United States citizen with the help of his colleague at DePaul University School of Music, Richard Czerwonky, who signed as a witness on the paperwork. Tarnowsky later married one of his pupils, Maxine Matlavish, and they settled in California, where from the 1940s until his death he was one of the most sought-after piano teachers. Among the many pianists he taught during his years in Southern California is the Cuban virtuoso Horacio Gutiérrez, who Tarnowsky claimed was the biggest pianistic talent he had encountered since Vladimir Horowitz.

Other students included Rebecca Anna Lou Melson, who subsequently married William Kapell (she is now known as Anna Lou Dehavenon), and Madeleine Stowe, who gave music up to become an actress when Tarnowsky died.
