= McKain =

McKain is a surname. Notable people with the surname include:

- Archie McKain (1911–1985), American baseball player
- Devante McKain (born 1994), English footballer
- Douglas Mary McKain (1789–1873), New Zealand nurse, midwife and businesswoman
- Hal McKain (1906–1970), American baseball player
- Jonathan McKain (born 1982), Australian footballer

== See also ==
- McKane (surename)
- McKean (surename)
- McCain (surename)
