= BCPA Flight 304 =

1953 aviation accident in California, United States

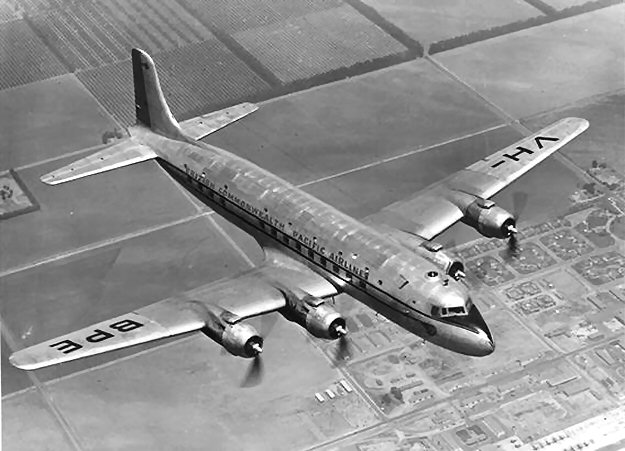
- The ill-fated VH-BPE.

Accident
- Date: 29 October 1953
- Summary: Controlled flight into terrain
- Site: San Mateo County, 3 miles WSW of Woodside, California; 37°24′21″N 122°19′30″W

Aircraft
- Aircraft type: DC-6
- Aircraft name: Resolution
- Operator: British Commonwealth Pacific Airlines
- Registration: VH-BPE
- Flight origin: Sydney, Australia
- 1st stopover: Fiji
- 2nd stopover: Canton Island, Kiribati
- 3rd stopover: Honolulu, Hawaii, United States
- Last stopover: San Francisco, California, United States
- Destination: Vancouver, BC, Canada
- Passengers: 11
- Crew: 8
- Fatalities: 19
- Survivors: 0

BCPA Flight 304/44 was a scheduled flight operated by British Commonwealth Pacific Airlines from Sydney, Australia, to Vancouver, Canada, with scheduled stops at Fiji, Canton Island, Honolulu and San Francisco. On 29 October 1953, the flight was conducted by a Douglas DC-6 named Resolution and registered in Australia as VH-BPE. The propliner crashed during its initial approach towards San Francisco International Airport, killing all 19 people on board, including the American pianist William Kapell.

== History of the flight ==
The aircraft was flying the Honolulu – San Francisco leg with a crew of 8, and 11 passengers (10 adults and 1 child). The estimated flying time was 9 hours and 25 minutes. Captain Bruce N. Dickson (aged 34) and his crew took over the plane in Honolulu as scheduled.

Dickson and his first officer, Frank A. Campbell (aged 28), each had several thousand hours of flight time in the DC-6. Both pilots had made more than 100 approaches into San Francisco Airport, many of which were instrument approaches. On 29 October the weather in the San Francisco area did not present adverse flight conditions, but visual reference with the ground was prevented by the overcast foggy conditions so an instrument approach was required.

As the flight neared the California coast, the crew contacted San Francisco Air Route Traffic Control (ARTC). At 8:07 am Pacific Standard Time, it was cleared to descend in accordance with Visual Flight Rules and to maintain at least 500 feet (150 m) on top of clouds, which the crew acknowledged.

At 8:15 am, the flight reported that it was starting its descent, and at that time was given the San Francisco weather report. Just after 8:21 am, ARTC cleared the flight to the San Francisco instrument landing system (ILS) outer marker beacon via the Half Moon Bay fan marker direct to the San Francisco outer marker, with instructions to maintain at least 500 feet (150 m) above all clouds and to contact San Francisco approach control after passing the Half Moon Bay fan marker.

At 8:39 am, the crew called San Francisco approach control and advised that it was over Half Moon Bay, 500 feet (150 m) on top of clouds. Approximately three minutes later, the crew reported "southeast, turning inbound". At 8:45 am, a call to the flight was unanswered as were all subsequent calls.

Local resident George Bordi heard the plane fly overhead in thick fog, then moments later heard the tremendous "crump" sound of the plane impacting on nearby terrain.

William Kapell, a New York pianist who was returning from a concert tour in Australia, was among the eleven passengers and eight crewmembers who lost their lives. Kapell was the only US citizen on the plane. All the crew and 7 passengers were from Australia. Two passengers were from the United Kingdom, and one from Canada.

== Search and recovery ==
Many hours after the crash, members of search parties, who had difficulty getting through a dense wood at the base of King's Mountain, said they could find no survivors.

Red Cross volunteers and emergency personnel, including what would become the first forensic investigation team in the United States, recovered bodies and wreckage, used dental records to identify remains, and put out three forest fires started by the crash. The Redwood City Armory was used by the sheriff's department as a makeshift morgue. Except for the body of William Kapell, which was quickly transported by family members back to his home state of New York, bodies were cremated at Cypress Lawn Cemetery in Colma, California and returned to their families. Two did remain in the cemetery, passenger Williaam (sic) Cox in a standard plot, while purser Knight's ashes were placed in a niche in the columbarium at Cypress Lawn.

== Investigation ==
Accident Investigation Report: Diagram of the instrument approach procedure and crash site

The Civil Aeronautics Board investigated the accident. The investigation began immediately after the wreckage was located in the mountainous area southwest of San Francisco, about seven and a half miles southeast of the town of Half Moon Bay. The aircraft was almost entirely destroyed by impact and ensuing fire. It had initially struck the top of several large redwood trees, shearing off one of its landing gear and leaving it hung in an oak. It then continued across a narrow ravine and crashed against the side of a steeply rising slope approximately half a mile beyond the first tree strike. The main wreckage area was at about 1,950 feet (590 m) above sea level.

The landing gear was down and locked at the time of impact. There was no evidence of mechanical or structural failure prior to the impact.

The accident site was between the Half Moon Bay Fan Marker and the San Francisco ILS Outer Marker, and it appeared that the flight had not maintained at least 500 feet (150 m) on top of clouds between those points but had descended in weather conditions which precluded reference to the ground.

In addition, the flight had reported being over the Half Moon Bay Fan Marker at 8:39 am and then "Southeast, turning inbound" at about 8:42 am. In this time interval it would not have been possible for the flight at normal speed to have flown from the Half Moon Bay Outer Marker to the ILS Outer Marker, make the required turn and return to the site of the crash in accordance with Civil Aeronautics Authority approved instrument approach procedure. Thus it was likely that when the pilot reported he was "Southeast, turning inbound", he was in fact southwest of the airport.

The investigation then stated it was probable that the captain, after reporting he was over Half Moon Bay, either saw the terrain momentarily through an unreported break in the overcast foggy conditions or because of a radio navigational error became convinced his position was farther northeast and started to descend over what he believed was the proper area.

It was therefore concluded that the probable cause of the crash was the failure of the crew to follow prescribed procedures for an instrument approach.

== Memorials ==
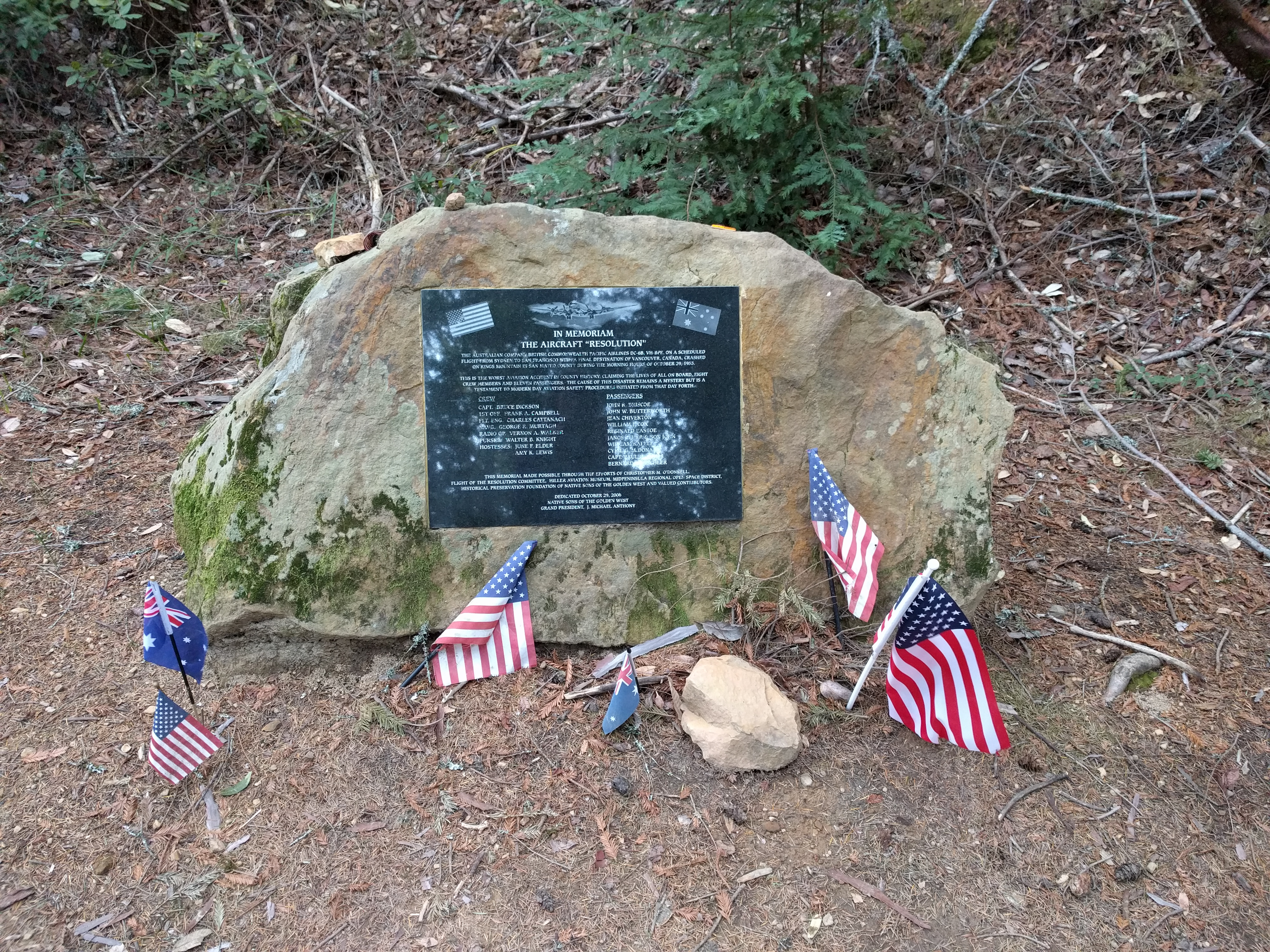
The plaque commemorating the victims of the crash in El Corte de Madera Creek Open Space Preserve.

Today, the crash site is part of the El Corte de Madera Creek Open Space Preserve, which includes the "Resolution Trail", named for the plane. Park rules restrict visitors to the trail and visitors are also requested to respect this historical site by leaving any artifacts where they find them.

Over fifty people attended a plaque's dedication on June 27, 2009, near the junction of the Fir & Vista Point trails, near Vista Point - the site of where a military H-19 'Chickasaw' recovery helicopter landed on the day of the crash.

The latest remembrance day was the 65th. anniversary of the crash, held on October 29, 2018. Visiting the plaque that day was the brother of co-pilot Campbell, Alan Campbell, who had flown in from Cairns, Australia. He placed an Australian flag before the granite memorial and made a somber visit to the impact point.
