= Lev Pouishnoff =

Russian-born British pianist (1891–1959)

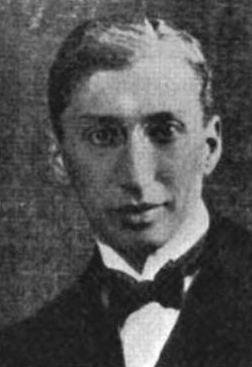
- Born: Lev Nikolayevich Pyshnov; 11 October 1891; Kiev or Odessa, Russian Empire
- Died: 28 May 1959 (aged 67); Hendon, Middlesex, England
- Education: Saint Petersburg Conservatory
- Occupations: Pianist; composer

Lev Nikolaevich Pouishnoff (Russian: Лев Николаевич Пышнов, romanized: Lev Nikolayevich Pyshnov; 11 October [O.S. 29 September] 1891 – 28 May 1959) was a Russian-born pianist and composer, who made his home in the United Kingdom and whose career was largely in the West, from the 1920s onwards. He was especially associated with performances of the works of Frédéric Chopin, though he also played works by Franz Schubert, Robert Schumann, and Franz Liszt. His was among the earliest recordings of Schubert's Sonata in G major, D 894, made for English Columbia around 1928.

== Childhood and early studies ==
Pouishnoff, born into an aristocratic Russian family in either Kiev or Odessa, was drawn to the piano as a young child, and, having acquired some aptitude before the age of ten, gave two public concerts. His parents, not wishing him to be exploited, discouraged this, but after his father's death (when Lev was 9), financial constraints led to his accepting concert engagements, and he rapidly gained a reputation. Special arrangements were made for his schooling, where he had a particular interest in chemistry. At the age of 14 he joined the State Opera Company orchestra, but a chance meeting with Feodor Chaliapin persuaded him to pursue his piano studies.

== Formal study and training ==
He studied at the Saint Petersburg Conservatory under Anna Yesipova (piano), with instruction from Rimsky-Korsakov, Liadov and Glazunov (composition) and Nikolai Tcherepnin (conducting). He was one of the most brilliant students of his time, and emerged in 1910 with a first class diploma, a Gold Medal, and a cash prize equivalent to £120 for a voyage to Europe. In that year he competed for the St Petersburg Rubinstein Prize against Arthur Rubinstein, Alexander Borovsky, Julius Isserlis, Edwin Fischer and Alfred Hoehn (the winner). However, instead of embarking at once on a high-profile recital career, he chose instead to make a musical tour through various European countries, studying their music and meeting their musicians, which greatly broadened his experience.

Returning to Russia, he made a recital tour with the distinguished Hungarian violinist Leopold Auer, and followed this with a solo tour giving piano recitals, which resulted in many offers of engagements in the major European centres. His international reputation was growing when World War I interrupted his progress. Owing to short-sightedness, he was exempt from military service but, being confined to Russia, he played in military camps and gave a series of concerts for wounded and convalescent men in hospitals.

== Career in the West ==
Pouishnoff remained in Russia through the Russian Revolution, suffering considerable want, and in 1919 had the opportunity to make a concert tour in Persia (Iran), the first eminent European pianist to do so. After its successful completion he returned and soon afterwards escaped across the Russian frontier and made his way to Paris. In 1920 he moved on to London, where he was unknown, but gave his first and highly acclaimed recital at the Wigmore Hall on 2 February 1921, where he was greatly admired by Ernest Newman. From this point he made his home in Britain.

His career now burst upon the European scene. He made numerous orchestral appearances in Britain, in London at the Queen's Hall and Royal Albert Hall, with the Hallé Orchestra in Manchester and with the Scottish Orchestra. His many compositions for orchestra, violin and piano were still in MS in 1924, but his piano pieces were by then being published. He began to make regular visits to the principal cities of France, Germany, Belgium and the Netherlands, and was in the United States in the seasons of 1924-25 and 1925-26, when he toured major cities. His career eventually became world-wide.

In summer 1926 he devoted a whole week of recitals to playing over seventy of the principal works of Chopin, and repeated this in 1927 to much acclaim. On 2 December 1928 he gave the first performance in Britain of Rachmaninoff's Piano Concerto No 4 in Manchester, broadcast by the BBC. In recordings he is heard around 1930 as an extremely articulate and intelligent accompanist to Frank Titterton in Schubert song repertoire. He was among the earliest pianists to broadcast from Savoy Hill in 1925, and in 1938 he became the first to be broadcast on television, from Alexandra Palace. During World War II he gave concerts to factory workers, miners and dockers, and made extensive tours among the forces in the Middle East.

Pouishnoff made a substantial number of recordings, especially of Chopin and Liszt. He had a very extensive technique, and a delicacy and sensitivity of nuance which won extremely high praise from some critics.

He ended his own life, in Hendon, Middlesex. His widow, Dorothy (née Hildreth), a former pupil, died only three weeks after him.
