= McKane =

McKane is a surname. Notable people with the surname include:

- Alice Woodby McKane (1865–1948), American physician
- John McKane, British politician
- Kathleen McKane Godfree, English badminton and tennis player

== See also ==
- McKane v. Durston, a United States Supreme Court case
- McKain (surname)
- McKean (surename)
- McCain (surename)
