= Isidor Achron =

Concert pianist, composer, and music teacher (1892–1948)

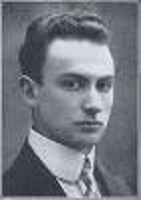
- Born: 24 November 1892; Warsaw, Russian Empire
- Died: 12 May 1948 (aged 55); New York City
- Education: St. Petersburg Conservatory
- Occupations: Pianist; Composer; Music teacher

Isidor Yulyevich Achron (Russian: Изидор Юльевич Ахрон; November 24 [O.S. November 11] 1892 – May 12, 1948) was a Russian-American pianist, composer and music teacher.

== Birth and early childhood ==
Isidor Achron, youngest brother of Joseph Achron, was born on November 11, 1892, in Warsaw to Russian parents of Jewish descent. He was a child prodigy, showing a musical aptitude at any early age. His older brother, Joseph Achron, placed him in the St. Petersburg Conservatory. He first studied piano with Nikolay Dubasov; Anna Essipoff; Anatol Liadov in composition; and Maximilian Steinberg in orchestration. He received his "artist diploma" in 1915.

== Marriage and family ==
He married Lea Karina on June 14, 1935. She was born in Helsinki in 1914. She was a mezzo-soprano who made her singing debut with the Helsingfors Symphony Orchestra in 1931 under the baton of Jean Sibelius.

As her husband, she was an accomplished pianist. She collaborated with him in composing. She was a singer who could perform vocal repertoire in nine different languages. In 1941, she made her New York debut at Town Hall with her husband accompanying her. She went on to have a successful career in radio and television. She served as audio director for the popular television show "Your Hit Parade". Mario Castelnuovo-Tedesco and Nicolas Slonimsky were two composers who dedicated songs to her.

== Early career ==
After three years of service in the Russian army, Achron graduated from the conservatory in 1918 and went on a concert tour of Russia and Germany. He appeared as soloist with a large symphony orchestra in Pavlovsk, near St. Petersburg. In Berlin he gave four concerts in the course of a single season.

Achron first accompanied Jascha Heifetz as a child prodigy in St. Petersburg in 1909, and subsequently toured and recorded with Jascha Heifetz for over ten years. He accompanied Heifetz on twenty-nine (29) of Heifetz' violin solos for Victor Records.

== Emigration to the United States ==
Achron emigrated to the United States in 1922 and became a citizen of that country in 1928. On March 21, 1923, he received a telegram from Jascha Heifetz offering him a position as accompanist for tour beginning May 1, 1923 terminating May 1, 1924 including tour of the orient. On New Year's Eve 1923, he played in Carnegie Hall as an accompaniment for Jascha Heifetz annual solo violin performance.

For the next ten years, he served as Heifetz's principal accompanist, recording an extensive discography and performing chamber and solo recitals in major music centers all over the world.

== Later career ==
In 1933, he ended his association with Jascha Heifetz and on November 10, 1933, he appeared at Carnegie Hall as solo pianist. His program encompassed three Bach transcriptions: that of the chaconne by Busoni, the prelude and fugue in A minor by Liszt and the overture from Cantata No. 28 by Saint-Saëns, Haydn's andante with variations, a Chopin group and a concluding section by Borodin, Scriabin and Liszt.

In 1936, he appeared in recital at the Town Hall, New York. His program included Bach-Liszt's Prelude and Fugue in A minor, two preludes and fugues from Bach's "Well-Tempered Clavichord" Beethoven's Sonata, Op. 2, No. 1; a nocturne, two mazurkas and a ballade by Chopin, and a concluding group by Shostakovich, Debussy, Ravel and Liszt. He performed his original works with the New York Philharmonic at Town Hall in December 1937, with Sir John Barbirolli (1899-1979) conducting. On January 17, 1938, he gave a solo performance at Town Hall, and in July 1939 his piano concerto was performed at the City Amateur Symphony Orchestra by Edwin Lunt (then 15 years old). Achron conducted the orchestra.

On January 20, 1940, he and his wife performed at Carnegie Hall for the fourth annual music festival for the Trade Union Division of Jewish Workers and Pioneers in Palestine. On January 16, 1943, he appeared at Town Hall in a joint recital with his wife, mezzo-soprano, Lea Karina. Paul Ulanowsky played accompaniment for Ms. Karina. Again on November 17, 1944, he appeared in a joint recital with his wife at Town Hall. On November 20, 1946, he performed solo at Carnegie Hall. Playing his Sonnet #3 for the first time publicly. It was his last performance in New York.

Amidst all these performances, Achron remained active as a composer, writing the song "Do You Know that The Moon Can Talk" under a pseudonym, John Dorr. It was published in 1937 by Chappell & Co., Ltd. In 1941 he composed two compositions for violin: Sonet #2, introduced by Jascha Heifetz and "Valse Dramatique" performed by Mischa Elman.

== Death ==
Isidor Achron died on May 12, 1948, in his home from complications of a heart attack that he had suffered two weeks prior. He was 55 years old.

== Selected compositions ==
- Balerina-valse
- Concertos, piano, orchestra, no. 1, op. 2, (1937)
- Concertos, piano, orchestra, no. 2, op. 3, A major (1942)
- Gavotte-satirique, op. for cello and piano
- Happy Birthday FDR, music by Isidor Achron; words by Friede Rothe.
- Improvisation, violin with piano accompaniment, Isidor Achron. -- New York : Carl Fischer, 1946.
- Improvisation, violin and piano, op. 12
- Nocturne-fantasia for violin and piano, op. 9
- Nocturne-fantasia for cello and piano, op. 9, arr.
- Sonata for piano, op. 14
- Sonnets, violin, piano, no. 1, op. 5
- Sonnets, for violin and piano, no. 2, op. 6
