= Emil Frey (composer) =

Swiss composer, pianist and teacher (1889–1946)

Emil Frey (8 April 1889 – 20 May 1946) was a Swiss composer, pianist and teacher.

== Biography ==
He was born in Baden, near Zurich, Switzerland in 1889. He studied with Otto Barblan, Willy Rehberg and Joseph Lauber at the Geneva Conservatory 1902–1905, then at the Conservatoire de Paris with Louis Diémer (piano) and Gabriel Fauré and Charles-Marie Widor (composition). In 1906 he won the Premier prix de piano.

He became a court pianist in Bucharest after 1907. In 1908 he and Xaver Scharwenka gave a private performance on two pianos of Scharwenka's Piano Concerto No. 4 in F minor to its dedicatee Queen Elisabeth of Romania. The next day it was performed publicly with orchestra; the composer conducted and Frey was the soloist.

George Enescu dedicated his Piano Sonata No. 1 in F-sharp minor, Op. 24/1 to Emil Frey.

In 1910 Frey entered the composition section of the Anton Rubinstein Competition in St Petersburg, and won with his Piano Trio. This led to an engagement as Professor of the Virtuoso Class at the Moscow Conservatory 1912–1917.

Back in Switzerland after the Russian Revolution, he taught at the Zürcher Hochschule der Künste until his death, directing the piano finishing class there from 1922. His students included Victor Fenigstein, Peter Mieg and Adrian Aeschbacher. Rudolf Am Bach studied with him privately. He also concertised in Berlin, and toured throughout Europe and South America. He was considered among the leading Swiss pianists, his playing being noted for its extreme delicacy of feeling combined with brilliance of execution. He often played piano duos with his brother Walter Frey.

He died in Zurich on 20 May 1946, aged 57.

== Compositions ==
Emile Frey was a prolific composer, whose opus numbers reached 102. He was influenced to some degree by Alexander Scriabin, whom he knew, by Sergei Prokofiev and by Ferruccio Busoni. His music includes:

- 2 symphonies (the first has a choral finale)
- Swiss Festival Overture
- piano, violin and cello concertos
- choral works to sacred texts
- chamber music (Piano Quintet, String Quartet, Piano Trio, Violin Sonata, Cello Sonata)
- piano music (sonatas, suites, sets of variations, and an instruction manual published in German and French)
- organ music
- other pieces

He also transcribed some works of Johann Sebastian Bach for piano.
