= William Kapell =

American classical pianist (1922–1953)

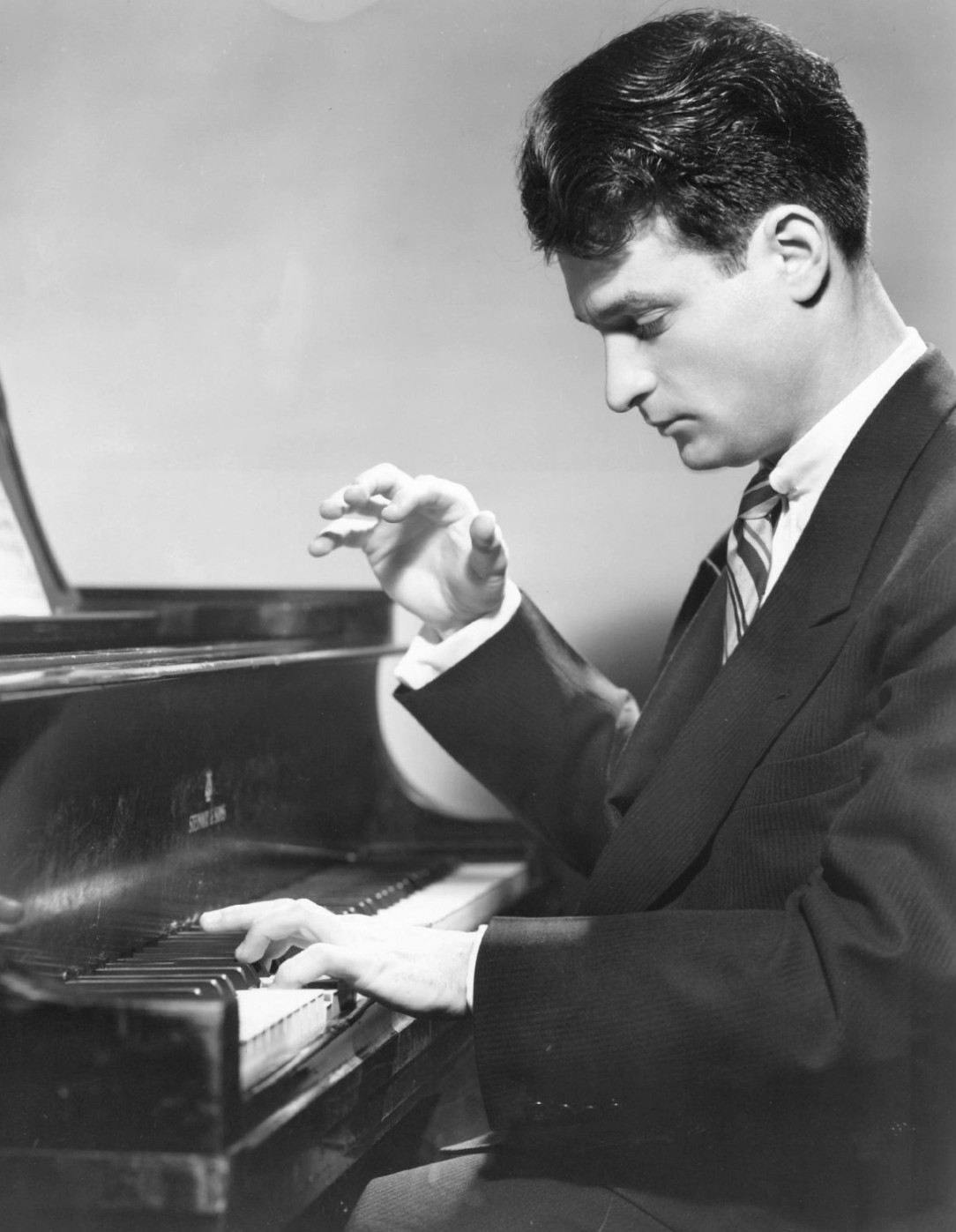
- Kapell in 1948
- Born: Oscar William Kapell; September 20, 1922; New York City, U.S.
- Died: October 29, 1953 (aged 31); Kings Mountain, California, U.S.
- Occupation: Pianist
- Years active: 1937–1953
- Spouse: Rebecca Ann Lou Melson (m. 1948)
- Children: 2

Oscar William Kapell (September 20, 1922 – October 29, 1953) was an American classical pianist. The Washington Post described him as "America's first great pianist", while The New York Times described him as "one of the last century's great geniuses of the keyboard" and Times critic and pianist Michael Kimmelman, writing in The New York Review of Books, remarked: "Was there any greater American pianist born during the last century than Kapell? Perhaps not." In 1953, at age 31, Kapell died in the crash of BCPA Flight 304 while returning from a concert tour in Australia.

== Biography ==
William Kapell was born in New York City on September 20, 1922, and grew up in the eastside neighborhood of Yorkville, Manhattan, where his parents owned a Lexington Avenue bookstore. His father was of Spanish-Russian Jewish ancestry and his mother of Polish descent. Dorothea Anderson La Follette (the wife of Chester La Follette) met Kapell at the Third Street Music School and became his teacher, giving him lessons several times a week at her studio on West 64th Street. Kapell later studied with Olga Samaroff, former wife of conductor Leopold Stokowski, at the Juilliard School.

Kapell won his first competition at the age of ten and received as a prize a turkey dinner with the pianist José Iturbi. In 1941, he won the Philadelphia Orchestra's youth competition as well as the Naumburg Award. The following year, the Walter W. Naumburg Foundation sponsored the 19-year-old pianist's New York début, a recital which won him the Town Hall Award for the year's outstanding concert by a musician under 30. He was signed to an exclusive recording contract with RCA Victor.

Kapell achieved fame while in his early twenties, in part as a result of his performances of Aram Khachaturian's Piano Concerto in D-flat. His 1946 world premiere recording of the piece with Serge Koussevitzky and the Boston Symphony Orchestra was a sell-out hit. Eventually, he became so associated with the work that he was referred to in some circles as "Khachaturian Kapell." Besides his pianism and technical gifts, Kapell's attractive appearance and mop of black hair helped make him a favorite with the public.

By the late 1940s, Kapell had toured the United States, Canada, Europe and Australia to acclaim and praised as the most brilliant and audacious of his generation of young American pianists. On May 18, 1948, he married Rebecca Anna Lou Melson, with whom he had two children. She was a pianist herself, having been a student of Sergei Tarnowsky, the teacher of Vladimir Horowitz.

Early on, there was a tendency to typecast Kapell as a performer of technically difficult repertoire. While his technique was exceptional, he was a versatile musician, and was impatient with what he considered shallow or sloppy music making. His own repertoire was diverse, encompassing works from J. S. Bach to Aaron Copland, who so admired Kapell's performances of his Piano Sonata that he was writing a new work for him at the time of the pianist's death. Kapell practiced up to eight hours a day, keeping track of his sessions with a notebook and clock. He also set aside time from his busy concert schedule to work with the musicians he most admired, including Artur Schnabel, Pablo Casals, and Rudolf Serkin. Kapell also approached Arthur Rubinstein and Vladimir Horowitz (whose East 94th Street townhouse was diagonally across the street from the Kapells' apartment) for lessons, but they demurred. Horowitz later commented that there was nothing he could have taught Kapell.

== Health, death and aftermath ==
Kapell suffered from asthma and rheumatic fever during his life. In 1952, Kapell reportedly suffered from a serious lung condition. He was diagnosed with bronchitis in April and a doctor advised him to stop playing. In August, he wrote in his diary to tend to a "lung condition – immediately". Three months prior, in May, he allegedly told Anthony Harris, a pianist from Sacramento who he had dinner with, that he was suffering from cancer and that the doctors had given him two years to live.

From August to October 1953, Kapell toured Australia, playing 37 concerts in 14 weeks. He appeared in Sydney, Brisbane, Melbourne, Bendigo, Shepparton, Albury, Horsham and finally in Geelong. Kapell played the final concert of his Australian tour in Geelong, Victoria, on October 22, 1953, a recital which included a performance of Chopin's "Funeral March" Sonata. Days after the concert, he set off on his return flight to the United States, telling reporters at Mascot Airport he would never return to Australia because of the harsh comments from some Australian critics. He was aboard BCPA Flight 304 when on the morning of October 29, 1953, the plane, descending to land in fog, struck the treetops and crashed on Kings Mountain, south of the San Francisco airport. Everyone on board died. His friend, broadcaster Alistair Cooke, covered Kapell's death in his Letter from America on October 30, 1953. On November 2, Kapell's funeral took place at the Stephen Wise Free Synagogue in New York; interment followed at the Mount Ararat Cemetery near Farmingdale, New York.

Musician Isaac Stern set up the William Kapell Memorial Fund to bring musicians to the United States for wider experience. The Australian violinist Ernest Llewellyn, a friend of Stern's, was the inaugural recipient in 1955.

Pianists including Eugene Istomin, Gary Graffman, Leon Fleisher and Van Cliburn have acknowledged Kapell's influence. Fleisher stated that Kapell was "the greatest pianistic talent that this country has ever produced". Kapell's widow, Anna Lou Dehavenon (1926–2012), undertook a career as an expert on homelessness in New York in part as a result, she said, of her own experience of suddenly becoming a single mother with no income. For the rest of her life she worked to keep her late husband's recordings before the public.

Kapell's estate sued BCPA, Qantas (which had taken over BCPA in 1954), and BOAC (which was alleged to have sold Kapell the ticket). In 1964, more than ten years after the crash, Kapell's widow and two children were awarded US$924,396 in damages. The award was overturned on appeal in 1965.

== Kapell International Piano Competition and Festival ==
In 1986, the University of Maryland's piano competition was renamed the William Kapell International Piano Competition in Kapell's honor. It became quadrennial in 1998 and was held at the university's Clarice Smith Performing Arts Center. It was discontinued in 2013.

== Recordings ==
In 1944, Kapell signed an exclusive recording contract with RCA Victor. Many of his recordings were originally issued as 78RPM records. Some were issued on LP, but by 1960, all of Kapell's commercial recordings were out of print. In 1962, RCA Victor reissued the Kapell/Koussevitzky recording of the Khachaturian Piano Concerto. Beethoven's Piano Concerto No. 2 and Prokofiev's Piano Concerto No. 3 were reissued on the RCA Victrola label in 1970. For decades, pirated copies of the Kapell's commercial RCA Victor recordings and unlicensed recordings of "live" performances circulated among collectors.

In the 1980s, RCA Victor issued two compact discs of Kapell's recordings, including the Khatchaturian and Prokofiev Third Piano Concertos, and an all-Chopin disc.

A 9 CD set released by RCA Victor in 1998 contains Kapell's complete authorized recordings, including renditions of Chopin's mazurkas and sonatas as well as concertos by Rachmaninoff, Prokofiev, and Khatchaturian. It also has many lesser-known items, some of them first releases, including Shostakovich preludes, Scarlatti sonatas, and the Copland Piano Sonata. The set sold well throughout the world and brought Kapell's work to a new audience.

VAI 1027 contains broadcast recordings of the Rachmaninoff Piano Concerto No. 3 and the Khatchaturian Piano Concerto. Arbiter 108 features part of the Beethoven Piano Concerto No. 3 and the Shostakovich Concerto No. 1, and it includes Mussorgsky's Pictures at an Exhibition, which also appears in the RCA Victor set, as well as on VAI 1048, the last from an Australian recital of July 21, 1953.

In 2004, a number of broadcast recordings made during William Kapell's last Australian tour were returned to his family. RCA Victor issued these recordings in 2008 under the title Kapell Rediscovered. Included are several previously unknown performances of "God Save the Queen", Debussy's Suite bergamasque, Chopin's Barcarolle, Op. 60, and Scherzo No. 1 in B minor, Op. 20, and Prokofiev's Sonata No. 7, Op. 83. In 2013, RCA issued a new 11 CD set of Kapell's complete recordings, including the broadcast recordings from the final Australian tour.
