= Piano Concerto No. 1 (Rachmaninoff) =

Piano concerto by Sergei Rachmaninoff

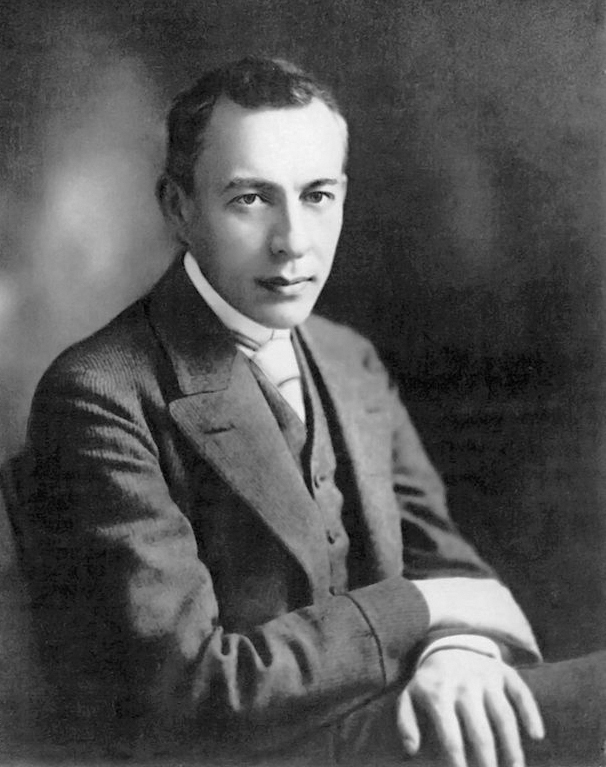
Sergei Rachmaninoff ca. 1900

Sergei Rachmaninoff composed his Piano Concerto No. 1 in F♯ minor, Op. 1, in 1891, at age 17–18 (the first two movements were completed while he was still 17; the third movement and the orchestration were completed shortly after he had turned 18). He dedicated the work to Alexander Siloti. He revised the work thoroughly in 1917.

== Instrumentation ==
- 2 flutes
- 2 oboes
- 2 clarinets
- 2 bassoons
- 4 french horns
- 2 trumpets
- 3 trombones
- Timpani
- Percussions (Triangle and Cymbals)
- String section
- Solo piano

== Structure ==
I. Vivace – Moderato

II. Andante

III. Allegro vivace
Robert Feist conducting the University of Washington Symphony Orchestra, pianist: Neal O'Doan

External audio
- Performed by Vladimir Ashkenazy with the London Symphony Orchestra under André Previn
- I. Vivace – Moderato
- II. Andante
- III. Allegro vivace

The work is in three movements:

1. Vivace – Moderato (F♯ minor)
2. Andante (D major) [1917 version: andante]
3. Allegro vivace (F♯ minor → F♯ major)

=== I. Vivace – Moderato ===
This contrast with the later works can be heard from the opening bars of the first movement, where a brass fanfare precedes a flourish of double octaves and chords on the piano – a musical gesture similar to the Schumann and Grieg piano concertos. This flourish occurs later in the movement, as well, an important factor in the symmetry of the movement. The main theme (like the other themes in this work common to both versions) is short by Rachmaninoff's standards but already shows the sequential devices and arch-like design inherent in his later works.

=== II. Andante ===
The reflective second movement, a nocturne, is only 74 bars long. The texture is less cumbersome in the revised version; the harmonies remain the same but are enlivened by occasional chromatic notes.

=== III. Allegro vivace ===
For the final movement, Rachmaninoff replaced an initially drab opening with a fortissimo passage alternating between time signatures of 9/8 and 12/8. This movement is in sonata rondo form, in which the development is a lengthy section in E♭ major. A maestoso reemergence of the concerto's main theme was eliminated. In the original version he had attempted to use this theme in an upward sequential treatment similar to what he would do later in the Second and Third Concertos. The problem here was that the theme did not lend itself so easily to this treatment, thus sounding contrived. It also came too late in the movement to have the right expansive effort prevalent in the other concertos.

== Overview ==
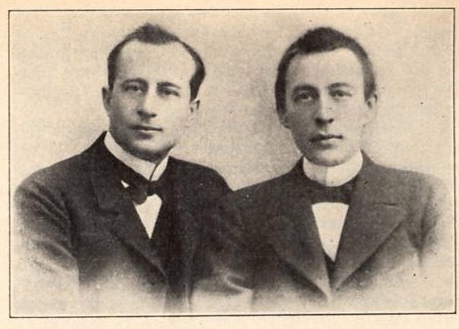
Alexander Siloti with Rachmaninoff.

=== First version ===
This was actually Rachmaninoff's second attempt at a piano concerto. In 1889 he had begun but abandoned a concerto in C minor (the same key, incidentally, in which he would later write his Second Piano Concerto). He wrote Natalya Skalon on 26 March 1891, "I am now composing a piano concerto. Two movements are already written; the last movement is not written, but is composed; I shall probably finish the whole concerto by the summer, and then in the summer orchestrate it." He finished composing and scoring the piece on 6 July and was satisfied with what he had written. The first movement was premiered on 17 March 1892 at the Moscow Conservatory, with the composer as soloist and Vasily Safonov conducting. This may have been the only time the composer played the concerto in its original form, although Siloti, to whom it is dedicated, programmed it to play himself on several occasions.

Composition students were usually advised to base their efforts on a specific model for their first exercises in new forms. In Rachmaninoff's case this was the Grieg Piano Concerto, which was a favourite work of his and one with which he had been familiar from Siloti practicing it at the Rachmaninoff household during the spring and summer of 1890 for future concerts. Rachmaninoff adapted the entire musical structure of the outer movements to the Grieg concerto, literally building his music into it. With all his other concertos, Rachmaninoff would prove more enterprising.

=== Revision and current structure ===
The public was already familiar with the Second and Third Concertos before Rachmaninoff revised the First in 1917. The First is very different from his later works; in exchange for less memorable melodies, this concerto incorporates elements of youthful vivacity and impetuosity.

The differences between the 1890–1891 original and the 1917 revision reveal a tremendous amount about the composer's development in the intervening years. There is a considerable thinning of texture in the orchestral and piano parts and much material that made the original version diffuse and episodic is removed.

Of all the revisions Rachmaninoff made to various works, this one was perhaps the most successful. Using an acquired knowledge of harmony, orchestration, piano technique and musical form, he transformed the early composition into a concise, spirited work. Nevertheless, he was perturbed that the revised work did not become popular with the public. He said to Alfred Swan, "I have rewritten my First Concerto; it is really good now. All the youthful freshness is there, and yet it plays itself so much more easily. And nobody pays any attention. When I tell them in America that I will play the First Concerto, they do not protest, but I can see by their faces that they would prefer the Second or Third."

== Selected recordings ==
=== Manuscript version ===
- Alexander Ghindin, pianist, with Vladimir Ashkenazy conducting the Helsinki Philharmonic Orchestra, recorded in 2001 (first recording)

=== 1917 version ===
- Sergei Rachmaninoff, pianist, with Eugene Ormandy conducting the Philadelphia Orchestra, recorded in 1941.
- Byron Janis, pianist, with Fritz Reiner conducting the Chicago Symphony Orchestra, recorded in 1957.
- Philippe Entremont, pianist, with Eugene Ormandy conducting the Philadelphia Orchestra, recorded in 1958.
- Sviatoslav Richter, pianist, with Kurt Sanderling conducting the Leningrad Philharmonic Orchestra, recorded in 1959.
- Byron Janis, pianist, with Kirill Kondrashin conducting the Moscow Symphony Orchestra, recorded in 1962.
- Earl Wild, pianist, with Jascha Horenstein conducting the Royal Philharmonic Orchestra, recorded in 1965.
- Vladimir Ashkenazy, pianist, with André Previn conducting the London Symphony Orchestra, recorded in 1970.
- Tamás Vásáry, pianist, with Yuri Ahronovitch conducting the London Symphony Orchestra, recorded in 1975.
- Peter Rösel, pianist, with Kurt Sanderling conducting the Berliner Sinfonie-Orchester, recorded in 1982.
- Zoltán Kocsis, pianist, with Edo de Waart conducting the San Francisco Symphony, recorded in 1983.
- Vladimir Ashkenazy, with Bernard Haitink conducting the Concertgebouw Orchestra, recorded in 1986.
- Mikhail Rudy, with Mariss Jansons conducting the Saint Petersburg Philharmonic Orchestra, recorded in 1993.
- Krystian Zimerman, pianist, with Seiji Ozawa conducting the Boston Symphony Orchestra, recorded in 1997.
- Nikolai Lugansky, pianist, with Sakari Oramo and the City of Birmingham Symphony Orchestra, recorded in 2003.
- Stephen Hough, pianist, with Andrew Litton conducting the Dallas Symphony Orchestra, recorded in 2004.
- Leif Ove Andsnes, pianist, with Antonio Pappano conducting the Berlin Philharmonic, recorded in 2005.
- Boris Berezovsky, pianist, with Dmitry Liss conducting the Ural Philharmonic Orchestra, recorded in 2006.
- Simon Trpčeski, pianist, with Vasily Petrenko conducting the Royal Liverpool Philharmonic, recorded in 2010.
- Yuja Wang, pianist, with Gustavo Dudamel conducting the Los Angeles Philharmonic, recorded in 2023.
