= Anna Yesipova =

Russian pianist (1851–1914)

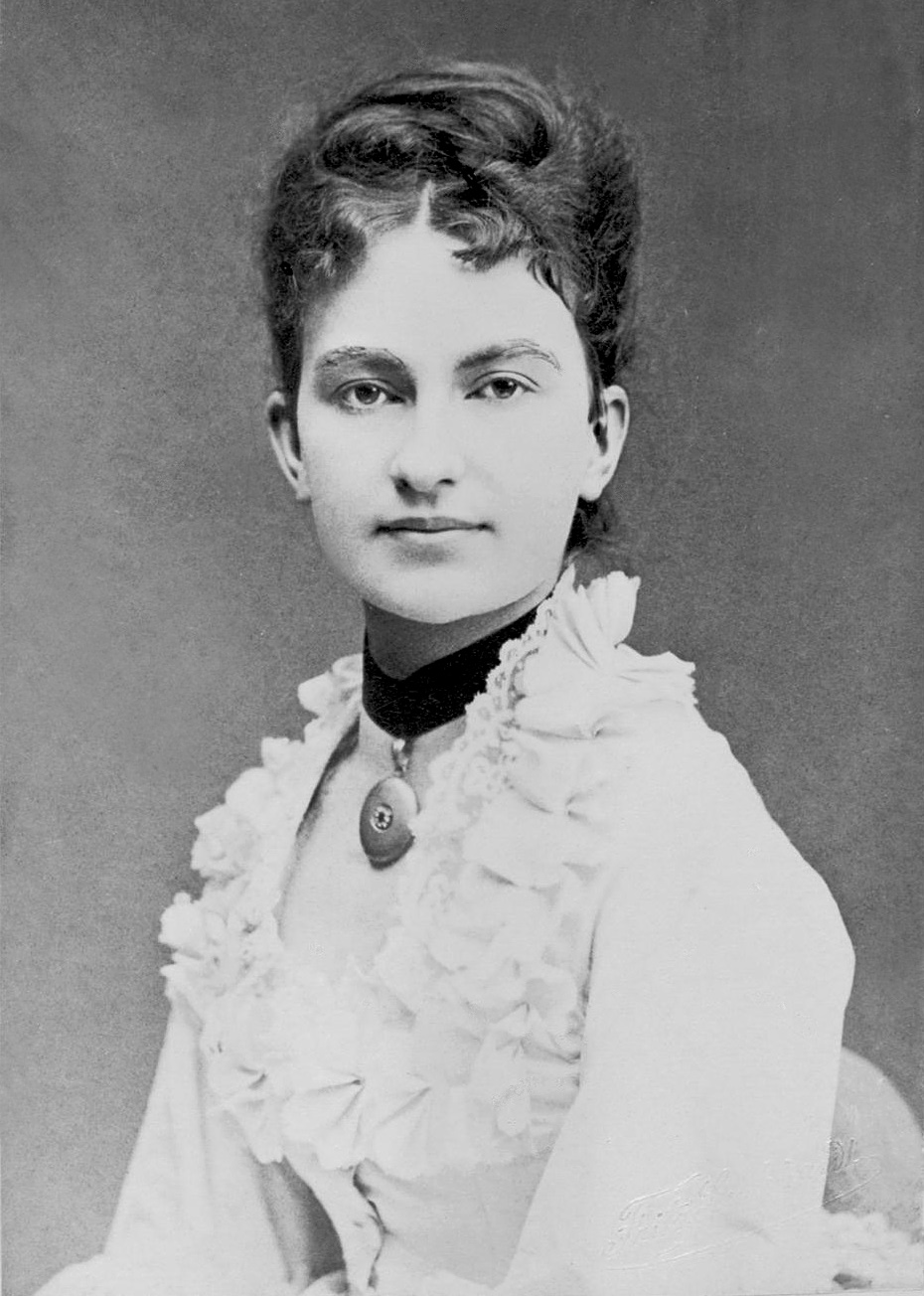

Background information
- Born: February 12, 1851; Saint Petersburg, Russia
- Died: August 18, 1914 (aged 63) Saint Petersburg, Russia
- Occupations: Musician; professor
- Instrument: Piano
- Years active: 1874–1914

Anna Yesipova (Note: Her name is cited variously as Anna Esipova; Anna or Annette Essipova; Anna, Annette or Annetta Essipoff; Annette von Essipow; Anna Jessipowa.) (born Anna Nikolayevna Yesipova; Russian: Анна Николаевна Есипова; 12 February [O.S. 31 January] 1851 – 18 August [O.S. 5 August] 1914) was a Russian pianist.

== Life ==
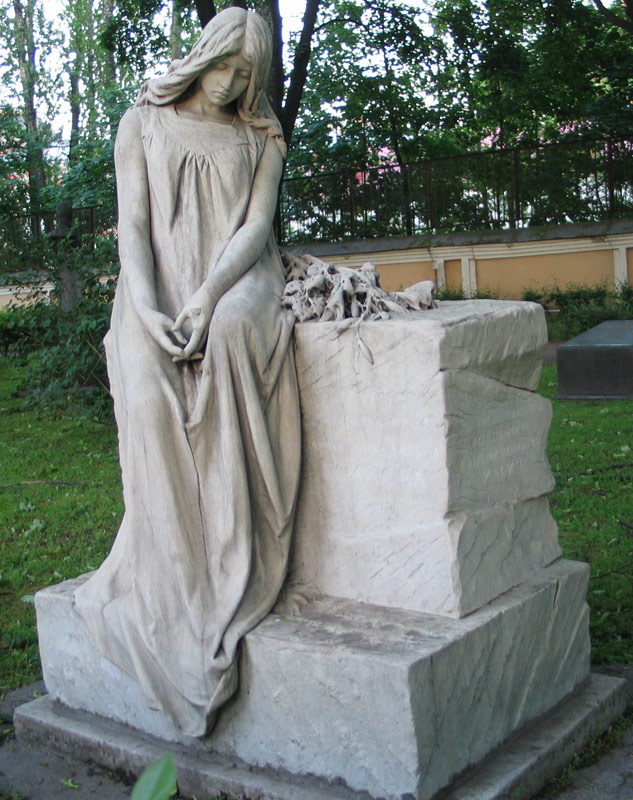
Yesipova's grave in the cemetery of Alexander Nevsky Lavra

Yesipova was one of Teodor Leszetycki's most brilliant pupils. She made her debut in Saint Petersburg in 1874 attracting rave reviews and the artistic admiration of both Pyotr Ilyich Tchaikovsky and Franz Liszt, particularly for her effortless virtuosity and singing tone. She then began concert tours which brought her in 1876 to the United States, where her playing was greatly admired.

Yesipova was probably the first pianist to program the complete set of Frédéric Chopin's Preludes, Op. 28 in a recital, for a concert in 1876. Previously the practice was to perform excerpts only.

In 1877, she heard the playing of Fanny Bloomfield and advised her to train under Leszetycki, whom Yesipova went on to marry in 1880, becoming his second wife, and (after they had two children, a daughter, Theresa, who became a well-known singer and teacher, and a son Robert) divorced in 1892. In the Summer of 1880 she gave a number of concerts in London (Covent Garden) and Lisbon, where she had a very warm reception.

In 1885, Yesipova was appointed Royal Prussian Court Pianist. From 1893 to 1908, she was professor of pianoforte at the Saint Petersburg Conservatory. Among her students were Sergei Prokofiev, Leff Pouishnoff, Sergei Tarnowsky, Maria Yudina, Leonid Kreutzer, Isabelle Vengerova, Anastasia Virsaladze, Leo Ornstein, Isidor Achron, Thomas de Hartmann, and Alexander Borovsky (Borowsky). See: List of music students by teacher: T to Z#Anna Yesipova.

== Recordings ==
In the early 1900s, Yesipova made a number of piano rolls, some of which have made been available as modern recordings (including Thalberg's Fantasia on a theme from Bellini's La Sonnambula).

There is one extant acoustic recording of her playing Benjamin Godard's Gavotte in G, recorded on an Edison cylinder by Julius Block in November 1898. This is one of a series of c. 200 cylinders recorded by Block in Russia in the 1890s and believed to be lost, until they were relocated at Pushkin House in Saint Petersburg and published for the first time in 2008.

== Sources ==
- "Есипова, Анна Николаевна" . Brockhaus and Efron Encyclopedic Dictionary (in Russian). 1906.
- Comtesse Angèle Potocka: Theodore Leschetizky, an intimate study of the man and the musician. New York, The Century co., 1903 p. 223 f.
