= McCain =

McCain may refer to:

- McCain (surname), a surname (includes a list of persons and characters)

== Companies ==
- McCain Foods Limited, a Canadian producer of frozen foods
- McCain Institute, Washington, D.C.–based think tank

== Places ==
- McCain Bluff, in the Usarp Mountains of Antarctica
- McCain Furniture Store, historic building in downtown Columbia, Missouri, United States
- McCain Mall, enclosed shopping mall in North Little Rock, Arkansas, United States
- McCain Stadium, former sports stadium in Scarborough, England, United Kingdom

== Other uses ==
- USS John S. McCain, two ships of the United States Navy

== See also ==
- Cain, one of the sons of Adam and Eve
- Caine (disambiguation)
- McAnn, a surname
