= Nikolay Dubasov =

Russian pianist (1869–1935)

- Born: Nikolay Aleksandrovich Dubasov; 28 September 1869; Saint Petersburg, Russian Empire
- Died: 4 April 1935 (aged 65); Leningrad, Russian SFSR, Soviet Union
- Occupations: Pianist, music educator
- Awards: Honoured Worker of the Arts Industry of the RSFSR

Nikolay Aleksandrovich Dubasov (Russian: Николай Александрович Дубасов; 28 September 1869 – 4 April 1935) was a Russian pianist and music teacher.

He was the winner of the First International Anton Rubinstein Competition in 1890, defeating Ferruccio Busoni, among others. He sustained a hand injury that ended his performing career, and joined the teaching faculty at Saint Peterburg Conservatory in 1893. Among his students were Isidor Achron. He died in 1935, at the age of 65.
