= Machan (surname) =

Machan, Machaň, or Macháň (Czech and Slovak feminine: Machaňová or Macháňová) is a surname. Notable people with the surname include:

- Josef Machaň (1906–1979), Czech athlete
- Josef Machan (sport shooter) (born 1957), Czech sports shooter
- Matt Machan (born 1991), English cricketer
- Róbert Machán (born 1948), Hungarian tennis player
- Tibor Machan (1939–2016), Hungarian-American philosopher
- Tom Machan (born 1940s), Canadian football player
- Richard Morton Machan (1965–1941), historic Australian see Machans Beach, Queensland
