= Anatole Kitain =

Russian classical pianist (1903–1980)

- Born: 17 September 1903; Saint Petersburg, Russia
- Died: 30 July 1980 (aged 76) Orange, New Jersey, U.S.
- Genres: Classical
- Occupation: Pianist
- Instrument: Piano

Anatole Kitain (Russian: Анатолий Китаин; 17 September 1903 – 30 July 1980) was a Russian classical pianist.

== Early life ==
Anatole Kitain was born in Saint Petersburg into a family of professional musicians. His brothers, Robert and Boris, were violinists, and his brother Alexander was a pianist. He showed early promise, performing his own nocturne for the astonished Glazunov at the age of six. He began his studies in the Petersburg Conservatoire, but the political instability of the time led his family to move to Kiev, where he studied in the conservatoire with Sergei Tarnowsky. (Other pianists studying at the Kiev Conservatory at that time included Vladimir Horowitz, Alexander Uninsky and Alexander Brailowsky). In time, Kitain became the private pupil of Felix Blumenfeld, whose few private pupils also included Simon Barere and Horowitz.

== Flight ==
Fleeing Russia in 1923 with his family, Kitain was a prize winner in the first Franz Liszt Competition in Budapest (the competition was won by Annie Fischer). Kitain settled in France, but the outbreak of the second world war prompted him to move to the United States. However, success eluded him there. In 1944, he changed his name to Alexander Karinoff but reverted to his original name two years later. Despite a certain amount of critical success, he remained overshadowed by the ubiquitous figure of his former classmate, Horowitz.

== Recordings ==
He made several LP recordings in the US, one with his brother Robert, and gave his last concert on 22 October 1963. He died at Orange, New Jersey in 1980.

Of his European recordings, only those made for Columbia survive.

== Reception ==
Reviewing the album "Anatole Kitain - The Complete Columbia Recordings 1936-39", Classic CD magazine wrote: "On the evidence of these 26 titles, lovingly remastered in almost uniformly remarkable sound, here is one of the major pianists of the century... I would definitely put this important release into my Top Fifty All-time Great Piano recordings without a doubt."

== Sources ==
Biographical details of Kitain are scarce, and this entry is based on Bryan Crimp's biographical essay in the APR Complete Columbia Recordings, APR 7029, and on a brief autobiography written in 1940 (see External Links)
