= Piano Sonata No. 1 (Enescu) =

1924 piano sonata by George Enescu

- by George Enescu
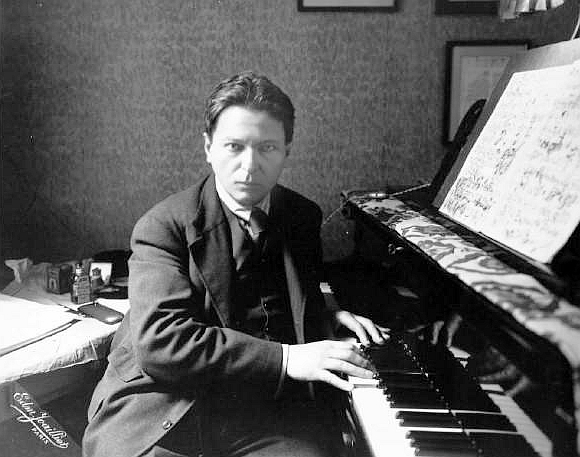
- George Enesco in 1930
- Key: F♯ minor
- Opus: 24, No. 1
- Composed: 1924
- Dedication: Emil Frey
- Performed: November 1925, Mic Theatre, Bucharest
- Movements: 3

The Sonata No. 1 for Piano in F♯ minor, Op. 24, No. 1, is a piano sonata by the Romanian composer George Enescu, completed in 1924.

== History ==
On 18 July 1912 Enescu completed an Allegro movement for a piano sonata in F♯ minor, which he played to Herbert Peyser later that summer in connection with an interview. In a heavily reworked form, this would become the first movement of the Sonata, Op. 24, No. 1. However, Enescu set aside this project for twelve years, resuming work again only in 1924. The early version of this movement was only rediscovered in 1993, by the musicologist Clemansa Liliana Firca.

Enescu took up the sonata again in July 1924 in Tețcani, completely rewriting the first movement and adding the other two, completing the work in Sinaia on 27 August 1924. The score was written for and is dedicated to the Swiss pianist Emil Frey, who had been court pianist in Bucharest from 1907 until the outbreak of World War I.

In an interview given shortly after completing the score, Enescu admitted,

It may seem bizarre that I should interrupt work on my opera Œdipe in order to write a piano sonata. The artist has moments when he is forced to follow his heart's impulse, so I did not find it a contradiction. The Sonata is dedicated to the Swiss maestro Frey, to whom I had promised it 18 years ago. It was time I wrote it!

The first performance was given in November 1925 by the composer himself, in a concert that was part of a festival dedicated to his chamber-music works, organized by the Society of Romanian Composers at the Mic Theatre in Bucharest. He also performed the work in Paris for the first time in April 1926, as part of a concert given by the Société Nationale de Musique.

== Analysis ==
The Sonata is in three movements, whose moderate–fast–slow pattern resembles that of Enescu's Third Symphony.

1. Allegro molto moderato e grave
2. Presto vivace
3. Andante molto espressivo

The first movement is in an extremely free sonata form (though the composer himself declined to characterize it this way). There are two major deviations from the usual sonata design. First, the development begins in the home key of F♯ minor, while the recapitulation begins in the most distant possible key of C minor, a tritone away from the overall tonic. Second, the sense of arrival of the recapitulation is divided in two by this fact, in that the return of the main theme is separated from the reappearance of its home tonality. The coda of the movement takes on the character of a passacaglia, a feature first noted by the composer Anatol Vieru.

The second movement opens with a gradual accumulation of voices, at first suggesting a fugal exposition with a first answer at the interval of a tritone, but lacking a countersubject. Its burlesque-scherzando character, contrasting with the dark quality of the first movement, resembles those toccatas revived in the music of Debussy and Ravel, or the neoclassical, motoric style adopted in the early twentieth century by composers like Prokofiev. Some other passages resemble the diatonicism of Stravinsky’s Piano Sonata, which was composed slightly later, in the summer and autumn of 1924. The movement does not adhere to any conventional formal scheme and is built economically from a very small number of elements. Although the second theme returns several times, suggesting a rondo form, the recurrences are subject to variations. The most striking of these variants is in a limping 5/4 meter, reminiscent of folk dances such as the șocâcili from Banat, the ghimpele, and șobolanul from Oltenia and Muntenia, and the hodoroaga from the Ardeal and Moldova regions. Myriam Marbe finds that this movement’s spontaneity and exuberant character suggests, through its pulsating motion, a surging crowd at a public celebration, in a stylized manner similar to the one Stravinsky creates in Petrushka.

In an interview with Bernard Gavoty broadcast by the French Radio on 25 January 1952, Enescu played part of the finale of this First Piano Sonata as an example of a musical transposition of the atmosphere of the Romanian Plain at night.(Gavoty 1952

The movement begins evocatively with a single repeated note in an irregular rhythm, whose gentle accents eventually produce the distant signal of a rising minor third, from which the first motif gradually emerges. Hesitant motivic statements separated by long pauses produce a characteristic "spatial poetry" for this movement, which is one of the most striking features of the Enescian style.

As with the second movement, the form of the finale is difficult to assign to a conventional model. It may be interpreted as a ternary form, or else as a modified sonata-allegro.

== Discography ==
- George Enescu: Suita nr. 2 pentru pian în re major, op. 10; Sonata nr. 1 pentru pian în fa diez minor, op. 24. Li-min-Cean, piano (Op. 10); Maria Fotino, piano (Op. 24 No. 1). LP recording, 1 disc: analog, 33⅓ rpm, monaural, 12 in. Electrecord ECE 025. Bucharest: Electrecord, 196?.
- George Enescu: Sonata nr. 1 pentru pian în fa diez minor, op. 24, nr. 1; Sonata nr. 3 pentru pian în re major, op. 24, nr. 3. Maria Fotino, piano. Recorded October 1980, Studioul de la Casa Scinteii. LP recording, 1 disc: analog, 33⅓ rpm, stereo, 12 in. Electrecord ST-ECE 01691. Bucharest: Electrecord, [1981].
- George Enescu: Sonate für Klavier fis-moll op. 24/1; Sonate für Klavier und Violoncello op. 26/2; Rapsodia Romina für Klavier, op. 11/1. Lory Wallfisch, piano; Julien Musafia, piano (Op. 11, No. 1); Julius Berger, cello (Op. 26, No. 2). Recorded. 25–27 October 1993, in the Konzerthaus, Kronberg/Taunus. CD recording, 1 disc: digital, 4¾ in., stereo. EBS 6043. Bietigheim-Bissingen: EBS Records, 1995.
- Enesco: Œuvres pour piano. Cristian Petrescu, piano. Recorded by Sender Freies Berlin, July 1994 and March 1995. CD recording, 3 discs: digital, 4¾ in., stereo. Accord 476 2394 (476 2395; 476 2396; 476 2397). Universal Classics France, 1998.
- Romania. Dana Ciocarlie piano. Recorded April 2000, Salle Guillaume Farel, Marseille. CD recording, 1 disc: digital, 4¾ in., stereo. Empreinte Digitale ED 13122. Marseille, France: L'empreinte digitale, 2000.
- Raluca Stirbat Plays Enescu, Silvestri, Constantinescu, Rachmaninoff/Kreisler. Raluca Stirbat, piano. Enescu’s Sonata No. 1 recorded April 2004 at Schweizer Radio DRS Studio Zurich. CD recording, 1 disc: digital, 4¾ in., stereo. Gramola 98905. Vienna: Gramola, 2011.
- Enescu: Piano Music, Vol. 2: Piano Sonata No. 1; Piano Sonata No. 2; Prelude and Fugue in C Major; Nocturne in D-flat Major; Scherzo; Pièce sur la nom de Fauré; Luiza Borac, piano. Recorded 4, 5, and 7 July 2005 at St. Dunstan's Church, Mayfield, England. SACD recording, 2 discs: digital 4¾ in., multi/hybrid. Avie AV2081. [Basel]: Pert Beratungs AG, 2006.
- Five Sonatas: Ernesto Halffter, George Enescu, Igor Stravinsky, Leoš Jánáček. Andrew Rangell, piano. Bridge 9205. 2006.
- George Enescu: Piano Sonata No. 1; Suite No. 2; Choral; Carillon nocturne. Matei Varga, piano. CD recording, 1 disc: digital, 4¾ in., stereo. Naxos 8.572120. Naxos, 2010.
- George Enescu: Complete Works for Piano Solo. Raluca Stirbat, piano. Sonata recorded Universität für Musik und darstellende Kunst Wien, April or June 2015. CD recording, 3 discs: digital, 4¾ in., stereo. Hänssler Classic 98.060. Holzgerlingen: Hänssler Classic im SCM-Verlag GmbH & Co. KG, 2015. Includes the early version (1912) of the first movement of Sonata No. 1.
- George Enescu, Béla Bartók, Erkki-Sven Tüür. Mihkel Poll, piano. Recorded at Sello Hall in Espoo, Finland, 12–13 October and 2–3 November 2014. CD recording, 1 disc: digital, 4¾ in., stereo. Dux 1256. Warsaw: Dux Recording Publishers, 2015.
- Paris [Music by Ravel, Debussy, and Enescu]. Elisabeth Leonskaja, piano. Recorded in Berlin, Meistersaal 14–15 July 2013. CD recording, 1 disc: digital, 4¾ in., stereo. EAS 29237. Berlin: EaSonus, 2015.
- Enescu: Complete Works for Piano, Vol. 1. Josu de Solaun, piano. CD recording, 1 disc: digital, 4¾ in., stereo. Grand Piano GP705. [Kowloon City, Hong Kong]: HNH International Limited, 2016.
