= Attilio Brugnoli =

Italian composer, pianist and musicologist

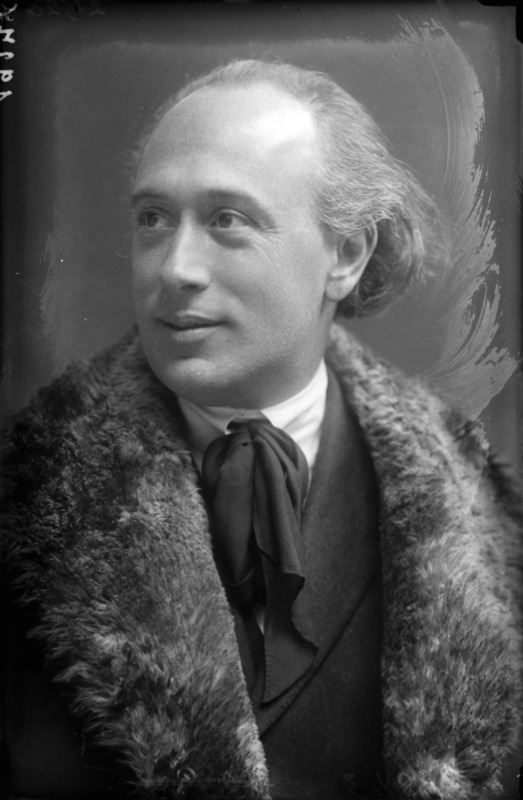
- Born: 7 October 1880; Rome, Italy
- Died: 10 July 1937 (aged 56); Bolzano, Italy

Attilio Brugnoli (7 October 1880 – 10 July 1937) was an Italian composer, pianist and musicologist.

== Life and career ==
Born in Rome, Brugnoli graduated in piano and composition at the San Pietro a Maiella Conservatory. He soon began a concert career, both as a member of the Waldemar Mayer quartet and as a soloist.

In 1905 he took part to the Anton Rubinstein Competition, and won the composition prize, beating Béla Bartók. In 1907 he was simultaneously offered the positions of academic chair of the piano faculties at the Naples Conservatory and the Parma Conservatory, ultimately deciding to accept the position in Parma, and later became professor at the Conservatorio Luigi Cherubini in Florence and at the Conservatorio Santa Cecilia in his hometown. He was author of several publications about piano teaching and piano techniques. Married with pianist Elvira Silla, he suddenly died in Bolzano, where he had gone as to serve as commissioner for the final exams at the city conservatory.
