= McCain (surname) =

- Gender: Unisex
- Language: English

Origin
- Language: Irish Gaelic
- Origin: Mac Cathain
- Meaning: Grandson or Son of Cahan

Other names
- Variant forms: McCain, O'kane, Mckeane
- Cognates: "Mac Cathain & O Cathain

McCain is an Irish & Scottish English-language surname of Irish origin derived from Gaelic. The surname McCain first appeared in Derry in the province of Ulster and is Anglicised from "Mac Cathain and Ó Catháin Other spelling variations include O'Kane, Keane, McClaskey, Kane, O'Cain, McCain and many more

== People with the surname ==
=== American military/political family ===
- Many McCains fought in the American Revolution; one such was Capt John Young McCain (1760–1850) Gen. of George Washington's staff
- John S. McCain Sr. (1884–1945), US Navy vice admiral
  - John S. McCain Jr. (1911–1981), US Navy admiral, son of John S. McCain, Sr.
  - Roberta McCain (1912–2020), wife of John S. McCain, Jr., mother of John S. McCain III
    - Sandy McCain (1934–2019), sister of John S. McCain III
    - John McCain (John S. McCain III) (1936–2018), US Senator, presidential candidate (2000, 2008), navy pilot, Vietnam War POW, son of John S. McCain, Jr.
    - Carol McCain (born 1938), ex-wife of John S. McCain III
      - Douglas McCain, adopted son of John S. McCain III
      - Andrew McCain (born 1962), adopted son of John S. McCain III
      - Sidney McCain (born 1966), daughter of John S. McCain III
    - Cindy McCain (born 1954), wife of John S. McCain III
      - Meghan McCain (born 1984), daughter of John S. McCain III
      - Renee Swift McCain (born 1983), wife of John Sidney McCain IV
      - James McCain (born 1988), son of John S. McCain III
      - Bridget McCain (born 1991), adopted daughter of John S. McCain III
    - Joe McCain (born 1942), brother of John S. McCain III
- Matthew L. McCain (born 1983), US Army Sergeant Major, current Senior Army Career Counselor XVIII Airborne Corps, Ft. Liberty, NC.

=== Other people with the surname ===
- Ben McCain (born 1955), co-host of a morning television program in Oklahoma City
- Betty Ray McCain (1931–2022), American politician
- Bobby McCain (born 1993), American footballer
- Brandi McCain (born 1979), American former basketball player
- Brice McCain (born 1986), American footballer
- Butch McCain, half of the singing songwriting team, The McCain Brothers
- Chris McCain (born 1991), American footballer
- Donald "Ginger" McCain (1930–2011), British horse trainer
- Edwin McCain (born 1970), American singer-songwriter
- Elske McCain (born 1976), American film actress
- Eric McCain (born 1986), former professional gridiron footballer
- Frances Lee McCain (born 1944), American actress
- Franklin McCain (1941–2014), American civil rights activist and member of the Greensboro Four
- Fred McCain (1917–1997), Canadian politician
- Gillian McCain (born 1966), Canadian poet, author, and photography collector
- Harrison McCain (1927–2004), Canadian businessmen co-founder of McCain Foods
- Henry Pinckney McCain (1861–1941), officer in the United States Army
- Hugh H. McCain (1854–????), produce dealer and political figure in New Brunswick, Canada
- Ida McCain (1884–????), American architect
- Jared McCain (born 2004), American basketball player
- Jerry McCain (1930–2012), blues performer
- Justin McCain (born 1979), American musician, songwriter, producer and label executive
- Kelly McCain (born 1983), former professional tennis player
- Mac McCain (born 1998), American football player
- Margaret McCain (born 1934), Canadian philanthropist and lieutenant governor of New Brunswick (1994–1997)
- Michael McCain (born 1958), president and CEO of Maple Leaf Foods
- Patrick McCain (born 1992), indoor footballer
- Robert Stacy McCain (born 1959), American author and journalist
- Rufus McCain (1903–1940), Alcatraz prisoner
- Scott McCain (born 1958), former professional tennis player
- Stephen McCain, retired American gymnast
- Vernon McCain (1908–1993), football coach
- W. T. McCain (1913–1993), American legislator and judge
- Wallace McCain (1930–2011), Canadian businessmen and co-founder of McCain Foods
- William David McCain (1907–1993), American archivist and college president
- Yvonne McCain (1948–2011), lead plaintiff in landmark lawsuit

== Characters ==
- Chase McCain, the main protagonist of the video game Lego City Undercover
- Desmond McCain, the main antagonist in the eight Alex Rider book, Crocodile Tears
- Eden McCain, a character from the TV show Heroes
- Scarlett McCain, a character from the book series The Outlaws Scarlett and Browne
- Lucas McCain, a character from the TV show The Rifleman
  - Mark McCain, the son of Lucas McCain

== See also ==
- McCain (disambiguation)
- McKean (disambiguation)
