= Tom Machan =

Canadian football player

Profile
- Position: Tackle

Personal information
- Born: 1942 or 1943 (age 83–84); Rocky Mountain House, Alberta, Canada
- Listed height: 6 ft 1 in (1.85 m)
- Listed weight: 250 lb (113 kg)

Career history
- 1964–1966: Edmonton Eskimos

Tom Machan (born 1942 or 1943) is a Canadian football player who played for the Edmonton Eskimos. He previously played football for the Edmonton Huskies.
