= British Commonwealth Pacific Airlines =

Australian–British airline

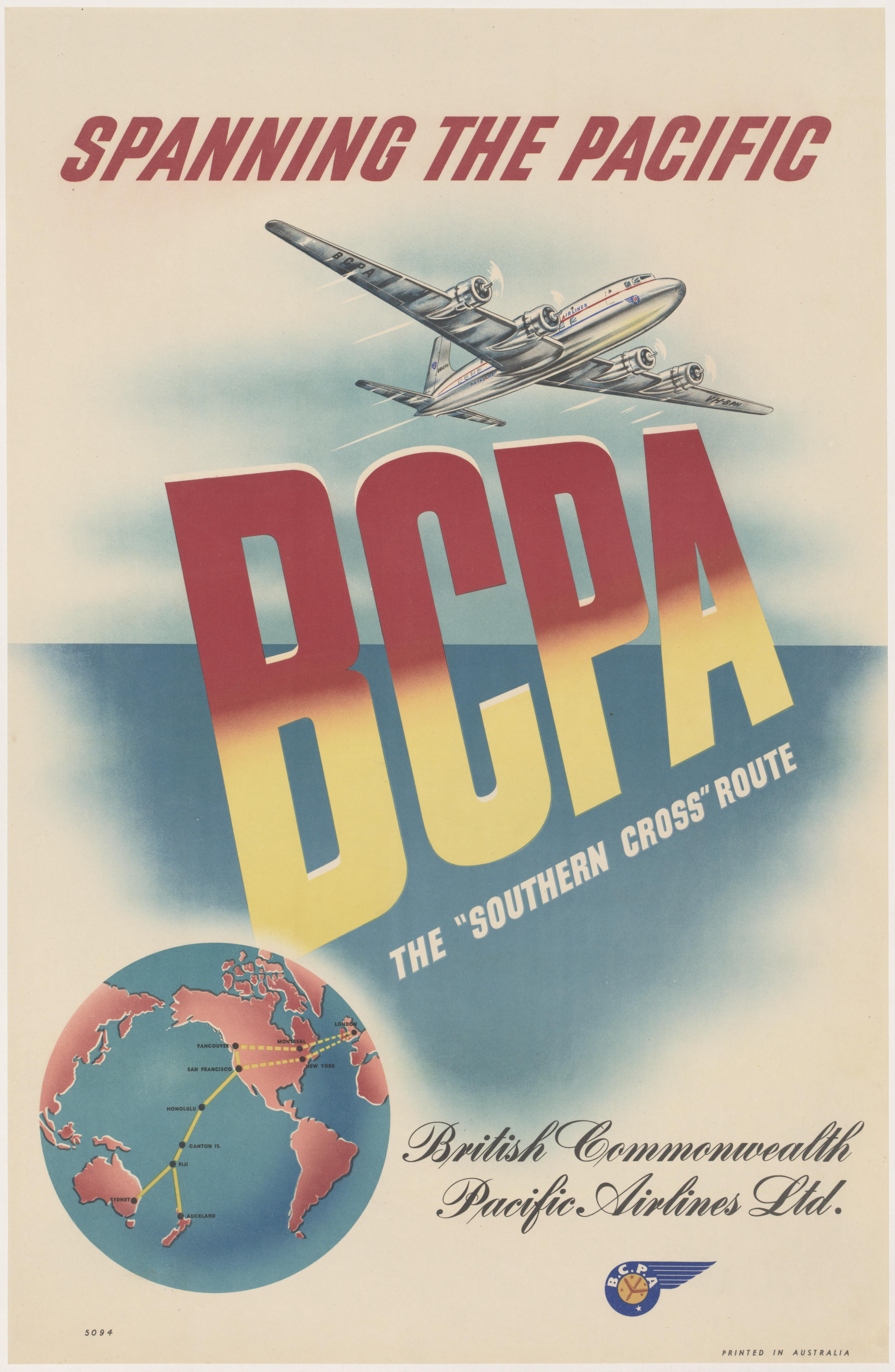
- Founded: June 1946
- Commenced operations: September 1946
- Ceased operations: 1954 (Taken over by Qantas)
- Headquarters: Sydney, New South Wales, Australia

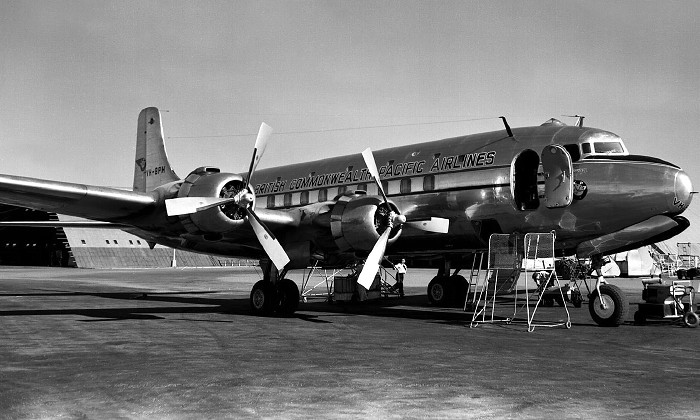
British Commonwealth Pacific Airlines Douglas DC-6 airliner at Brisbane Airport.

British Commonwealth Pacific Airlines or BCPA, was an airline registered in New South Wales, Australia in June 1946 with headquarters in Sydney. It was formed by the governments of Australia (50%), New Zealand (30%) and the United Kingdom (20%) to pursue trans-Pacific flights. BCPA was later taken over by Qantas.

== History ==
BCPA was formed by treaty through an "Agreement between the Governments of Australia, New Zealand and the United Kingdom for the Formation of British Commonwealth Pacific Airlines Limited" with an initial capital of £10,000 Australian. The initial agreement was signed on 4 August 1947, with ownership restrictions between the governments removed on 27 October 1949.

The original BCPA route was Sydney – Auckland – Fiji – Canton Island – Hawaii – San Francisco – Vancouver and later included Melbourne. Initially, BCPA chartered all flights to Australian National Airways, which used its Douglas DC-4s. The inaugural flight departed from Sydney on 15 September 1946.

In late 1948, BCPA took delivery of the first of four Douglas DC-6 aircraft, outfitted as Pullman-type sleepers with small port holes at each bedside. Each aircraft was named for one of the four sailing vessels of Captain Cook, Resolution, Discovery, Adventure and Endeavour.

The airline ordered six de Havilland Comet jet airliners in 1952 for delivery in 1954. In 1953 it agreed to buy three Comet IIs for delivery at the end of 1956 and retain two of the DC-6s for tourist-class carriage.

In October 1953 the three government owners discussed a takeover of the airline by Qantas Empire Airways. In 1954 it was announced that Qantas Empire Airways would take over the BCPA services between Australia and North America and would take over the order for three Comets.

== Accidents and incidents ==
=== BCPA Flight 304 ===
A Douglas DC-6 operating BCPA Flight 304 crashed on approach to San Francisco International Airport on 29 October 1953. Among the passengers killed in the crash was American concert pianist William Kapell whose estate sued BCPA, BOAC (which was alleged to have sold Kapell the ticket), and Qantas, which had taken over BCPA. In 1964 Kapell's widow and two children were awarded US$924,396 damages. This was later retracted and the Kapell family received only the standard $7,000 internationally agreed award.

== See also ==
- List of defunct airlines of Australia
- Aviation in Australia
