= USS McAnn =

Cannon-class destroyer escort

Coordinates: 22.90031°S 43.17403°W

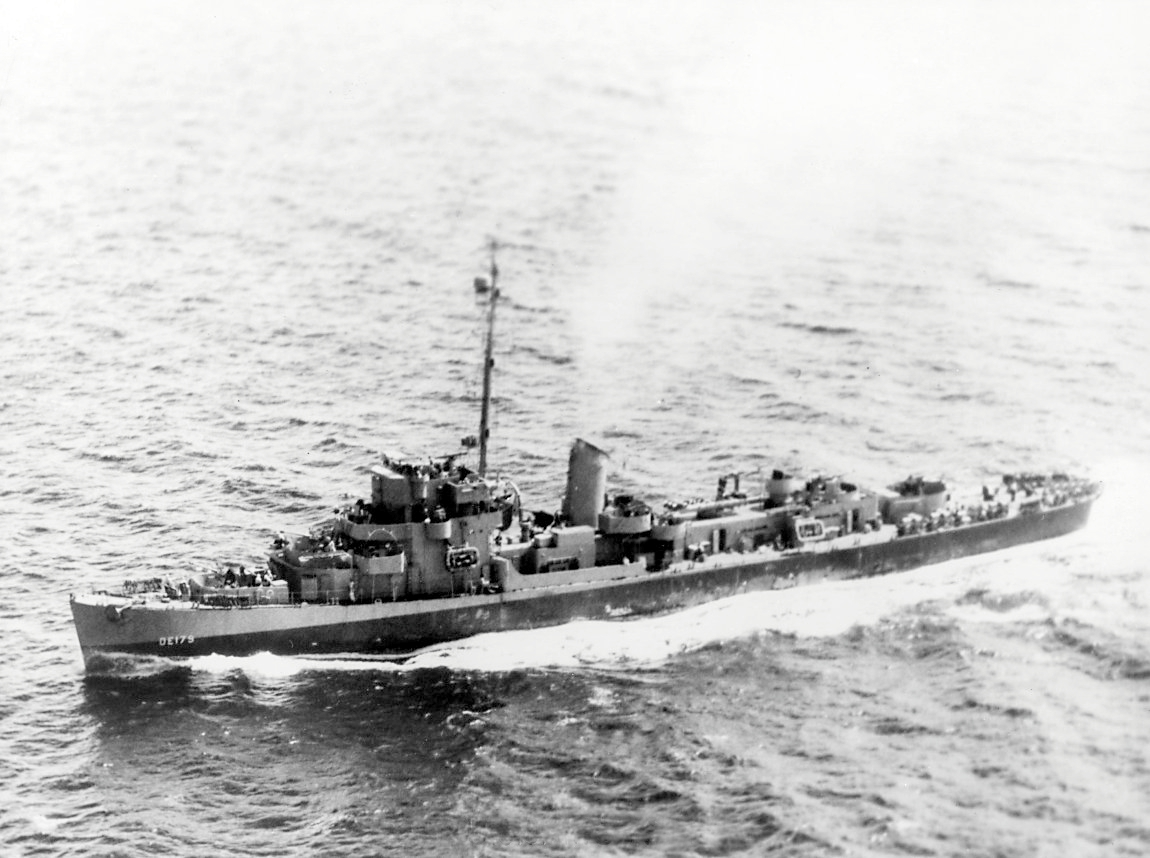

History

United States
- Name: USS McAnn
- Namesake: Donald Roy McAnn
- Builder: Federal Shipbuilding and Drydock Company, Newark, New Jersey
- Laid down: 17 May 1943
- Launched: 5 September 1943
- Commissioned: 11 October 1943
- Decommissioned: 15 August 1944
- Stricken: 20 July 1953
- Fate: Leased to Brazil, 15 August 1944; Transferred to Brazil, 30 June 1953

Brazil
- Name: Comandante Bauru (D-18, U-28, Be-4)
- Acquired: 15 August 1944
- Commissioned: 16 August 1944
- Decommissioned: 1982
- Home port: Rio de Janeiro
- Status: Museum ship

General characteristics
- Class & type: Cannon-class destroyer escort
- Displacement: 1,240 long tons (1,260 t) standard; 1,620 long tons (1,646 t) full
- Length: 306 ft (93 m) o/a; 300 ft (91 m) w/l
- Beam: 36 ft 10 in (11.23 m)
- Draft: 11 ft 8 in (3.56 m)
- Propulsion: 4 × GM Mod. 16-278A diesel engines with electric drive, 6,000 shp (4,474 kW), 2 screws
- Speed: 21 knots (39 km/h; 24 mph)
- Range: 10,800 nmi (20,000 km) at 12 kn (22 km/h; 14 mph)
- Complement: 15 officers and 201 enlisted
- Armament: 3 × single Mk.22 3"/50 caliber guns; 1 × twin 40 mm Mk.1 AA gun; 8 × 20 mm Mk.4 AA guns; 3 × 21-inch (533 mm) torpedo tubes; 1 × Hedgehog Mk.10 anti-submarine mortar (144 rounds); 8 × Mk.6 depth charge projectors; 2 × Mk.9 depth charge tracks

USS McAnn (DE-179) is a retired Cannon-class destroyer escort built for the United States Navy during World War II. She served in the Atlantic Ocean and provided escort service against submarine and air attack for Navy vessels and convoys. She was transferred to the Brazilian Navy in 1944 and renamed as Bauru. She is now a museum ship preserved at the Brazilian Navy Cultural Center in Rio de Janeiro.

== Namesake ==
Donald Roy McAnn was born on 23 June 1911 in Rochester, New York. He enlisted in the United States Navy on 16 August 1932. During the early months of World War II he served on USS Enterprise as a gunner's mate first class. On 26 October 1942 U.S. carrier task forces fought a numerically superior Japanese force in the Battle of Santa Cruz Islands. During the air battle, he took valuable photographs from an exposed position on the forward port .50 caliber gun mount. In addition he rendered assistance to the gun crew and displayed outstanding courage without regard for his own safety. While relieving one of the gunners, he was struck by an exploding bomb fragment and fatally wounded. He was buried at sea. He was posthumously awarded the Navy Cross.

== Construction and commissioning ==
The ship was laid down by Federal Shipbuilding and Drydock Co., Newark, New Jersey, on 17 May 1943; launched on 5 September 1943; sponsored by Mrs. Ethel Marie McAnn; and commissioned at New York on 11 October 1943.

== World War II Atlantic Ocean operations ==
After shakedown off Bermuda, McAnn operated along the east coast from Newport, Rhode Island, to Charleston, South Carolina, until 19 December 1943 when she departed Norfolk, Virginia, on a convoy escort run to the Panama Canal Zone. She reached Coco Solo on 26 December, thence sailed the 31st for duty out of Key West, Florida. Arriving there on 3 January 1944, she for the next several weeks with the Fleet Sound School and trained sailors in anti-submarine warfare techniques.

Assigned to Escort Division 24, McAnn sailed for the Caribbean on 29 February. Steaming via Trinidad, she joined Convoy TJ-25 on 5 March and screened the ships through stormy seas en route to Recife, Brazil. On the 15th she rescued the entire crew of 10 men from a B-17 Flying Fortress which had splashed off the Brazilian coast the day before. McAnn arrived Recife on 16 March.

Between 2 and 12 April McAnn cruised to Trinidad in the screen of Convoy JT-27, and during the next three months she completed three additional escort runs between the Caribbean and Brazil. She completed this duty on 12 July and four days later departed Recife as screen for Memphis (CL-13). She cruised the South Atlantic in search of German submarines until returning to Recife on 30 July.

== Transfer and Brazilian service ==
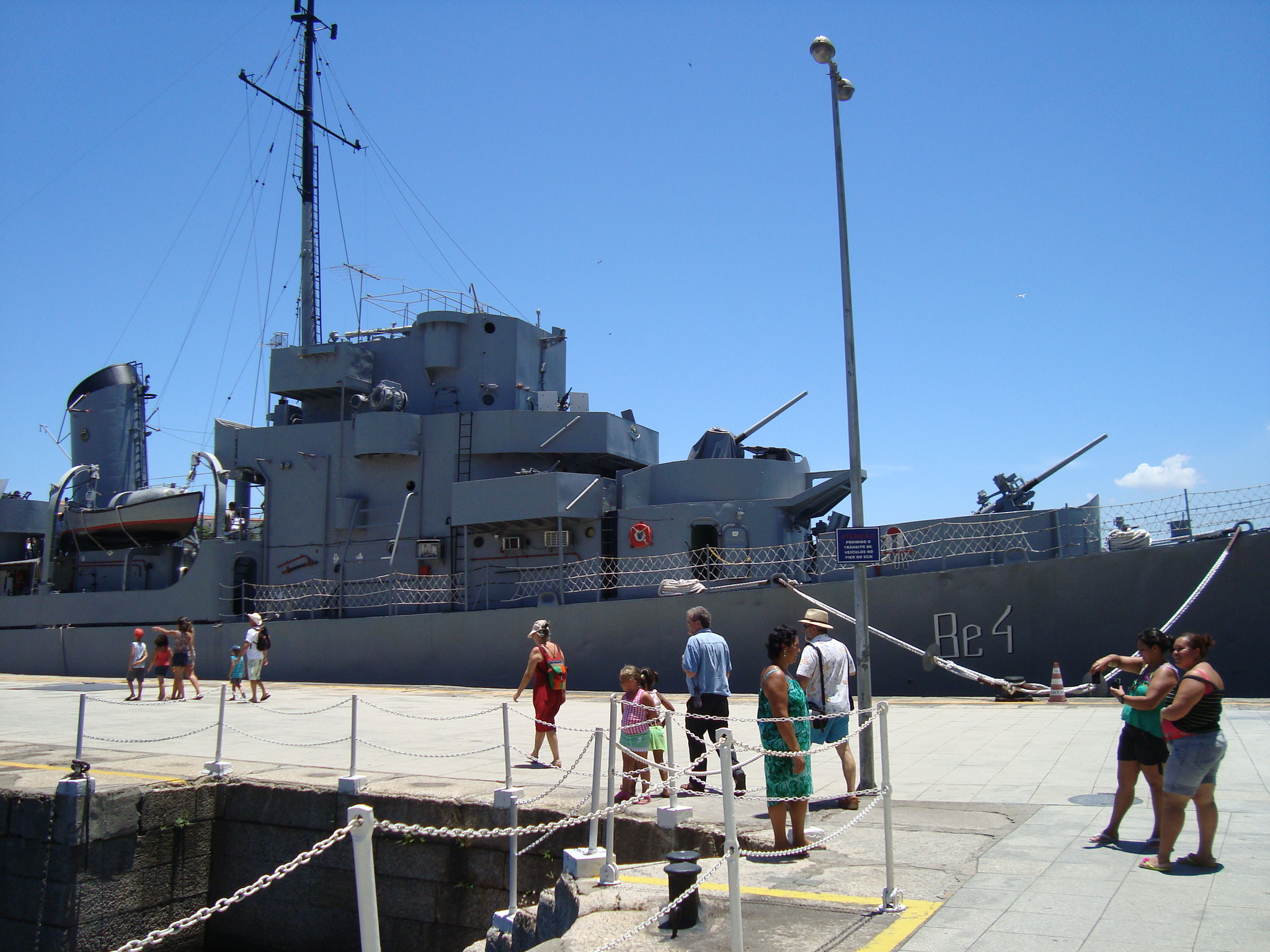
Bauru as a museum ship in Rio de Janeiro.

McAnn underwent an upkeep and then steamed to Natal, Brazil, arriving on 10 August 1944. She decommissioned there on 15 August and was transferred, under lend lease, to Brazil on the same date. She was commissioned in the Brazilian Navy on 16 August as Bauru. She served on loan with Brazilian Navy until 30 June 1953 when she was retransferred to Brazil, permanently, under the Mutual Defense Assistance Pact.
