= Felix Blumenfeld =

Russian composer and conductor (1863–1931)

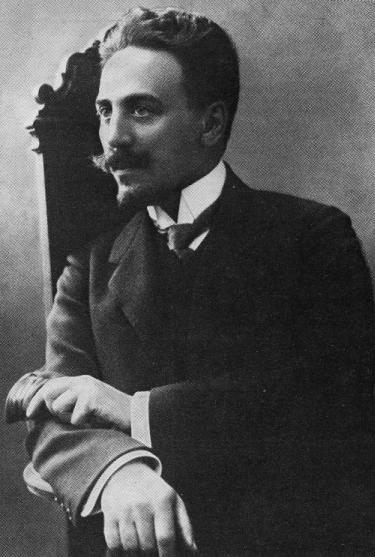
- Born: 7 April 1863; Kovalyovka, Russian Empire
- Died: 21 January 1931 (aged 67); Moscow, Russian SFSR, Soviet Union
- Occupations: Pianist; composer; conductor
- Parents: Michael Frantz Blumenfeld; Maria Szymanowska

Felix Mikhailovich Blumenfeld (Russian: Фе́ликс Миха́йлович Блуменфе́льд; 19 April [O.S. 7 April] 1863 – 21 January 1931) was a Russian and Soviet composer and conductor of the Imperial Opera St-Petersburg, pianist, and teacher.

== Early life ==
He was born on 19 April [O.S. 7 April] 1863 in Kovalyovka, near the city of Yelisavetgrad, in Kherson Governorate of the Russian Empire (now Kropyvnytskyi, Ukraine). He was the son of Mikhail Frantsevich Blumenfeld, of Austrian Jewish origin, and Maria Szymanowska. He was the uncle of Heinrich Neuhaus and first cousin, once removed of Karol Szymanowski (Felix's mother and Karol's father, Stanisław Szymanowski, were cousins).

Blumenfeld studied with Gustav Neuhaus, who was married to his older sister. Then he studied composition at the St. Petersburg Conservatory under Nikolai Rimsky-Korsakov and piano under Fedor Stein between 1881 and 1885. He then taught piano there himself from 1895 until 1918, whilst also serving as conductor of the Mariinsky Theatre until 1911.

== Career ==
The Mariinsky saw the premieres of the operas composed by his mentor Rimsky-Korsakov. He was also the conductor at the Russian premiere of Wagner's opera Tristan und Isolde.

In 1908, he conducted the Paris premiere of Modest Mussorgsky's opera Boris Godunov.

From 1918 to 1922, he taught in Kiev, where, amongst others, Vladimir Horowitz was a pupil in his masterclasses. He returned to the Moscow Conservatory in 1922, teaching there until his death. Other famous pupils of his include Simon Barere, Maria Yudina, Nathan Perelman, Anatole Kitain and Maria Grinberg. He died in Moscow on 21 January 1931.

As a pianist, he played many of the compositions of his Russian contemporaries. His own compositions, which showed the influence of Frédéric Chopin and Pyotr Ilyich Tchaikovsky, include a symphony, numerous pieces for solo piano, an Allegro de Concert for piano and orchestra, and lieder.

== Sources ==
- "Блуменфельд, Феликс Михайлович" . Brockhaus and Efron Encyclopedic Dictionary (in Russian). 1906.
- Braun, Joachim (2001). "Blumenfeld, Felix". Grove Music Online.
