= Anton Rubinstein Competition =

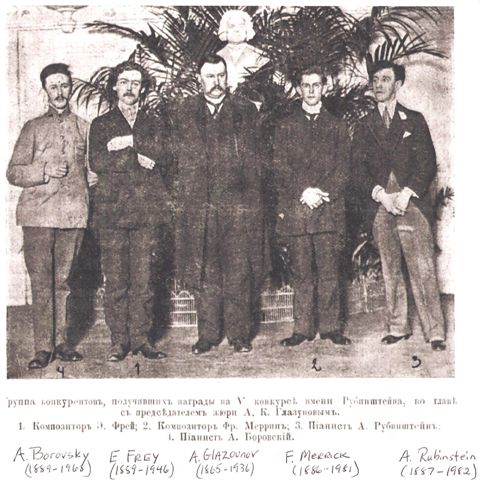
Anton Rubinstein Competition Participants 1910

The Anton Rubinstein Competition is the name of a music competition that has existed in two incarnations. It was first staged in Russia and Western Europe between 1890 and 1910, and prizes were awarded for piano playing and composition. Since 2003, it has been run in Germany as a piano competition only.

== Original competition ==
The original Anton Rubinstein Competition was staged by Anton Rubinstein himself in 1890. Two prizes of 5000 francs were awarded to the winners in composition and piano. Winners include:

- 1890 ( (Russian Empire) St. Petersburg): Nikolay Dubasov, piano; Ferruccio Busoni, composition (Concert Piece for Piano and Orchestra, Op. 31a)
- 1895 ( (German Empire) Berlin): Josef Lhévinne, piano; Henryk Melcer-Szczawiński, composition (Konzertstück, Piano Trio)
- 1900 ( (Austria-Hungary) Vienna): Émile Bosquet, piano; Alexander Goedicke, composition
- 1905 ( (France) Paris): Wilhelm Backhaus, piano; Attilio Brugnoli composition, (Béla Bartók took second prize).
- 1910 ( (Russian Empire) St. Petersburg): Emil Frey, composition prize (Piano Trio), diploma to Frank Merrick; Alfred Hoehn, piano. (Other piano finalists included Issay Dobrowen, Edwin Fischer, Artur Lemba and Arthur Rubinstein.)

According to The Musical Times of October 1, 1910, the Fifth International Competition for the Rubinstein prize commenced on August 22. Two prizes of 5,000 francs were offered, for composition and for piano playing. The two successful competitors were both German musicians – Emil Frey (as composer; he was actually Swiss) and Alfred Hoehn, professor at the Hoschsche Konservatorium in Frankfurt (as pianist; he was actually Austrian). Diplomas for excellence in piano playing were awarded to Arthur Rubinstein, Emil Frey and Alexander Borovsky. The Board of Examiners consisted of only Russian musicians. Alexander Glazunov, Chairman of the Jury, presented the awards.

The first prize for pianists graduating from Saint Petersburg Conservatory was named after Rubinstein as well; Sergei Prokofiev won the prize in 1914; Maria Yudina recalled that she and her classmate Vladimir Sofronitsky had won the prize in 1920.

== Revived competition ==
Since 2003, the "Anton G. Rubinstein" International Piano Competition has been revived in Dresden, Germany. Winners include:

- 2003: (Venezuela) Gabriela Martinez
- 2005: (Ukraine) Kateryna Titova
- 2007: (Kazakhstan) Amir Tebenikhin
- 2009: (Ukraine) Alexej Gorlatch
- 2012: (China) Hao Zhu
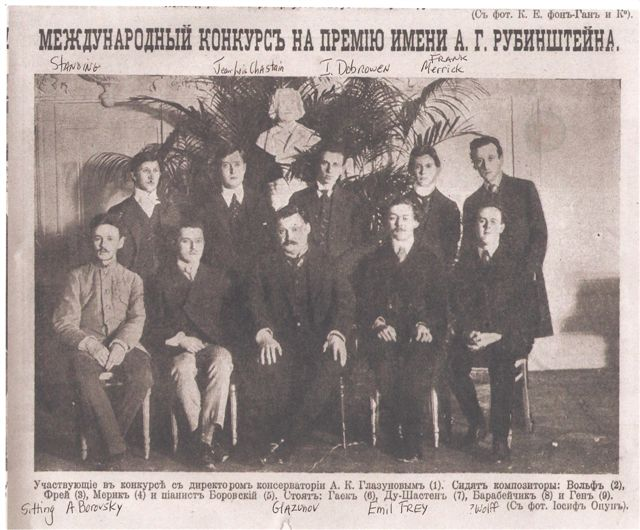
Participants in the 1910 Anton Rubinstein Piano Competition in St. Petersburg, Russia. Seated at far left Alexander Borovsky

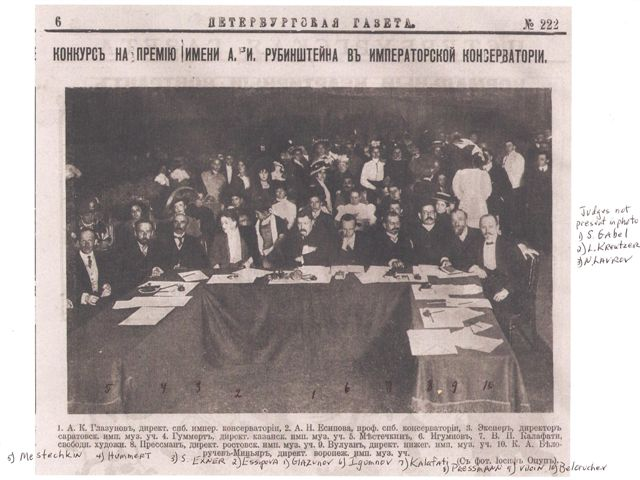
Judges 1910 Anton Rubinstein Piano Competition in St. Petersburg, Russia
