= Alexander Ghindin =

Russian pianist (born 1977)

Alexander Sheftelyevich Ghindin (Russian: Александр Шефтельевич Гиндин; born 17 April 1977, Moscow) is a Russian pianist. He won first prize at the Cleveland International Piano Competition in 2007.

A student of Mikhail Sergeyevich Voskresensky. He became a laureate of the Tchaikovsky Competition at the age of 17 in 1994.
