= Mikhail Rudy =

- Born: 3 April 1953 (age 73); Tashkent, Uzbekistan
- Origin: Paris, France
- Genres: Classical, Jazz
- Occupations: Pianist, television broadcaster, video film-maker, writer
- Years active: 1977–present

Mikhail Rudy (Russian: Михаил Рудый: born 3 April 1953) is a French pianist, who has won several awards for his recordings including the Grand Prix du disque.

== Life and career ==
Rudy was born in Tashkent, Uzbekistan where his family had been deported by the Soviet regime. His grandparents were imprisoned in concentration camps. His family moved from Tashkent to Siberia, then to a small village near Voronezh until they were finally "rehabilitated" in Stalino (Donetsk), in eastern Ukraine.

Rudy's interest in music began at the age of 5 when he heard a neighbor play the violin. Despite difficult living conditions, Rudy began music lessons and pursued his studies in music at the Tchaikovsky Conservatory in Moscow under Yakov Flier. He greatly impressed the jury at the Marguerite Long Competition in 1975 through his performance of Beethoven's Hammerklavier Sonata (regarded as among the most challenging solo works in the entire piano repertoire) in which he won the First Prize.

Rudy asked for political asylum and settled down in France in the mid 1970s. He made his debut in Paris on the occasion of Marc Chagall's 90th birthday in 1977, performing Beethoven's Triple Concerto with Mstislav Rostropovitch and Isaac Stern. From then on Rudy's career included performances with such world-famous orchestras as the Berlin Philharmonic and renowned conductors such as Lorin Maazel, Herbert von Karajan and Michael Tilson Thomas.

Rudy made a return tour to Russia in 1989 with the St. Petersburg Philharmonic. He also founded and was artistic director of the Festival de Saint-Riquier in France.

As well as being a concert pianist, Mikhail Rudy has performed with jazz pianist Misha Alperin with whom he devised a program entitled Double Dream, performing improvised compositions based on the classical repertoire. This included partly rewritten and partly improvised works by Haydn, Beethoven, Schumann, Chopin, Debussy, Janáček and Scriabin. This program has already been performed in Norway, France and Germany receiving enthusiastic responses from audiences.

Rudy has also taken part in theatrical shows and has written a book, The Novel of a Pianist, published in 2008 by Le Rocher. He has also written and performed a theatrical and musical play after Władysław Szpilman's book The Pianist along with French actor Robin Renucci. The show ran in Paris in 2005 for more than four months and received great acclaim from both audiences and critics alike. A tour of forty-five cities throughout France followed in 2006.

Rudy is a respected television broadcaster and is active in experimental video-filming and writing. He has prepared several series including a BBC television documentary on the life and works of Tchaikovsky and radio projects for France-Musique highlighting the life and works of composers such as Alexander Scriabin, Johannes Brahms, Karol Szymanowski and Leoš Janáček.

== Awards ==
Mikhail Rudy is the recipient of the following awards:

- The Liszt First Prize in Budapest for his anthology of piano works by Franz Liszt.
- The Charles Cros Academy Prize for his Scriabin cycle.
- Grand prix du disque for his recital of piano works by Karol Szymanowski.

== Selected discography ==
- Rachmaninov: Complete Piano Concertos; Paganini Rhapsody; Tchaikovsy: Piano Concerto No. 1 with the St. Petersburg Philharmonic conducted by Mariss Jansons (EMI Classics)
- Shostakovich: Piano Concertos Nos. 1 & 2 with the London Philharmonic and Berlin Philharmonic conducted by Mariss Jansons (EMI Classics)
- Janáček: Concertino; Capriccio with L'Orchestre de L'Opéra National de Paris conducted by Sir Charles Mackerras (EMI Classics)
- Brahms: Works for Solo Piano (EMI Classics)
- Chopin: Piano Sonata No. 2 and 24 Preludes (EMI Classics)
- Stravinsky: Petrouchka (transcription by Stravinsky/Rudy) (EMI Classics)
- Solo piano works by Szymanowski, Ravel, Schubert, Liszt and Scriabin (EMI Classics)
- Original piano works and partly unpublished transcriptions by Richard Wagner (EMI Classics)
