= Yvonne McCain =

Yvonne McCain (1948 - 2011) was the lead plaintiff in a lawsuit, which led to a landmark ruling in 1986 by the Appellate Division of the State Supreme Court in Manhattan, stating that New York City could not deny emergency shelter for homeless families with children. However, the case was not settled until 2008, when it was settled by New York City and the Legal Aid Society. The McCain case was settled in 2008 in the Boston v. City of New York case, and the settlement upheld the legal right to shelter for homeless families and children.

== Lawsuit ==
The lawsuit in which McCain was the lead plaintiff, which was a class-action suit filed in 1983, was initially called McCain v. Koch, referring to mayor Ed Koch, but the name of the lawsuit changed as new mayors of New York City took office. In 1983, McCain was homeless and had children, and had been placed by New York City at the welfare hotel Martinique, which had poor conditions. She had been evicted from her apartment in 1982 after refusing to pay rent because her landlord refused to make repairs. She was a battered woman, and as she moved from city-supported apartments to shelters and back, her husband once found her and broke her nose.

== Life and death ==
In 1996 McCain and her children were able to move into a rent-subsidized two-bedroom apartment on Staten Island, where she was living at the time of her death in 2011. She worked as a nurse's aide for some time, and earned an associate degree in human services from the Borough of Manhattan Community College in 2005. In the years before her death she worked in the health services office of the Borough of Manhattan Community College. She died of cancer in 2011.

McCain's obituary was included in The Socialite who Killed a Nazi with Her Bare Hands: And 144 Other Fascinating People who Died this Year, a collection of The New York Times obituaries, published in 2012.
