= Moura Lympany =

English concert pianist (1916–2005)

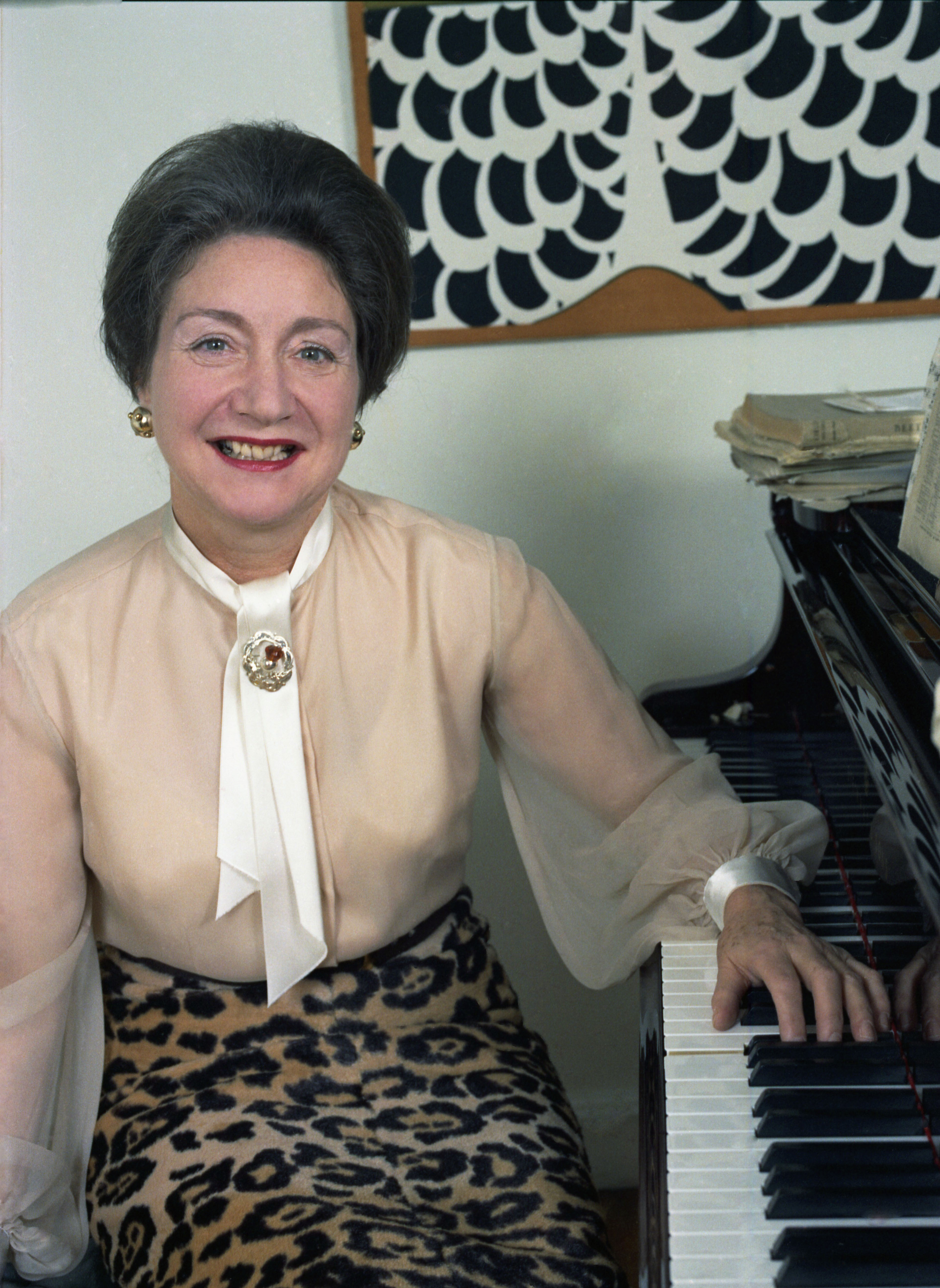
Lympany photographed by Allan Warren, 1973

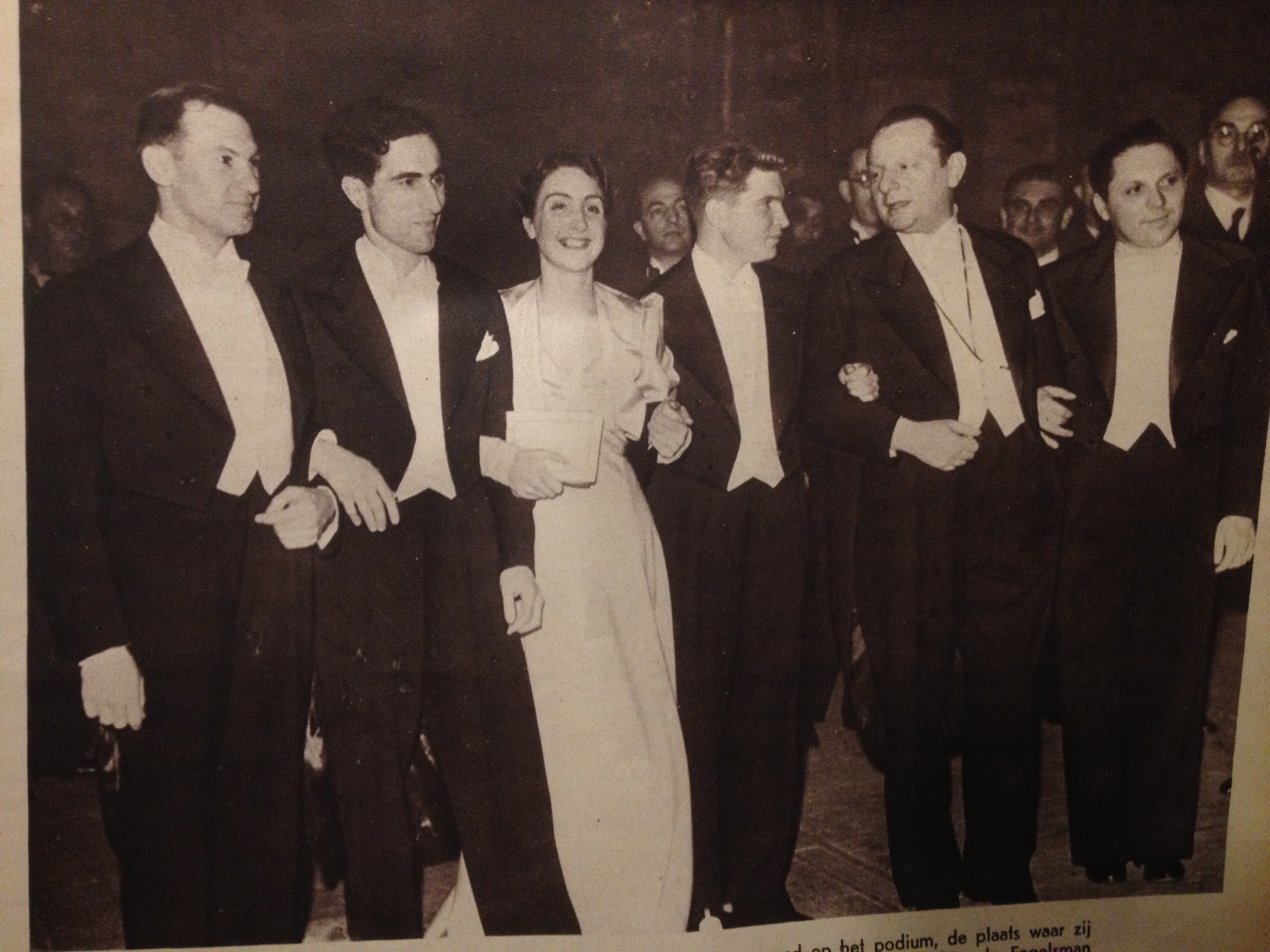
Moura Lympany surrounded by other winners at the 1938 Ysaÿe Piano Competition.

Moura Lympany at the Rasiguères Festival of Music and Wine, c. 1990

Dame Moura Lympany DBE (née Mary Gertrude Johnstone; 18 August 1916 – 28 March 2005) was an English concert pianist.

== Biography ==
She was born as Mary Gertrude Johnstone at Saltash, Cornwall. Her father was an army officer who had served in World War I and her mother originally taught her the piano. Mary was sent to a convent school in Belgium, where her musical talent was encouraged, and she went on to study at Liège, later winning a scholarship to the Royal Academy of Music in London, where she initially studied with Ambrose Coviello. She was made a Fellow of the Royal Academy of Music (FRAM) in 1948.

After auditioning for the conductor Basil Cameron, she made her concert debut with him at Harrogate in 1929, aged twelve, playing the G minor Concerto of Mendelssohn, the only concerto she had memorised up to that point. It was Cameron who suggested that she adopt a stage name for the concert and a Russian diminutive of the name Mary, Moura, along with an old spelling of her mother's maiden name, Limpenny, were chosen. She went on to further study in Vienna with Paul Weingarten, and in London with Mathilde Verne, who had been a pupil of Clara Schumann and Tobias Matthay. In 1935, she made her London debut at the Wigmore Hall, and in 1938 she came second to Emil Gilels in the Ysaÿe Piano Competition in Brussels. By the Second World War, she was one of the UK's most popular pianists.

On 13 April 1940 she gave the British premiere of Khachaturian's Piano Concerto in D-flat, one of the pieces most closely associated with her. She had been approached when Clifford Curzon pleaded he would not be able to learn it in time.

On 25 February 1945, with Adrian Boult, Lympany was the first British musician to perform in Paris after the Liberation. She performed Alan Rawsthorne's Piano Concerto No 1 and the Khachaturian Piano Concerto with Boult conducting the orchestra of the Conservatoire de Paris. Although around this time she performed the Rawsthorne with Boult several times, including with the BBC Symphony Orchestra in London on 12 October 1945, it was not until 1958 that her recording of it with Herbert Menges and the Philharmonia Orchestra was issued on His Master's Voice.

In 1944 she married Colin Defries, 32 years her senior, but they divorced in 1950. In 1951 she married Bennet Korn, an American television executive, and moved to the United States. Lympany very much wanted to start a family but she had two miscarriages, and a son who died shortly after birth. She and Bennet Korn divorced in 1961. Some years later she became a close friend of the British Prime Minister and amateur musician Edward Heath; mutual friends expressed hopes that they might marry, but this did not happen.

After the war she became more widely known, performing throughout Europe and in the US, Canada, Australia, New Zealand and India. When living in New York, Lympany continued her concert and recording career. Lympany was a Steinway pianist and participated in the Steinway Centenary Concert on 19 October 1953 in which ten Steinway pianists played a Polonaise by Chopin. The rehearsal of this piece was recorded and broadcast on Ed Sullivan's television show, at that time called Toast of the Town. Lympany also gave a recital at Carnegie Hall on 20 November 1957, for which tickets sold for 75c to $1.50. The flyer announcing her appearance contains a quote from the Los Angeles Herald & Express: "Since the days of Clara Schumann and Teresa Carreño, there have been few women pianists who could be counted among the great. Last night Moura Lympany gave evidence of possessing qualities which place her high among her historic colleagues."

In 1969 Lympany was diagnosed with breast cancer and her left breast was removed. Three months after the operation she performed Prokofiev's Piano Concerto No. 4 for the Left Hand at the Royal Festival Hall, London. She later had a second mastectomy but continued working and gained renewed popularity. In 1979, fifty years after making her debut, she performed at the Royal Festival Hall for Charles, Prince of Wales. That year she was appointed a Commander of the Order of the British Empire (CBE).

In 1981 she established the annual Rasiguères Festival of Music and Wine, near Perpignan, France (for which the Manchester Camerata was resident orchestra), which ran for 10 years and also assisted Prince Louis de Polignac to establish, in 1986, the Festival des Sept Chapelles in Guidel, Brittany. From the mid-1980s she was based in Monaco. Moura - Her Autobiography, written with her cousin, author Margot Strickland, was published by Peter Owen in 1991. In 1992 she was made a Dame Commander of the Order of the British Empire (DBE).

She received honours from the Belgian and French governments. One of Lympany's last public functions was as a juror for the Ninth Van Cliburn International Piano Competition held in Texas in May/June 1993.

== Death ==
Dame Moura Lympany died in Gorbio near Menton, France, in 2005, aged 88. Her archive was deposited in the International Piano Archives at the University of Maryland, College Park.

== Legacy ==
A succession of reissues of Lympany archive recordings has contributed to both maintaining her reputation and introducing her to post-LP generations including CDs issued by Dutton (Mozart K.414 and K.467), Ivory Classics (Mendelssohn, Litolff, Liszt), Olympia (Rachmaninoff and Prokofiev), Pristine Audio (Saint-Saëns Piano Concerto No. 2), Eloquence (Rachmaninov Preludes recorded 1951–2) and Documents (10 CD boxed set of all Lympany's recordings 1951–1961).

== Notable recordings ==
- Brahms, Intermezzi (EMI)
- Beethoven, Piano Concerto No 5 (Emperor), Stadium Concerts S.O. Cond. Thomas Scherman (1957)
- Chopin, The Complete Nocturnes (Angel)
- Chopin, 24 Preludes, Op. 28 (Erato)
- Khachaturian, Piano Concerto (Decca)
- Prokofiev, Piano Concerto No. 1 (Angel)
- Prokofiev, Piano Concerto No. 3 (Decca)
- Rachmaninoff, Piano Concerto No. 1 (Angel)
- Rachmaninoff, Piano Concerto No. 2 (His Master's Voice)
- Rachmaninoff, Piano Concerto No. 3 (Decca)
- Rachmaninoff, 24 Preludes (Erato) This (1994) was her third recording of the set. Her first and the first full set ever recorded was recorded from 1941 to 1945 for Decca. Her second recording of the full set was for Decca in 1951, later reissued on vinyl, then Ace of Clubs and by Everest Records.
- Alan Rawsthorne, Piano Concerto No. 1 (His Master's Voice)
- Saint-Saëns, Piano Concerto No. 2 in G minor, London Philharmonic Orchestra, conducted by Jean Martinon. (Decca 1951) (Pristine Audio)
- Schubert, Piano Quintet in A "The Trout" – with principals of the London Symphony Orchestra (EMI)
- Litolff, Concerto Symphonique No. 4 in D minor (Ivory Classics)
