= Ambrose Coviello =

English pianist, teacher and examiner

Ambrose Coviello (30 January 1887 - 31 January 1950) was an English pianist, teacher and examiner, of Italian extraction. He taught at the Royal Academy of Music for thirty years following World War 1.

== Early life and wartime ==
Born in Brixton, South London, Coviello was the son of two music teachers: his father Nicola was born in Italy. He studied with Oscar Beringer, Frederick Corder, Mathilde Verne and Paul Weingarten at the Royal Academy of Music, where he gained the Thalberg scholarship and Macfarran gold medal. He was appointed as a professor at the Academy in 1913, but then came World War One, during which he served with the 28th London Regiment (Artists’ Rifles), rising to the rank of Corporal. He received a DCM on 26th August 1918.

== Royal Academy of Music ==
Coviello was demobilised in 1920 and returned to teaching piano at the Academy, where he stayed for the rest of his life. A colleague there was Tobias Matthay. His pupils included Cyril Stanley Christopher (1897-1979), Joan Hall Craggs (1921-2006), Dorothy Parke and Moura Lympany. Coviello published Difficulties of Beethoven Pianoforte Sonatas (OUP, 1935), Foundations of Pianoforte Technique: Co-ordination Exercises (OUP, 1946), and (following Tobias Matthay's death in December 1945) What Matthay Meant. His Musical and Technical Teachings Clearly Explained and Self-Indexed (Boswell, 1948). He contributed articles to Music Student (1920) and Monthly Musical Record (1921-22). He was also an occasional composer, of songs and piano pieces.

== Personal life ==
Coviello died at the Academy in Marylebone, aged 63. His address (from 1930) was 84 Lowlands Road, Harrow. He married Evelyn Ursula Wadia (1896-1974) in April 1918, and there were three sons (including the artist Peter Coviello, 1930-2005) and one daughter.
