= Igor Lovchinsky =

Russian pianist (born 1984)

- Игорь Ловчинский
- Born: Kazan, Russia
- Education: Kazan Special Music School for Gifted Children, Juilliard School
- Occupation: Pianist

Igor Lovchinsky (Russian: Игорь Ловчинский) is a Russian-American classical pianist.

== Performing and recording career ==
Lovchinsky was born in Kazan, Russia and studied at the Kazan Special Music School for Gifted Children. In 2003, Lovchinsky entered the Juilliard School in New York on full scholarship, where he studied under Jerome Lowenthal.

As soloist, Lovchinsky has given recitals across the United States and internationally, including performances at Carnegie Hall, the John F. Kennedy Center for the Performing Arts and the Phillips Collection. Lovchinsky has performed with the Indianapolis Symphony Orchestra, the Columbus Symphony Orchestra, the Minnesota Sinfonia, the Indianapolis Chamber Orchestra, the Midcoast Symphony Orchestra, and others. His performance of Chopin's Concerto in E minor with the Connecticut Virtuosi Chamber Orchestra in 2004 was broadcast live on WQXR radio in New York. In 2007, in collaboration with American pianist Earl Wild, Lovchinsky recorded his debut album on the Ivory Classics label, featuring music of Chopin, Scriabin and Wild's transcriptions of Gershwin songs. The record received positive reviews from Gramophone Magazine, Germany's Piano Magazine, MusicWeb International Record Review and was voted one of the top classical recordings of 2008 by Time Out.

In addition to music, Lovchinsky holds a Ph.D. in Physics from Harvard University where his doctoral advisor was Mikhail Lukin. He has published numerous scientific articles in nanotechnology, quantum computing and high-energy astrophysics in leading scientific journals.

== Awards ==
Lovchinsky is a laureate of the National Chopin Piano Competition, the Eastman International Piano Competition and the Kosciuszko Foundation Chopin Piano Competition.
