= Piano Concerto in D-flat major =

Piano Concerto in D-flat major may refer to:

- Piano Concerto No. 1 (Prokofiev)
- Piano Concerto (Khachaturian)
