= Piano Concerto No. 1 (Scharwenka) =

Piano concerto

Piano Concerto
- No. 1
- by Xaver Scharwenka
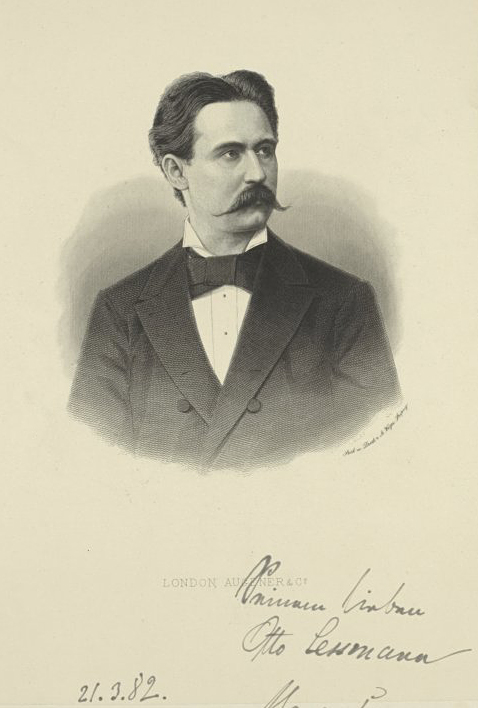
- Scharwenka in 1882
- Opus: 32
- Composed: 1876
- Dedication: Franz Liszt
- Performed: 14 April 1875: Berlin
- Duration: 30 minutes
- Movements: 3

The Piano Concerto No. 1 in B♭ minor, Op. 32, is a concerto for piano and orchestra completed by Xaver Scharwenka in 1876. The first performance was given on 14 April 1875 by the composer at the piano, under Julius Stern's direction. The work is dedicated to Franz Liszt.

== Structure ==
The concerto is scored in three movements. It is one of the only concertos to present three Allegro movements consecutively.

1. Allegro patetico - Adagio (average performance time: 10–12 mins)
2. Allegro assai (7–8 mins)
3. Allegro non tanto (10–12 mins)

A typical performance lasts around 28 to 33 minutes.

The first movement opens with a short tutti in fortissimo, directly announcing part of the thematic material that will be developed over the course of the movement. The piano quickly enters, cutting short the orchestral overture without a complete statement of the two themes as would be expected in a conventional concerto first movement. In fact, more than a conflict between two contrasting themes as is typical of pieces in sonata form up to the 19th century, the concerto is a development on multiple thematic ideas, with lyrical and introverted moments interspersed with virtuosic bravura reminiscent of the compositional style of Franz Liszt, the piece's dedicatee, known for his outstanding pianistic skill. Another unconventional feature is the interruption of the development section by a wistful Adagio, the only slow passage of the entire concerto. These ideas recall the pieces' origins as a fantasia for solo piano.

The second movement, a Scherzo in the style brillant recalling Hummel and Chopin, shows a different character to the reflective first movement by its contrastingly extroverted writing, in the key of G♭ major.

The finale opens with a mysterious orchestral opening followed by a solo discourse, with allusions to the first movement's themes. Yet again, the work's origins as a fantasia are recalled by Scharwenka's quasi-improvisational approach in pianistic writing. A Maestoso cadenza once again reintroduces the work's opening theme, before the concerto concludes with a highly virtuosic and dramatic coda, ending in the original key of B♭ minor.

== Instrumentation ==
The work is scored for solo piano and orchestra, with two flutes doubling as piccolo, two oboes, two clarinets (in B♭), two bassoons, two horns (in F), two trumpets (in F), three trombones, timpani, and strings.

== Composition ==
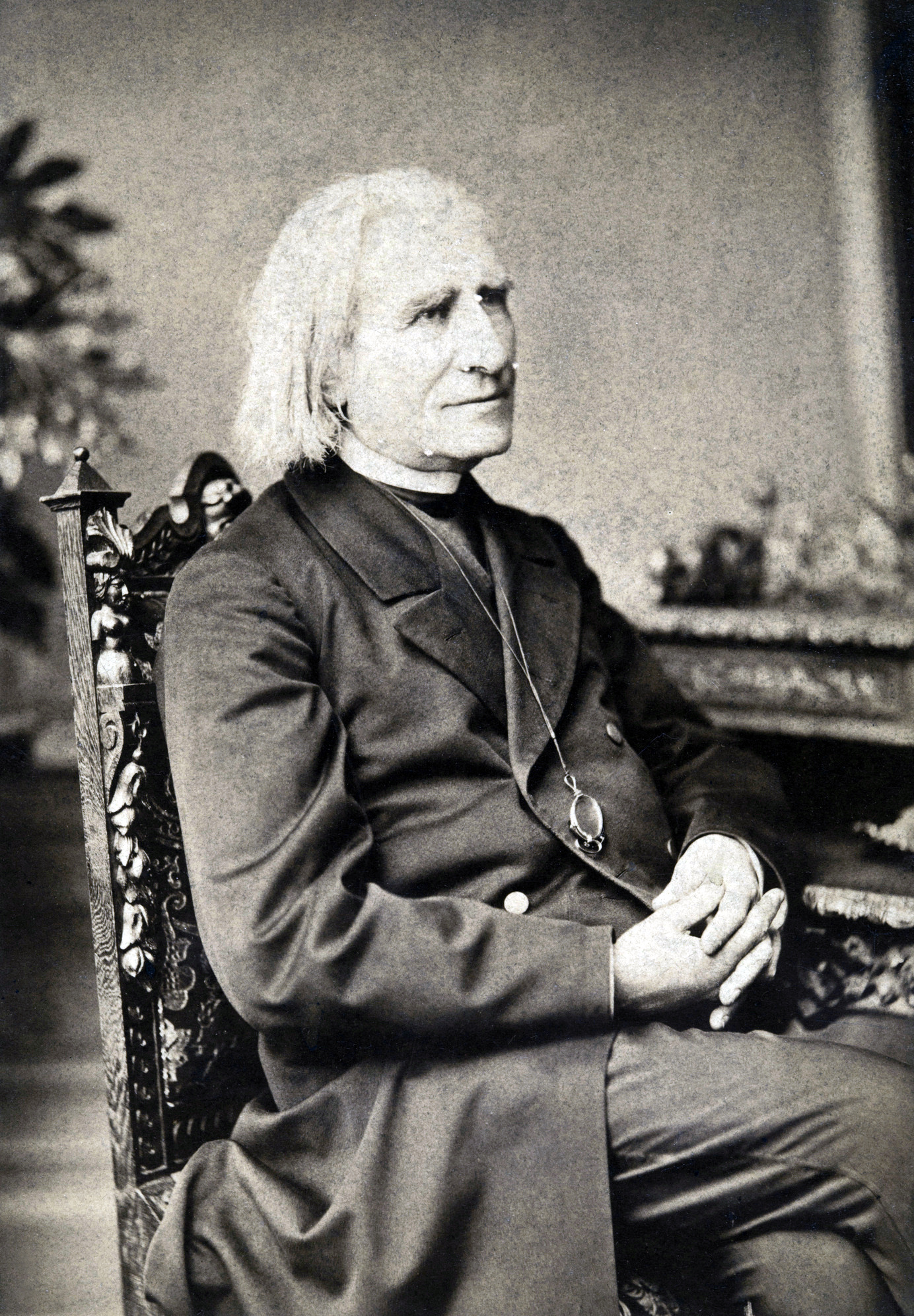
Liszt in 1876

The path that led the concerto to its final form is long and complex, dotted with many revisions. The concerto was written originally as a Fantasy in two movements for solo piano, which Scharwenka completed in 1869. The work's structure and content reflects these origins. The Fantasia was originally rejected by Breitkopf & Härtel, who published a collection of short pieces by the composer instead. Scharwenka soon returned to this work, in 1873, to enlargen, rework and orchestrate it.

In April 1875, the concerto's first performance is given in the Berlin Reichenhall Theater, under Julis Stern's direction. The concert, however, left Scharwenka unsatisfied with the work's structure. According to the composer himself:

I played my B flat minor Concerto for the first time with orchestra. […] The joyful bliss of young motherhood cannot be greater nor more sublime than that which comes from the secret darkness of one's own soul, is pressed to the light and now becomes audibly evident. I was completely satisfied with the instrumentation, yet the form of the Concerto still did not satisfy me. Once again, I tinkered with the piece and finally gave it the shape in which it would soon appear in print.

Once modified, the composition finally reached its definite three-movement structure. The final version's premiere was given in spring 1877, in Bremen. In the summer of the same year, Scharwenka visited Franz Liszt in Weimar, and played the concerto for him; the latter received it warmly and accepted the dedication, calling the piece "excellent" and even recommending it for performance at the German Musical Society in Hanover. Liszt performed the concerto himself in 1877.

== Critical reception and posterity ==
The concerto brought Scharwenka great renown, and was quite popular in the last quarter of the century. According to the composer, the concerto "opened up doors to both me and the work to the great concert halls of the world". The work had its premieres in London by Edward Dannreuther in 1877 and in New York, by Konstantin von Sternberg, in 1880. Dannreuther may have played the piece at the Crystal Palace; The Musical Times said the composition showed "true musical feeling, more than average originality, and an excellent command of the resources of the orchestra."

Scharwenka himself often performed this concerto internationally, and to great success, in programs that also included Beethoven's Emperor Concerto. Hans von Bülow wrote: "The excellent work, which was uniformly charming, often interesting and original, flowed naturally and possessed of skilful form, almost unintentionally so. It shares the genuinely pianistic qualities of Chopin's works, yet surpasses Chopin's in its splendid orchestration." Tchaikovsky had a high opinion of the concerto, recalling that ‘it stood out from the grey mediocrity’ of much that was then being written at the time.

In January 1891, the Behr Brothers sponsored an American tour for Scharwenka, in which the pianist performed his own piano concertos. The first concerto particularly stuck with the American public, remaining in standard repertoire until Rachmaninoff's piano concertos replaced it. However, the Behr pianos sparked a few negative reviews of Scharwenka's American debut of the First Piano Concerto, Henry Theophilus Finck claiming the concerto "was utterly marred by the wretched Behr piano". In Scharwenka's 1892 American tour, he used a Knabe piano (by then the partnership with the Behr Brothers was mutually broke off), before switching to Steinway.

Gustav Mahler's only ever public appearance as a soloist was for a performance of the first movement from this concerto on October 20, 1877, in Vienna.

In 1921, music critic H.H. Bellamann asserted that Schwarenka's piano concertos "fail to intrigue the interest".

Renowned pianists such as Konstantin von Sternberg, Emil von Sauer, Moritz Rosenthal and Eugen d’Albert had this concerto in their repertoire. But over the first half of the 20th century, the work fell largely into oblivion, and went missing for many decades, until Earl Wild revived the concerto in 1968 by making the first recording of it, with the Boston Symphony Orchestra. During his student years, Wild had learned the concerto under his teacher, Selmar Janson, Scharwenka's own student. When, over 40 years later, Erich Leinsdorf asked Wild to record the concerto, he reportedly said "I've been waiting by the phone for forty years for someone to ask me to play this". Since the 1990s, the concerto has gained back some relative popularity, while never returning to its 19th-century fame. Notably, Marc-André Hamelin has brought public attention to the piece with his 2005 recording of the work as part of the Hyperion "The Romantic Piano Concerto" series.

== Recordings ==
Year	Pianist	Orchestra	Conductor	Comments
1968	Earl Wild	Boston Symphony Orchestra	Erich Leinsdorf	
1991	Seta Tanyel	The Philharmonia	Yuri Simonov	Recorded alongside Chopin's Concerto No. 1 in an album for Collins Classics.
2001	Laurence Jeanningros	Czech National Symphony Orchestra	Paul Freeman	Part of an album for Centaur grouping Scharwenka's first two piano concertos.
2005	Marc-André Hamelin	BBC Scottish Symphony Orchestra	Michael Stern	This recording appeared in Volume 38 of Hyperion's "The Romantic Piano Concerto", alongside Rubinstein's Fourth Concerto.
2014	Alexander Markovich	Estonian National Symphony Orchestra	Neeme Järvi	Part of the album "Scharwenka: Complete Piano Concertos" for Chandos.
2024	Jonathan Powell	Poznań Philharmonic	Łukasz Borowicz	cpo
