= Ivory Classics =

American classical music record label

Ivory Classics is an American classical music record label governed by the Ivory Classics Foundation. The purpose of this foundation, which was established in 1998, is to promote, through charitable and benevolent activities, an appreciation for the art of the piano through its work with the premier audiophile piano label.

Artists having recorded for Ivory Classics include, among others, Earl Wild, Shura Cherkassky, Ann Schein Carlyss, Eric Himy, Moura Lympany, and Igor Lovchinsky.
