= Colin Defries =

English racing driver and pilot

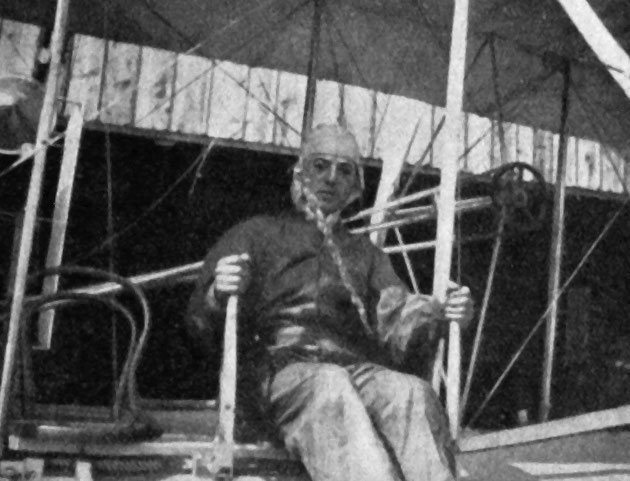
Colin Defries in the pilot's seat of his Wright machine.

Colin Defries (1884–1963) was an English racing driver and pilot who made his first powered aeroplane flight over Australia on 9 December 1909. He piloted a Wright Model A airplane approximately 100 yards (91 m), although the flight was not officially recognised. Defries managed to fly at height of about 15 ft (5 m) at a speed of about 36 mph. He then lost control and crashed, that led to the opinion that no controlled flight was achieved. With the Aerial League and a newspaper denying that the flight had occurred at all, Defries made a second attempt on 18 December. Finally, his mechanic, R. C. Banks, made an attempt of his own on 1 March 1910, and crashed the plane again.

Wing Commander Harry Cobby wrote in Aircraft in March 1938 that "the first aeroplane flight in the Southern Hemisphere was made in 1909 by Mr Colin Defries, a Londoner, at Victoria Park Racecourse, Sydney, in a Wilbur Wright aeroplane". Colin Defries was a trained pilot, having learnt to fly in Cannes, France. By modern standards his flight time was minimal, but in 1909 he had enough experience to become an instructor. He took it off, maintained straight and level flight, albeit briefly, and landed safely, on his first flight. His crash landing on his second flight demonstrated what a momentary lack of attention could cause while flying a Wright Model A.

Despite rival claims for aviators Fred Custance and Harry Houdini, whose historic flight which demonstrated turns and cirucits and was in fact certified by the Aerial League of Australia as the first, it is claimed by some Australian historians that the definition of flight established by the Gorell Committee on behalf of the Aero Club of Great Britain dictates the acceptance of a flight or its rejection, therefore giving Colin Defries credit as the first to make an aeroplane flight.

However, a wider examination of the RAC's Gorell Committee's rejection of the 1908 Flight by A.V.Roe as the "first flight in Britain" questions that assessment: "The committee does not deny that Mr. Roe rose from the ground during his 1908 experiments, but holds that the machine was making a hop rather than a free, controlled flight." - The RAC's Gorell Committee instead recognised Frenchman J. T. C Moore-Brabazon, as being the first to demonstrate powered controlled flight for "flying a circular mile on an all- English-mode machine in 1909".

The Gorell Committee was never asked to assess the Defries claims, but the parallels with the Defries and Houdini flights are obvious.

Defries left Australia soon after and apparently made no subsequent personal claims or memoirs about the December 1909 flight.

His Mechanic Ralph Banks took the aircraft to Victoria where he crashed it at Diggers Rest.

The owner of the aircraft, Lawrence Adamson, "dumped it at sea" in order to avoid paying customs duties. Most of the plane was lost, although the engine and two propellers were later salvaged. The engine now belongs to Museum Victoria, where it is regarded by the handler, David Crotty, as "one of the most significant aeronautical artefacts" in the collection.

== Personal ==
In 1940 Defries married the concert pianist Moura Lympany, a woman 32 years his junior. They divorced in 1950.

== See also ==
- Harry Houdini: The Aviator — Houdini's flight at Diggers Rest, Friday, 18 March 1910.
