= Selmar Janson =

Selmar Janson (27 May 1881 – 19 November 1960) was a German-born American pianist and teacher, whose most prominent student was Earl Wild. His surname is also seen as Jansen.

== Biography ==
Selmar Janson was born in eastern Prussia in 1881, the son of Herman Janson. He began to play the piano at age 4, and gave his first concert in Berlin at age 8.

His teachers included Sally Liebling, Eugen d'Albert, Xaver Scharwenka, Hans Pfitzner and Philipp Rüfer (1844–1919).

He toured Germany with great success, and repeated this in many concerts after coming to the United States. In a notice in the Brownsville Daily Herald (Brownsville, Texas) of 21 November 1908, Janson, whose visit there was under negotiation, was described (perhaps somewhat hyperbolically) as "one of the most famous pianists and composers in the world today, being classed in the same rank with Paderewski and Joseph Hoffmann". At that time he was described as a German pianist.

That same year he became the head of a music school in Wichita, Kansas, at age 26. He took up residence in Pittsburgh in early 1911, and made a favourable impression there. In December 1912 he recorded several piano rolls for the QRS Company. In 1914 he appeared as soloist under the baton of Walter Damrosch in Pittsburgh.

Selmar Janson taught at the Carnegie Institute of Technology in Pittsburgh for many years. By far his most prominent and successful student there was Earl Wild, who studied with him from the age of 12. Under Janson, Wild learned Xaver Scharwenka's Piano Concerto No. 1 in B-flat minor, which Janson had studied directly with the composer, his own teacher. When, over 40 years later, Erich Leinsdorf asked Wild to record the concerto, he was able to say "I've been waiting by the phone for forty years for someone to ask me to play this".

Other students of Janson's included Louis Crowder (1907–1998), Paul Scherr, Leonard Sharrow, Ruth Scott Clark (1912–2009), and Annette Roussel-Pesche (1914–1997; whose other teachers included Alfred Cortot, Nadia Boulanger, Pierre Fournier and Georges Dandelot). Margaret H. Leisering (1911–1996)

In around 1935, Janson offered the seven-year-old Byron Janis a scholarship, but Janis's mother insisted, over the objections of the rest of the family, many of whom lived in Pittsburgh, that he be sent to New York to study with Adele Marcus and the Lhévinnes.

In addition to teaching, he also participated in chamber music concerts in a piano trio known as the Brahms Trio.

Janson married Julia A. Elliot (1907–1975) and they had a child. He died in 1960, aged 79.
