= Xaver Scharwenka =

German pianist and composer (1850–1924)

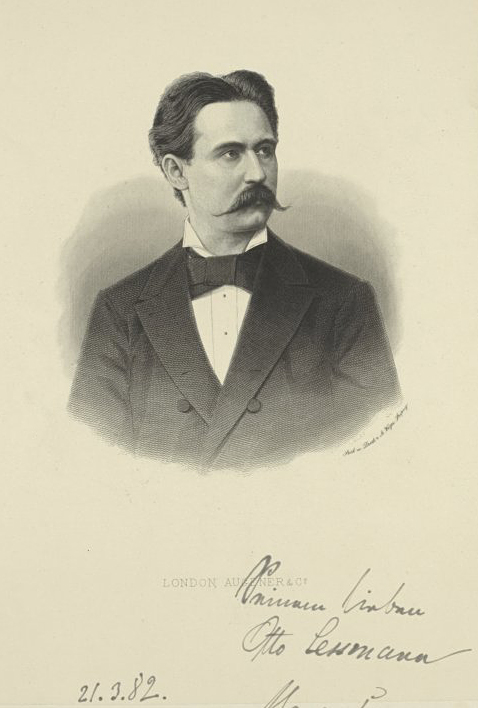
- Scharwenka in 1882
- Born: 6 January 1850; Samter, Prussia
- Died: 8 December 1924 (aged 74); Berlin, Germany
- Occupations: Pianist; Composer

Theophil Franz Xaver Scharwenka (6 January 1850 – 8 December 1924) was a German pianist, composer and teacher of Polish descent. He was the brother of Ludwig Philipp Scharwenka (1847–1917), who was also a composer and teacher of music.

== Life and career ==
Scharwenka was born in 1850 in Samter, Prussia (Polish: Szamotuły; until 1793 and since 1919 part of Poland). His paternal ancestors originally came from Prague, then moved to Frankfurt on the Oder in 1696 - probably for reasons of faith - and settled thereafter in Samter. His father, August Wilhelm, was a gifted master-builder but decidedly did not have an ear for music. His mother, née Golisch, was an ethnic Pole from a family of some means, who was musically inclined and early on instilled in her children a love of music. Although he began learning to play the piano by ear when he was 3, Scharwenka did not start formal music studies until he was 15, when his family moved to Berlin and he enrolled at the Akademie der Tonkunst. Under Theodor Kullak, his pianistic skills developed rapidly, and he made his debut at the Singakademie in 1869. He taught at the academy until entering military service in 1873. Upon his discharge in 1874, Scharwenka began touring as a concert pianist. Praised for the beauty of his tone, he became a renowned interpreter of the music of Frédéric Chopin.

In 1881 Scharwenka organized a successful annual series of chamber and solo concerts at the Singakademie in conjunction with Gustav Holländer and Heinrich Grünfeld. That October he founded his own music school in Berlin. In 1886, he conducted the first in a series of orchestral concerts devoted to the music of Hector Berlioz, Franz Liszt and Ludwig van Beethoven while continuing to tour extensively and play his works in collaboration with other artists such as the conductor Hans Richter and the violinist Joseph Joachim. This triple role as pianist, composer and educator would occupy Scharwenka for the rest of his career.

In 1891, Scharwenka made his first tour of America. Deciding to emigrate, he opened a New York branch of his Scharwenka Music School. In 1893 the Berlin Scharwenka Conservatory was united with the Klindworth Conservatory, and in 1898 he returned there as Director, from New York. In 1914, with W. Petzet, he opened a School of Music with a piano teachers' seminary attached.

Among pianists who received some instruction from him were José Vianna da Motta, Fridtjof Backer-Grøndahl and Selmar Janson. See: List of music students by teacher: R to S#Xaver Scharwenka. His Methodik des Klavierspiels was published in Leipzig in 1907.

Sometime in the very early 1900s he conducted Felix Mendelssohn's G minor Concerto, at which the composer and pianist Marthe Servine made her debut.

Scharwenka made several recordings for Columbia Records in 1910 and 1913, including works of his own, as well as pieces by Chopin, Mendelssohn, Weber and Liszt: his account of Chopin's Fantaisie-Impromptu (Op. posth. 66) is admired. His playing is also preserved on Welte-Mignon and Hupfeld piano rolls, including the Chopin A♭ Waltz, Op 42, and the F minor Fantaisie (Op. 49), his performance of which was famous. Some of his Hupfeld rolls were also converted for the American Ampico reproducing piano.

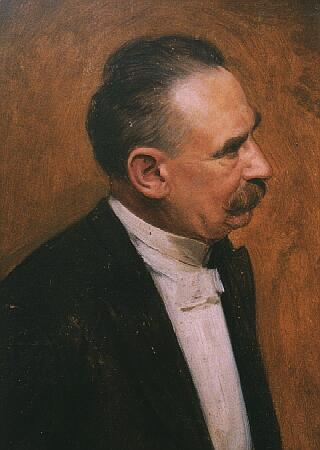
Portrait by Anton von Werner

== Music ==
Scharwenka's own compositions include an opera (Mataswintha), a symphony, four piano concertos, chamber music (all with piano part) and numerous piano pieces; his piano idiom somewhat resembles Schumann and Rachmaninoff.

The four piano concertos are substantial works. The first, in B♭ minor, Op. 32, was completed in 1874 and premiered the following year. It was originally written as a solo piano fantasy, but Scharwenka was dissatisfied, and reworked it with orchestra into this form. Franz Liszt accepted the dedication and performed it in Berlin. Its first recording was made in 1968 with Earl Wild and the Boston Symphony Orchestra under Erich Leinsdorf. Wild had learned the concerto as a boy under Selmar Janson, who had studied it directly with the composer. When Leinsdorf asked Wild to record the concerto, he was able to say "I've been waiting by the phone for forty years for someone to ask me to play this".

The fourth concerto, in F minor, Op. 82 (1908), was premiered on 18 October 1908 in the Beethovensaal, Berlin, with Scharwenka's student Martha Siebold as the soloist and the composer himself conducting.

Scharwenka's works were neglected for some years after his death; however, his Polish Dance No. 1 in E♭ minor, Op. 3, No. 1, remained popular. Since the mid-1990s, however, interest in his music has been rekindled, and recordings of most of his works are now commercially available.

The recording of his Fourth Piano Concerto played by Stephen Hough with the City of Birmingham Symphony Orchestra conducted by Lawrence Foster was voted Record of the Year by the British music magazine Gramophone in 1996. His Symphony in C minor, Op. 60, received its CD premiere in 2004.

== Selected works ==
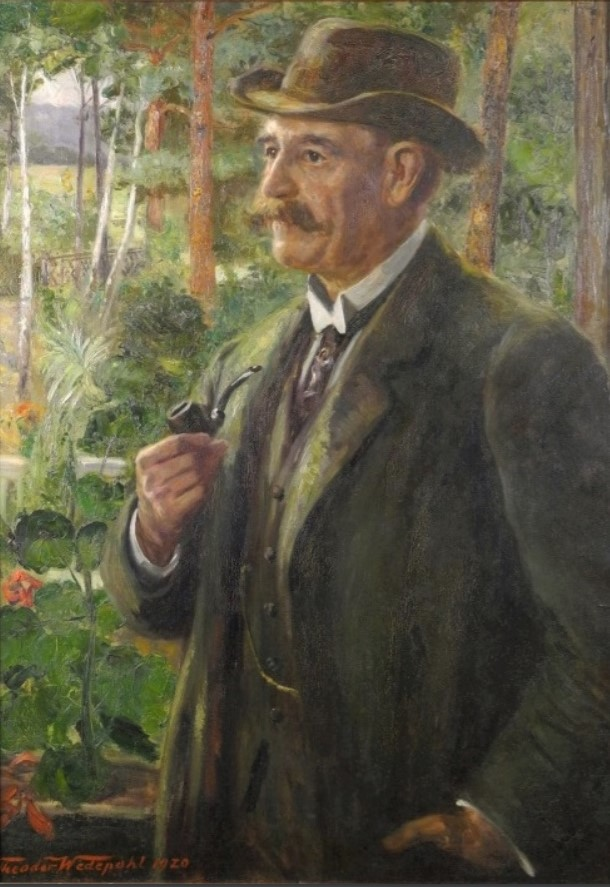
Portrait by Theodor Wedepohl (1920)

=== Concertos ===
- Piano Concerto No. 1 in B♭ minor, Op. 32 (1876)
- Piano Concerto No. 2 in C minor, Op. 56 (1881)
- Piano Concerto No. 3 in C♯ minor, Op. 80 (1889)
- Piano Concerto No. 4 in F minor, Op. 82 (1908)

=== Orchestral ===
- Overture in C minor, ScharWV 123 (1869)
- Andante religioso, Op. 46a/ScharWV 120, the composer's arrangement of the Cello Sonata (1881)
- Symphony in C minor, Op. 60/ScharWV 121 (1885)

=== Opera ===
- Mataswintha, ScharWV 150 (1896), opera in 3 acts with libretto by Ernst Koppel after Felix Dahn

=== Chamber music ===
- Piano Trio No. 1 in F♯ minor, Op. 1 (1868)
- Violin Sonata in D minor, Op. 2 (1868)
- Piano Quartet in F major, Op. 37 (1876-1877?)
- Cello Sonata in E minor, Op. 46 (1877)
- Piano Trio No. 2 in A minor, Op. 45 (1878)
- Serenade for violin and piano, Op. 70 (1895)

=== Piano ===
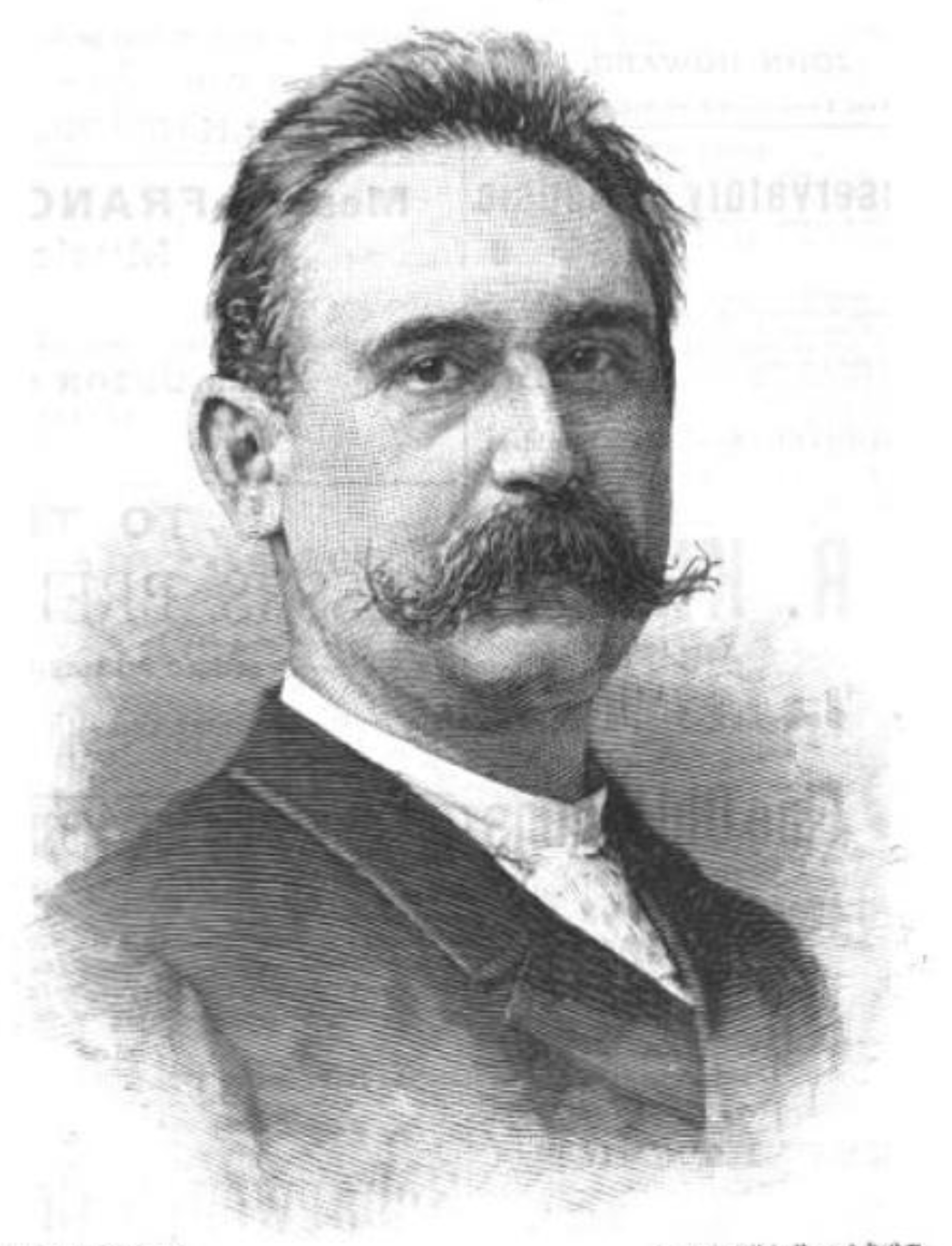
1891 sketch of Xaver Scharwenka

- 5 Polish Dances, Op. 3
- Scherzo in G major, Op. 4
- Stories at the Piano, Op. 5
- Piano Sonata No. 1 in C♯ minor, Op. 6 (1872)
- Polonaise in C♯ minor, Op. 12
- Barcarolle in E minor, Op. 14
- Impromptu in D major, Op. 17
- 2 Piano Pieces, Op. 22: Novelette, Melodie
- Valse-Caprice in A major, Op. 31
- Piano Sonata No. 2 in E♭ major, Op. 36 (1878)
- Dance Suites, Op. 41
- Polonaise, Op. 42
- Polish Dances, Op. 47
- Theme and Variations, Op. 48
- 4 Polish Dances, Op. 58: Moderato, Lento, Allegro non tanto, Moderato
- Eglantine Waltz, Op. 84
- 3 Piano Pieces, Op. 86: Nocturne, Serenade, Maerchen
- Ballade in B minor, Op. 8

== Selected discography ==
- Piano Concerto No. 1 in B-flat minor, Op. 32 played by Earl Wild with the Boston Symphony Orchestra conducted by Erich Leinsdorf. Recorded in 1969. (As LP, RCA Red Seal SB 6815.) CD also contains Paderewski's Piano Concerto and Balakirev's Fantasia on Themes by Glinka (Elan Recordings no. 22660).
- Piano Concerto No. 1 in B-flat minor, Op. 32 played by Marc-André Hamelin with the BBC Scottish Symphony Orchestra conducted by Michael Stern. Recorded in 2005. CD also contains Anton Rubinstein's Piano Concerto No. 4 (Hyperion Records no. 67508).
- Piano Concerto No. 1 in B-flat minor, Op. 32 played by Seta Tanyel with the Philharmonia Orchestra conducted by Yuri Simonov. CD also contains Chopin's Piano Concerto No. 1 with the same orchestra conducted by Carlo Rizzi. The recording was made for the now defunct label Collins Classics (No. 12632).
- Piano Concerto No. 2 in C minor, Op. 56 played by Michael Ponti with the Hamburg Symphony Orchestra conducted by Richard Kapp. Issued in 1971 as LP, VOX Candide STGBY 651. Also contains Scherzo Op. 4, Erzählung am Klavier No 2, Op. 5, Novelette Op. 22, No. 1, and Polonaise, Op 42.
- Piano Concerto No. 3 in C-sharp minor, Op. 80 played by Seta Tanyel with the Radio Philharmonie Hannover conducted by Tadeusz Strugała. Recorded in 1996. CD also contains Piano Concerto No. 2 (Hyperion no. 67365). This recording is a rerelease of a Collins Classics CD.
- Piano Concerto No. 4 in F minor, Op. 82 played by Stephen Hough with the City of Birmingham Symphony Orchestra conducted by Lawrence Foster. Recorded in 1995. CD also contains Emil von Sauer's Piano Concerto No. 1 (Hyperion no. 66790).
- Complete Piano Concertos played by Alexander Markovitch with the Estonian National Symphony Orchestra conducted by Neeme Järvi (Chandos CHAN 10814(2)) 2014.
- Symphony in C minor, Op. 60 (1885). Gävle Symphony Orchestra conducted by Christopher Fifield (Sterling 1060-2).
