= Dorothy Parke =

Musician and composer from Northern Ireland

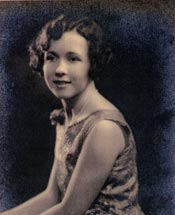

Background information
- Born: 29 July 1904; Derry, County Londonderry
- Died: 15 February 1990 (aged 85); Portrush, County Antrim
- Genres: Chamber music Choral music
- Spouse: Douglas Brown

Dorothy Parke (29 July 1904 – 15 February 1990) was a composer and music teacher from Northern Ireland, noted for children's works.

== Early life and education ==
Parke was born in 1904, at Dunfield Terrace in Derry. She studied piano with Ambrose Coviello, and composition with Paul Corder at the Royal Academy of Music in London (LRAM, 1929).

After completing her studies, she returned to Derry in 1930. Later that decade, she settled in Belfast, where she resided for most of her working life.

== Career ==
Between 1930 and 1960 Parke taught music in Belfast and worked as a composer. Among her pupils were Norma Burrowes, Derek Bell, Kenneth Montgomery and Marjorie Wright - all of whom had high regard for Parke.

Her husband, Douglas Brown, was a teacher and accomplished musician in his own right. Parke and Brown frequently performed concerts as a piano duo. She also performed with fellow Belfast musicians Howard Ferguson and Havelock Nelson.

Parke taught in Belfast for fifty years, before eventually retiring to Portrush, County Antrim. She died in Portrush on 15 February 1990.

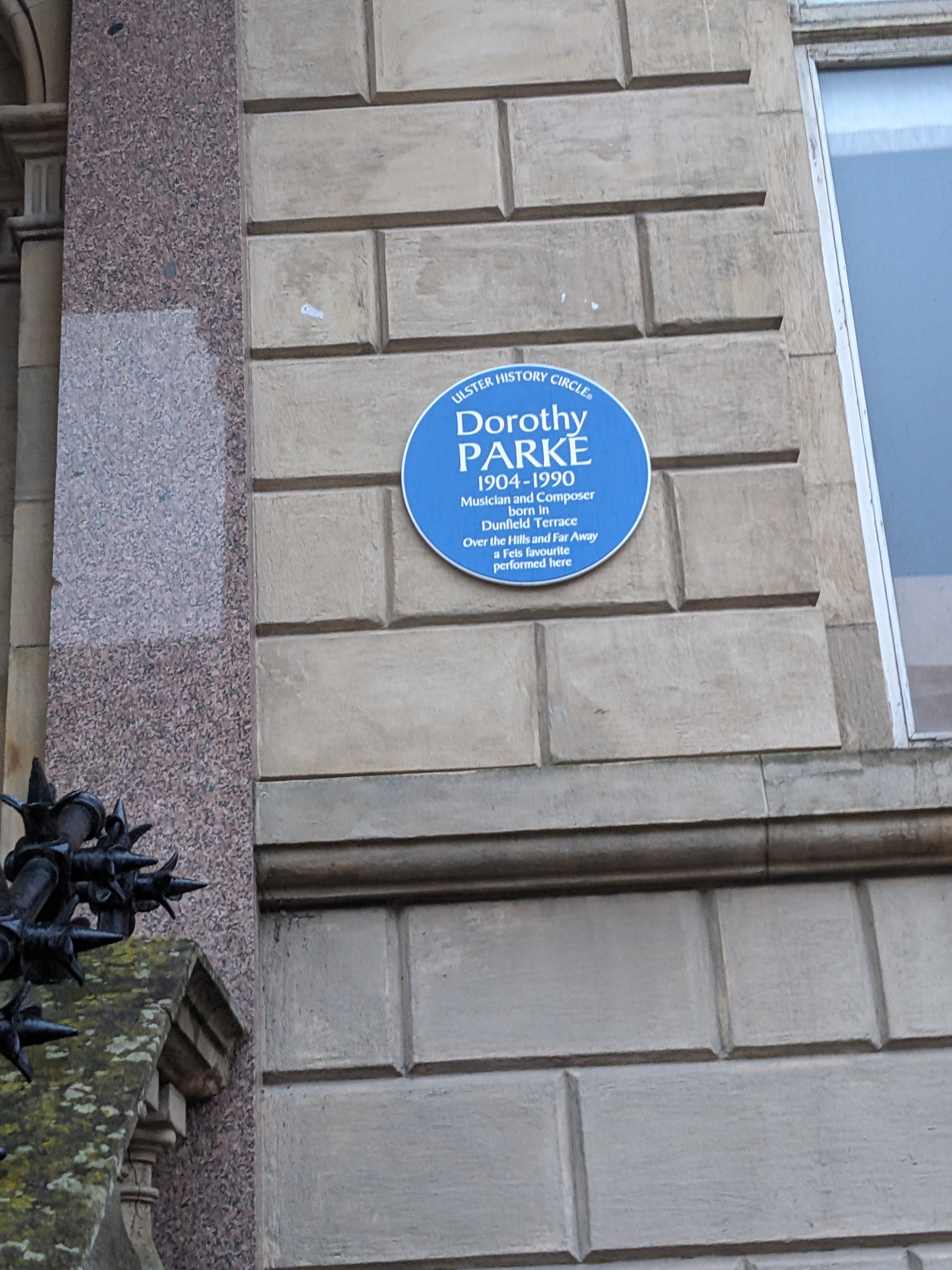
Her blue plaque in Derry

Parke is primarily known for her compositions for children, set to poems by Ulster poets. They have been described as "simple tunes with strong rhythms", and are still popular throughout Derry. During her lifetime, her music was performed over thirty times on RTÉ Radio and BBC Radio.

Parke wrote over 150 compositions - including songs and piano solos, choral and vocal music - though only a few are still performed today. She also composed a substantial amount of piano and chamber music, many of which remain largely unknown and overlooked.

Her compositional style has been compared to English composers Ralph Vaughan Williams and Herbert Howells; "very approachable but of a rather naïve simplicity and with ingenuous harmonies". Sarah Burn has praised the value of Parke's music:

Nevertheless, her music is distinctive and always effective; many of her choral and vocal settings in particular, archive a real poignancy and show considerable expressiveness. She did occasionally use a more advanced idiom, as in her choral settings of Chesterton and Stephens.

== Selected works ==
- St. Columba's Poem on Derry, solo song
- A Song of Good Courage, solo song
- The House and The Road, solo song
- The Road to Ballydare, solo song
- To The Sailors, solo song
- Like A Snowy Field (1951) choral miniature
- Wynkyn, Blynkyn and Nod (1949) choral miniature
- Wee Hughie
- Over The Hills and Far Away
- O Men From the Fields, choir song

== Awards and honours ==
Parke won composition prizes at the Royal Academy of Music and the Dublin Feis Ceoil. She also won the Londonderry Music Festival's Knockan Cup for composition, four years in a row.

== Legacy ==
A blue plaque commemorating Parke was unveiled at St Columb’s Hall by the Ulster History Circle on 15 February 2023 - the 33rd anniversary of her death.

== See also ==
See: List of music students by teacher: N to Q#Dorothy Parke.
