= Mieczysław Munz =

Polish-American pianist

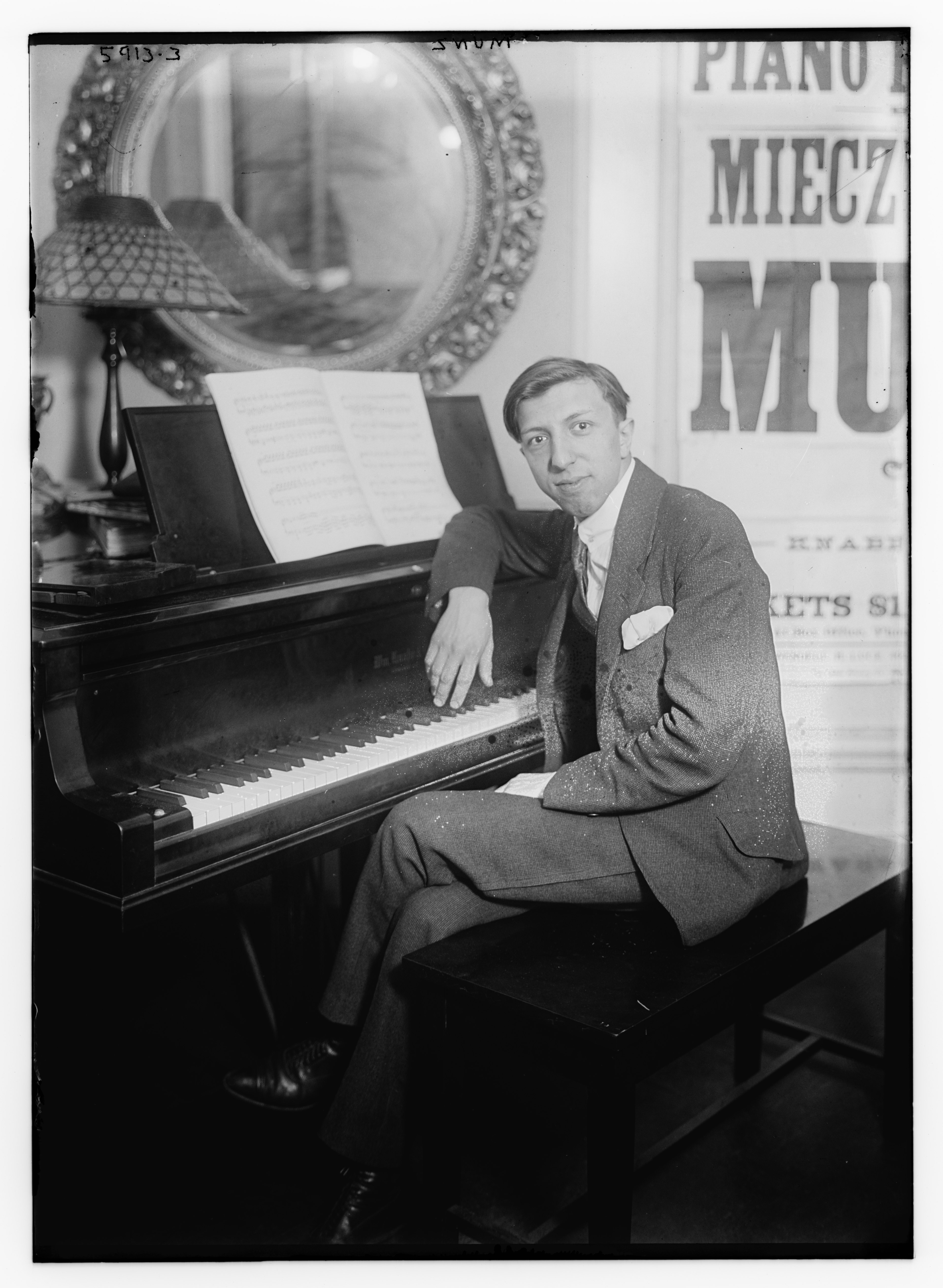
- Born: 31 October 1900; Kraków
- Died: 25 August 1976 (aged 75)
- Occupation: pianist

Mieczysław Munz (October 31, 1900, Kraków – August 25, 1976) was a Polish-American pianist.

Munz trained in Vienna and Berlin, with Ferruccio Busoni. He was a teacher of Emanuel Ax, Walter Hautzig, David Oei, Ann Schein, Virginia Reinecke, Adolovni Acosta, and Iravati M. Sudiarso.

He left concertizing in the early 1940s after developing physical problems with his right hand.

His ex-wife was Aniela (Nela) Młynarska (daughter of Emil Młynarski), who later married Arthur Rubinstein.

== Recordings ==
Americus Records, Inc. has issued a compact disc purporting to contain all extant recordings of Munz: The Art of Mieczyslaw Munz, AMR20021022. It includes Mozart's Piano Concerto In D Minor, K.466; Rachmaninoff's Rhapsody on a Theme of Paganini; and various short works, several being virtuoso transcriptions.
