= Eric Himy =

American pianist

Eric Himy is an American-born (August 16, 1958) classical pianist of French-Spanish-Moroccan descent.

== Life ==
Born in Brooklyn on August 16, 1958, Himy began piano studies at age six, giving his first concert at age 10. By age 7, he was accepted by master teacher Robert Vetlesen. At 12, he began his studies with Charles Crowder at the Preparatory Department of Music at American University. By age 15, Himy was guest soloist with the Baltimore Symphony Orchestra and at 19 he made his National Symphony Orchestra debut under Hugh Wolf. He has performed with numerous conductors including Russell Stanger, Kenneth Schermerhorn, and Antoni Wit, who was making his American debut. He has also replaced various ailing soloists in last minute substitutions, among them Pascal Roge and Alain Planes.

== Education ==
Himy studied music]] at the University of Maryland with Thomas Schumacher. He received a Master of Music degree from the Juilliard School in New York working with Adele Marcus (a disciple of Artur Schnabel and Josef Lhevinne) and Joseph Villa (a disciple of Olga Barabini and Claudio Arrau). He has taught at Princeton University, The University of Texas, The University of San Francisco, Portland State University, The University of Virginia and The University of Utah among others.

== Piano playing ==
Himy has performed all over the United States, Canada, South America and Europe.He has been heard most notably at the Kennedy Center, Carnegie Recital Hall, Lincoln Center, The Frick Collection, The Phillips Collection, Salle Cortot and Salle Gaveau in Paris, Salle Moliere in Lyon, Teatro Manoel in Malta and the Teatro Amazonas.

Himy commissioned the work "Gargoyles" from the American composer Lowell Liebermann and gave the world premiere at his debut recital in Lincoln Center Alice Tully Hall. "Gargoyles" went on to become a popular piano work which has been recorded and performed by many pianists including Stephen Hough and Yuja Wang who performed it in Carnegie Hall.

The New York Times described his playing as "flawlessly poised, elegant, and brilliant. Mr. Himy has a formidable technique, and he deploys a wide range of colorings."

In 2003, Classics Today wrote, "Precision, beauty, and surface polish characterize Eric Himy’s superb way with Ravel’s piano music." and the BBC Magazine wrote, "As for Miroirs, I have never heard the five pieces done better. The echo effects in ‘Oiseaux tristes’ are what you dream of, and the liquid quality of ‘Une barque sur l’océan’ invites you to listen over and over again. Even the passages of single-line melody in ‘Alborada’ have an indescribably exotic atmosphere in Himy's subtle moulding."

In 2017 Mr. Himy performed with the Washington Ballet in Justin Peck choreography Suite for Two Pianos by Philip Glass with pianist Glenn Sales.

In 2019, he performed the Guillaume Lekeu Violin Sonata in G with violinist Michael Guttman and trios with Jing Zhao cellist in Paris and at the Pietrasanta Music Festival in Italy with violinist Gilles Appap. Eric Himy will be performing at the 20th anniversary the 2026 Italian Pietrasanta in concerto Music Festival featuring many great artists such as Martha Argerich, Maxim Vengerov and many others.

== Selected discography ==
- Love & Desire in the Classics: CD compilation (Retro Music, 1991)
- Eric Himy – The Art of the Transcription for Piano (BNL, 1992)
- Krotenberg / Fraternité – Concerto piano op. 1 (DPV, 1993)
- Yves Ramette – Compositions pour piano (MMC, 2001)
- Compositions for Orchestra by Ramette, Stulen and Nrp (MMC, 2002)
- Eric Himy Plays Ravel (Ivory Classics, 2003)
- Gershwin, The Art of the Transcription (Centaur, 2004)
- Le Piano Imaginaire-Yves Ramette and Claude Debussy (2005)
- Homage to Schumann (Centaur, 2006)
- Homage to Mozart (Centaur, 2006)
- Homage to Debussy (Centaur, 2008)
- Homage to Liszt (Centaur, 2008)
- Homage to Chopin – 200th Anniversary CD (Wells Pianos, 2010)
- Homage to Chopin – 200th Anniversary CD-DVD (Big Notes Films, 2010)
- Gershwin in Paris CD-DVD (Big Notes Films, 2011)
- An Evening with Liszt – 200th Anniversary CD-DVD (Wells Pianos, 2011)

== Sources ==
- Howard Pollack George Gershwin His Life and his Work (2006) University of California Press
- Sophie Fuller Queer Episodes in Music and Modern Identity (2002) University of Illinois Press Excerpt – p. 176, index 77: Arcadi Volodos, Arcadi Volodos, Piano Transcriptions (Sony Classical...as well as Oldham's own transcriptions of Bach works; and Eric Himy, The Art of the Transcription for Piano (recorded 1992 BNL / Auvidis)
- Peter Harrison "Singing: Personal and performance values in training" (2013) Dunedin Academic Press Ltd
- Earl Wild – Ivory Classics – "Doo-Dah" Variations for Piano and Orchestra – p. 6
