= Ann Schein Carlyss =

American pianist

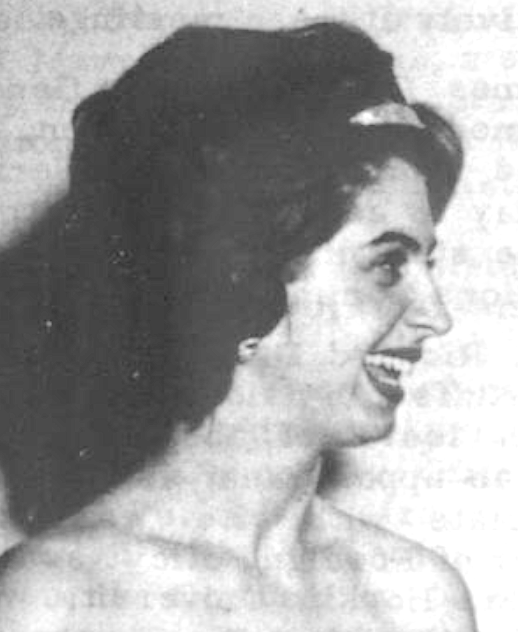
- Ann Schein, from a 1965 publication of the US State Department
- Education: Peabody Conservatory; Holton-Arms School
- Occupation: Pianist

Ann Schein Carlyss (10 November 1939 – 14 April 2026) was an American pianist and pedagogue.

== Biography ==
Born Ann Schein, she spent her early years in Evanston, Illinois. Her family moved to Washington D.C. when she was 4. At age 5, she began her piano training with Glenn Gunn and Bessie Gunn. She went on to study at the Peabody Conservatory under the direction of Mieczyslaw Munz. She attended the Holton-Arms School. In 1961, she began lessons with Arthur Rubinstein. The next year, she performed a solo debut at Carnegie Hall, followed by a performance at the White House in 1963 for President and Mrs. John F. Kennedy. In 1965, she toured the Middle East and South Asia for the US State Department, and performed at the Cairo Opera House.

In 1980, Ann Schein presented an entire season of the major Chopin repertoire in Lincoln Center's Alice Tully Hall, going through the entire Chopin cycle. From 1980 until 2000, when she retired, Ann was a member of the piano faculty at the Peabody Conservatory in Baltimore. In 2017 Ann Schein became a member of the Piano and Chamber Music Faculty at the Mannes School of Music, where she was a sought-after major lesson teacher.

She was an Artist-Faculty member of the Aspen Music Festival and School starting in 1984 and was a sought-after adjudicator in major international music competitions. In 1991, she performed with the Naumburg Orchestral Concerts, in the Naumburg Bandshell, Central Park, in their summer series.

During the summer of 2005, she opened the series of the complete Beethoven sonatas performed by members of the piano faculty. The Washington International Piano Competition established an award in Schein's and her mother's name.

Ann Schein married Earl Carlyss, a violinist with the Juilliard String Quartet, on 24 May 1969. The couple had two daughters. The couple gave live concerts as a violin and piano duo. Their marriage lasted until the death of Earl Carlyss on 23 January 2026. Ann Schein Carlyss died on 14 April 2026. Her daughters survive her.

== Recordings ==
Her first recordings were made for Kapp Records, with a 1957 recording of Chopin's second piano concerto. This was followed two years later by an album entitled "Miss Ann Schein: A truly brilliant pianist". Other albums included the Chopin Scherzi and an album of etudes as well as Chopin's 2nd and Rachmaninoff's 3rd piano concertos with Sir Eugene Goossens as conductor.

Her recording of solo piano works of Schumann was released in 2001 on the Ivory Classics label. A new recording of the Chopin Preludes and the B minor Sonata was released by MSR Classics in 2005.

- Mozart: Trio in Ef; Bruch: Pieces Op83/1-8, 1990 (Koch International Classics)
- Rorem: Day Music; Night Music, 1991 (Phoenix USA)
- Stravinsky: L'oiseau de feu No2; Duo Concertante, 1991 (Koch International Classics)
- Kirchner, Copland, Ives: Music for Violin and Piano (Phoenix USA)
- Jessye Norman Sings Alban Berg, 1995 (Sony)
- Ann Schein plays Schumann: Davidsbündlertänze; Arabeske; Humoreske, 2000 (Ivory Classics)

== Reviews ==
"In the 1960s the American pianist Ann Schein had a big success with Rachmaninov's Third Concerto. Davidsbündlertänze and Humoresque have been part of Schein's repertoire since the early days of her career - indeed she played the former at her Carnegie Hall debut in 1962. Schumann's popular Arabesque is performed fluently, the coda beautifully contemplative. Recorded at Spencerville Church in Maryland, the sound is resonant and full." International Piano Quarterly - Summer 2001

"Schein has made the Romantic literature the centerpiece of her repertoire, hardly surprising considering her teachers, Mieczyslaw Munz at the Curtis Institute, Arthur Rubinstein, and Dame Myra Hess. She has lived with these major Schumann works long and intimately, and it shows in her performances as well as in her descriptive notes. With fluent keyboard technique at her disposal, Schein invests these works with poetic imagination and romantic flair. Her readings tend to be straightforward and without exaggeration, but sensitive and subtly nuanced. The recorded sound is close and vivid, adding to the enjoyment of this disc." Fanfare Magazine - July/August 2001

== Sources ==
- Artist's biography published with Ann Schein's CD "Schumann: Davidsbündlertänze, Arabeske, Humoreske", 2000, Ivory Classics, Columbus Ohio. 64405-71006
- Details of Kapp recordings obtained by searching Dec 14 2009
