= Angelica Morales von Sauer =

Mexican pianist and composer (1911–1996)

Angelica Morales von Sauer (1911–1996) was a Mexican composer, pianist and professor of piano.

== Life ==
von Sauer was born on January 11, 1911, in Gurabo, Puerto Rico, the daughter of Puerto Rican violinist Angel Celestino Morales and her Mexican mother Dolores Arellano who was a pianist. At six months old, the family moved to Aguascalientes, Mexico. Angelica received her first piano lessons from her mother, and gave her first recital in 1921. At the age of twelve she was heard by the Russian pianist Josef Lhevinne, who was on tour in Mexico and urged the government to grant her a scholarship to go study abroad, and Angelica moved to Berlin where she auditioned for the pianist Ferrucio Busoni. While Busoni was no longer taking students, he indicated Angelica should study with this protoge Egon Petri. She enrolled in the Hochschule für Musik Berlin, and started studying with Emil von Sauer. In 1925 Angelica moved to Paris to further her musical study, and in the middle of 1926 she spent four months in Mexico where she studied with Josef Hofmann. In 1928 she moved to the United States where she studied with Josef Lhevinne in New York. In 1930 she went to Bad Gastein initially to study with Emil von Sauer again, and by 1939 they were married. Emil von Sauer died in 1942. She returned to Mexico in 1946 and was performing and, starting in 1947, teaching at the Conservatorio Nacional de Música (Mexico). Starting in 1948 she gave masterclasses in Mexico which were three weeks long and reached a broad array of younger pianists. In the 1990s, she spoke of some challenges she experienced during this time in Mexico which ultimately caused her to leave Mexico. In 1955, she was invited to join the faculty of the University of Kansas. She retired in 1973, at 62 years of age.

Angélica Morales von Sauer died on April 16, 1996, at the age of 85, in Stillwater, Oklahoma.

== Performances and recordings ==
Her first performance in Carnegie Hall was in 1929, and she went on to recitals in Europe, Mexico, and the United States. After the death of her husband, she returned to Mexico where her endurance in her performances was noted. She also returned to venues such as Carnegie Hall which she played again in 1958. In March 1962, she recorded numerous works by her late husband Emil von Sauer for the Saarländischer Rundfunk.

Angélica Morales von Sauer's comparatively small discography includes recorded the entire Well-Tempered Clavier of Bach and the Chopin Sonata No. 3.

== Awards and honors ==
In 1958 she was named an honorary member of the Sigma Alpha Iota Fraternity, of the University School of Music in Ann Arbor. Michigan. In 1972, she received the Cross of Honor for Arts and Sciences from the Austrian Government. In 1995, the National Institute of Fine Arts of Mexico initiated the "Angélica Morales" National Piano Competition (Concurso Nacional de Piano "Angélica Morales"), which is held every three years in recognition of her career. The concert hall of the Escuela Superior de Música at the National Institute of Fine Arts bears the name of Angélica Morales.
