= Victoria Park Racecourse, Sydney =

Former racecourse in Sydney, New South Wales

Coordinates: 33.908°S 151.2105°E

Victoria Park Racecourse was a racecourse in Zetland, an inner-city suburb, south of Sydney, New South Wales, Australia. It was bordered by O’Dea Avenue, South Dowling Street, Epsom Road and Joynton Avenue.

The site was originally a lagoon and swamp which was drained in the early 1900s to create the racecourse. The racecourse was developed and privately owned by Sir James John Joynton Smith (1858–1943), a hotelier, racecourse and newspaper owner. It was said at the time to be the grandest and finest of the pony horseracing course in Sydney.

In 1908, a clay-and-cinder track, 1.81 kilometres in length, was built around the horseracing course, which was used for speedway racing by both cars and motorcycles until the early 1920s. The first motor racing meeting was held on 6 October 1908 and unusually, the schedule consisted of six horse races followed by two heats and a final of the One Hundred Guinea Handicap car race. Due to delays during the horse races, the final was postponed until 8 October and was won by Fred Howarth driving a Sizaire-Naudin.

In 1909, the first powered flight in Australia took place there in a Wright Model A aeroplane named "The Stella". The pilot was Colin Defries. Although only flying 120 yards (110 m) at 15 feet (4.6 m), it is acknowledged by Australian historians^{[6]} and the Aviation Historical Society of Australia, that the definition of flight established by the Gorell Committee on behalf of the Aero Club of Great Britain gives Colin Defries credit as the first to make an aeroplane flight in Australia. A 20-page booklet entitled The History of Aviation Souvenir Australian Tour by Ambrose Pratt, under direction of J & N Tait (price 6d), was issued at the time. It contains pictures of the pilot and the plane, as well as a seated passenger, with caption "preparing to fly".

During World War II, the site was used for an aircraft factory. In 1945 it reopened as a horse training course.

The racecourse was bought by British businessman Lord Nuffield in 1947, and from 1950 the site was used by Nuffield Australia for a motor vehicle assembly facility. Vehicle production was continued by Nuffield Australia and its successors BMC Australia and Leyland Australia until the factory was closed in 1975.

The site was acquired by the Commonwealth of Australia for a naval stores depot which operated until the mid-1990s. The site is currently undergoing redevelopment into high density housing. A three-storey totalisator building remains on the site, which has been used as a site office by the redevelopers, and will become the Green Square library. The racecourse is also remembered in the name of Tote Park, a small park on the site.

== 1935 racebook ==
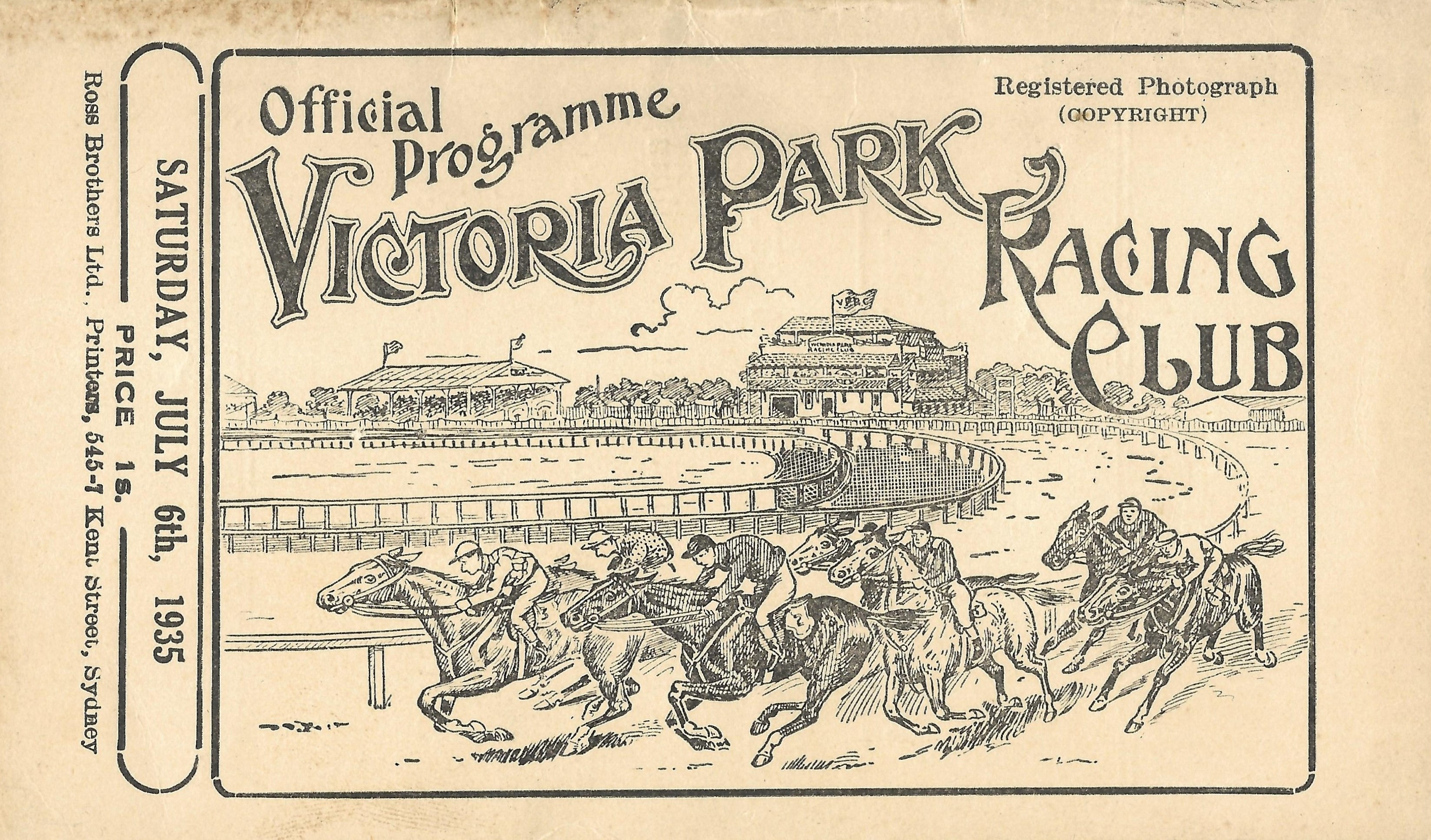
1935 Victoria Park Zetland racebook front cover

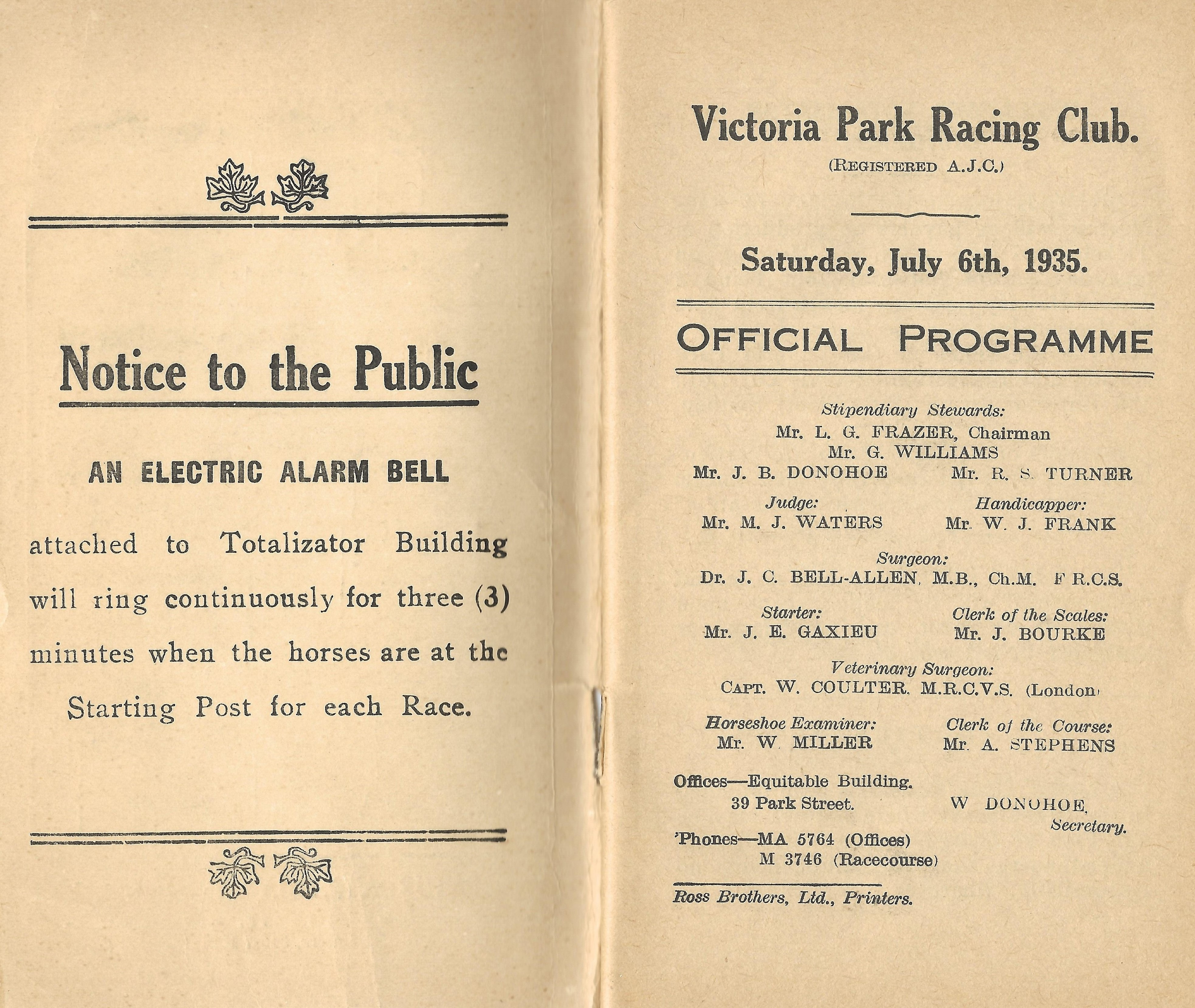
1935 Victoria Park Zetland raceday officials

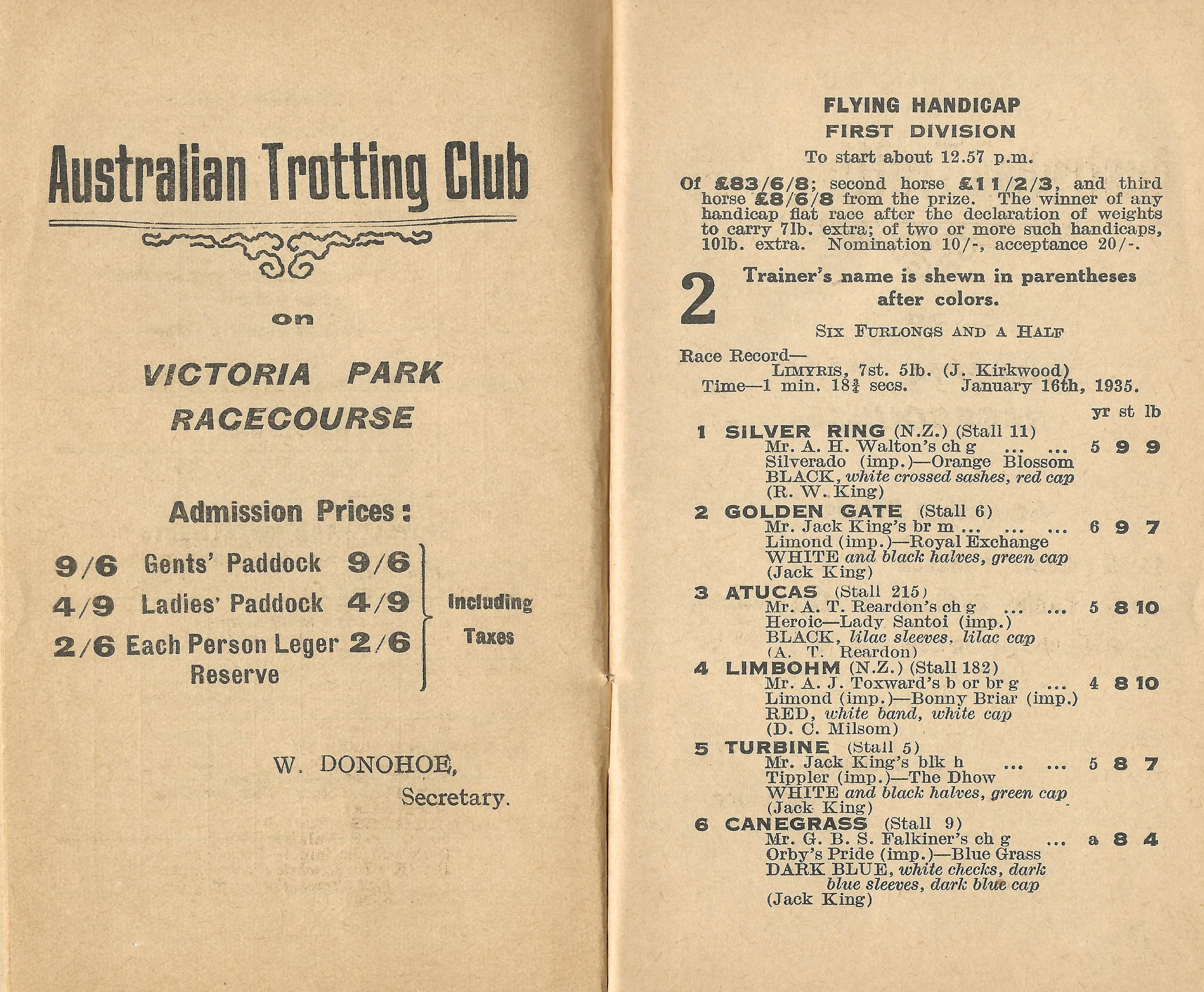
1935 Victoria Park Zetland starters and results

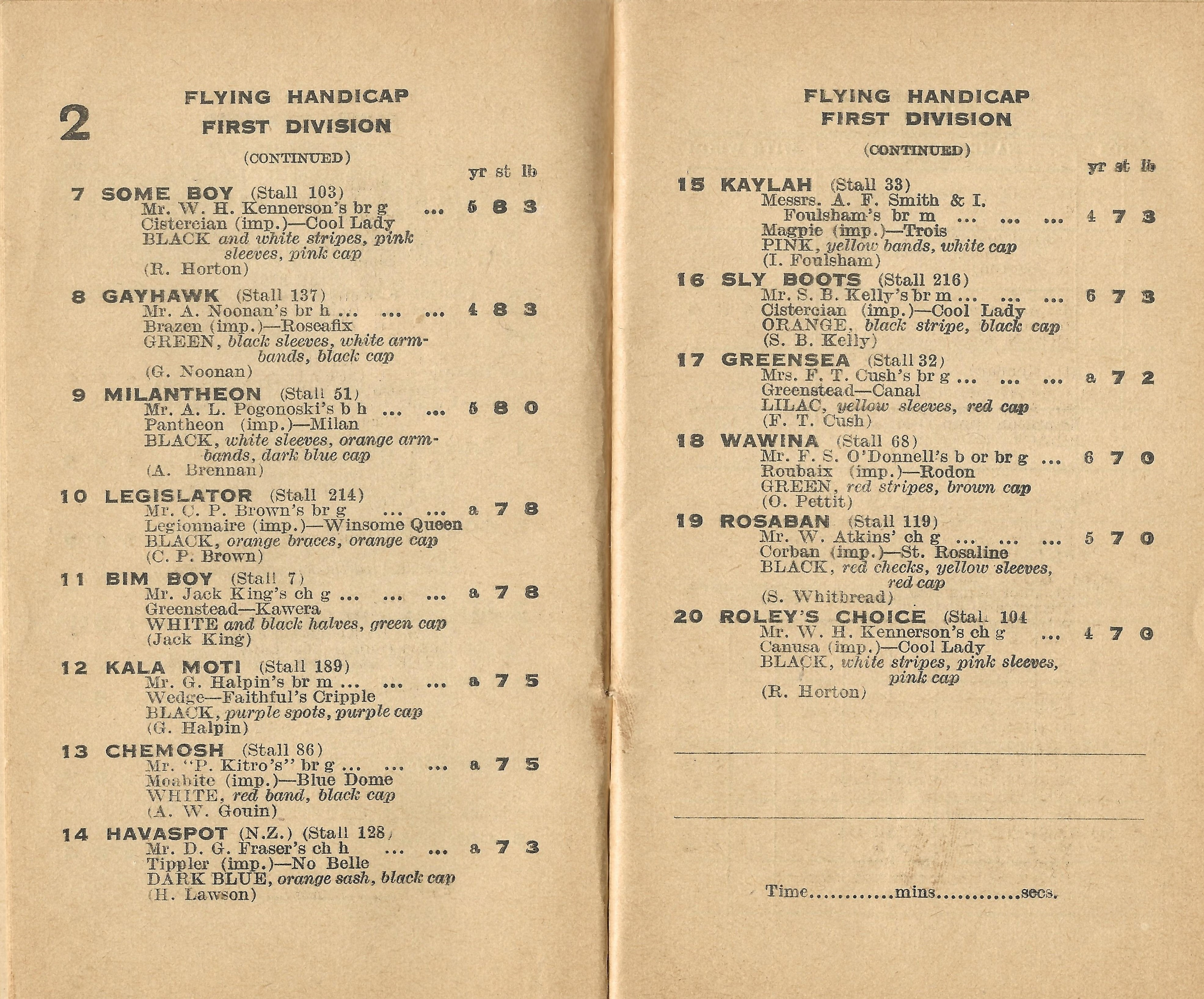
1935 Victoria Park Zetland showing the winner, Bim Boy

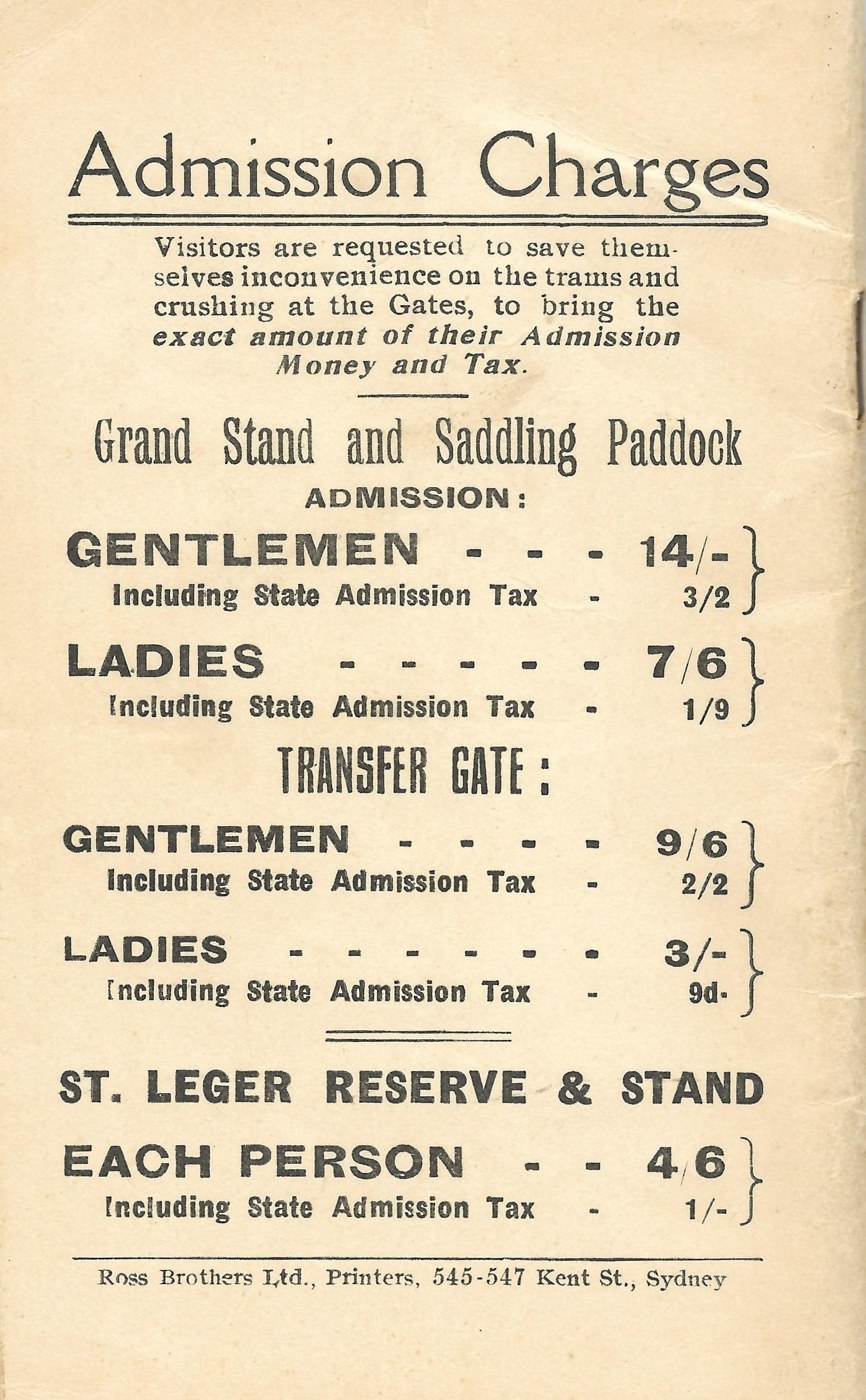
Back cover showing charges at the entrance gates

== Image gallery ==
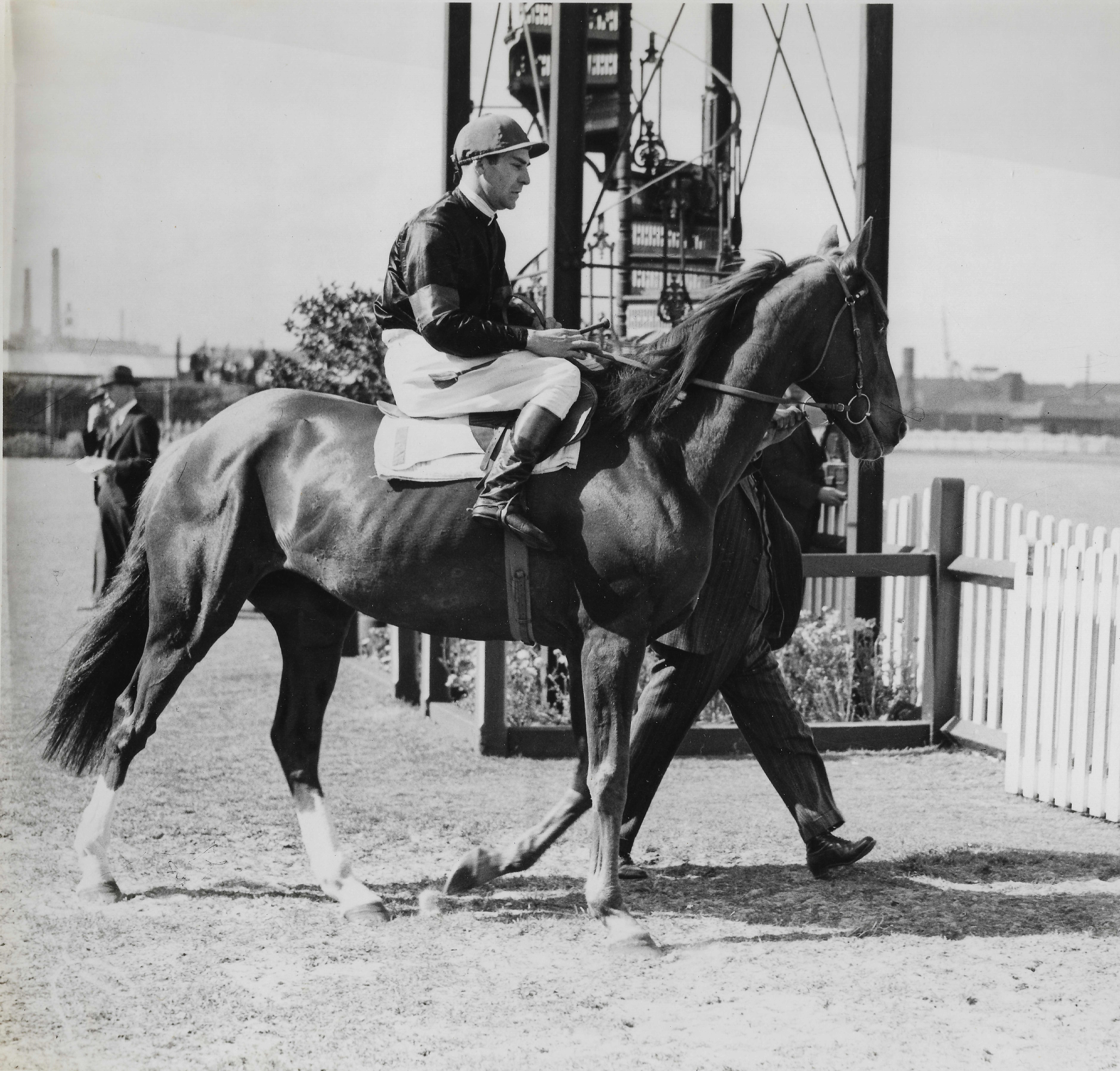
Rogilla & Darby Munro Victoria Park racecourse 1935

Collecting winnings, Victoria Park racecourse
