= Piano Concerto No. 1 (Prokofiev) =

1912 piano concerto by Sergei Prokofiev

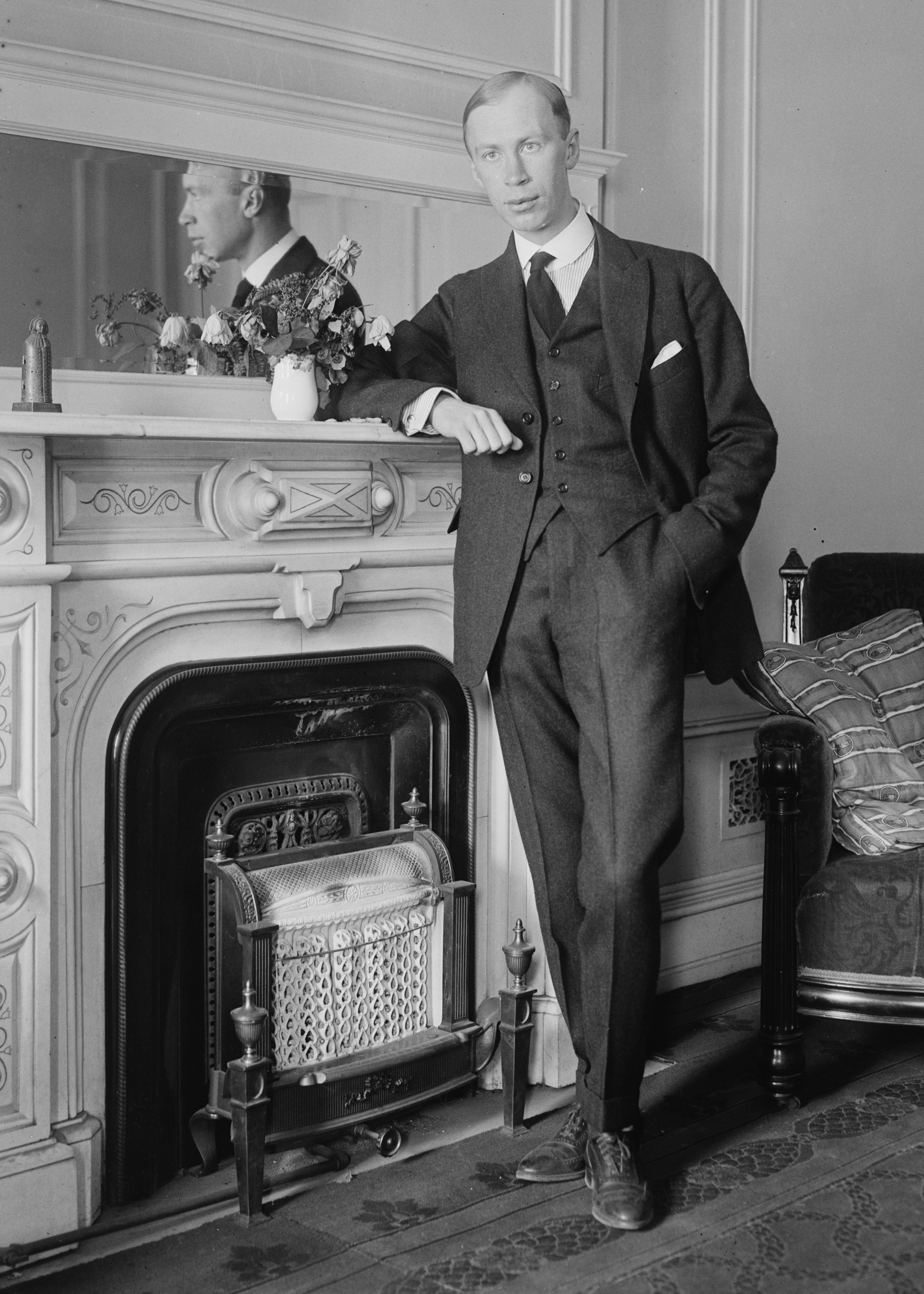
Sergei Prokofiev, c. 1918

Sergei Prokofiev set about composing his Piano Concerto No. 1 in D♭ major, Op. 10, in 1911, and finished it the next year. The shortest of all his concertos, it is in one movement, about 15 minutes in duration, and dedicated to the “dreaded Tcherepnin.”

== Structure ==
The work's single 15-minute span has the following tempo markings:

1. Allegro brioso —
2. Poco più mosso —
3. Tempo I —
4. Meno mosso —
5. Più mosso (Tempo I) —
6. Animato —
7. Andante assai —
8. Allegro scherzando —
9. Poco più sostenuto —
10. Più mosso —
11. Animato

Described as extroverted, even showy, for much of its length, the concerto begins and ends with the same spacious D♭ theme. Its Andante assai section, in G♯ minor, offers warm, veiled contrast: a quasi “middle movement.”

== Premiere ==
The concerto was first performed in Moscow on 25 July, 1912, with the composer as soloist and Konstantin Saradzhev conducting. Saradzhev “realized splendidly all my tempos,” wrote Prokofiev afterwards.

The British premiere was on 24 August 1920 at the Promenade Concerts under the baton of Henry Wood and Frederick Kiddle as a soloist.

== Rubinstein Prize ==
The 22-year-old composer-pianist won the Anton Rubinstein Prize for pianistic accomplishments in an 18 May 1914 performance of the work before the Saint Petersburg Conservatory. He had proposed his own concerto for the programme, reasoning that, though he may not be able to win with a classical concerto, with his own concerto the jury would be “unable to judge whether he was playing well or not.” Competition rules required that the piece be published, so Prokofiev found a publisher willing to produce 20 copies in time for the event. The jury headed by Alexander Glazunov awarded Prokofiev the prize rather reluctantly.

== Recordings ==
This is a partial list. At least 62 recordings exist in all.

Pianist		Orchestra	Conductor	Record company	Recording date	Recording location
Sviatoslav Richter	†	Prague Symphony Orchestra	Karel Ančerl	Supraphon	May 24, 1954	Rudolfinum
John Browning	†	Boston Symphony Orchestra	Erich Leinsdorf	RCA	Dec. 1-8, 1965	probably in Symphony Hall, Boston
Gary Graffman	†	Cleveland Orchestra	George Szell	CBS Masterworks	1966, possibly in March	somewhere in Cleveland
Vladimir Ashkenazy	†	London Symphony Orchestra	André Previn	Decca	Jan. 28-29, 1974	Kingsway Hall, London
Michel Béroff	†	Gewandhaus-Orchester Leipzig	Kurt Masur	EMI Pathé-Marconi	Jan. 2-7 and Feb. 24-27, 1974	Church of Reconciliation, Leipzig
Gabriel Tacchino	†	Orchestra of Radio Luxembourg	Louis de Froment	Turnabout	1973	studio of Radio Luxembourg
Vladimir Krainev	†	Moscow Philharmonic	Dmitri Kitaenko	Melodiya	1976	Moscow
Viktoria Postnikova	†	USSR Ministry of Culture Symphony Orchestra	Gennady Rozhdestvensky	Melodiya	1985	probably in Moscow
Boris Berman		Royal Concertgebouw Orchestra	Neeme Järvi	Chandos	May 8–12, 1989	probably in Amsterdam
Vladimir Krainev	†	Radio-Sinfonie-Orchester Frankfurt	Dmitri Kitaenko	Teldec	Jan. 1991	Broadcasting House Dornbusch
Yefim Bronfman	†	Israel Philharmonic	Zubin Mehta	Sony Classical	Oct. 14-25, 1991	Mann Auditorium, Tel Aviv
Evgeny Kissin		Berliner Philharmoniker	Claudio Abbado	Deutsche Grammophon	Sept. 1993	Philharmonie, Berlin
Alexander Toradze	†	Kirov Orchestra	Valery Gergiev	Philips Classics	live in July 1997	Mikkeli, Finland
Martha Argerich		Orchestre symphonique de Montréal	Charles Dutoit	EMI Classics	Oct. 1997	L'Eglise de St Eustache, Montréal
Oleg Marshev	†	South Jutland Symphony Orchestra	Niklas Willén	Danacord	July 30 to Aug. 10, 2001	Musikhuset, Sønderborg
Abdel Rahman El Bacha	†	Orchestre Symphonique du Théâtre Royal de la Monnaie	Kazushi Ōno	Fuga Libera	live, Sept. 24-26, 2004	live in the Palais des Beaux-Arts de Bruxelles
Jean-Efflam Bavouzet	†	BBC Philharmonic	Gianandrea Noseda	Chandos	Nov. 5, 2012	MediaCity, Salford, U.K.

† — Part of a complete cycle of the five concertos by this pianist and conductor. There have been relatively few such cycles (14 as of 2020) due to the diversity of the five works and their technical demands, and to the extraordinarily central role played by the conductor, such that a majority of pianists omit at least one or two of them from their repertory. The extant cycles are: Browning/Leinsdorf (Nos. 1 and 2: Dec. 1-8, 1965; No. 3: Nov. 25-27, 1967; No. 4: Nov. 27, 1967; and No. 5: April 25, 1969), Béroff/Masur (all: Jan. 2-7 and Feb. 24-27, 1974), Ashkenazy/Previn (Nos. 1 and 3: Jan. 28-29, 1974; No. 2: Sept. 30 to Oct. 2, 1974; No. 4: April 25, 1975; and No. 5: Dec. 9, 1974), Tacchino/de Froment (No. 1: 1973; Nos. 2 and 3: 1972; and Nos. 4 and 5: 1977), Krainev/Kitaenko (Moscow; Nos. 1 and 2: 1976; No. 3: 1981; and Nos. 4 and 5: 1983), Postnikova/Rozhdestvensky (No. 2: 1983; Nos. 1, 3 and 4: 1985; and No. 5: 1987), Paik/Wit (all: May 13–18, 1991), Krainev/Kitaenko (Frankfurt; Nos. 1 and 3: Jan. 1991; No. 2: Jan. 1992; No. 4: May 1992; and No. 5: May and Aug. 1992), Bronfman/Mehta (Nos. 1, 3 and 5: Oct. 14-25, 1991; and Nos. 2 and 4: July 8–17, 1993), Demidenko/Lazarev (Nos. 2 and 3: Dec. 19-20, 1995; and Nos. 1, 4 and 5: Jan. 2-3, 1998), Toradze/Gergiev (No. 1: July 1997; (Nos. 1 and 3: Oct. 1997) Martha Argerich/Charles Dutoit; Nos. 2 and 5: July 1–7, 1995; and Nos. 3 and 4: July 1996), Marshev/Willén (all: July 30 to Aug. 10, 2001), El Bacha/Ōno (all live: Sept. 24-26, 2004), and Bavouzet/Noseda (Nos. 1 and 4: Nov. 5, 2012; No. 2: Aug. 8-9, 2013; No. 3: June 29, 2012; and No. 5: Sept. 11, 2013).
