= Paul Weingarten =

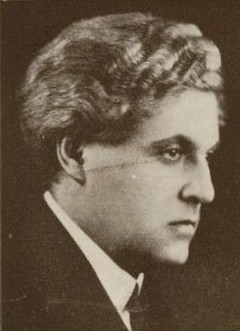
Paul Weingarten

Paul Weingarten (20 April 1886 in City of Brünn, Moravia, Austria – 11 April 1948 in Vienna, Austria) was a Moravia-born pianist and music teacher.

He studied Music History at the University of Vienna, where he obtained a Ph.D. in 1910.

He studied music at the Vienna Conservatory. Among his teachers were Emil von Sauer (piano), Robert Fuchs (theory), Guido Adler.

After traveling through Europe as a concert pianist, he became a piano teacher at the Vienna Music Academy. On his return to Austria, in March 1938, from a concert tour in Japan, German troops were advancing in Austria. He taught at the Tōkyō Ongaku Gakkō, Shitaya Dist., Tokyo Metropolis. He left Austria to return in 1945 to give a piano masterclass at the Vienna Academy of Music.

Jazz keyboardist Joe (Josef) Zawinul reports he was taught by Weingarten at the Vienna Conservatory in 1939 before Weingarten "had to leave."

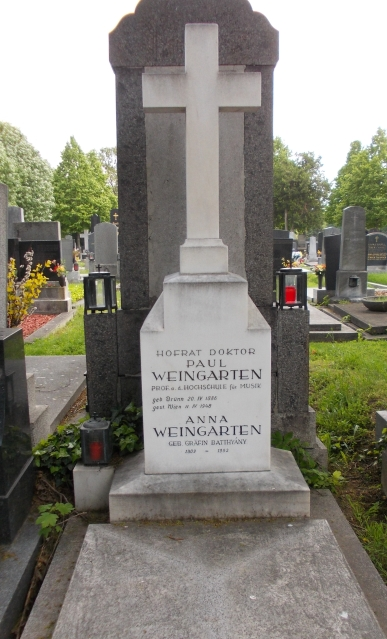
The grave of Paul and Anna

He was married to Anna Maria Josefa Elisabeth von Batthyány-Strattmann (23 March 1909, Kittsee – 21 September 1992, Vienna), a daughter of László Batthyány-Strattmann.
