= Earl Wild =

American pianist and composer (1915–2010)

Earl Wild in 1978

Earl Wild (November 26, 1915 – January 23, 2010) was an American pianist known for his transcriptions of jazz and classical music.

== Biography ==
Royland Earl Wild was born in Pittsburgh, Pennsylvania, in 1915. Wild was a musically precocious child and studied under Selmar Janson at the Carnegie Institute of Technology there, and later with Marguerite Long, Egon Petri, and Helene Barere (the wife of Simon Barere), among others. As a teenager, he started making transcriptions of romantic music and composition.

In 1931, he was invited to play at the White House by President Herbert Hoover. The next five presidents (Franklin D. Roosevelt, Harry S. Truman, Dwight D. Eisenhower, John F. Kennedy and Lyndon B. Johnson), also invited him to play for them, and Wild remains the only pianist to have played for six consecutive presidents.

In 1937, Wild was hired as a staff pianist for the NBC Symphony Orchestra. In 1939, he became the first pianist to perform a recital on U.S. television. Wild later recalled that the small studio became so hot under the bright lights that the ivory piano keys started to warp.

In 1942, Arturo Toscanini invited him for a performance of George Gershwin's Rhapsody in Blue, which was, for Wild, a resounding success, although Toscanini himself has been criticized for not understanding the jazz idiom in which Gershwin wrote. During World War II, Wild served in the United States Navy as a musician. He often travelled with Eleanor Roosevelt while she toured the United States supporting the war effort. Wild's duty was to perform the national anthem on the piano before she spoke. A few years after the war, he moved to the newly formed American Broadcasting Company (ABC) as a staff pianist, conductor and composer until 1968. He performed for the Peabody Mason Concert series in Boston in 1952, 1968, and 1971 and three concerts of Liszt in 1986. Wild was renowned for his virtuoso recitals and master classes held around the world, from Seoul, Beijing, and Tokyo to Argentina, England and throughout the United States.

Wild created numerous virtuoso solo piano transcriptions, including 14 songs by Rachmaninoff (1981), and several works on themes by Gershwin, as well as transcriptions of Berlioz, Buxtehude, Chopin, Fauré, Saint-Saëns, and Tchaikovsky. His "Grand Fantasy on Airs from Porgy and Bess" (1973), in the style of the grand opera fantasies of Liszt, is the first extended piano paraphrase on an American opera, and was recorded in 1976 with its concert premiere in Pasadena on December 17, 1977. He also wrote two sets of "Virtuoso Etudes after Gershwin" (in 1954 and 1973) based on Gershwin songs such as "The Man I Love", "Embraceable You", "Fascinating Rhythm" and "I Got Rhythm", and "Theme and Variations on George Gershwin's Someone to Watch Over Me" (1989).

Other notable piano arrangements include an "Air and Variations" on Handel's "The Harmonious Blacksmith" (1993), a loose arrangement of the sarabande from Bach's Partita for Keyboard No. 1, BWV 825 in the style of Poulenc entitled "Hommage à Poulenc" (1995), and another Liszt-style fantasy "Reminiscences of Snow White" (1995), based on music from the animated Disney film. In 2004, he made several piano transcriptions of popular songs of the 1920s. There is also a piano and orchestra arrangement of music from Richard Rodgers' Slaughter on Tenth Avenue (1967).

He also wrote a number of original works. These include a large-scale Easter oratorio Revelations (1962), a work for chorus and percussion The Turquoise Horse (1975) based on an American Indian poem and legend, the Doo-Dah Variations on a theme by Stephen Foster, "Camptown Races" (1992), a 27-minute composition in several colorfully-titled movements, for piano and orchestra as well as a two-piano version (1995), "Adventure" (1941) for piano and orchestra, an early piano concerto (1932), and an early ballet "Persephone" (1934). His Sonata 2000, written that year, had its first performance by Bradley Bolen in 2003 and was recorded by Wild for Ivory Classics. In 2004, he wrote a suite of Belly-Dances for piano.

In the mid-1950s, he wrote music for many silent movie and opera sketches for Sid Caesar's television shows, and "also became Caesar's surrogate shrink. Caesar would ask him to play something--Rachmaninoff, Chopin, Debussy, Ravel--and felt better, and grateful for it." So grateful that Caesar would often embarrass Earl by kissing him on the mouth, even in front of others.

In the 1960s, he composed music for several television documentaries, television plays, and an off-broadway play by Harold Robbins, A Stone for Danny Fisher (1960).

Wild recorded for several labels, including RCA Records, where he recorded an album of Liszt and a collection of music by George Gershwin, including Rhapsody in Blue, Cuban Overture, Concerto in F, and "I Got Rhythm" Variations, all with the Boston Pops Orchestra and Arthur Fiedler. In 1965, he recorded for Reader's Digest the four Rachmaninoff piano concertos and Rhapsody on a Theme of Paganini in London with the Royal Philharmonic Orchestra conducted by Jascha Horenstein, originally issued as a set of vinyl LPs. These were later reissued on CD by Chesky and Chandos. Later in his career, Wild recorded for Ivory Classics.

Under his teacher Selmar Janson, Wild had learned Xaver Scharwenka's Piano Concerto No. 1 in B-flat minor, which Janson had studied directly with the composer, his own teacher. When, over 40 years later, Erich Leinsdorf asked Wild to record the concerto, he was able to say "I've been waiting by the phone for forty years for someone to ask me to play this".

In 1997, he was the first pianist to stream a performance over the Internet.

Wild, who was openly gay, lived in Columbus, Ohio, and Palm Springs, California, with his domestic partner of 38 years, Michael Rolland Davis. He was also an atheist. He died aged 94 of congestive heart disease at home in Palm Springs.

Harold C. Schonberg called him a "super-virtuoso in the Horowitz class".

Wild's memoirs A Walk on the Wild Side were published posthumously by Ivory Classics.

== Discography ==
- Earl Wild at 30 – Live Radio Broadcasts from the 1940s (Ivory Classics)
- Frédéric Chopin: The Ballades (Concert Hall, 1951)
- Earl Wild plays Gershwin (Coral)
- Walter Piston: Piano Quintet (WCFM, 1953)
- George Gershwin: Rhapsody in Blue; An American in Paris (RCA Victor, 1960)
- George Gershwin: Piano Concerto; 'I Got Rhythm' Variations (RCA Victor, 1962)
- Franz Liszt: Piano Extravaganzas On Operatic Themes (RCA Victor, 1962)
- The Virtuoso Piano (Vanguard Classics, 1964)
- The Fire and Passion of Spain (RCA, 1965)
- Sergei Rachmaninoff: Piano Concertos Nos. 1–4; Rhapsody on a Theme of Paganini (Reader's Digest, 1966, later RCA and Chesky, now Chandos Records)
- Sergei Rachmaninoff / Zoltán Kodály: Cello Sonatas (Nonesuch, 1967)
- The Demonic Liszt (Vanguard Classics, 1968)
- Xaver Scharwenka: Works for Piano and Orchestra (RCA, 1969)
- Ignacy Paderewski: Piano Concerto (RCA, 1971)
- Franz Liszt: Piano Concerto No. 1; Hungarian Fantasy (His Master's Voice, 1973)
- Peter Tchaikovsky: Piano Concerto No. 1 (RCA, 1976)
- Edward MacDowell: Piano Concerto (Quintessence, 1977)
- Frédéric Chopin: Piano Concerto No. 1 (RCA, 1977)
- Wolfgang Amadeus Mozart: Music for two pianos (RCA Red Seal, 1978)
- Music by César Franck, Gabriel Fauré and Maurice Ravel (Audiofon, 1982)
- The Art of the Transcription • Live From Carnegie Hall (Audiofon, 1982)
- Earl Wild Plays Liszt (The 1985 Sessions) (Ivory Classics, 2001)
- Franz Liszt: Sonata In B Minor / Polonaise No. 2 / Etudes De Concert / Transcendental Etudes / Hungarian Rhapsodies Nos 4, 12 & 2 (Etcetera, 1986)
- Earl Wild Plays Beethoven (dell'Arte, 1986)
- Gabriel Fauré: Cello Sonatas (dell'Arte, 1986)
- Franz Liszt: Transcriptions & Paraphrases (Etcetera, 1987)
- Earl Wild's Schumann Recital (dell'Arte, 1988)
- The Piano Music of Nikolai Medtner (Chesky, 1988)
- Earl Wild Plays His Transcriptions of Gershwin (Chesky, 1989)
- Earl Wild – Chopin: Scherzos & Ballades (Chesky, 1990)
- Chopin: The Complete Etudes (Chesky, 1992)
- Sergei Rachmaninoff: Sonata No.2 / Preludes (Chesky, 1994)
- The Romantic Master - Virtuoso Piano Transcriptions (Sony Classical, 1995)
- Reynaldo Hahn: Le rossignol éperdu (Ivory Classics, 2001)
- Earl Wild at 88 (Ivory Classics, 2003)
- Earl Wild Performs his own Compositions and Transcriptions (Ivory Classics, 2010)
