= Oleg Marshev =

Soviet-Russian pianist (born 1961)

Oleg Marshev (Russian: Олег Маршев, born 1961) is a Soviet and Russian pianist, born in Baku (Azerbaijani SSR, USSR) and now a resident of Italy.

== Biography ==
Oleg was born in the Azerbaijani capital Baku, and studied at the Moscow Conservatory, graduating in 1988 with a Performance Doctorate and winning the Pilar Bayona International Piano Competition in Zaragoza. In 1990, Marshev won the AMSA Piano Competition in Cincinnati and settled in Italy in 1991. In 1991, Marshev held his New York debut at Alice Tully Hall in the Lincoln Center.

Oleg Marshev's first recording project was the complete original works for solo piano by Prokofiev (5 CDs) for Danacord Records. He has since recorded over 30 CDs for the same label, featuring works by Schubert, Brahms, Strauss, Rubinstein, Rachmaninov and others. He became the first pianist to perform the entirety of Emil von Sauer’s piano music, making up 6 volumes.
