= Josef Pischna =

Josef Pischna (Czech: Josef Pišna; 15 June 1826 – 19 October 1896) was a Czech pianist and composer.

Josef Pischna was born in Rtišovice near Příbram and studied oboe at the Prague Conservatory from 1840 to 1846. He worked for thirty-five years as a pianist and piano teacher in Moscow. Of his compositions, the 60 Klavierübungen (60 Exercices progressifs - 60 Piano Exercises) have commanded an abiding importance. They have appeared in several editions and been used up to the present time in piano teaching.

The strong endorsement which the Pischna exercises have received from virtuosos and the wide use which has come to Der Kleine Pischna,: The Little Pischna, (a set of remarkably fine easy technical exercises written by Wolff, a pupil of Pischna) have led to innumerable inquiries regarding the identity of Pischna. Josef Pischna was born at Iang Lhot Bohemia in 1826. In 1847 he graduated from the Royal Conservatory at Prague as an oboe player, however, as in all Continental schools, he was obliged to study piano in addition to the orchestral instrument. He also had the thorough training in harmony, counterpoint, musical history, etc., which is demanded before the student is permitted to graduate. Consequently, although he lost his identity in the orchestras in which he performed, he really was a very able and well trained musician. From Prague he went to Odessa, Russia, and became the conductor of a military band. Later he moved to Moscow, where he became Professor of Music in the endowed institute for young ladies of noble birth. There he remained for thirty-five years, playing piano practically all of this time. It was there that he had an opportunity to compose his technical exercises. Working carefully and slowly, he soon produced results which attracted wide attention. Pischna retired on a pension from the Russian government. Thereafter he lived in Prague taking a few private pupils. He died 19 October 1896 in Prague. Pischna's name in Bohemian was Pizny.
