= Emil von Sauer =

German composer and pianist (1862–1942)

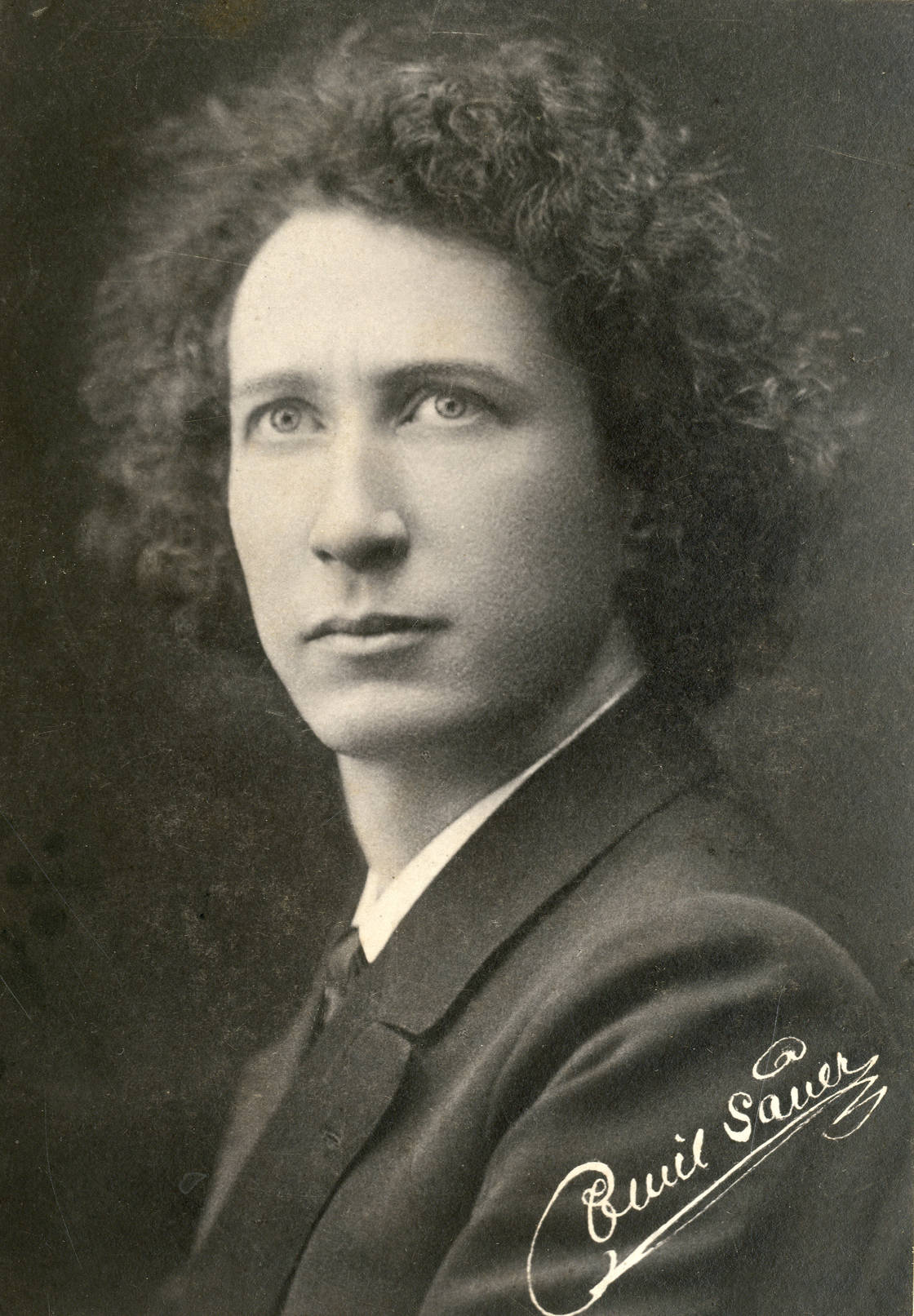
Emil von Sauer in 1919 with signature

Emil Georg Conrad von Sauer (8 October 1862 – 27 April 1942) was a German composer, pianist, score editor, and music (piano) teacher. He was a student of Franz Liszt and one of the most distinguished pianists of his generation. Josef Hofmann called von Sauer "a truly great virtuoso." Martin Krause, another Liszt pupil, called von Sauer "the legitimate heir of Liszt; he has more of his charm and geniality than any other Liszt pupil."

== Life ==
Sauer was born in the Free and Hanseatic City of Hamburg on 8 October 1862 as Emil Georg Conrad Sauer. He studied with Nikolai Rubinstein at the Moscow Conservatory between 1879 and 1881. On an 1884 visit to Italy he met the Countess von Sayn-Wittgenstein, who recommended him to her former paramour, Franz Liszt. He went on to study with Liszt for two years, but did not for some time consider himself a Liszt pupil. In an 1895 interview, he even denied it: "It is not correct to regard me as a pupil of Liszt, though I stayed with him for a few months. He was then very old, and could not teach me much. My chief teacher has been, undoubtedly, Nicholas Rubinstein." In his later years, however, Sauer realized the influence of Liszt on himself and on music in general.

From 1882, Sauer made frequent and successful tours as a virtuoso pianist; his performing career lasted until 1940. He premiered in London in 1894 and New York in 1899. In 1901 he was appointed head of the Meisterschule für Klavierspiel at the Vienna Academy. Sauer left this post in April 1907 but returned to it in 1915. Some of his pupils continued on to successful concert or other significant music careers; See: List of music students by teacher: R to S#Emil von Sauer.

In 1917, Sauer was raised to the peerage by the Austrian-Hungarian Monarchy, which added the nobiliary particle "von" to his name. He was also awarded the Gold Medal of the Royal Philharmonic Society of London.

Emil von Sauer was married twice. Angelica Morales (von Sauer), his second wife, carried on his legacy in teaching. Sauer had two sons with Morales—Julio and Franz.

He died in Vienna, Austria on 27 April 1942, aged 79.

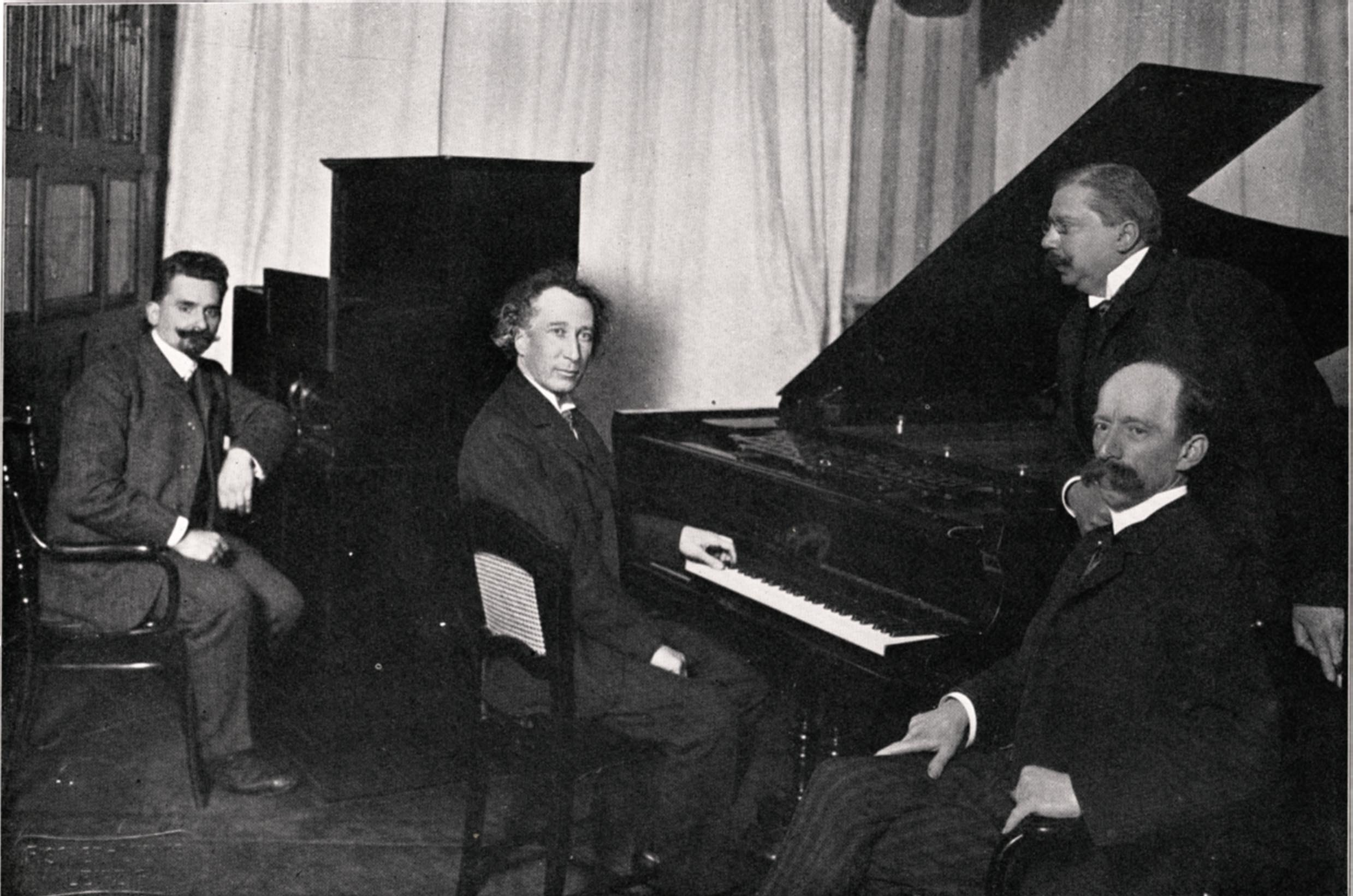
Emil von Sauer, November 25, 1905, recording for Welte-Mignon in Leipzig. Left: Karl Bockisch

== Playing ==
Regardless of his own opinion initially, Sauer was considered to have emphasized the original Liszt approach to piano as well as a strong Romantic approach to a musical technique which demanded total command of the keyboard in what was known as the Liszt School of piano. Unlike his fellow pupil Moriz Rosenthal, who could overwhelm the keyboard with orchestral force, von Sauer was said to caress the piano in a suave, polished manner. His recordings show him as a smooth pianist who was inclined toward relaxed tempos and the exactitude of detail over temperament. While his playing may have sometimes lacked breadth, it was always elegant and beautifully finished.

== Compositions ==
Sauer wrote piano concertos, piano sonatas, concert études, piano pieces, and lieder. His compositions have been considered of minor importance. Nevertheless, six CDs of his piano music were recorded by Oleg Marshev.

He also edited the complete piano works of Johannes Brahms and several academic works by Josef Pischna, Louis Plaidy, and Theodor Kullak.

== Selected works ==
- Two piano concertos
- Two piano sonatas
- Études de Concert
- Suite moderne

== Selected discography ==
=== Playing ===
- Emil von Sauer—1940 live recordings. Works by Chopin, Sauer, Schubert, Schumann, Sgambati. Willem Mengelberg conducts the Royal Concertgebouw Orchestra (Arbiter CD 114).
- Emil von Sauer: The Complete Commercial Recordings (3-CD set, Marston Records).
- Emil von Sauer Plays Liszt: Piano Concertos Nos 1 and 2. Orchestre des Concerts du Conservatoire conducted by Felix Weingartner (Dutton Labs UK B0001DCXLK).

=== Compositions ===
- Piano Concerto No. 1 played by Stephen Hough with the City of Birmingham Symphony Orchestra conducted by Lawrence Foster. Recorded in 1994. The CD also contains Xaver Scharwenka's Piano Concerto No. 4 in F minor, Op. 82 (Hyperion no. 66790).
- Piano Concerto No. 2 played by Oleg Marshev with the Aarhus Symphony Orchestra conducted by James Loughran (Danacord DACOCD 596).
- Piano Sonata No. 2 and Other Piano Works played by Oleg Marshev (Danacord DACOCD 534).
- Études de Concert played by Oleg Marshev (Danacord DACOCD 487).

== Bibliography ==
- Anderson, Robert Kinloch, ed. Stanley Sadie, "Sauer, Emil von," The New Grove Dictionary of Music and Musicians, First Edition (London: Macmillan, 1980), 20 vols. ISBN 0-333-23111-2.
- Crocus, Anita, “Emil von Sauer, Liszt’s Forgotten Protégé,” biography: ISBN 978-1-64388-964-1, July 12, 2022.
- Heliotes, Steven, Notes for Hyperion CDA66790, Scharwenka: Piano Concerto No. 4; Sauer: Piano Concerto No. 1; Stephen Hough, pianist; City of Birmingham Symphony Orchestra conducted by Lawrence Foster (London: Hyperion records, 1995).
- Renfroe, Anita Boyle, Emil von Sauer; A catalogue of his piano works. Louisville, KY, Southern Baptist Theological Seminary, Diss., 1981 Microfiche.
- Schonberg, Harold C., The Great Pianists (New York: Simon & Schuster, 1987, 1963). ISBN 978-0-671-64200-6.
