= Vladimir Genin =

Russian film score composer and pianist

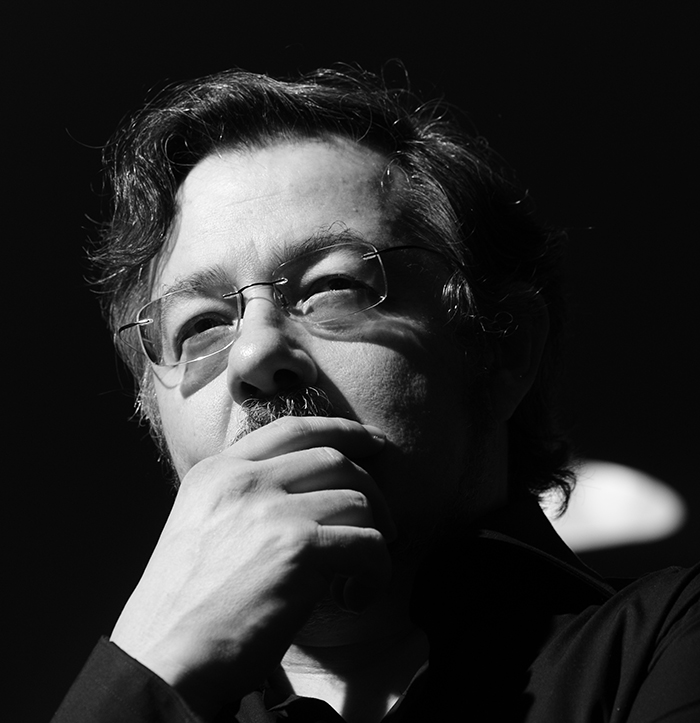
- Vladimir Genin, composer & pianist (2011)
- Born: 31 March 1958 (age 68); Moscow, Russia
- Education: Moscow Conservatory
- Spouse: Irina Skrynnik

Vladimir Mikhailovich Genin (born 31 March 1958 in Moscow, Soviet Union) is a Russian-German composer, pianist and piano teacher. He has lived in Munich since 1997.

== Life, career, compositions ==
Vladimir Genin is the son of the writer and musician Mikhail Genin and Elena Spinel. His grandfather Jossif (Joseph) Spinel was a painter and stage designer, who contributed to Sergei Eisenstein’s films Ivan the Terrible and Alexander Nevsky.

After graduating in 1977 from the Tchaikovsky Academic Music College at the Moscow State Conservatory, he studied piano at the State Pedagogical University with Alisa Kezheradze and then continued composition with Prof. Roman Ledenev and piano with Prof. Ilya Klyachko at the Moscow State Tchaikovsky Conservatory. His compositional development was strongly influenced by his long friendship with Shostakovich's pupil Georgy Sviridov.

His music has been performed across Europe, Russia, South Korea and the United States by leading orchestras and ensembles, including the Mariinsky Theatre Orchestra and the Rotterdam Philharmonic Orchestra under Valery Gergiev, the Graz Philharmonic and the Orchestra del Teatro Comunale di Bologna under Oksana Lyniv, as well as the Boulez Ensemble Berlin, Menuhin Academy Soloists, Kyiv Camerata, INSO Lviv, Henschel Quartet, Rudersdal Chamber Players, Camerata Nova, and the International New Symphony Orchestra Lviv. His works have also been performed in major venues such as the Concertgebouw in Amsterdam, the Berlin Philharmonie, and the Moscow Philharmonic Hall.

Works by Genin have been published by Sikorski, Wise Music Group (formerly Doblinger), Ries & Erler, Verlag Neue Musik, UMP (United Music Publishing, UK), and others.

He has participated in numerous international festivals, among them Pietrasanta in Concerto (Italy), the International Review of Composers in Belgrade, Moscow Autumn, MozArt Lviv, Contrasts (Ukraine), the Gori Choral Festival (Georgia), Musikfest der Münchner Gesellschaft für Neue Musik, and the Hohenloher Kultursommer (Germany).

His oratorio Plaint of Andrei Bogolubski, Great Prince of Vladimir was performed during the Millennium of Christianity in Russia and on tour in the USA, with more than 70 performances to date and over 20,000 records sold. His orchestrations of Mussorgsky's vocal cycles Songs and Dances of Death and Without Sun, commissioned by Dmitri Hvorostovsky, were conducted by Valery Gergiev in St. Petersburg, Rotterdam, and Brussels.

His CD Seven Melodies for the Dial, performed by Olga Domnina, was released by Challenge Records in 2012 and received international acclaim. Les Fleurs du Mal (2013) was named “CD of the Month” by MusicWeb International in 2015.

In 2014 he created the multimedia work Threnody for the Victims in Ukraine with the Nodelman Quartet. In collaboration with filmmaker Stefan Nacke, Genin has received international awards for the music films Dreams, Punto Coronata, Coronata in Blue, and Ukrainian Madonna.

His operas Alkestis and Orpheus. Eurydike. Hermes, based on texts by R. M. Rilke, premiered in 2023 at the Pierre Boulez Saal. In 2024, his Accordion Concerto was premiered at the Berlin Philharmonie.

Genin has also composed numerous film scores. His The Cosmonaut's Letter (2001) was shown in cinemas and on Premiere TV, and performed live by Camerata Nova and the Münchner Rundfunkorchester; the suite was later presented in Munich’s Philharmonie and Musikhochschule. He arranged music for several German, Austrian, Swiss, French, and Belgian film and TV productions, including ZDF’s Die Pilgerin (2014), Insoupçonnable (2010), and Lippels Traum (2009).

Since 2012, Genin has taught regularly at the Austrian Master Classes (Schloss Zell an der Pram) and heads the music department at the Hallbergmoos music school. He is the founder and artistic director of the concert series erstKlassiK.

== Selected works ==
- Alkestis, mini-monoopera (2015)
- Orpheus. Eurydike. Hermes, mini-monoopera (2017)
- Accordion Concerto (2024)
- Passacaglia in Yellow-Blue (2023)
- Das Knabenherz von Pyrmont, chamber opera (2019)
- Pietà, chamber concerto for violin and strings (2017)
- Epitaphium (2018)
- Malafemmina, or Awful Beauty, opera in two acts (2013)
- GeBeeth, orchestral homage to Beethoven (2019)
- Russian Roulette, orchestral work (2014)
- Liturgical Concerto for piano and orchestra (2011)
- Diptych for piano and orchestra (2010)
- Sinfonietta for strings (2010)
- Suite from The Cosmonaut’s Letter (2002)
- Threnody for the Victims in Ukraine (2014)
- Seven Melodies for the Dial, piano cycle (2011)
- Les Fleurs du Mal, song cycle (2013)
- Plaint of Andrei Bogolubski, oratorio (1987)
- Confession of St. Augustine, cantata (1990)
- Transport of Elements / Re-poetry, vocal cycle (2010)
- Last Moments, song cycle (2006)

== Authority control ==
- GND 135328160
- LCCN no20-40141
- VIAF 14474932
