= Vorontsova =

Vorontsova may refer to:

- 12191 Vorontsova, main belt asteroid with an orbital period of 4.19 years
- Anna Vorontsova (1722–1775), Russian lady in waiting, salonist, noble, cousin of the Empress Elizabeth of Russia
- Elizaveta Vorontsova (1739–1792), mistress of Emperor Peter III of Russia
- Evelina Vorontsova (born 1972), Russian/Dutch concert pianist and pedagogue
- Valentina Vorontsova (born 1982), Russian female water polo player
- Yekaterina Romanovna Vorontsova-Dashkova (1743–1810), friend of Catherine the Great and a major figure of the Russian Enlightenment
- Elizaveta Andreevna Vorontsova-Dashkova (1845–1924), Countess Shuvalov
