= Alfred Momotenko-Levitsky =

Dutch composer (born 1970)

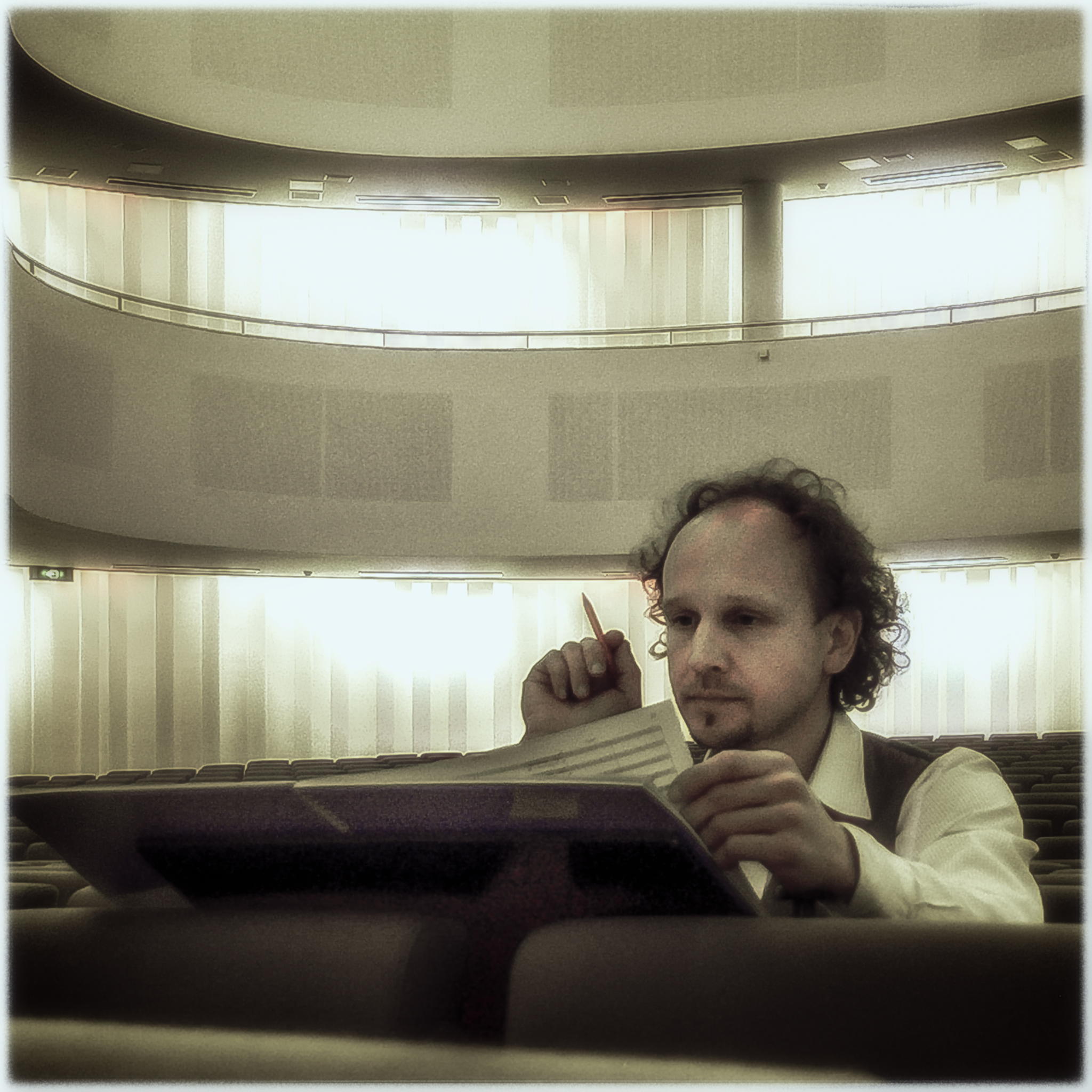
- Born: 7 August 1970 (age 56); Lvov, Ukrainian SSR, USSR
- Other name: Fred Momotenko
- Education: Moscow State Institute of Culture; Brabant Conservatory; Royal Conservatory of The Hague
- Occupations: Composer; sound engineer; percussonist
- Spouse: Babette Appels
- Children: 2, Modest Lorenzo Bernadette Momotenko, Julian Vittorio Gregorius Momotenko
- Website: alfredmomotenko.com

Alfred Momotenko-Levitsky (Russian: Альфред Момотенко-Левицкий; born 7 August 1970), also known as Fred Momotenko or just Momotenko, is a Dutch composer, percussionist, and sound engineer. Born to a musical family, he pursued studies in music in his native Soviet Union, where his experiences with vocal music and audio recording were important to his later development. An invitation to play in the Netherlands led him to settle there permanently. Initially composing electronic and multimedia works, a commission that led him to discover Alfred Schnittke's Choir Concerto eventually resulted in his later works being increasingly influenced by Znamenny and Byzantine chant.

== Early life and education ==
Momotenko was born in Lvov, Ukrainian SSR on 7 August 1970. His father was a military doctor, as well as a choirmaster and pianist; his mother was a singer and actress. Momotenko said that his later interest in vocal music was determined by his musical upbringing.

The serious illness of one of Momotenko's siblings forced his family to move to warmer regions. They initially went to the Moldavian SSR, then to the Georgian SSR, until they finally settled in the city of Sochi, Russian SFSR. Exposure to the various cultures within the Soviet Union during this period provided Momotenko with what he later called the "dynamic base of [his] musical ripening". He grew up in Sochi and began his musical training there as a percussionist and conductor, eventually graduating from the city's College of the Arts. During his studies, he also developed an interest in electronic music and in the works of Karlheinz Stockhausen and György Ligeti.

Subsequently, he studied percussion at the Moscow State Institute of Culture. By this point, he had begun to compose songs based on his own poetry. These early compositions were played in public and recorded on reel-to-reel tapes; his experience with the latter initiated his interest in audio recordings.

In 1990, amidst the dissolution of the Soviet Union, Momotenko and other Russian musical students were invited for a period of six months to perform in the Netherlands. This permitted him the opportunity to enroll at the Brabant Conservatory, where he studied percussion and improvised music. His choice of school led to his family's emigration from the Soviet Union. Momotenko's early compositions, musical instruments, personal papers, and library of scores and recordings were abandoned in Moscow and consequently lost.

While at the Brabant Conservatory, Momotenko decided to devote himself to composition, whereupon he became a student of Willem Jeths. Momotenko also studied with Alexandru Hrisanide, Vinko Globokar, and Roderik de Man.

== Career ==
Jazz and light music were the primary focus of Momotenko's early career. These soon were supplanted by works that demonstrated his growing commitment to contemporary music. At first, his compositions explored the possibilities of sound that resulted from the combination of acoustic and electronic instruments. This developed into a creative shift into sonology and post-graduate studies at the Royal Conservatory of The Hague.

Momotenko composed a variety of multimedia musical works, including for robots, during this period. Increasing possibilities in digital sound and ease in working with these inversely resulted in decreasing interest from audiences; this exhaustion became palpable to Momotenko himself.

At the start of his career in the Netherlands, Momotenko avoided composing for choirs, a reaction that was prompted by having been over-saturated with choral singing in his youth. Nevertheless, he did enjoy performing as a chorister in his student years. An invitation to compose a celebratory work for the forthcoming inauguration of a former abandoned monastery into a public building caused the composer to reflect:

Personally, I experienced [the secular inauguration of this abandoned monastery] as a tragedy because another monastery was down—however, in the Netherlands it seems almost "normal" that abandoned churches and monasteries were sold or demolished... So, I couldn't write any "festive" note, and this led to a dark choral piece. But still I remember this moment that changed my perspective on composition completely.

As preparation for his musical contribution to this event, Momotenko listened to Alfred Schnittke's Choir Concerto. Although the work was composed while Momotenko lived in the Soviet Union, censorship at the time prevented his acquaintance with it. His elation over the music's quality and serious theme was coupled with a personal epiphany to return to the roots of musical composition, without the need of mechanical and electronic intermediaries. "This felt like returning home", he later said.

In recent years, Momotenko has studied Znamenny and Byzantine chant. Both styles were unknown to him in his youth in the Soviet Union. One of the products of his studies has been the choral work Na Strastnoy, which sets on verses by Boris Pasternak; it is based on the former style of chant. After composing it, Momotenko said his life changed. Through his knowledge of chant, he said he better understood the resources that composers like Pyotr Ilyich Tchaikovsky, Sergei Rachmaninoff, and Igor Stravinsky drew upon in their work. He regretted not knowing chant sooner and not having the direct connection to it that Russian composers in the 19th century had. Comparatively speaking, he said, Soviet composition students of his time had been "raised on dry rations" that were required to be in accord with the tenets of socialist realism.

Momotenko has since stated that computers encourage passivity in their users and that he does not compose music with their aid in order to avoid distractions.

Aside from music for electronics and choirs, Momotenko's output includes works for orchestra, piano duet, and organs.

== Personal life ==
Aside from working as a composer, Momotenko is a sound engineer. According to him, the job is necessary because it is impossible for all but a very few of his Dutch compatriots to be able to financially support themselves from composition alone. "For the rest of us, it is a hobby", he said, "by which I mean to say in terms of earning an income". Momotenko has criticized the Dutch government's lack of funding for the arts. He also condemned the owners of the Concertgebouw for renting the hall to dance parties hosted by DJs utilizing amplified electronics; equipment that he said results in damage to the building.

Some of the composers that Momotenko has listed as personal favorites include Rachmaninoff, Stravinsky, Ligeti, Sergei Prokofiev, and Einojuhani Rautavaara. Upon first hearing the latter, Momotenko said, he felt surprise, adding that the Finnish composer's style was close to his own.

Momotenko is married to Babette Appels. While acknowledging his Russian origins, he identifies himself as a Dutch composer. He said that he admires Dutch ingenuity and the way its people "fought the sea". At home, he says that he has returned to the "old Slavic way of life".

== Compositions ==
Momotenko's compositions include:

Title	Instrumentation	Year	Notes
Menuetto	Organ	2001	
Drinklied	Voice and vibraphone	2002	Based on a poem by Gerrit Krol
Eneato	Violin or viola	2003	
VariA	Piano, violin, and cello	2003	
Les ondes de l'escarpolette	Piano	2004	
Liquid pArts	String quartet	2005	
Der letzte Traum	Wind quintet	2006	
Chimères I	Three organs	2007	
Au clair de la lune	Four-part vocal ensemble and surround audio	2008	Based on the eponymous French folk song
Cecilia	SATB choir	2012	
Cloud Messenger	Recorder, multimedia, and surround audio	2012	Based on the eponymous poem by Kālidāsa
Les vingt doigts	Piano four-hands	2016	Composed for Igor Roma and Nikola Meeuwsen as a companion to Stravinsky's Les cinq doigts
Danco Konsonanco	Recorder, pan flute, viola, accordion, and percussion	2016	
Na Strastnoy	SATB choir	2017	Composed as a companion to Rachmaninoff's All-Night Vigil and based on the eponymous poem from Pasternak's Doctor Zhivago
Our Father	SATB choir	2019	Setting of the Lord's Prayer in Old Church Slavonic
Earth's Prayers	Orchestra	2021	Composed as a companion to Gustav Mahler's Das Lied von der Erde
Madame en noir	Orchestra	2021	Premiered by the Rotterdam Philharmonic Orchestra conducted by Valery Gergiev
Creator of Angels	SATB choir	2021	Based on the poetry of Bella Akhmadulina
When you ask me (the Crystal Whistle song)	Siffleurs and female or girls' choir	2021	Words by the composer
Miracle	SATB choir	2022	Based on the poetry of Joseph Brodsky
Ave verum corpus	SATB choir	2024	
