= International Franz Liszt Piano Competition =

Dutch classical music piano award

The International Franz Liszt Piano Competition ("Liszt Competition") is an international piano competition. It is a member of the World Federation of International Music Competitions.

The Competition is held in Utrecht in the Netherlands. It first took place in 1986, one hundred years after the death of Franz Liszt.

Each time the Liszt Competition has been held it has seen over two hundred selected participants. Since 2014, only 14 contestants are selected after the International Selection Rounds hosted in USA, Asia and Europe.

== List of Prizewinners ==
Source Official webpage

Year	First prize	Second prize	Third prize
1986	Martijn van den Hoek, The Netherlands	Gregorio Nardi, Italy	Michael Lewin, United States of America
1989	Enrico Pace, Italy	Alexei Orlovetski, Russia	Wibi Soerjadi, The Netherlands
1992	Sergey Pashkevich, Russia	Evelina Vorontsova, Russia	Evelina Borbély, Russia
1996	Igor Roma, Italy	–	Tomoko Narata, Japan and Chi Wu, China (tied)
1999	Masaru Okada, Japan	Mariangela Vacatello, Italy	Yundi Li, China
2002	Jean Dubé, France	Ilona Timchenko, Russia	Giancarlo Crespeau, France
2005	Yingdi Sun, China	Anton Salnikov, Russia	Christiaan Kuyvenhoven, The Netherlands
2008	Vitaly Pisarenko, Russia	Nino Gvetadze, Georgia	Anzhelika Fuks, Hungary/Ukraine
2011	Masataka Goto, Japan	Olga Kozlova, Russia	Oleksandr Poliykov, Ukraine
2014	Mariam Batsashvili, Georgia	Peter Klimo, United States of America	Mengjie Han, The Netherlands
2017	Alexander Ullman, United Kingdom	Minsoo Hong, South Korea	Dina Ivanova, Russia
2022	Yukine Kuroki, Japan	Yeon-Min Park, South Korea and Derek Wang, United States of America (tied)	
2026	Alexander Kashpurin, Russia	Thomas Kelly, United Kingdom	Kang Tae Kim, South Korea

== See also ==
- List of classical music competitions
