= Christiaan Kuyvenhoven =

Dutch pianist

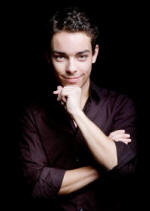
Kuyvenhoven in 2007.

Christiaan Kuyvenhoven (born 1985) is a Dutch pianist.

In April 2005 Kuyvenhoven won Third Prize at the prestigious International Franz Liszt Piano Competition, which took place in Utrecht for the seventh time. By winning the prize, Kuyvenhoven became the first Dutch pianist in sixteen years to win a prize at the competition. As part of the prize, Christiaan Kuyvenhoven had numerous appearances as a concert pianist, both in and outside the Netherlands. In addition to concert engagements at all major Dutch concert halls, he was also invited to appear in Algeria, Germany, France, Trinidad & Tobago, Curaçao, Tunisia and the United States.

In January 2006, Kuyvenhoven went on tour with the National Students' Orchestra of the Netherlands under the baton of Otto Tausk. The tour concluded with Christiaan's debut performance in the large hall of Amsterdam's Concertgebouw. In May 2006, he appeared in Paris and Algiers several times with the Dutch Matangi Quartet. Later that year, an extensive recital tour was planned through China, followed by appearances with the Orkest van het Oosten (Orchestra of Eastern Holland) and The Hague's Residentie Orkest.

In 1998, Christiaan Kuyvenhoven won first prize at the Princess Christina Competition in The Hague; two years later he was named Young Musical Talent for 2000. In the same year, he had his debut with the Residentie Orkest under conductor Jaap van Zweden. In 2004 he became winner of the XII Concurso Internacional de Piano Maria Campina in Faro, Portugal. He studied with Michail Markov at the Twente Music School, the Van Zweden School of Music and Enschede Conservatory. Subsequently, he had masterclasses with, amongst others, Menahem Pressler, Jerome Rose, Ton Hartsuiker, Mitsuko Uchida, and Leslie Howard.

== See also ==
- International Franz Liszt Piano Competition
