= Yingdi Sun =

Chinese pianist (born 1980)

Yingdi Sun 孙颖迪
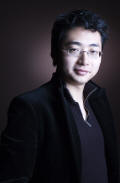

Background information
- Born: 1980 (age 45–46); Shanghai, China
- Instrument: Piano

Yingdi Sun 孙颖迪 (born 1980) is a Chinese pianist who won First Prize at the prestigious 7th International Franz Liszt Piano Competition, which was held in Utrecht in 2005. By winning the prize he has embarked on a demanding two-year concert tour in the Netherlands and abroad. This tour takes him around the globe and includes, in addition to many concerts in leading Dutch concert halls, performances in France, Belgium, Germany, Finland, Hungary, the Czech Republic, Poland, New Zealand, United Kingdom, Indonesia, Macau, Hong Kong, China, the United States and South Africa.

Already on the morning after the Final of the Liszt Competition, Yingdi performed in Amsterdam's Concertgebouw with the Netherlands Radio Symphony Orchestra under the baton of Jean-Bernard Pommier. In the course of his concert tour, he has played with the Beijing Symphony Orchestra, the Shanghai Opera and Philharmonic Orchestra, the Rotterdam Philharmonic and the Czech National Symphony Orchestra. Yingdi is also a very welcome guest in his own country. In November 2005 he was the guest of the Chinese President Hu Jintao as part of the festivities in honour of the visit of U.S. President George W. Bush to China.

The Shanghai-born Yingdi Sun was already winning prizes in his native China at an early age, including the Golden Bell Award at the Second National Piano Competition. In 2004, he was awarded a grant from Yamaha, enabling him to give chamber music concerts together with prize winners from the International Paganini Violin Competition and Tchaikovsky International Music Competition. In his own country, he was recently awarded the 'Bao Steel' Education Award and the Special Prize for Artists by Shanghai government. Yingdi Sun studied with Professor Sheng Yi-qi at the Conservatory of Music in Shanghai since 2001 and has participated in the master classes of, amongst others, Philippe Entremont, Xu Zhong, Roberto Carnevale and Leslie Howard.

== See also ==
- International Franz Liszt Piano Competition
