= Anton Salnikov =

Russian musician

- Антон Сальников
- Anton Salnikov in 2005
- Born: June 25, 1979 (age 47)
- Education: Moscow Central School of Music, Moscow Conservatory
- Occupation: Pianist

Anton Salnikov (Russian: Антон Сальников; born 25 June 1979) is a Russian pianist.

In April 2005, Salnikov won Second Prize and the CenE Bankiers Audience Award at the 7th International Franz Liszt Piano Competition in Utrecht. As part of these awards, he had the opportunity to concertise in the major cities of the Netherlands, Russia, China and Brazil. In 2006, Anton Salnikov, will play Schumann’s Piano Concerto with the Franz Liszt Hochschule Orchester of Weimar in Utrecht, Weimar and Paris (Évry), and has received invitations to perform in the Ukraine, Hungary, Ecuador, Georgia in the same year.

Anton Salnikov began his professional training at the Moscow Central School of Music under professor Vera Gornostayeva. Since 1997, he has studied with professor Sergei Dorensky at the Moscow State Tchaikovsky Conservatory. He has won prizes at piano competitions in Andorra, Italy, Japan, Germany and Taiwan. In 2001 he attracted much attention by winning both the Chopin and Scarlatti Prizes at the International Piano Competition in Cologne. Salnikov, who has now had concert appearances in France, Germany, Spain, Italy, Japan and China, regularly concertises in Russia and has played with, amongst other orchestras, the National Symphony Orchestra for Radio and Television in Moscow.

Currently he is Profesor in Superior Nacional Conservatory of Music in Quito, Ecuador.
