= Alexander Kashpurin =

Russian pianist and conductor (born 1996)

- Александр Кашпурин
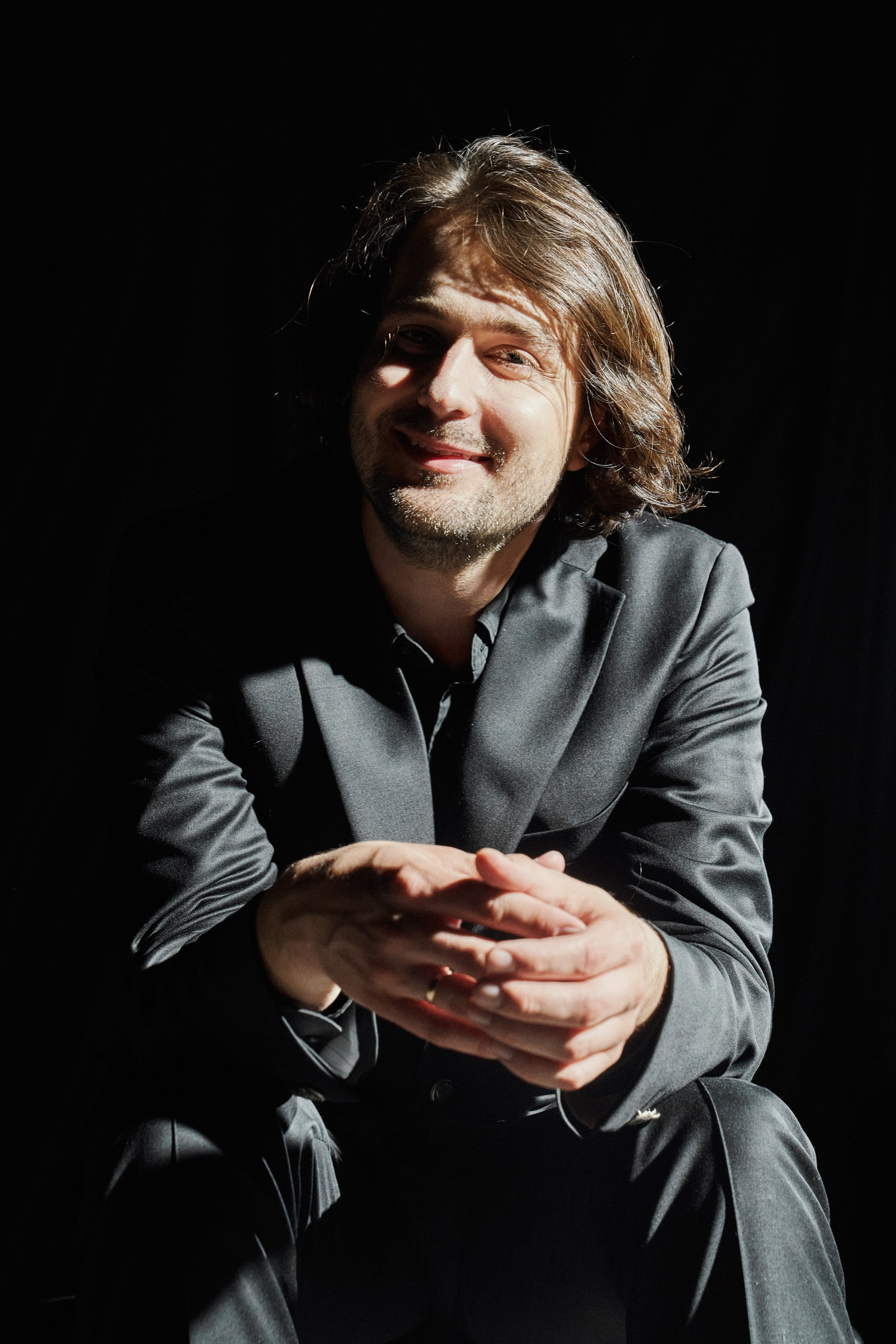
- Alexander, concert pianist and conductor
- Born: 21 of November 1996; Volgograd, Russian Federation
- Education: St Petersburg Conservatory
- Occupation: Musician
- Website: Official website

Alexander (Aleksandr) Kashpurin (Russian: Александр Кашпурин; born 21 November 1996) is an Israeli-Russian concert pianist and conductor from Saint Petersburg, Russia. He is the winner of a number of national and international piano competitions and graduated in 2025 as conductor. In addition to being a pianist and conductor, he also teaches at the Rimsky-Korsakov Conservatory Saint Petersburg Conservatory in Saint Petersburg.

== Music and career ==
Kashpurin started studying in the Musical Lyceum of Saint-Petersburg in the class of Irina Lobikova in 2009. In 2014, he joined the Rimsky-Korsakov Conservatory Saint Petersburg Conservatory, his teacher being prof. Tatyana Zagorovskaya. He graduated in 2019, followed in 2020 by his postgraduate; both summa cum laude. In 2021 he joined master classes at the Queen Elisabeth Music Chapel in Waterloo, Belgium, an elite program for exceptional young talents.

Since 2021 he is Associate professor (piano) at the Rimsky-Korsakov Conservatory.

Kashpurin is as pianist connected to the Marinskii theatre of Saint Petersburg and to the Philharmonia in Saint Petersburg In 2025 he graduated (Cum Laude) as conductor.

As a soloist and as a member of chamber ensembles he has toured in the Netherlands, Germany, Latvia, Lithuania, Belarus, Poland, Austria, Spain, Bulgaria, Mongolia, Canada, China and Italy (the Lacmus Festival 2023), Greece, Morocco, Azerbaijan. Kashpurin collaborated with such conductors as Gintaras Rinkevičius, Z. Gugkaev, M. Fedotov, A. Kantorov, etc.

In 2025 he graduated cum laude as conductor. Since 2022, he has led his own orchestra, Infinitum, which is also on his debut album In Search of Eternity.

Kashpurin participated in master classes of such pianists as Tamás Vásáry (Hungary), Cyprien Katsaris (France), Dmitri Bashkirov (Russia), Gottlieb Wallisch, (Austria), Willem Brons (Netherlands), Daniel Pollack (USA), A. Tuerk-Espitalier (Germany), Alexander Sandler (Russia), Louis Lortie (Queen Elisabeth Chapel, Belgium).

== Awards and honours ==
Kashpurin is a laureate of several International and All-Russian piano competitions and awards:

- In years 2010, 2011, 2012 and 2013 he became a winner of the "Young Talents" Award of the Government of Saint-Petersburg;
- 2013: the 9th "Chopin Golden Ring" International Competition of Young Pianists in Slovenia (absolute winner and special award recipient);
- 2017: the 3rd All-Russian S. Bendizky Piano Competition (Grand Prix and special award recipient);
- 2017: the 7th J. Vitols International Piano Competition, Latvia (Grand Prix and special award recipient)
- Two-time winner of the All-Russian competition "Young talents of Russia" in the nomination "Musical Art";
- 2019: First prize winner (and 2 special prizes) of the VIII International Čiurlionis Piano Competition in Vilnius, Lithuania.
- 2019: First prize winner (and 3 special prizes) of the 1st International Russian Music Piano Competition in Ryazan Russia
- 2021: First prize winner of the 'Les Étoiles du piano' competition in Lille (France)
- 2026: First Prize winner (and Audience Award winner) of the International_Franz_Liszt_Piano_Competition in Utrecht, Netherlands. In the final Kashpurin played Liszt's Second Piano Concerto.

== Selected recordings ==
- Michael Alexeyev: 26 preludes for piano Chandos Records (2019). "Michael Aleksejev componist and Alexander Kashpurin piano: 26 preludes for piano/Alexander Kashpurin".
- In Search of Eternity: Liszt, Beethoven, Tchaikovski Galatea Records (22 August 2022). "CD Alexander Kashpurin, In Search of Eternity: Liszt- Apres un lecture de Dante, Beethoven-Sonata nr 32, Tchaikovsky/Pletnev - Nutcrackter Suite, Barber- Adagio for strings, op. 11, Rachmaninoff-Vocalise, op.34".
- Alexander Kashpurin, Medtner & Rachmaninoff Galatea Records (15 March 2026). "CD Alexander Kashpurin, Medtner-Forgotten Melodies op 38 & Rachmaninoff- Études Tableaux op 39".

== Reviews ==
- Aart van der Wal of Opus Klassiek (15 December 2022). "Review of the CD of Alexander Kashpurin In Search of Eternity".
- Christopher Axworthy, music crictic in London (9 January 2022). ""Beethoven La Chapelle offers an Ode to Joy", review about Alexander Kashpurin playing Beethoven/Liszt Symphony no.1 op 21 in Wigmore Hall, London".
- Christophe Huss, music critic of LEDEVOIR (6 April 2024). "Salle Bourgie, Montreal: "Alexander Kashpurin, un great talent unveiled" about Alexander Kashpurin playing Rachmaninoff Études-Tableaux op. 39".
- Alain Cochard, music critic Concertclassic (15 June 2025). "Review Alexander Kashpurin playing Rachmaninoff Études-Tablaux during the Lille Piano(s) Festival June 2025,".
- World Federation International Music Competitions (25 January 2026). "Liszt Competition, Alexander Kashpurins Last-Minute Triumph".
