= Miguel Ituarte =

Miguel Ituarte (born 1968, Getxo) is a Basque Spanish pianist.

Ituarte began piano lessons at the Bilbao Conservatory with Isabel Picaza and Juan Carlos Gómez Zubeldia, and then was trained at the Madrid Conservatory studying with Almudena Cano. In Amsterdam, he studied at the Sweelinck Conservatorium with Jan Wijn. In 1995, he won the XXXVII Premio de Jaén and the IV Fundación Guerrero Competition, and was a finalist at Santander's XIII Paloma O'Shea Competition. He has performed internationally.
