= Soldier On (song) =

2020 song by Di-rect

Single by Di-rect
- Released: 21 February 2020
- Recorded: January 2020
- Genre: Pop rock
- Length: 3:27
- Label: 8ball
- Songwriters: Niels Zuiderhoek; Marcel Veenendaal; Frans van Zoest; Jamie Westland; Bas van Wageningen; Paul Jan Bakker; Guus van der Steen

Di-rect singles chronology
"Nothing to Lose" (2019)	"Soldier On" (2020)	"Color" (2020)

"Soldier On" is a song by the Dutch rock band Di-rect. It was released on 21 February 2020 as the lead single to the band's ninth studio album Wild Hearts.

It was the band's comeback hit, reaching No. 3 on the Dutch Top 40 and becoming their first top-ten single in 13 years. It was also the band's first top-10 hit since lead vocalist Marcel Veenendaal joined the band. While it was written prior, the song became closely associated with the COVID-19 pandemic in the Netherlands.

It won the 2021 Edison Award for Best Song.

== Background ==
The song was written in January 2020. It is a tribute to anyone who dares to stand out in a world driven by fear. Lead singer Marcel Veenendaal said, "We are known as a band that likes to party, but it is also always very nice to use that same stage to sing about your pain. Everyone carries their own cross and baggage with them."

Guitarist Frans "Spike" van Zoest said that after Veenendaal wrote the song, he immediately thought it was beautiful, but the record label told them to temper their expectations because releasing a ballad as the lead single would not lead to much success.

It was released before the first COVID-19 lockdowns in the Netherlands, but the song's popularity soared during the lockdown period beginning in March 2020. Veenendaal said, "When corona came, and the Stay Home campaigns, the song was completely carried. That people draw strength from that is very special to feel. It is important that people do not have to have their light dimmed by everything that is happening around them."

De Telegraaf wrote in 2025 that "Soldier On" helped break Di-rect to an even larger level of popularity, which ultimately allowed them to play three shows at stadium De Kuip in Rotterdam to almost 150,000 combined spectators.

== Reception ==
In May 2020, it entered the top ten of the Dutch Top 40, where it ultimately peaked at No. 3. It was Di-rect's first top-ten hit in 13 years, since "A Good Thing" in 2007. It was also their first top-ten hit since Marcel Veenendaal replaced Tim Akkerman as the band's lead singer in 2009. Di-rect became the fourth Dutch band (after BLØF, Kane and Ch!pz) to record at least eight top-ten singles in the 21st century.

"Soldier On" was the second-most played song in the Netherlands by radio airplay in 2020, behind only "Blinding Lights" by The Weeknd.

In December 2020, Di-rect was given the annual Top 2000 award by NPO Radio 2, for being the highest entry on the country's yearly Top 2000 greatest songs of all time poll. "Soldier On" debuted at number 12, months after its release. "That each other's pain is seen and that there is a lot of empathy for a lot of people is wonderful," Veenendaal said about winning the award during the troubled times.

By April 2022, "Soldier On" recorded over 35 million streams on Spotify.

== Charts ==
=== Weekly charts ===
Weekly chart performance for "Soldier On"
Chart (2020)	Peak position
Netherlands (Dutch Top 40)	3
Netherlands (Single Top 100)	18

=== Yearly charts ===
Year-end chart performance for "Soldier On"
Chart (2020)	Position
Netherlands (Dutch Top 40)	20
Netherlands (Single Top 100)	44
