= Gregorio Nardi =

Italian pianist and musicologist

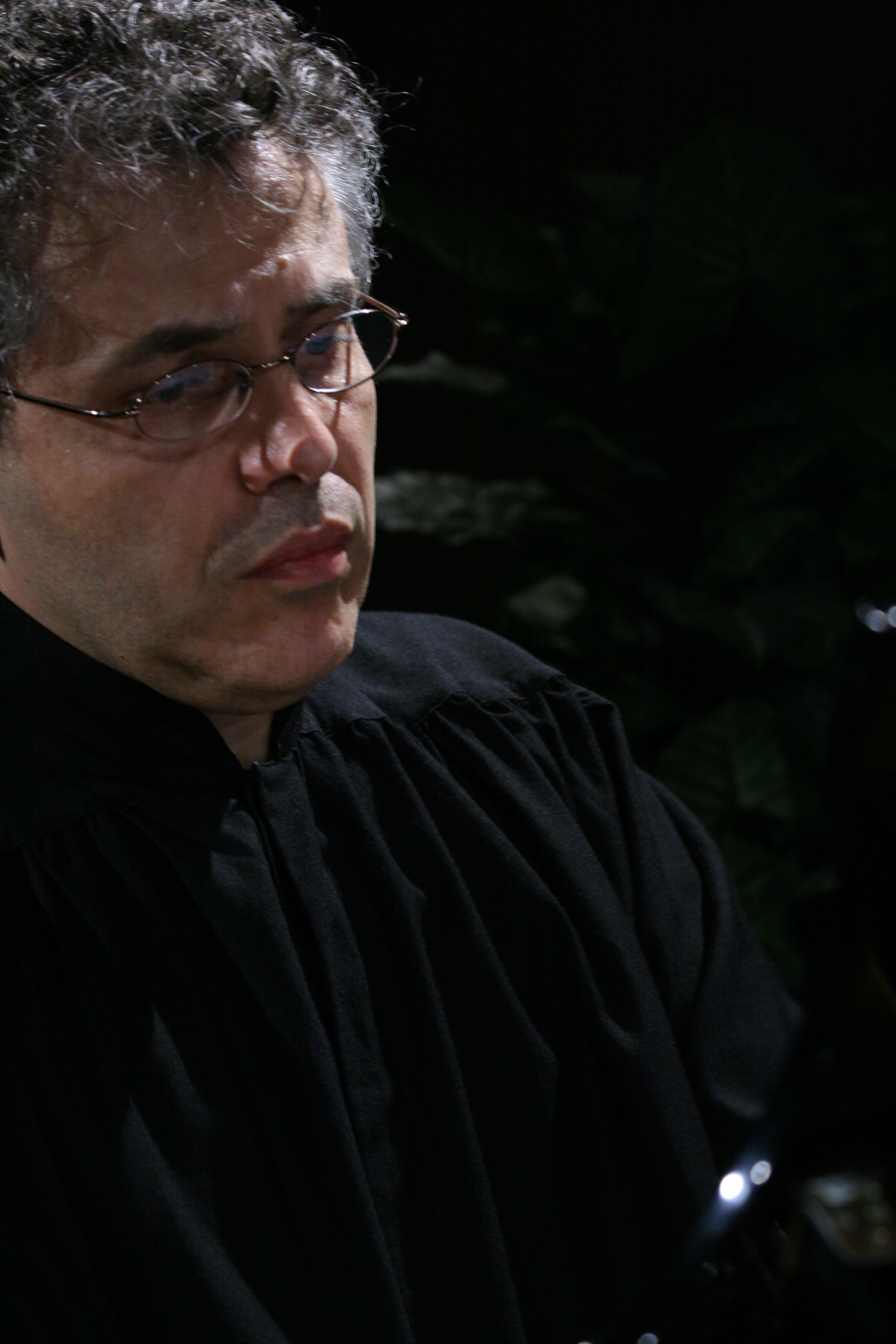
Gregorio Nardi

Gregorio Nardi (born February 3, 1964, in Florence) is an Italian pianist and musicologist.

== Life ==
Gregorio Nardi was born into a family of musicians and writers. He lives and works in the studio in Florence, who belonged to his maternal grandfather Piero Bargellini, mayor of the town in 1966–67, which became Casa della Memoria (Memorial House), and it is open for the public as a Museum.

Until 1987 he studied piano with his paternal grandparents, Rio Nardi and Gregoria Gobbi (a celebrated piano duo trained at the schools of Giuseppe Buonamici, Ernesto Consolo, Ferruccio Busoni); and, since 1980, with Wilhelm Kempff of whom he was the last pupil.

After the first successes at the international Artur Rubinstein Competition in Tel Aviv (1983) and Liszt Competition in Utrecht (1986), his concerts – broadcast on the radio and television and on the internet – took him to perform in four continents. He collaborated with singers (Suzanne Danco, Marianne Pousseur, Elena Zaremba, Roberto Abbondanza, Mark Padmore, Leonardo Wolovsky), with dancers and actors (Carla Fracci, Vladimir Vassiliev, Italo Dall’Orto, Lina Sastri, Ferruccio Soleri), violinists (Ilya Grubert, Günter Pichler, Tamsin Waley-Cohen, Renato Zanettovich), flautists (Michele Marasco), percussionists (Jonathan Faralli).

He performed with the Jerusalem Symphony Orchestra, the Orchestra Sinfonica of Sanremo, the Nederlands Philarmonisch Orkest, the Noordelijk Filarmonisch Orkest, the Het Gelders Orkest, the Frysk Orkest, the Limburgs Symphonie Orkest, the Orchestre de la RTL, the Deutsche Kammerakademie Neuss, the Brandenburger Symphoniker, Leeds Youth Symphony Orchestra, Orchestre de Saintes, Orchestra Academia Szczecin, National Academic Orchestra of Bucarest. He also developed his style in playing on ancient instruments, and was invited in France and in Italy by Philippe Herreweghe.

His first Lisztian recording – Réminiscences des Puritains – was chosen by J. Methuen-Campbell (Gramophone, 1990) among the best releases of the year. Since 1997 Nardi has realized under the Phoenix label two other Lisztian CDs – Composizioni Religiose; Vom Tode – and the first world recordings of unreleased compositions by the young Robert Schumann, by Ferdinand Hummel, by Arnold Schönberg, by Italian authors of the nineteenth century.

As a critic, he began his activity writing for the magazine CD Classica and for many years has written reviews and articles for the monthly magazine Musica, on topics of music history and historic piano interpretation, and about Jewish composers (also The Orel Foundation)). He taught master classes and university lectures, in Italy and Israel; lessons about Busoni and his pupils (Ecole Normale Supérieure de Musique, Paris 1994), on Schumann and the Romanticism (Scuola Normale Superiore, Pisa 2000 e 2001); lectures-recitals about Alberto Savinio (Düsseldorf International Conference, 2001; Lenbachhaus, Munich 2002; Kunstmuseum Winterthur, 2008), about Arnold Böcklin (Basel International Symposium, 2001), about Charles Ives (Syracuse University, Firenze 2004; Ecole Normale Supérieure, Paris 2005), about Brahmsian interpretation (Université Paris8, 2004).

Since 1994, for more than ten years, he was the artistic director of the Musical Society of Santa Cecilia in Crevole (Siena). He collaborates, since the foundation, with ICAMus (The International Center for American Music) for the promotion and diffusion of the American classical music. He is cofounder and artistic director of the FLAMEnsemble – a group of 22 soloists for contemporary music – and of the Florence Chamber Music Festival, who presented monographic concerts dedicated to Elliott Carter, Klaus Huber, George Crumb, Salvatore Sciarrino, Henri Pousseur, György Kurtág, György Ligeti, John Cage; and other events, with the participation among others of Klaus Huber e Younghi Pagh-Paan, Ursula e Heinz Holliger, Marianne Pousseur, Salvatore Sciarrino.

== Repertoire ==
Research of unpublished and unknown compositions has an important place in Nardi's work. A great success was obtained by his wide panoramas on the music of Jewish composers on the two last century, and the programmes dedicated to composers of the early Romanticism (Charles-Valentin Alkan, Juan Crisóstomo Arriaga, Ignaz Moscheles, George Pinto, Jan Václav Voříšek, Carl Maria von Weber ...). Nardi was the first interpreter of many masterpieces: the first version of the Concord Sonata by Charles Ives, 2 canons and a Klavierstück (Frei nach Schumann) by Johannes Brahms, 12 piano pieces by Hans Rott, 3 Etudes and 3 Preludes and Fugues by Busoni, 17 Fragmente by Schönberg, unreleased works by Alberto Savinio, 2 Intermezzi from the Ulisse by Luigi Dallapiccola transcribed by Franco Donatoni. In 2003, he performed for the first time the complete 18 songs of the Song-Book by George Gershwin, in the two versions with and without voice, reconstructed by Nardi through original evidences and records made by Gershwin himself. Many contemporary authors has written especially for Nardi, among them Luciano Berio, Henri Pousseur, Roman Vlad, Gwyn Pritchard, Andrea Cavallari.

Fundamental were his researches on the unpublished compositions of the young Schumann. According to the original manuscripts, Nardi played for the very first time as a world premiere the Fantaisies et Finale, Variations Pathétiques, Variationen über ein Thema von Ignaz Ferdinand Freiherr von Fricken, 6 unpublished variations on a theme by Beethoven, Variation zum Preziosamarsch (Weber), Variationen zum Glöckchenthema (Paganini), Sehnsuchtswalzervariationen (Schubert), 6 Fugues, 5 Canons, 6 Waltzes, 5 Papillotten, 2 Burle, Je ne suis q’un songe, Scènes Mignonnes, Capriccio, Ecossaise, Notturnino, Ballo, Burla, Fantaisie sovra un tema di quattro note; and the first unpublished versions of Quasi Variazioni, Sonata in sol minore, Papillons, Variations on the name "Abegg", Phantasiestücke op. 111.

== Recordings ==
Percorsi nel recital, Visioni oltre il repertorio, Vol. 5 Sonata in si bemolle op. 22 (Beethoven), Das Heimweh (Schuncke), Sonata in la minore D. 537 (Schubert), Tre Romanze (Luigi Ferdinando Casamorata), Variationen über das Motiv von Bach “Weinen, Klagen, Sorgen Zagen” (Liszt) [Cd Limenmusic 2019]

Percorsi nel recital, Visioni oltre il repertorio, Vol. 4 - Richard Wagner Elsa's Brautgang (Liszt), Im Treibhaus (Stradal), Pilgerchor (Godowsky), Gesang der Rheintöchter (Klindworth), Siegmund's Liebesgesang (Tausig), Schmerzen (Stradal), Tristan und Isolde (Jaëll), Parsifal (Buonamici), Gebet der Elisabeth (Godowsky), Albumblatt, Ankunft bei den Schwarzen Schwänen, Album-Sonate, Elegie, Elsa's Traum (Liszt) [Cd + DVD Limenmusic CDVD025C025]

Percorsi nel recital, Visioni oltre il repertorio, Vol. 3 - Beethoven Backstage Ludwig van Beethoven: 6 Bagatelle op. 126 - Klavierstücke e frammenti degli anni 1783-1800 - Quattro intermezzi per la Sonata in do min. op.10 n. 1 (1796-1799) - Frammenti, Klavierstücke e un'Anglaise del quaderno BH 114 (1793–94) - Frammenti e composizioni degli anni 1802-1810 - Klavierstücke e frammenti degli anni 1818-1827 [Cd + DVD LimenMusic CDVD038C038]

Percorsi nel recital, Visioni oltre il repertorio, Vol. 2 Franz Liszt: Fantasie und Fuge über das Thema B-A-C-H - Praeludium "Weinen, Klagen, Sorgen, Zagen" - Fréderéric Chopin: Ballade n. 1, op. 23 - Prelude op. 45 - Robert Schumann: Variationen über ein Thema von Ignaz Ferdinand Freiherr von Fricken - Ludwig van Beethoven: Praeludium - Sonata op. 110 [Cd + DVD LimenMusic CDVD024C024]

Percorsi nel recital, Visioni oltre il repertorio, Vol. 1 Luigi Cherubini : Capriccio, ou Etude pour le fortepiano - Franz Joseph Haydn : Capriccio Hob. XVII/1 - Sonata in Fa minore Hob. XVII/6 (Andante con Variazioni – Variationenen über die Hymne 'Gott erhalte' [Cd + DVD LimenMusic CDVD012C012]

Nächtliche Stimmen (Voci Notturne), Melodramen e Lieder- con Claudia Marie-Thérèse Hasslinger (mezzo-soprano e voce recitante). EMA Records 40012

Löffelholz-Lieder con il Baritono Leonardo Wolovsky. Lupi: Cinque canti trovadorici; Castelnuovo-Tedesco: Three sephardic songs; G. Nardi: Löffelholz-Lieder; Ibert: Chansons de Don Quichotte; Berg: Nun ich der Riesen; P. R. Nardi: Due melodie; Ives: Ich grolle nicht; Zangelmi: Die Brücke; Schönberg: Abschied. [Phoenix 00616]

Franz Liszt: Vom Tode su commissione della Heinrich-Heine-Universität-Düsseldorf. Erlkönig; Vom Tode; Funérailles; Chasse-Neige; Sunt Lacrymae rerum; Aux Cypres de la Villa d’Este I; Csárdás macabre; La lugubre Gondola I e II; Rapsodia Ungherese n. 17; Trauervorspiel und Trauermarsch. [Phoenix PH 99521]

Robert Schumann: Papillotten Schumann: 6 Walzer; Papillons Musicals; 5 canoni; 2 Burle; Papillons inediti; 5 Papillotten; Je ne suis q’un songe; Intermezzi op. 4; Papillons n. 2. Brahms: Frei nach Schumann; Papillon; Kreis-Kanon; Kanon. [Phoenix PH 05001]

Robert Schumann: Variations Pathétiques Variationen über ein Thema von Beethoven; Variations sur un Notturno de Chopin; Variationen zum Preziosamarsch (Weber); Variations Pathétiques; Variationen zum Glökchenthema (Paganini); Sehnsuchtswalzervariationen (Schubert); Sonata op. 22. [Phoenix PH 99522]

Robert Schumann: Fantaisies et Finales Fantaisies et Finale; Quasi Variazioni (prima versione); Impromptus op. 5 (prima versione). [Phoenix PH 98401]

Arnold Schönberg: 17 frammenti – Anton Webern: 5 composizioni Schönberg: 3 Klavierstücke, 17 Fragmente. Webern: Satz, Sonatensatz, Kinderstück, Klavierstück, Variationen op. 27. [Phoenix PH 99505]

Ferenc Liszt: le composizioni religiose per pianoforte 1 Invocation; Litanei; Variationen über das Thema Weinen, Klagen; Osterhymne; Via Crucis. [Phoenix PH 97312]

Ferenc Liszt: Réminiscences des Puritains, first recording, and other rare piano works Réminiscences des Puritains; Phantasie und Fuge über das Thema BACH; Variationen über das Thema Weinen, Klagen, Sorgen, Zagen; Berceuse. [Dynamic CDS 58]
