= Di-rect =

Dutch rock band

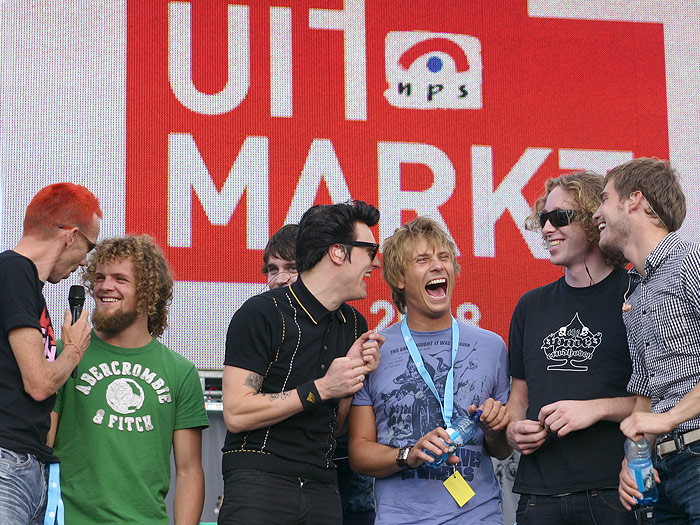
- Di-rect at Uitmarkt in 2008

Background information
- Origin: The Hague, South Holland, Netherlands
- Genres: Rock; pop rock; pop-punk (early)
- Years active: 1999–present
- Labels: EMI, 8ball
- Members: Marcel Veenendaal; Paul Jan Bakker; Frans "Spike" van Zoest; Bas van Wageningen; Jamie Westland
- Past members: Tim Akkerman; Vince van Reeken
- Website: www.di-rect.nl

Di-rect (stylised in uppercase) is a Dutch rock band from The Hague, formed in 1999. The band's current line-up consists of Jamie Westland (drums), Frans "Spike" van Zoest (guitar), Bas van Wageningen (bass), Paul Jan Bakker (guitar) and Marcel Veenendaal (lead vocals). The band has achieved nine top-ten singles and four number-one albums in the Netherlands.

From 1999 to 2009, Tim Akkerman was the band's lead vocalist. The band was commercially successful, scoring seven top ten singles on the Dutch Top 40 with Akkerman, but he left the band after four albums. The band held a televised reality show contest in search of the band's new singer, which Veenendaal won.

The band did not have the same success with Veenendaal originally until 2020, when the single "Soldier On" achieved widespread popularity in the Netherlands associated with the COVID-19 pandemic. It became the band's first top ten single in 13 years. In 2025, the band played the last three shows held at De Kuip in Rotterdam, to a total of 145,000 people.

== History ==
=== 1999–2000: Formation ===
Di-rect began in October 1999 when 15-year-old Jamie Westland asked his father Dick to help him set up a band. Three other teenagers joined him, the oldest being 19-year-old frontman Tim Akkerman. Within a few months, Di-rect completed a five-track demo which included the song "Just the Way I Do". 3FM radio DJ Rob Stenders saw them play live and was impressed by them. He played a song from their demo on national radio, and this generated considerable interest by record companies. Two months later Di-rect signed with Dino Music/EMI.

Bassist Bas van Wageningen came up with the band name. It was originally spelled Direct, but the band added a hyphen because the internet domain "www.direct.com" was not available.

=== 2001–2008: Success with Akkerman ===
In 2001, the band released "Just the Way I Do", followed by their debut album Discover. "Just the Way I Do" became the band's first charting single in May 2001, eventually peaking at No. 24 on the Dutch Top 40. The album's third single, "Inside My Head", became the band's first top ten hit in the Netherlands, peaking at No. 8 in March 2002. The music video for the song featured Dutch gymnast Renske Endel, who had just won the silver medal at the 2001 World Artistic Gymnastics Championships. That summer, they were also invited to appear at the Pinkpop and Parkpop festivals. The album was certified Gold in the Netherlands by January 2003. At the 2003 Edison Awards, "Inside My Head" won Single of the Year.

The band's second album Over the Moon was released in 2003. Its first two singles, "Adrenaline" and "She" were both top ten hits, and "She" was the band's biggest hit yet, reaching No. 2 on the Dutch Top 40. That year, Di-rect performed at the Museumplein in Amsterdam for Koninginnedag and signed a sponsorship contract with Pepsi in June. De Volkskrant noted in 2003 that Di-rect was "popular (especially among girls)" and wrote "punky pop songs". The following singles from the album "Rollercoaster" and "Don't Kill Me Tonight" both reached the charts, but were less successful. Akkerman sang on "Als je iets kan doen", a charity single released under Artiesten voor Azië in relief for the 2004 Indian Ocean earthquake and tsunami.

Di-rect's third album, All Systems Go!, debuted at number one on the Dutch Albums Chart in February 2005, the band's first to do so. The lead single, "Hungry for Love", was a cover of a song by Alistair Griffin and reached No. 3 in the Netherlands. Two further singles, "Cool Without You" and "Webcam Girl", also reached the top 10, and "Blind for You", featuring the classical pianist Wibi Soerjadi, made No. 13. In September 2005, Di-rect competed against the Belgian band Nailpin in the Dutch MTV show Road Rally, where they had to travel from California to New York City with one full tank of gas in a van and no other expenses paid for, needing to schedule their own concerts along the way in order to make money to complete the journey.

In February 2007, vocalist Tim Akkerman's first child, a daughter, was born. He married his girlfriend soon after in July 2007. On 9 April, Di-rect released "A Good Thing", the lead single for the band's self-titled fourth album. It peaked at No. 2 on the Dutch Top 40. The album was released in March 2007, but the remaining singles from the record were not great successes.

In 2008, Di-rect was approached by Jan Rot for doing a theatre tour performing Tommy, the rock opera by The Who. Di-rect, being huge Who fans, were skeptical because the lyrics were translated to Dutch. They found that Rot made an excellent translation and thus started the project "Di-rect doet Tommy" (Di-rect does Tommy).

=== 2009–2019: Change of frontman ===
In March 2009, Tim Akkerman announced that he would leave Di-rect. The band's last show with Akkerman took place on 10 April 2009 at the Oude Luxor Theater in Rotterdam, featuring the band performing Tommy. The rest of the band expressed public disappointment in Akkerman's decision. Drummer Jamie Westland said, "We always wanted to be the new Golden Earring and that may never happen now. We are taking a big step back with this."

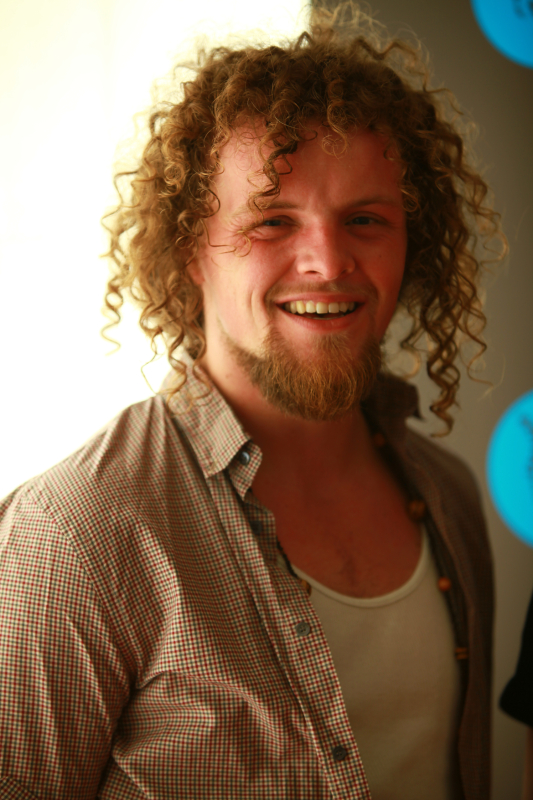
Veenendaal in 2010

On November 8, in the live finale of the nationally televised BNN program Wie is Direct? (English: Who is Di-rect?), the band made a unanimous decision to bring on Marcel Veenendaal from Arnhem as their new lead vocalist and frontman. The contest saw four different candidates perform against each other in three live shows at the Paard van Troje in The Hague. The single "Times Are Changing" was also debuted as Veenendaal's first song with them. The band also announced that keyboardist Vince van Reeken would also be a permanent member.

"Times Are Changing" peaked at No. 11 on the Dutch Top 40. The band had a few minor hits soon after, but failed to chart a single for the next seven years after "Where We Belong" reached No. 24 in 2013. In 2014, the band's seventh album Daydreams in a Blackout became their first to reach number one on the Dutch Albums Chart in nine years.

In 2017, Akkerman admitted that people involved with the band paid money to give Di-rect higher chart positions on the Dutch Top 40, revealing that "there were agencies that could buy hits". He claimed the band was unaware of it at the time and said he felt the band's success was devalued because of it.

In 2018, Di-rect performed at Pinkpop Festival for the first time in 13 years, taking over for The Kooks on the main stage as a last-minute substitution because their singer Luke Pritchard was too ill to play.

=== 2020–present: Chart comeback ===
In 2020, the band had a 'comeback hit' with "Soldier On", which became the band's first top ten single in 13 years after gaining attention as an anthem of hope during the COVID-19 lockdown in the Netherlands. In 2022, Di-rect scored a ninth top ten single with "Through the Looking Glass", which was their second such hit with Veenendaal as lead vocalist.

To celebrate the band's 25th anniversary, Di-rect announced its largest concerts yet with three shows at De Kuip in Rotterdam from 12 to 14 June 2025. Because the band sold 100,000 tickets within the first hour, a third show was added. They were the last concerts held at De Kuip before the stadium's ban on concerts begins in 2026. It was reported that 145,000 people attended the concerts in total. The band released a live album from the shows, Live in De Kuip, in September 2025, which debuted at No. 1 on the Dutch Albums Chart. In October 2026, Di-rect released their 11th studio album, I: Keep the Fire On. It debuted at No. 1 in the Netherlands.

== Music and image ==
With the band's original singer Tim Akkerman, Di-rect's music was described as pop rock and pop-punk. Since Marcel Veenendaal became the band's vocalist in 2009, their music has taken a turn towards stadium rock and classic rock influences. 3voor12 wrote that Veenendaal is "a much better singer" who "also made the band a lot more mature." Het Parool said in 2017 that "They used to be a kind of boy band with guitars. Nowadays they are a serious rock group."

Bassist Bas van Wageningen recalled in 2022 that, "At one point, we were on average ten years older than our audience. We had a boy band label. It wasn't exactly cool for a guy to have a Di-rect CD in his collection, so to speak. When Mars [Veenendaal] joined, we decided not to be too uptight about our image as a band. After that, we suddenly managed to reach the 'festival-goer'."

== Band members ==
- Marcel Veenendaal – lead vocals (2009–present)
- Frans "Spike" van Zoest – guitars, backing vocals (1999–present)
- Paul Jan Bakker – guitars (2016–present)
- Bas van Wageningen – bass guitar (1999–present)
- Jamie Westland – drums (1999–present)

=== Former members ===
- Tim Akkerman – lead vocals, guitars (1999–2009)
- Vince van Reeken – keyboards (2009–2016)

== Discography ==
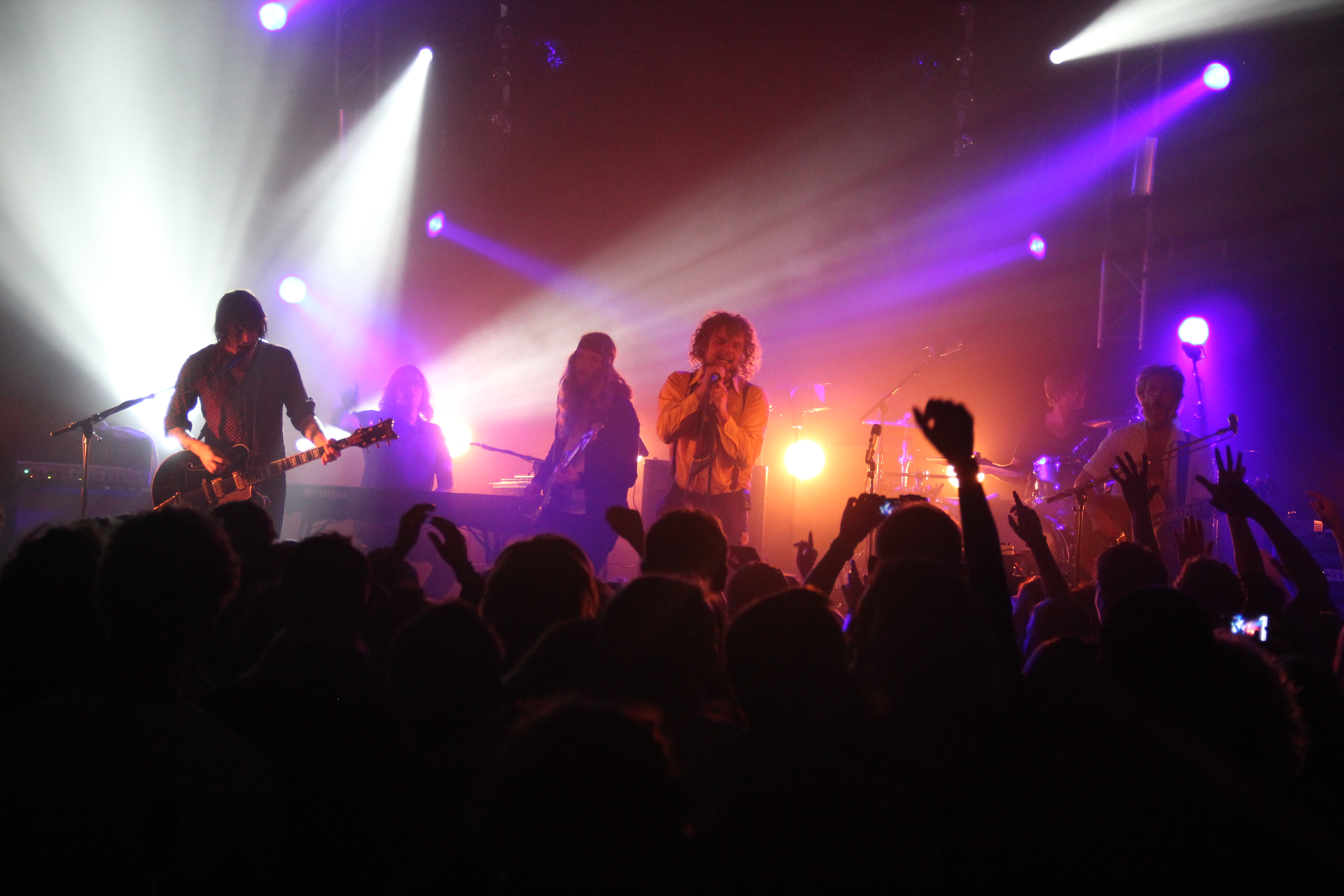
Di-rect in Poppodium Apollo (2012)

=== Albums ===
Studio albums

Year	Album	Peak positions
Year	Album	NED
2001	Discover	14
2003	Over the Moon	2
2005	All Systems Go!	1
2007	Di-rect	2
2010	This Is Who We Are	3
2011	Time Will Heal Our Senses	6
2014	Daydreams in a Blackout	1
2017	Rolling with the Punches	6
2020	Wild Hearts	2
2024	Sphinx	2
2026	I: Keep the Fire On	1

Live albums

Year	Album	Peak positions
Year	Album	NED
2008	Live & Acoustic	14
2023	Residentie Orkest Sessions	6
2025	Live in de Kuip	1

Joint albums

Year	Album	Peak positions
Year	Album	NED
2008	Di-rect doet Tommy	53

=== Singles ===
Year	Single	Peak chart positions			Album
Year	Single	NED Dutch Top 40	NED Tip	NED Single Top 100	Album
2001	"Just the Way I Do"	24		36	Discover
2001	"My Generation"	—	4	21	Discover
2002	"Inside My Head"	8		14	Discover
2002	"Free (To Change the World)"	14		14	Discover
2002	"Adrenaline"	10		11	Over the Moon
2003	"She"	2		3	Over the Moon
2003	"Rollercoaster"	27		31	Over the Moon
2003	"Don't Kill Me Tonight"	21		41	Over the Moon
2005	"Hungry for Love"	4		6	All Systems Go!
2005	"Cool Without You"	4		15	All Systems Go!
2005	"Webcam Girl"	10		7	All Systems Go!
2005	"Blind for You" (featuring Wibi Soerjadi)	13		7	All Systems Go!
2007	"A Good Thing"	2		3	Di-rect
2007	"I Just Can't Stand"	36		38	Di-rect
2007	"Johnny"	26		2	Di-rect
2007	"Bring Down Tomorrow"	—	2	72	Di-rect
2008	"I Forget Your Name"	—	3	42	
2009	"Times Are Changing"	11		2	This Is Who We Are
2010	"This Is Who We Are"	15		4	This Is Who We Are
2010	"Hold On"	23		69	This Is Who We Are
2010	"Natural High"	28		—	This Is Who We Are
2011	"The Chase"	22		27	Time Will Heal Our Senses
2011	"Young Ones"	26		97	Time Will Heal Our Senses
2012	"Long Way Home"	—	3	—	Time Will Heal Our Senses
2012	"Holiday"	—	16	—	Time Will Heal Our Senses
2012	"Say Something"	—	16	—	Time Will Heal Our Senses
2013	"Where We Belong" (Fedde le Grand and Di-rect)	24		44	Daydreams in a Blackout
2014	"Invincible"	—	4	99	Daydreams in a Blackout
2014	"Paper Plane"	—	10	—	Daydreams in a Blackout
2017	"Crazy Madonna"	—	22		Rolling with the Punches
2019	"Devil Don't Care"	—	1		Nothing to Lose EP
2019	"Be Strong"	—	17		Nothing to Lose EP
2019	"Nothing to Lose"	—	—		Nothing to Lose EP
2020	"Soldier On"	3		18	Wild Hearts
2020	"Color"	32			Wild Hearts
2021	"Wild Hearts"	—	11		Wild Hearts
2022	"Through the Looking Glass"	8		43	Sphinx
2022	"90s Kid"	24		– (Note: "90s Kid" did not enter the Dutch Single Top 100, but peaked at number two on the Single Tip chart.)	Sphinx
2023	"How My Heart Was Won"	26		65	Sphinx
2023	"OMG It's Happening"	27		– (Note: "OMG It's Happening" did not enter the Dutch Single Top 100, but peaked at number nine on the Single Tip chart.)	Sphinx
2024	"My Blood"	18		73	Sphinx
2024	"Wastelands"	37		—	Sphinx
2026	"Won't Fall"	26		—	I: Keep the Fire On
2026	"My Friend"	14		67	I: Keep the Fire On

Others

- 2005: "Als je iets kan doen" (in formation Artiesten voor Azië) (NED: #1)
