= Yury Favorin =

Yury Favorin Юрий Владимирович Фаворин
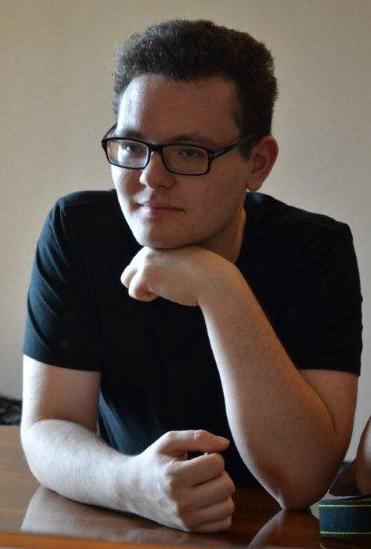

Background information
- Born: 17 December 1986 (age 39); Moscow, Soviet Union
- Genres: Classical
- Occupation: Pianist
- Instruments: Piano

Yury Favorin (Russian: Ю́рий Влади́мирович Фаво́рин; born 17 December 1986, in Moscow) is a Russian pianist.

== Life and career ==
Yury Favorin studied in Moscow at the Gnesins High School of Music. From 2004 to 2009, he studied piano at the Moscow Conservatory with professor M.S. Voskresensky.

He took part at the Academy of the Festival Verbier (Switzerland, 2011), and the International Holland Music Sessions (TIHMS) (The Netherlands, 2011).

== Prizes ==
- The 1st Nikolay Rubinstein Competition for Young Pianists (Moscow), 1st prize (Moscow, 2001)
- Gyorgy Cziffra Foundation, 1st prize (Wien, Austria, 2003)
- Andrey Petrov All-Russia Prize for Young Composers (“Crystal Tuning Fork”)

== CDs ==
- Queen Elisabeth Competition of Belgium. Piano 2010. 3 CDs + Encore:

CD 1 — F. Liszt. Concerto n. 1 in E flat major
CD 2 — J.-L. Fafchamps. Back to the Sound
Encore — F. Schubert. Sonata in E flat major D 568

- Anthology of the Russian Piano Music. Vol. 1 (1917–1991)

CD 1: Nikolay Myaskovsky. Sonata no. 3, op. 19 (1920) ("Kapellmeister", studio-recording 2010)

- Nikolay Medtner: Complete Piano Sonatas. In 4 CDs

CD 4: Sonata e-moll "Night Wind", op. 25 no. 2 (Moscow State Conservatory, live 2009)

- Franz Liszt: Harmonies poétiques et religieuses (Muso Label, 2013)
- It Don’t Mean a Thing (with Alexei Sysoyev and Konstantin Sukhan, Creative Sources, 2014)
- Alexei Sysoyev: Selene (2 CD, Fancy Music, 2015)
- Prokofiev, Popov, Shostakovich, Rebikov, Feinberg (Melodiya, 2016)
- Sergei Prokofiev, 2 violin sonatas, 5 melodies (with Aylen Pritchin, Melodiya, 2017)
- Charles-Valentin Alkan: Piano works (Muso Label, 2017)
- Franz Liszt: Années de pèlerinage (Live, 3 CD, Melodiya, 2021)
- Sound Review 3: Boris Tishchenko, Nikolai Sidelnikov (Melodiya, 2022)
- Sergei Prokofiev, 6th Piano Sonata (Meshina Records, 2025)
- Gennady Banshchikov, 5 Piano Sonatas (Melodiya, 2025)
