= Parkpop =

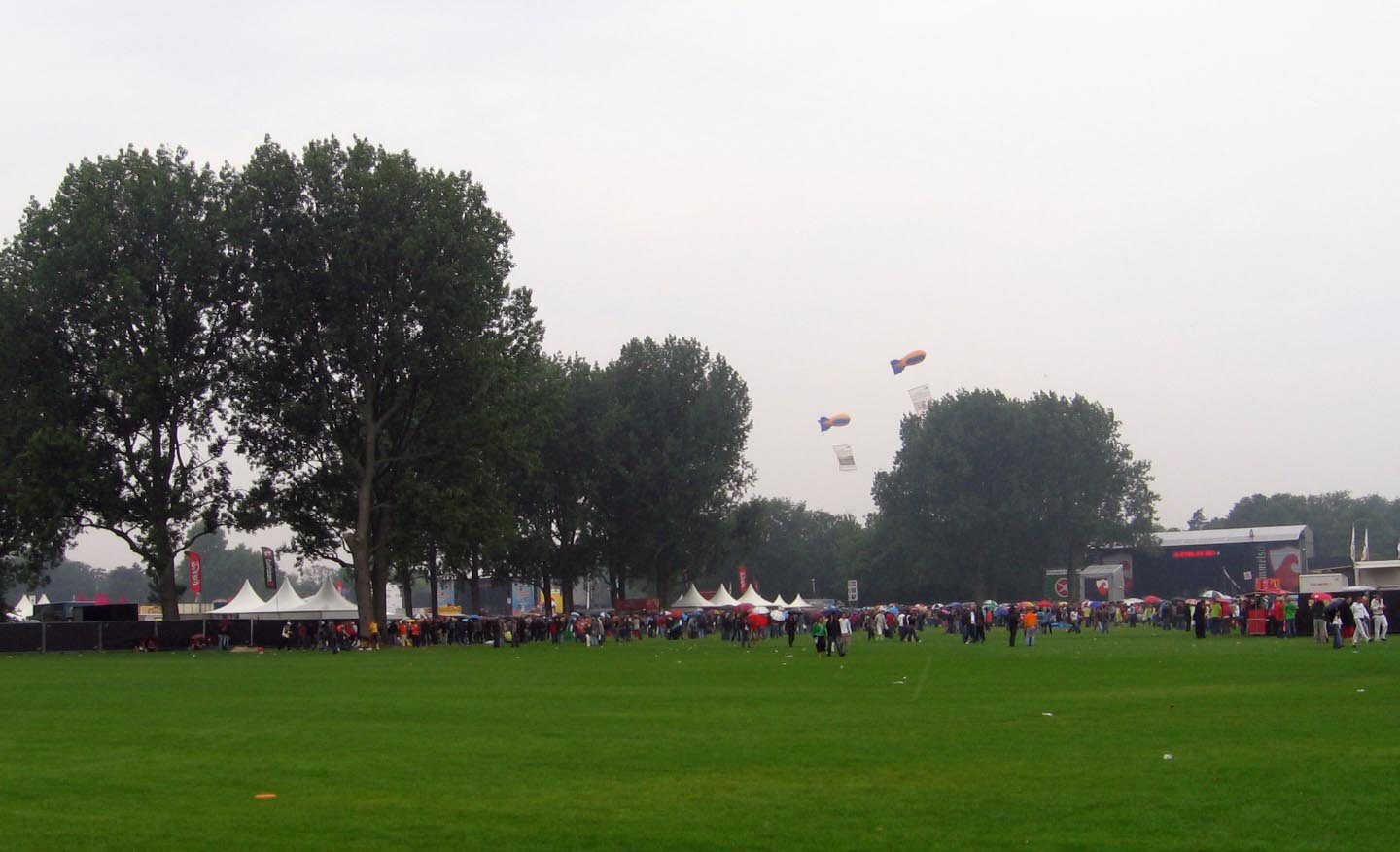
Parkpop 2006

Parkpop festival was a free music festival held annually on the last Sunday of June in the city of The Hague, Netherlands.

It was first held in 1981 and was attended by 35,000 visitors. Parkpop held the title for the largest free pop festival in Europe for a long time. However, other festivals also claim this title. Przystanek Woodstock in Poland and Austria's Donauinselfest now claim to be the second biggest music festival in Europe, second only to Radio 1's Big Weekend in the United Kingdom.

The 31st edition of Parkpop was held on Sunday 26 June 2011.

== History ==
=== 2010 ===
The 30th edition of Parkpop, was held 27 June and featured Alphabeat, Nick Lowe, Nena, Danko Jones, Juliette Lewis and Alpha Blondy. As local authorities forbade rapper Snoop Dogg from performing - it would require extra security measures because of gang rivalry - and first replacement Beenie Man was cancelled by Parkpop because of his gay-unfriendly reputation, Alpha Blondy performing as the closing act. Edition 2010 was a huge success, with 250.000 visitors.

=== 2009 ===
The 29th edition of Parkpop was held Sunday 28 June and featured: Ed Kowalczyk (Live), Boris, Skatalites, The Pretenders, Milow, Sabrina Starke, Dio & Sef, Maikal X, Guus Meeuwis, Buzzcocks, Dana Fuchs Band, Habib Koite & Bamada and Magic System a.o. Good weather and about 275.000 visitors.

=== 2008 ===
The 28th edition of Parkpop took place on Sunday 29 June 2008 and featured Kula Shaker, Jason Mraz, Monte Montgomery, Orishas, Moke, Mala Vita, Kleine Jay and was headlined by Sheryl Crow. Visitors 250.000.

=== 2007 ===
The 27th edition of Parkpop took place on Sunday 24th 2007 and featured Kim Wilde, Maria Mena and Johan.

=== 2006 ===
The 26th edition featured The Kooks, Kelis, Ronnie Spector, Garland Jeffreys and was headlined by Di-rect and Melanie C.

With heavy rain that year the number of visitors was 175,000.

=== 2005 ===
The 25th edition featured De Dijk, Typhoon, Elvis Costello & the Imposters and was headlined by Within Temptation

Attendance: 350,000

=== 2004 ===
The 24th edition of Parkpop on 27 June 2004 featured The Gathering, Beth Hart, The Nits, Outlandish and was headlined by The Stranglers

Attendance: 350,000

=== 2003 ===
Line-up of this edition 23: 16 Down, A Day's Work, An Pierle & White Velvet Luka Bloom Blues Brother Castro, Brainpower, Corey, De La Soul, Kathleen Edwards, Fools Fatal, Kouwe Makkers, Morgan Heritage, Ozomatli, Rapid Notion, Silverlake, Ska-p, VanKatoen, Wowbeggar, Krezip, Youssou N'Dour

=== 2002 ===
The 22nd edition of Parkpop on 30 June 2002 featured Bintangs, The Dandy Warhols, Enrico Riva, Hans Vandenburg, Kareem Raihani, Kirsten, Levellers, Mimezine, Ozark Henry, Suzanne Vega and was headlined by three popular Dutch bands Kane, Di-rect and Within Temptation.

Attendance: 400,000

=== 2001 ===
The 21st edition of Parkpop featured Venice among others.
