= 16 Down =

- Origin: Zwolle, Netherlands
- Genres: Alternative rock, Rock music, Pop music
- Years active: 1997–present
- Labels: EMI, Dino Music, Flow Records

16 Down (sometimes stylized as 16Down) is an alternative pop rock band from Zwolle, Netherlands founded in 1997. The band has released three albums and had three charting singles.

== History ==
16 Down was formed in 1997 by the remaining members of the Prodigal Sons.

Jeroen Hobert, Marco Hovius and Arjan Pronk formed the band After Dust, later renaming themselves 16 Down.

16 Down recorded the first demo starting February 1997 and did live performances all over the Netherlands from the start of that year.

Hovius composer all songs and also developed his producing and arranging skills at that time. Arjan en Jeroen were a solid rhythm and bass team.

In March 2001, the release of the single "Subtle Movements" earned the band media attention and chart success in The Netherlands and a spot at Lowlands 2001, a 3-day festival with over 57,000 tickets sold.

Their debut album Headrush (2001) and its second single "Heaven Still Cries" followed, garnering more chart success for the band. The album's third single "If The Money's Right" featured guest vocals by Rudeboy of Urban Dance Squad and was used by Pepsi in a television commercial.

In 2002, 16 Down participated in the Marlboro Flashback Tour series, performing a full set of Radiohead songs in a number of cities across the Netherlands.

In the spring of 2003, 16 Down joined Anouk on her sold-out 17-date tour for her album Graduated Fool.Also in that year the band did performances at the Parkpop and Bospop festivals .

Before the release of the band's sophomore album, founding member Hobert left the band because the touring and work schedule was too hard to cope with.Adrian Pronk the bassplayer was still present in the studio but left the band halfway the Fishbowl tour leaving Hovius in financial trouble that he resolved by finding new session musicians for the rest of the tour.

Life in a Fishbowl was preceded by the release of its lead single "The Day That I Met You" before being released in October 2003.

16 Down's third album F.L.O. was released at Paradiso in Amsterdam in 2007. A tour of 60 concerts followed in 2008 and 2009.

In 2011, frontman Marco Hovius built his own studio using money he made re-singing a Beck's Beer advertising song. There, he records and produces his own and other bands' music.

16 Down still performs live, and new concerts are planned for 2026. New songs have been performed live but have not yet been released on records or online streaming platforms.

== Discography ==
Albums

Year	Album	NL
2001	Headrush	95
2003	Life In A Fishbowl	—
2007	F.L.O.	77

Singles

Year	Single	NL	Album
2001	"Subtle Movements"	67	Headrush
2001	"Heaven Still Cries"	87	Headrush
2001	"If The Money's Right"	—	Headrush
2002	"Torn"	—	Headrush
2003	"The Day That I Met You"	84	Life In A Fishbowl
2007	"Cold" (promo)	—	F.L.O.
2007	"River" (promo)	—	F.L.O.
