= Evelina Vorontsova =

Russian pianist (born 1972)

- Born: 19 April 1972 (age 53); Moscow, Russia
- Genres: Classical
- Instrument: Piano
- Website: www.evelinavorontsova.com

Evelina Vorontsova (Russian: Эвелина Воронцова; born 19 April 1972, in Moscow) is a Russian/Dutch concert pianist and pedagogue.

== Biography ==
Evelina Vorontsova studied under Rudolf Kehrer, Mikhail Voskresensky, Elena Kuznetsova at the Moscow Conservatory and graduated with a Gold Medal (1993). After she received the 2nd prize at the International Franz Liszt Piano Competition, her studies were continued under Jan Wijn. Having made her orchestral debut at the age of 11 with J.S. Bach's Concerto IV in A major, BWV 1055. she has played in various countries as Japan, Germany and France. Aside from her concert career, she leads the foundation ArtiMusica, which initiates projects that merge different artistic disciplines.

== Competition prizes ==
- 4th prize Rachmaninoff competition (1990), special prize for best performance of the Preludes and Etudes-Tableaux
- 2nd prize International Franz Liszt Piano Competition (1992)
- 1st prize Concorso Internazionale per Pianoforte e Orchestra (2006)
- 2nd prize Concorso Internazionale di Esecuzione Musicale (2007) with special prize Primio Virtuosite prize

== Discography ==
- 2002 Bach, Scarlatti, Franck, Tchaikovsky, Chopin & Scriabin
- 2016 Rachmaninoff: Piano Sonata No.2 Op.31, Corelli Variations Op.42, Moments Musicaux Op.16
