= Through the Looking Glass (song) =

2022 song by Di-rect

Single by Di-rect

from the album Sphinx
- Released: 1 April 2022
- Length: 3:49
- Label: 8ball
- Songwriters: Niels Zuiderhoek; Marcel Veenendaal; Frans van Zoest; Jamie Westland; Bas van Wageningen; Paul Jan Bakker; Guus van der Steen
- Producers: Zuiderhoek; Di-rect

Di-rect singles chronology
"Wild Hearts" (2021)	"Through the Looking Glass" (2022)	"90s Kid" (2022)

"Through the Looking Glass" is a song by Dutch rock band Di-rect. It was released on 1 April 2022 as the lead single from the band's tenth studio album Sphinx.

The song peaked at No. 8 on the Dutch Top 40, becoming the band's ninth top-ten hit. Writing on the song began in 2014, but its lyrics focused on the turbulent times in recent history. Several critics compared the song to the American band The War on Drugs.

== Background ==
Guitarist Frans "Spike" van Zoest began writing "Through the Looking Glass" in 2014. He finished one verse and then shelved it until the band finally completed writing the song eight years later. Van Zoest said that it was just "gathering dust".

Van Zoest explained the lyrics as being about "a metaphor for how we've had to look at the world in recent years", inspired by the COVID-19 pandemic in the Netherlands. "You know, you see something familiar, but the streets are empty, the pubs are quiet, the restaurants are closed. Fortunately, there is now a period coming up when we can get together again and enjoy music."

== Reception ==
Dutch music critics compared the music of "Through the Looking Glass" to The War on Drugs. 3voor12 even called it "a shameless ripoff of The War on Drugs, but a very good one." They commented that Di-rect "are no longer the compact pop-punk group of their youth ... in the last few years they have taken on the guise of a very serious indie rock band." Di-rect had previously covered The War on Drugs' song "Red Eyes" for a Top 2000 radio session in 2020.

== Commercial performance ==
In August 2022, it entered the top ten of the Dutch Top 40 and ultimately peaked at No. 8, becoming the band's ninth top-ten hit and their second with Marcel Veenendaal as Di-rect's lead singer. They became the twelfth Dutch band to record nine top-ten singles.

For the year of 2022, it was the third-most played song in the Netherlands by radio airplay, and the most-played song on the radio by a Dutch artist.

== Personnel ==
=== Di-rect ===
- Marcel Veenendaal – lead vocals
- Frans "Spike" van Zoest – guitars, backing vocals
- Paul Jan Bakker – guitars
- Bas van Wageningen – bass guitar
- Jamie Westland – drums

=== Additional personnel ===
- Matteo Iannella – keyboards
- Louk Boudesteijn – trombone
- Guido Nijs – baritone saxophone

== Charts ==
=== Weekly charts ===
Weekly chart performance for "Through the Looking Glass"
Chart (2022)	Peak position
Netherlands (Dutch Top 40)	8
Netherlands (Single Top 100)	41

=== Yearly charts ===
Year-end chart performance for "Through the Looking Glass"
Chart (2022)	Position
Netherlands (Dutch Top 40)	26
