= Mikhail Voskresensky =

Russian pianist (born 1935)

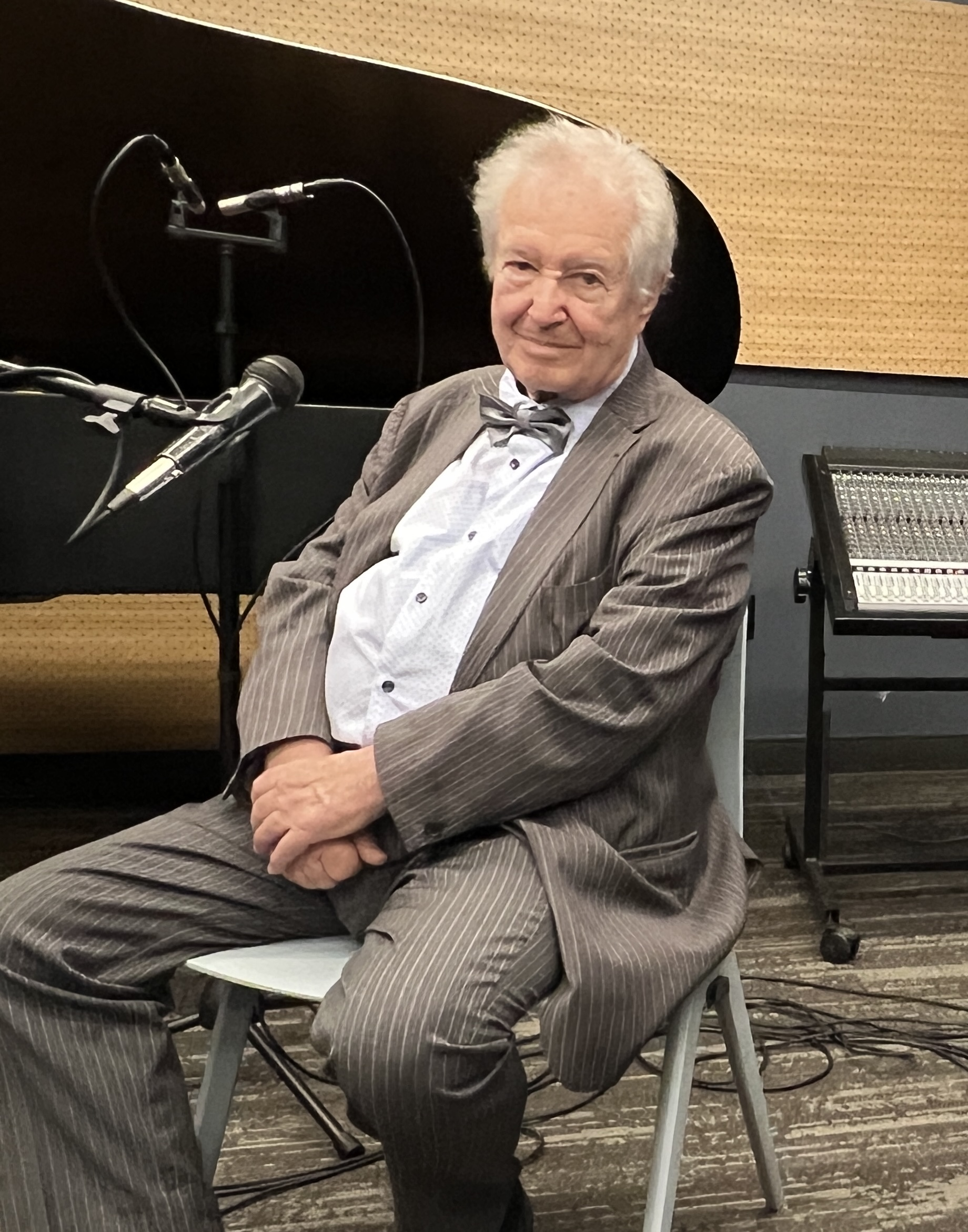
Mikhail Voskresensky in January 2024

Mikhail Voskresensky (Russian: Михаи́л Серге́евич Воскресенский; born on June 25, 1935, in Berdiansk, Ukrainian SSR, Soviet Union) is a Russian pianist and music pedagogue who left Russia for the United States in 2022 protesting against Russian invasion of Ukraine.

== Training ==
Mikhail Voskresensky is known internationally as a pianist in the great Romantic tradition. He graduated from the Moscow Conservatory in 1958, where he studied under Ilya Klyachko, Boris Zemliansky, Yakov Milstein, Lev Oborin (piano) and Leonid Roizman (organ). As student of the famous Lev Oborin, the winner of the First International Chopin Piano Competition in 1927, Voskresensky was influenced by his teacher's refined taste and romanticism in his deployment of pianistic sonorities. His playing shows a thorough command of contrasting musical colors, never disharmonious, and a legato technique drawing forth a singing voice from the instrument.

Some early reviews convey an impression of his technique: "The pianist reaches down to the great depths of music. His playing is poetic... It has a filigree quality in the right places, and he plays dramatic passages with a dynamic force and courage. Recorded by Voskresensky, Chopin's Nocturnes are performed with a distinct evenness." (Ruch muzyczny, Poland). "He is a courageous and powerful pianist. His playing is permeated with much feeling and his sound is melodious, clear and pure like a crystal." (Correio Paolistano, Brazil).

== Awards ==
In 1957, Voskresensky took part in the Prague Spring International Music Festival where he performed the European premiere of Shostakovich's second Piano Concerto in the presence of the composer. In 1966, he was honored with the Merited Artist of Russia award and, in 1989, that of the People's Artist of Russia. He is a prize-winner of the Schumann International Competition in Berlin (1956), the International Competition in Rio de Janeiro (1957), the George Enescu International Piano Competition in Bucharest (1958) and the Van Cliburn International Piano Competition in Fort Worth (1962).

== Concert geography ==
Mikhail Voskresensky's concert career has taken him to many parts of the world. He has performed with more than 150 conductors in almost all the countries of Europe, in Japan, Korea, China, Australia, US, Mexico, Cuba, Kenya, Zimbabwe and Peru. He received wonderful reviews in international festivals in Tours, Colmar and Aix-en-Provence ('Voskresensky is not only an outstanding virtuoso, he lives in music and plunges into its depths...' - Semaines Musicales, Tours). When making his New York début his performances of the Liszt Sonata and Scriabin's 5th Sonata were highly esteemed. His colleagues in chamber music were the Borodin Quartet, the Shostakovich Quartet, the Tokyo Quartet in New York, violinists M. Yashvili (with whom he performed all the violin sonatas of Beethoven in the 2004-05 season), R. Nodel and P. Berman, and 'cellists E. Altman and Alexander Kniazev. Voskresensky's large repertoire includes all the Beethoven sonatas, the complete works of Chopin, and 64 piano concerti which he has performed under conductors including John Pritchard, Franz Konwitschny, Kurt Masur, Stanisław Skrowaczewski, Evgeny Svetlanov, Charles Dutoit and others. He has recorded more than 50 CDs.

== Students ==
Until his escape from Russia, Mikhail Voskresensky was a professor at the Moscow Conservatory, the chair of the professorship of piano faculty. His pupils have won 126 international prizes including 55 gold medals, including among them Stanislav Igolinsky, Amir Tebenikhin, Tamriko Siprashvili, Temirzhan Yerzhanov, Alexey Talanov, Yakov Kasman, Alexander Ghindin, Sergei Koudriakov, Sergei Kuznezov, Evelina Vorontsova, Elena Kuznetsova, Mikhail Yanovitsky, Kooryeong Park, Oleg Marshev, Yury Favorin, Varvara Nepomnyaschaya, Sergey Neller, Galina Chistyakova, Kyohei Sorita and others.

From 2001 to 2004, Professor Voskresensky taught in Toho Gakuen School of Music in Tokyo where his pupils won 12 different prizes, including Akiko Yamamoto's triumph at the Schumann International Competition in Zwickau in 2004. Mikhail Voskresensky has acted as a competition juror in Sydney, London, Leeds, Geneva, Hamamatsu, Tel Aviv, Los Angeles and many other places. He was jury member of the XIII (2007) and XIV (2011) International Tchaikovsky Competitions and he was the president of the jury for the XIV International Piano Concours (founded by Igor Lazko) at the Conservatoire Russe Alexandre Scriabin in Paris in 2014.

== Oborin centenary ==
He played the First Concerto by Shostakovich in Beijing and the First Concerto by Tchaikovsky in Shanghai under the bâton of Charles Dutoit. In the autumn of 2007, during the centenary celebration for his teacher Lev Oborin, Voskresensky played the Beethoven Fourth Concerto under the baton of Vladimir Ashkenazy and the Brahms Second Concerto under Leonid Nikolaev in the Great Hall of Moscow Conservatory.

== Mozart Concerto Series ==
On 2 June 2010, Voskresensky completed his Mozart Piano Concerto Series; over the period of three years, all 27 Mozart piano concertos were performed and recorded live in the Maly (Small) Hall of Moscow Conservatory with the Pavel Slobodsky Centre Orchestra or Moscow Chamber Orchestra, 16 of the concerti being under the direction of maestro Leonid Nikolaev (1940-2009), and 11 under that of Konstantin Maslyuk. The concerti for two pianos, K 365, and for three pianos, K 242, with pianists Stanislav Igolinsky and Anastasia Gamaley, were recorded live at the Great Hall of the Moscow Conservatoire on 19 April 2010. The complete series has now been released on 10 CDs, available separately or as a boxed set. In September 2011, Voskresensky received the ‘Prize of Moscow City’ for the performance and recording of all concertos of Mozart.
