= Lucas and Arthur Jussen =

Dutch piano duo

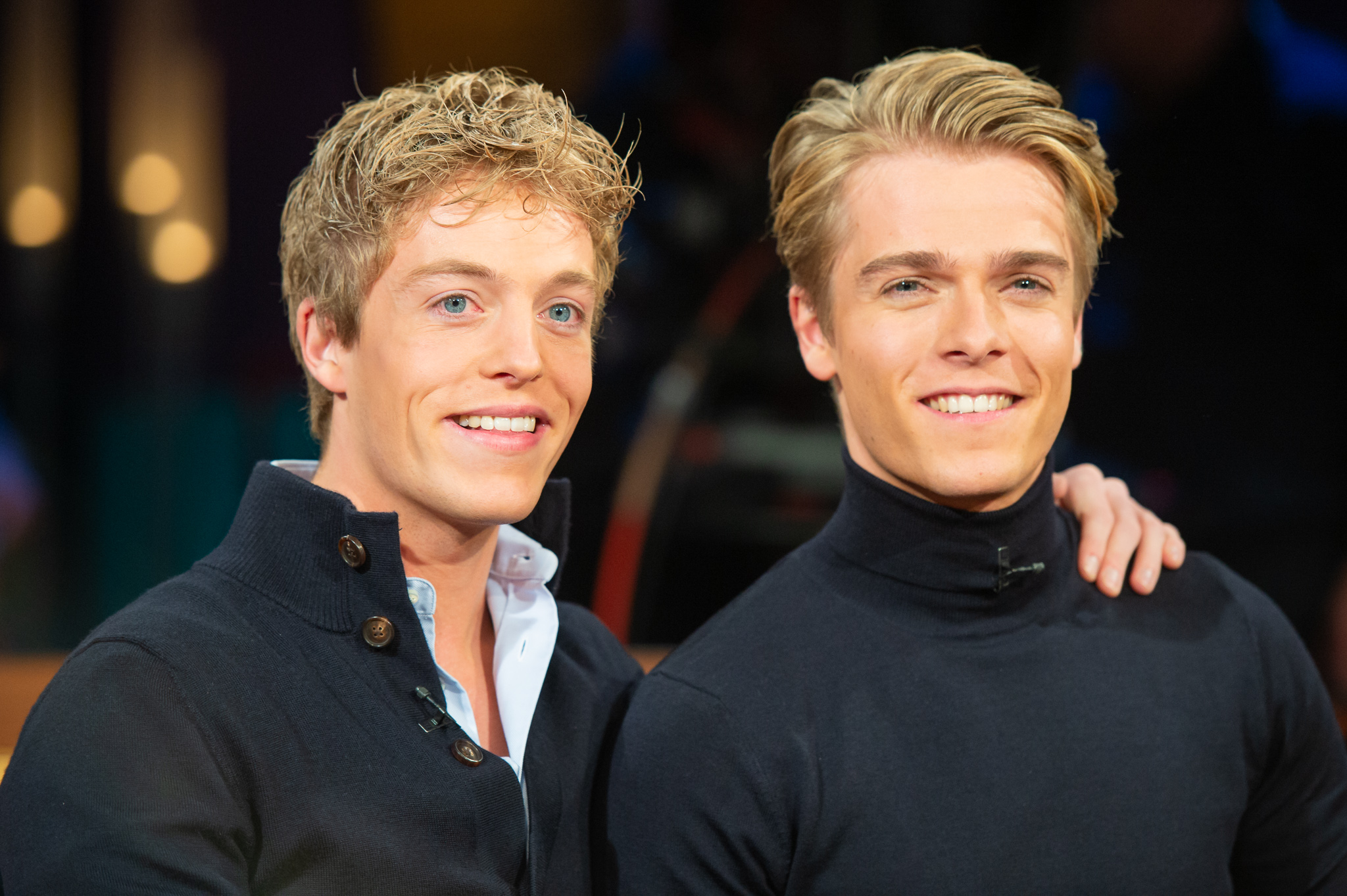
Lucas (left) and Arthur Jussen (right) in 2019

Lucas Jussen (born 27 February 1993) and Arthur Jussen (born 28 September 1996) are a Dutch piano duo. They are brothers who have been performing in public since early childhood, often together as a piano duo. They come from a musical family: their mother Christianne van Gelder teaches the flute, while their father Paul Jussen is a timpanist in the Dutch Radio Philharmonic Orchestra in Hilversum and a percussionist in the Ensemble Da Capo. The brothers were students of piano teacher Jan Wijn. They lived and studied with Maria João Pires and have played with pianists Ricardo Castro and Lang Lang.

On 24 November 2006, at the ages of 10 and 13, they played Mozart's Piano Concerto No. 10 at Concertgebouw (Amsterdam) with the Netherlands Radio Chamber Philharmonic under Jaap van Zweden. On 30 November 2009, they performed the Concerto for Two Pianos (Poulenc) with the same orchestra under Michael Schønwandt. The Jussen brothers signed a recording contract with the Deutsche Grammophon Gesellschaft on 12 March 2010 and have recorded the Mozart and Poulenc concertos, as well as other duo and solo works. After two years of studying with Menahem Pressler in the United States since October 2013, Lucas continued his education with Dmitri Bashkirov at the Reina Sofía School of Music in Madrid. He is also Artist in Residence of the Dutch Chamber Orchestra. Arthur studied at Conservatory of Amsterdam under Jan Wijn.
