= Ton Hartsuiker =

Dutch musician

Antoni Fredrik "Ton" Hartsuiker (12 May 1933 in Zwolle – 8 May 2015 in Utrecht) was a Dutch classical pianist, best known as a performer of 20th-century classical music, composer, music school administrator, and radio broadcaster.

He was the director of both the Music Academy of Utrecht and the Conservatorium van Amsterdam, and was also on the faculty of the Rotterdam Conservatoire and Enschede Music Academy. For 22 years he presented the program Musica Nova on Radio 4, the Dutch classical radio station, for broadcasting organization NOS. He was the musical director of and a pianist in Ensemble M (1974–1978), founded by Hartsuiker and the conductor David Porcelijn.

He won the Geneco Prize in 1998. For his contributions to music in the Netherlands he was knighted by Queen Beatrix of the Netherlands (1998) and in 2002 received the Hogenbijl Prize.

Among his many students, at several music academies and as a private teacher, were Alwin Bär, Guus Janssen, Arthur Jussen, Vera Kerstens, Christiaan Kuyvenhoven, Ralph van Raat, Christiaan Richter, Joey Roukens, Maarten van Veen, and Ljuba Moiz.
