= Ilya Klyachko =

Ilya Klyachko (Russian Илья Романович Клячко, Ilijia Romanovič Kljačko) (1905–1998) was a pianist and piano teacher, professor of Moscow Conservatory. Among his students were: Mikhail Voskresensky, Elena Sorokina, Alexander Bakhchiev, Alexey Parshin, Galina Turkina, Julia Turkina and many others.
