= Nino Gvetadze =

Georgian classical concert pianist

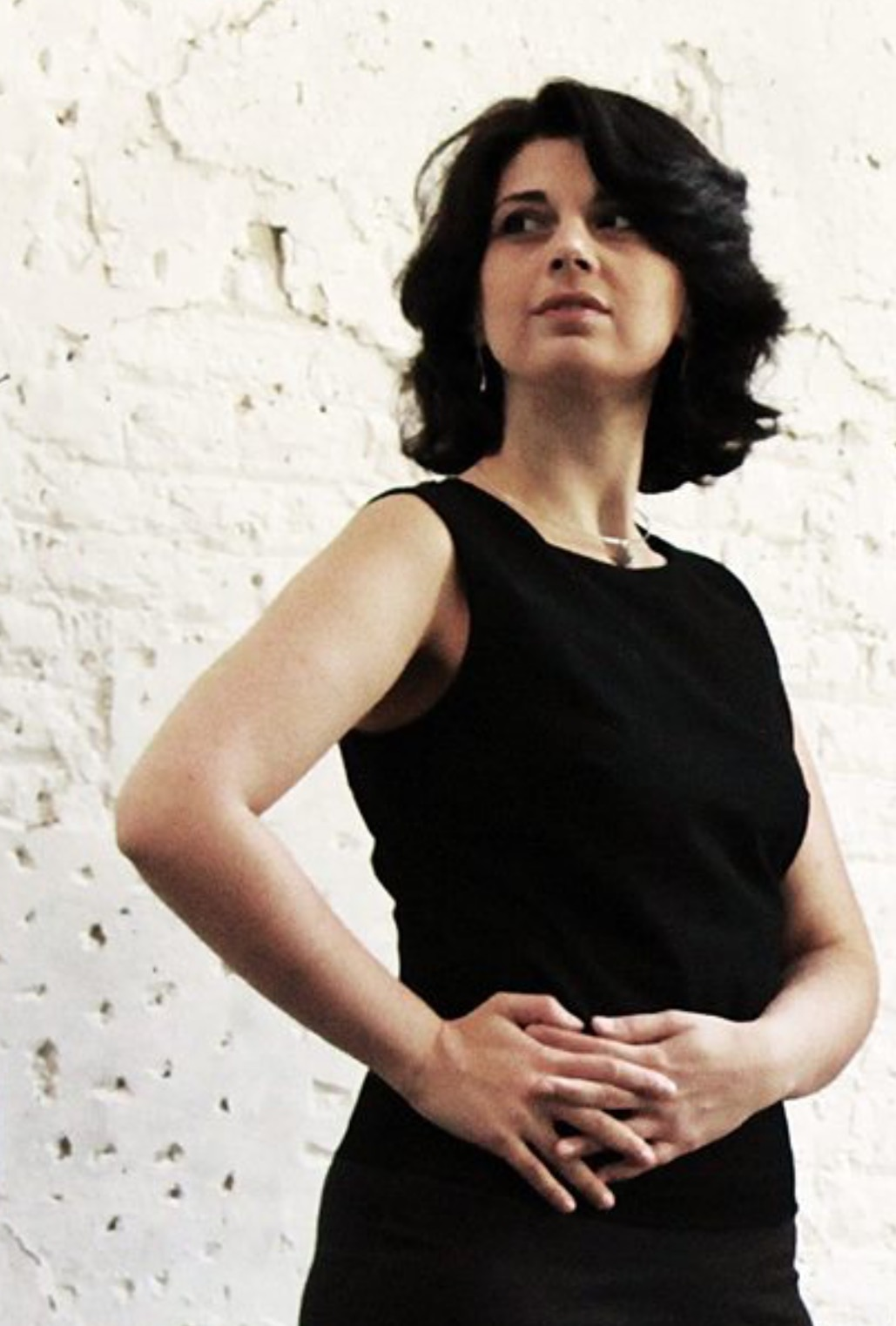
- Gvetadze in 2016

Background information
- Genres: Classical
- Occupation: Pianist
- Instrument: Piano
- Website: ninogvetadze.net

Nino Gvetadze is a Georgian classical concert pianist.

== Early life ==
Born and raised in Tbilisi, Georgia, Gvetadze studied in Tbilisi State Conservatoire and later in The Hague and Conservatorium van Amsterdam. Her teachers were Veronika Tumanishvili, Nodar Gabunia, Nana Khubutia, Paul Komen and Jan Wijn.

== Competitions ==
Gvetadze won Second Prize, Press Prize and Audience Prize at the International Franz Liszt Piano Competition in 2008. In 2010 she was awarded the Borletti-Buitoni Trust Award.

== Performances ==
Gvetadze plays in concert halls as Concertgebouw Amsterdam, Centre for Fine Arts, Brussels, Konzerthaus Berlin, Wigmore Hall London, Tonhalle, Zürich and many others. Gvetadze appears as a soloist with Residentie Orchestra, Rotterdam Philharmonic Orchestra, Brussels Philharmonic, Netherlands Philharmonic Orchestra, Amsterdam Sinfonietta, Mahler Chamber Orchestra, Seoul Philharmonic Orchestra, Münchner Philharmoniker.

Gvetadze is an artistic leader of Delft Chamber Music Festival and Naarden International Piano Festival and participates in International Festivals, among those Kuhmo Chamber Music Festival, Festival dei Due Mondi, Tsinandali Festival.

== Recordings ==
Gvetadze has recorded nine solo CDs featuring the works of Ludwig van Beethoven, Frederic Chopin, Franz Liszt, Cyril Scott, Claude Debussy, Modest Mussorgsky, Nodar Gabunia, Giya Kancheli and Sergei Rachmaninoff on record labels Orchid Classics, Brilliant Classics, Challenge Records, and Etcetera Records.
