= Igor Roma =

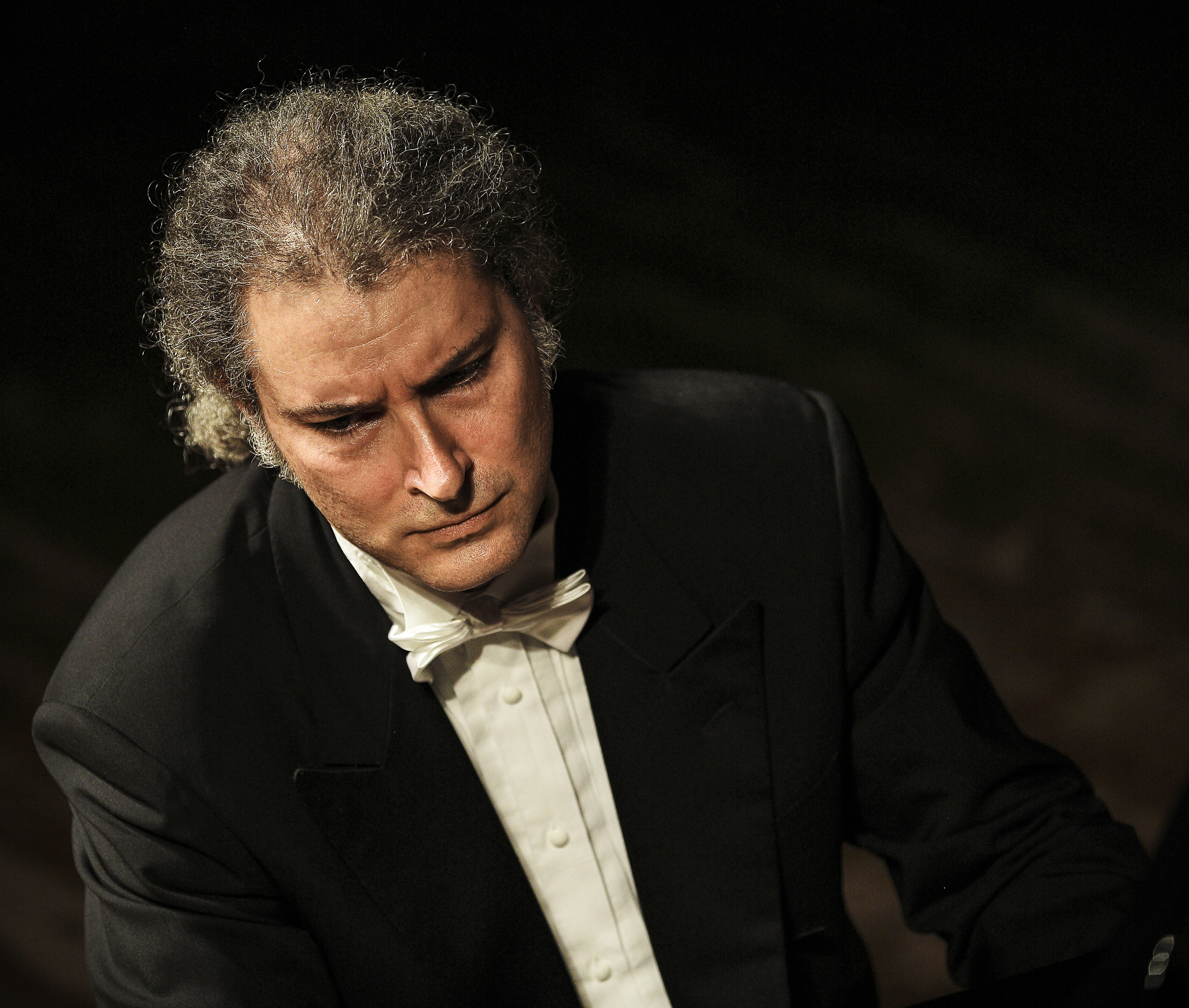

Background information
- Born: 31 March 1969 (age 56); Baden, Switzerland
- Genres: classical music
- Occupation: pianist
- Instrument: Piano
- Website: igorroma.com

Igor Roma is an Italian virtuoso pianist.

== Biography ==
Igor Roma was born in Baden, in the German-speaking part of Switzerland, where he started studying the piano at the age of eleven. In 1984, he moved to Italy and started attending piano classes at the Conservatoire in Vicenza with Carlo Mazzoli until 1991, when he received his diploma with honors. At the end of the Eighties, Roma won various Italian piano competitions and was admitted to the prestigious International Piano Academy “Incontri col Maestro” in Imola, where he studied with Franco Scala, Lazar Berman, Boris Petrushansky and Alexander Lonquich. In 1997, he finished his studies at the Piano Academy in Imola receiving his diploma with the title of “Master”.

Igor Roma’s concerts take place mainly in the Netherlands. He has also played in Italy, other European Countries, the United States, South Africa and China. He has performed with the conductors Stanislaw Skrowacewsky, Reinbert de Leeuw, Roberto Benzi, Ton Koopman, Philippe Herreweghe, Claus Peter Flor, Jaap van Zweden, Josep Pons, Zoltán Kocsis, playing with the Rotterdam Philharmonic Orchestra, the Netherlands Philharmonic Orchestra, the Netherlands Radio Symphony, the Amsterdam Sinfonietta, the Arnhem Philharmonic Orchestra, the Franz Liszt Chamber Orchestra, the Bilbao Orkestra Sinfonikoa, the National Orchestra of Spain, the Stavanger Symphony Orchestra, the National Symphony Orchestra of Ireland, the Hungarian National Philharmonic, the Orchestra Sinfonica di Milano Giuseppe Verdi, the New World Symphony (orchestra) of Miami Beach and the Hong Kong Philharmonic Orchestra. His repertoire ranges from Bach to Messiaen and includes lesser-known piano pieces by composers such as De Falla, Szymanowski, Kurtag and Charles-Valentin Alkan, of whom he recorded his Etude Op. 39 No. 12 Aesop's Feast – one of the most technically demanding piano pieces ever written.

Roma often performs in chamber music settings with other musicians and in chamber music groups. He has recorded for Challenge Records and is often invited to sit on the juries of national and international music competitions, like in the 8th “Franz Liszt” Piano Competition in Utrecht in 2008 and in the subsequent editions of its “International Selection Rounds”.

Igor Roma teaches at the International Piano Academy “Incontri col Maestro” in Imola, at the “Conservatorium Zuyd” in Maastricht, and at the Conservatorium “A. Buzzolla” in Adria. He has also been a regular guest at the “Peter the Great Festival” of Groningen and of the “Imola Piano Academy” of Eindhoven.

== Prizes and awards ==
In 1994, he won sixth prize at the International Piano Competition in Dublin and fifth prize at the Hamamatsu International Piano Competition. In 1995, he came fifth in the Arthur Rubinstein International Piano Master Competition in Tel Aviv. In 1996 he won first prize at the International Franz Liszt Piano Competition in Utrecht. The jury decided not to assign the second prize and to assign a shared third prize to the other two finalists. He was also rewarded with the press prize.
