= Wibi Soerjadi =

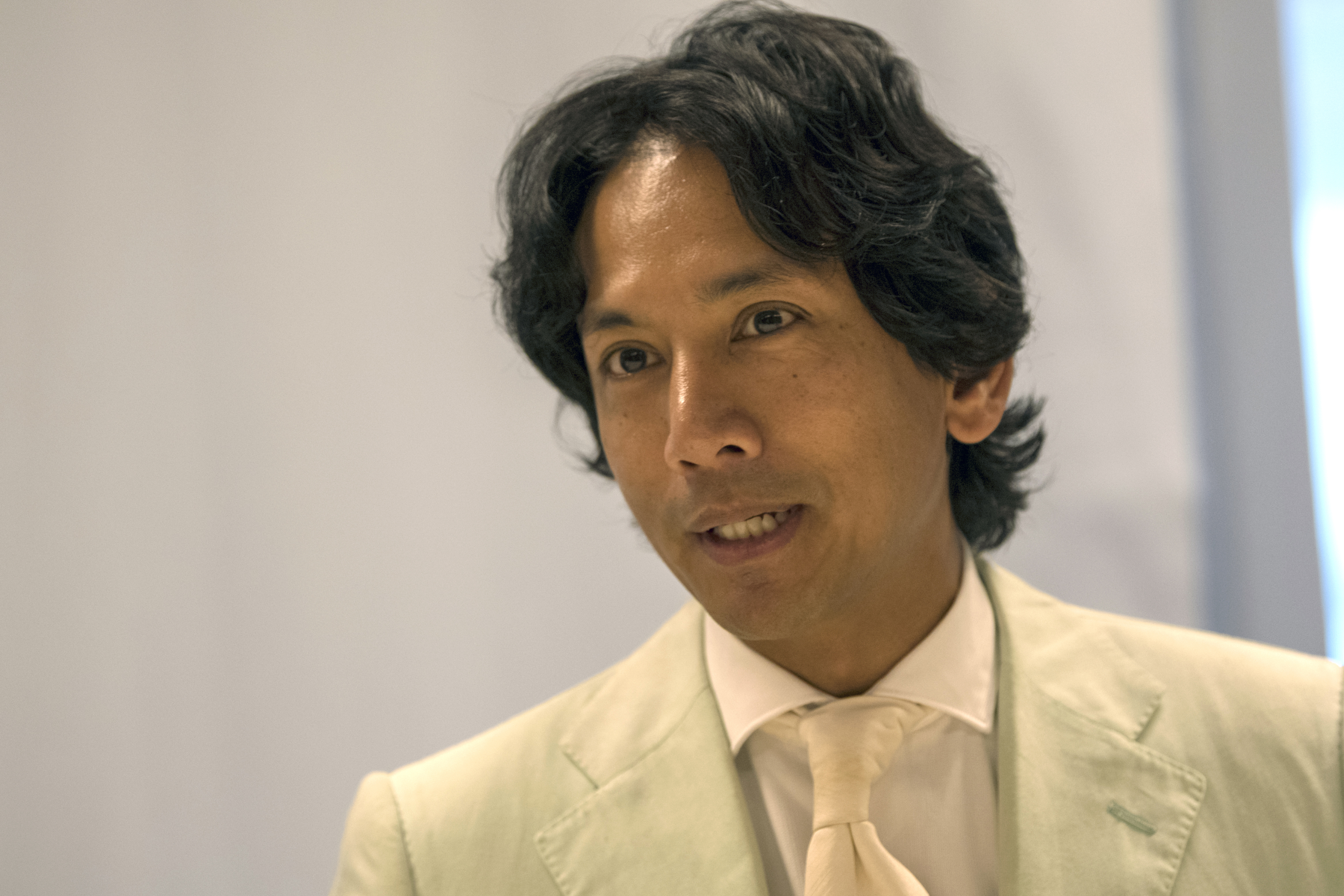

Background information
- Born: 2 March 1970 (age 56); Leiden, Netherlands
- Genres: Classical
- Occupations: Performer, composer
- Instrument: Piano
- Years active: 1985–present

Wibi Soerjadi (born 2 March 1970) is a Dutch concert pianist and composer.

== Biography ==
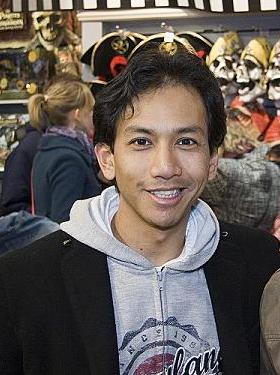
Soerjadi in March 2007

Wibi Soerjadi was born 2 March 1970, in Leiden, Netherlands in a Dutch Indonesian family. He began studying piano at age eleven with Bob Brouwer and later at the Sweelinck Conservatorium with Jan Wijn where he graduated early with the highest result ever, a ten with distinction.

Soerjadi has received top prizes at many competitions including 1st prize at the National Princess Christina Concours (1985), 1st prize at the National Eurovision Competition for Young Musicians (1988), and third prize in the International Franz Liszt Piano Competition (1989) in Utrecht. Other prizes include the Elizabeth Evert Prize for Exceptionally Talented Musicians (1990), Echo Klassik Award of the Deutsche Phono Academy (1998), the Edison Classical Music Audience Prize (1999), and the Classic FM Award (2010). In 2007, Soerjadi was given royal recognition as a Knight of the Order of Orange Nassau.

In 2006, Dr. Ben Daeter wrote a book on Wibi Soerjadi entitled "Wibi Soerjadi: The Man, The Artist" and in 2011, Wibi Soerjadi premiered his own TV show "Under Wibi's Wings".

Soerjadi has given numerous concerts across the Netherlands (Amsterdam Concertgebouw), Austria (Musikverein), Germany (Hamburg Musikhalle and Philharmonie in Berlin), Italy (Valencia, Verona), China (Beijing, GuangZhou), United States (Carnegie Hall), Indonesia, Slovakia, and England.

Soerjadi has appeared as a soloist with many lead orchestras including the Residentie Orchestra, Rotterdam Philharmonic Orchestra, Radio Filharmonisch Orkest, Orquesta de Valencia, Orquesta Sinfonica Ciudad de Oviedo, Tchaikovsky Symphony Orchestra Moscow, Leipzig Gewandhaus Orchestra, and the London Philharmonic Orchestra with many prestigious conductors including Evgeny Svetlanov, Vassili Sinaisky and Sergiu Comissiona.

Soerjadi's own compositions have received much acclaim including "The Spirit of Sunrise", which was written for Dutch dressage rider Imke Schellekens-Bartels and performed at the 2007 World Cup Qualification in Amsterdam where Schellekens-Bartels won gold, "The Dance of Devotion", which was performed by Dutch dressage rider Anky van Grunsven during her gold medal performance at the 2008 World Cup, and "Bellezza", which was written for Dutch figure skater Karen Venhuizen and was performed at the 2008 Aegon Challenge Cup by Akiko Suzuki.

Soerjadi also does much work for the promotion of classical music for young people, and in 2005 he performed with Dutch rock band Di-rect on their top 10 single "Blind for You". In addition, Soerjadi also gives regular masterclasses for select young talents.

Soerjadi currently lives in Zeist, Netherlands where he often opens up his home for private concerts at the Wulperhorst Salon.

== Health problems ==
In early 2009, Soerjadi suffered from acute sensorineural hearing loss and was unable to give concerts. However, in May 2009, he made his comeback recital in the Amsterdam Concertgebouw.

In 2011, Soerjadi suffered from complications of a hernia and had to cancel concert tours in Italy and Indonesia, postponing them until September 2011.

== Discography ==
- 1989 Live at Vredenburg (Erasmus)
- 1996 A Touch of Romance (Philips)
- 1997 Live at Carnegie Hall
- 1997 Liszt for Lovers: Piano Dreams of Love and Passion (Philips)
- 1998 Plays Chopin (Philips)
- 2000 Rachmaninov Pianoconcerts Nrs. 2 & 3 (Philips)
- 2003 Pieces of a Dream (Soerjadi Records)
- 2004 Encore (Soerjadi Records)
- 2006 All-Time Classics (Soerjadi Records)
- 2008 Dance of Devotion (Soerjadi Records)
- 2008 Mother Melodies (Soerjadi Records)
- 2009 Hand to Heart (Soerjadi Records)
- 2011 Wibi (Soerjadi Records)

All of Soerjadi's recordings have attained either gold or platinum status — a rare feat in classical music.

== Notable appearances ==
- 22 November 1996: Debut recital at Carnegie Hall in New York City;
- 24 September 2005: Concert at Disneyland Resort Paris to commemorate the golden jubilee of Disneyland.
- 2006 Concert on historic Liszt Grand Piano 576 from 1862 in the Concertgebouw in Amsterdam
- 27 May 2007: Performance in Slovakia as a cultural gift of Queen Beatrix at the Conservatorium in Košice
- 29 May 2009: Comeback recital at the Amsterdam Concertgebouw
- 27 January 2011: Concert at Carnegie Hall in New York
