= Elena Sorokina =

Writer, curator and art historian

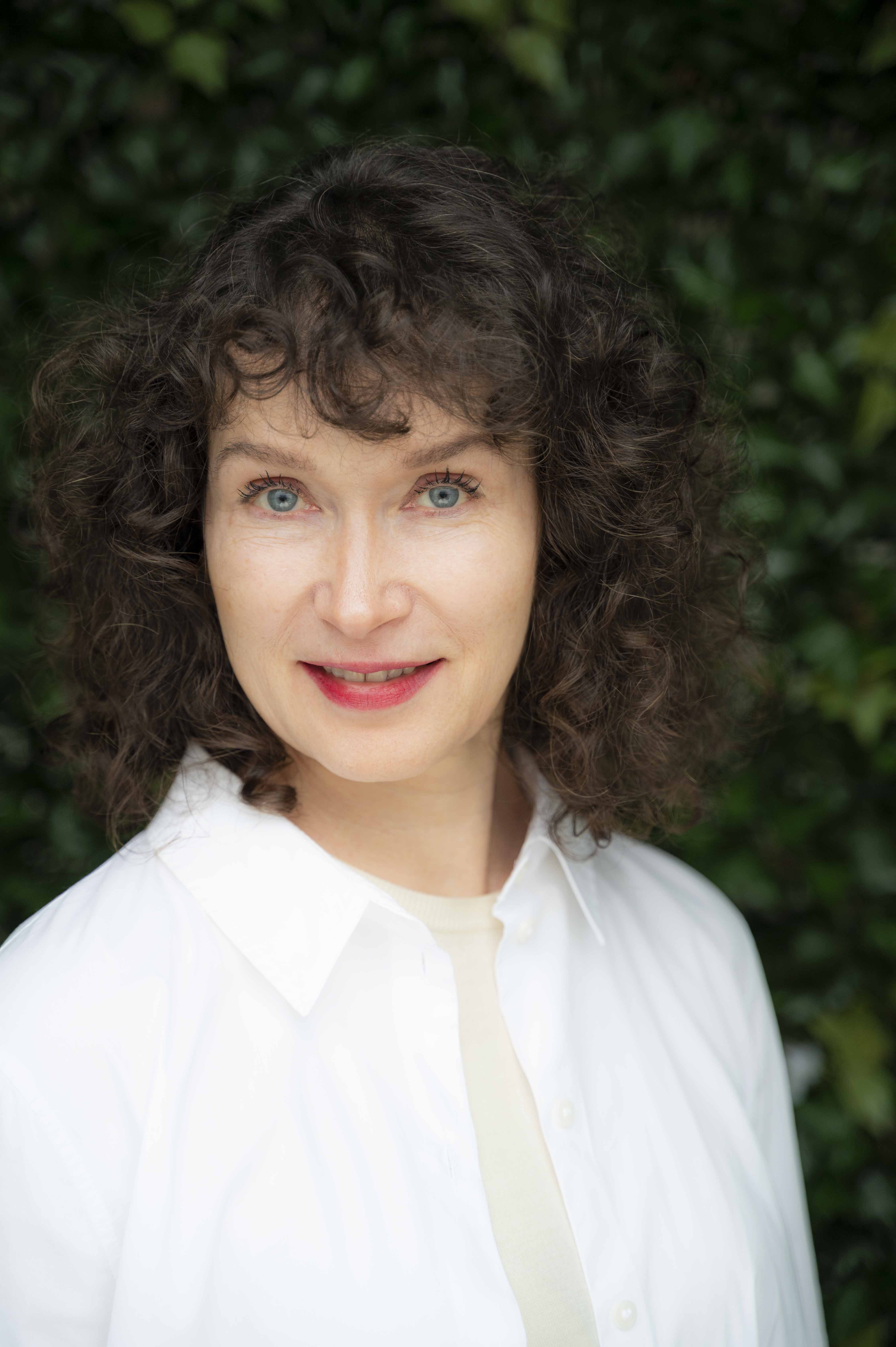
Elena Sorokina, 2023. © Lucie Čermáková

Elena Sorokina is a curator, art historian and writer based in Paris and Brussels. She was part of the curatorial team for documenta 14 (2017) and co-curator of the Armenian Pavilion at the 59th Venice Biennale (2022). She served as chief curator of the HISK Higher Institute of Fine Arts, Belgium in 2017–2019. As independent curator, Sorokina has organised projects at BOZAR Centre for Fine Arts, Art Brussels, and WIELS, Brussels; Centre Pompidou and Musée d'Art Moderne de la Ville de Paris; SMBA Stedelijk Museum, Amsterdam; Galerie Rudolfinum, Prague; and Pera Museum, Istanbul, among others.

== Education ==
Sorokina studied art history at the Freie Universität in Berlin and the Rheinische Friedrich-Wilhelms-Universität in Bonn, where she completed her masters. In 2004-2005, she attended the curatorial studies of the Whitney Museum Independent Study Program (ISP), which culminated with the final exhibition "At the Mercy of Others: The Politics of Care". She was in the first selection of the Young Curators Residency Programme at the Fondazione Sandretto Re Rebaudengo, Turin, in 2007.

== Career ==
Sorokina started her career in the United States, curating exhibitions at White Columns, Art in General and YBCA San Francisco.

She served as curatorial advisor for documenta 14 in Kassel, Germany and Athens, Greece. In this framework, she co-curated with Bonaventure Soh Bejeng Ndikung the "Symphony of Resonances", the only project of documenta 14 in Thessaloniki, Greece. It featured the work of O+A (Bruce Odland/Sam Auinger) and took place at the Rotunda of Galerius (early 4th century AD) and Navarino Square.

In 2017, Sorokina was appointed the chief curator of HISK (Higher Institute for Fine Arts) in Belgium. During her mandate she organised several collaborations between HISK and other institutions such as Art Brussels (with a special project Mystic Properties, for the 50th Anniversary edition of Art Brussels), and The Swamp School of the Lithuanian Pavilion at the Venice International Architecture Biennale.

In 2020, she co-founded an independent project, Initiatives for Practices and Visions of Radical Care, with Natasa Petresin-Bachelez, Head of Artistic and Cultural Programme at Cité internationale des arts in Paris. In 2022, Sorokina co-curated the Armenian Pavilion (with Anne Davidian), featuring the solo exhibition of Andrius Arutiunian, an Armenian-Lithuanian artist working with sound.

=== Sustainable Curating ===
In 2020, Sorokina curated the exhibition "Crystal Clear: Travels in Sustainable Exhibition Making" at Pera Museum, Istanbul, which responded to the COVID-19 pandemic with principles of sustainability. The project was developed as a contained ecosystem of relations and a small circular economy with diverse entanglements of production, display, and recycling of artistic, curatorial, and institutional work, material and immaterial. It implemented the following sustainability principles: production of the work in collaboration with small local associations, radically reduced shipment of objects, no crating, the use of recuperated materials, and creative recycling of the exhibition after its closure.

== Exhibitions and Projects ==
- Gharib, Armenian Pavilion, 59th Venice Biennale, co-curated with Anne Davidian, 2022
- En solidarité avec L’Ukraine. Une Assemblée exceptionnelle. With the Initiative for Practices and Visions of Radical Care, Centre Pompidou, Paris, 2022
- Fragilités, Galerie Rudolfinum Prague, Czech Republic, co-curated with Silvia Van Espen, 2022
- Crystal Clear: Travels in Sustainable Exhibition Making, Pera Museum, Istanbul, 2021
- Zhanna Kadyrova. Resistance of Matter, Galleria Continua, Paris, 2019
- Variations on Vulnerability, Slow Compositions Between Six and Midnight, BOZAR, Brussels, co-organised with Aria Spinelli, 2018
- Mystic Properties, Hotel de La Poste, Tour et Taxis, Brussels, 2018
- Psycho-Vertical: Štefan Papčo, KunstHalle Bratislava, Slovakia, 2017
- The Grid and the Cloud: How to Connect, Higher Institute for Fine Arts, Gent, Belgium, 2017
- Museum (Science)Fictions, Centre Pompidou, Paris, 2016
- Forms of Togetherness (and Separation), a Narrated Exhibition, WIELS, Brussels, 2015
- Lene Berg. Portrait of a Woman with Moustache, in “Revoir Picasso”, Musée Picasso Paris, 2015
- Spaces of Exception, Special project for the Moscow Biennial, co-curated with Jelle Bouwhuis, 2013
- NEWTOPIA. The state of human rights, curatorial advisor to Katerina Gregos, Mechelen, Belgium, 2012
- What Is a Postcolonial Exhibition?, Stedelijk Museum Amsterdam and SMBA, Amsterdam, 2012
- Etats de l'Artifice, Musee d'Art Moderne de la Ville de Paris, 2010
- Scènes Centrales, part of Frontières Invisibles, TriPostal, Lille, France, 2009
- On Traders’ Dilemmas: Tracing Roads Through Central Asia, YBCA (Yerba Buena Center for the Arts), San Francisco, 2008
- Laws of Relativity (La legge e relativa per tutti), Sandretto Re Rebaudengo Foundation, co-curated with Anna Colin, Turin, 2008
- At the Mercy of Others. The Politics of Care, Whitney Museum of American Art ISP, New York, 2004
- Crude Oil Paintings, White Columns, New York, 2004

== Writing ==
Between 2000-2007, Sorokina had been writing art criticism in German for several publications including Die Tageszeitung, Frankfurter Rundschau, Wirtschaftswoche, Die Welt, Die Zeit, and later in English for e-flux, Artforum, Manifesta Journal.

- 'On Rocket Flowers and the Speed of Snails', in fragilités, exhibition catalogue. Czech Republic: Rudolfinum, 2022.
- Crystal Clear, exhibition catalogue (co-editor). Istanbul: Pera Museum, 2020.
- Štefan Papčo: Verticality as Fantastic Occupation, artist monograph (editor). 2019
- Mystic Properties, limited edition with Kristien Daems. Brussels: HISK; ART Brussels, 2018.
- The Grid and the Cloud. How to Connect, exhibition catalogue (editor). Brussels: HISK, 2017.
- Manolo Millares, exhibition catalogue (editor). Galerie Mayoral, 2017.
- Newtopia: The State of Human Rights, exhibition catalogue (co-editor). Ludion, 2013.
- 'Performing the Documentary', in Mutations: Perspectives on Photography, 1st ed. Steidl, 2011.
- 'Pacific Perspectives', in Paradigm Shifts: Walter and McBean Galleries Exhibitions and Public Programs San Francisco Art Institute 2006-2011. San Francisco: SFAI, 2011.
- 'Starring Abramovic, Playing Herself', Manifesta Journal, N11, 2010.
- Frontières Invisibles, exhibition catalogue (co-editor). Broché, 2009.
- 'Performance Practice of Elena Kovylina', in 15th Biennale of Sydney: Zones of Contact. Sydney: Biennale of Sydney, 2006.
- 'Terrain Vague as a Stage: Chinese Video at PS1 in New York', Performance Art Journal, MIT Press, 2004-2005.
- Crude Oil Paintings, exhibition catalogue. New York: White Columns, 2004.
