= Jan Wijn =

Dutch pianist and pedagogue (1934–2022)

- Born: 19 May 1934; Amsterdam, Netherlands
- Died: 12 July 2022 (aged 88) Amersfoort, Netherlands
- Genres: Contemporary classical music
- Occupations: Composer, pianist

Jan Wijn (19 May 1934 – 12 July 2022) was a Dutch pianist and pedagogue.

Wijn studied at the Amsterdam Conservatory under Cornelius Berkhout, where he received his diploma in 1955. He then studied under Béla Síki in Switzerland and Alicia de Larrocha in Spain. In 1960, Jan Wijn won first place in the "concours van Ourense" (international piano competition in Ourense (Spain)). Up to 1975 Jan Wijn had an international as well as national career. Problems with his right hand caused him to retire from 1976 to 1997, although he continued to play with only his left hand and eventually regained full mobility.

His students included Ronald Brautigam, Wibi Soerjadi, Hans Eijsackers, Paolo Giacometti, Frank Peters, Folke Nauta, Miguel Ituarte, Lucas & Arthur Jussen, and Nino Gvetadze.
