= Symphony No. 3 (Rachmaninoff) =

1936 musical work by Sergei Rachmaninoff

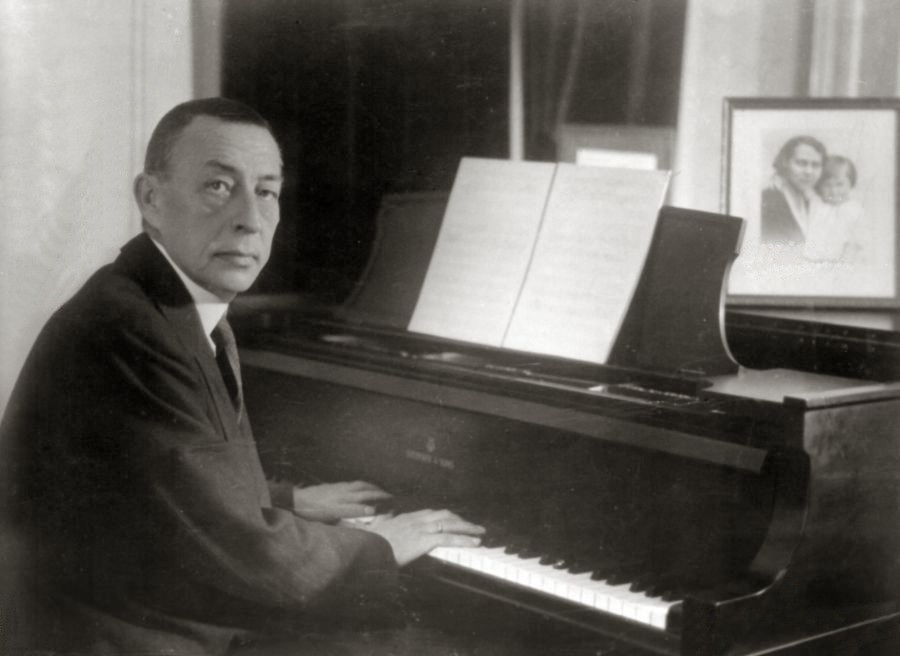
Sergei Rachmaninoff playing his Steinway grand piano at his home (1936 or before)

Symphony No. 3 in A minor, Op. 44, is a three-movement composition for orchestra written from 1935 to 1936 by the Russian composer Sergei Rachmaninoff. The Third Symphony is considered a transitional work in Rachmaninoff's output. In melodic outline and rhythm it is his most expressively Russian symphony, particularly in the dance rhythms of the finale. What was groundbreaking in this symphony was its greater economy of utterance compared to its two predecessors. This sparer style, first apparent in the Rhapsody on a Theme of Paganini, enhances the emotional power of the work.

The symphony was premiered on November 6, 1936, with Leopold Stokowski conducting the Philadelphia Orchestra. Critical opinion was divided and public opinion negative toward the work. Rachmaninoff remained convinced of the piece's worth, however, and conducted the Philadelphia Orchestra in the first recording of the work in 1939. Following the reevaluation of Rachmaninoff's work in the 1970s, the symphony has been viewed in a more favorable light and has been frequently played and recorded.

== Form ==
The symphony contains only three movements, but its central one fulfills the dual role of slow movement and scherzo — a structural innovation with marked similarities to the third symphony of Antonín Dvořák. The work employs cyclic form, with the subtle use of a motto theme combined, as usual with Rachmaninoff's works, with references to the plain-chant Dies irae. Also like Rachmaninoff's motto themes — and thus differing from Tchaikovsky's — it is short and, by tending to assume various shapes, is easily workable for further symphonic development. The piece is approximately 40 minutes long.

1. Lento – Allegro moderato – Allegro (A minor)
2. Adagio ma non troppo – Allegro vivace (C♯ minor)
3. Allegro – Allegro vivace – Allegro (Tempo primo) – Allegretto – Allegro vivace (A major)

== Composition ==
Rachmaninoff composed his Third Symphony after writing his Rhapsody on a Theme of Paganini and Variations on a Theme of Corelli. He arrived at his newly built Villa Senar on Lake Lucerne in Switzerland in late April 1935 with the prospect of writing a symphony in mind. Satisfied with his new home and in good spirits, Rachmaninoff seemed definitely up to the task. On May 15 he informed his cousin Sofiya Satina that he had done "some work," and during the following weeks was seriously at work with the composition. However, a three-week cure at Baden-Baden in July, along with a two-week hiatus in August, put Rachmaninoff behind. Five days before leaving Senar at the end of his summer holiday, Rachmaninov wrote to Satina with some dissatisfaction, "I have finished two-thirds in clean form but the last third of the work in rough. If you take into account that the first two-thirds took seventy days of intense work, for the last third – thirty-five days – there is not enough time. Travels begin and I must get down to playing the piano. So it looks as though my work will be put aside until next year."

Near the end of the 1935–36 concert season, recitals in Switzerland enabled Rachmaninoff to pay a brief visit to Senar. He evidently took the score of the symphony with him when he left, since he had it with him in Paris in February 1936 for Julius Conus to mark bowings in the string parts. Work on the last movement had to wait until the composer arrived at Senar on April 16 for the summer holiday. On June 30, the composer reported to Satina, "Yesterday morning I finished my work, of which you are the first to be informed. It is a symphony. Its first performance is promised to Stokowski—probably in November. With all my thoughts I thank God that I was able to do it!" Rachmaninoff arrived in America just in time for final rehearsals of the work's premiere.

== Instrumentation ==
The symphony is scored for full orchestra with 3 flutes (the 3rd doubling piccolo), 3 oboes (the 3rd doubling cor anglais), 2 clarinets in A and B♭, bass clarinet in A and B♭, 2 bassoons, contrabassoon, 4 horns, 2 trumpets in A and B♭, 1 contralto trumpet in F, 3 trombones, tuba, percussion (timpani, cymbals, bass drum, snare drum, triangle, tambourine, tam-tam, and xylophone), 2 harps (or harp and small upright piano), celesta, and strings.

== Reactions ==
=== Critical ===
The day after the Third Symphony premiered, Edwin Schloss wrote for The Philadelphia Record that he found the work "a disappointment," with "echoes ... of the composer's lyric spaciousness of style" but largely sterile. Even Olin Downes, normally a champion of the composer's works, was not so sure about this piece:

The outward characteristics of Rachmaninoff's style are evident in the work heard on this occasion. It cannot be said, however, that in these pages Mr. Rachmaninoff says things which are new, even though his idiom is more his own than ever before, and free of the indebtedness it once had to Tchaikovsky. Nor is it easy to avoid the impression, at a first hearing of the work, of a certain diffuseness. There is a tendency to over-elaboration of detail, and to unnecessary extensions, so that the last movement, in particular, appears too long. Would not a pair of shears benefit the proportions of this work?

Samuel L. Laciar, reviewing the work for the Public Ledger, gave a more positive assessment. He called the symphony "a most excellent work in musical conception, composition and orchestration," adding that Rachmaninoff "has given us another example in this work that it is not necessary to write dissonant music in order to get the originality which is the greatest—and usually the single—demand of the ultra-moderns." W. J. Henderson of the Sun was perhaps most accurate in summing up both the work and the situation the critics faced in assessing it:

It is the creation of a genial mind laboring in a field well known and loved by it, but not seeking now to raise the fruit of heroic proportions.... The first movement is orthodox in its initial statement of two contrasting chief subjects. They are contrasted in the customary way, in temper and tonality. But the working out section pays only polite respect to tradition. The development of themes immediately follows their statement and this is Rachmaninoff's method. The cantabile theme of the first movement is especially attractive in its lyric and plaintive character and the leading subject has virility and possibilities which are not neglected later. In fact, we suspect, after this insufficient first hearing, that there is more organic unity in this symphony through consanguinity of themes than is instantly discernable.

=== Public ===
The public was as confused as the critics. Listeners who enjoyed the Second and Third Concertos, the Second Symphony, Isle of the Dead and, more recently, the Rhapsody on a Theme of Paganini, came expecting a quite different work than the one they heard. As Barrie Martyn phrases it, "The public had doubtless been misled by the old-style romanticism of the eighteenth Paganini variation and were perplexed to find that Rachmaninoff had after all advanced beyond the 1900s; the critics, on the other hand, condemned him just because they felt that he had not."

=== Composer ===
Rachmaninoff believed the Third Symphony was one of his best works, and its lukewarm reception disappointed and puzzled him. He summed up the situation in a 1937 letter to Vladimir Wilshaw: "It was played in New York, Philadelphia, Chicago, etc. At the first two performances I was present. It was played wonderfully. Its reception by both the public and critics was sour. One review sticks painfully in my mind: that I didn't have a Third Symphony in me any more. Personally, I am firmly convinced that this is a good work. But—sometimes composers are mistaken too! Be that as it may, I am holding to my opinion so far."

== Notable recordings ==
- Sergei Rachmaninoff conducting the Philadelphia Orchestra, recorded in 1939.
- Eugene Ormandy conducting the Philadelphia Orchestra, recorded in 1967.
- Paul Kletzki conducting the Orchestre de la Suisse Romande, recorded in 1968.
- André Previn conducting the London Symphony Orchestra, recorded in 1968.
- Yevgeny Svetlanov conducting the USSR State Symphony Orchestra, recorded in 1968.
- Leopold Stokowski conducting the National Philharmonic Orchestra, recorded in 1975.
- Edo de Waart conducting the Rotterdam Philharmonic Orchestra, recorded in 1977.
- Vladimir Ashkenazy conducting the Royal Concertgebouw Orchestra, recorded November 1980.
- Mariss Jansons conducting the St. Petersburg Philharmonic Orchestra, recorded 1992.
- David Zinman conducting the Baltimore Symphony Orchestra, recorded May 1994.
- Mikhail Pletnev conducting the Russian National Orchestra, recorded June 1997.
- Vasily Petrenko conducting the Royal Liverpool Philharmonic Orchestra, recorded July 2010.
- Yannick Nézet-Séguin conducting the Philadelphia Orchestra, recorded January 2020.
- John Wilson conducting the Sinfonia of London, recorded October 2022.

== Bibliography ==
- Bertensson, Sergei and Jay Leyda, with the assistance of Sophia Satina, Sergei Rachmaninoff—A Lifetime in Music (Washington Square, New York: New York University Press, 1956)). ISBN n/a.
- Harrison, Max, Rachmaninoff: Life, Works, Recordings (London and New York: Continuum, 2005). ISBN 0-8264-5344-9.
- Mann, William. CD pamphlet: "Rachmaninoff: Symphony No. 3, The Rock – Stockholm Philharmonic Orchestra / Paavo Berglund". RCA Victor. Recorded June 20–22, 1988, in Philharmonic Hall, Stockholm.
- Martyn, Barrie, Rachmaninoff: Composer, Pianist, Conductor (Aldershot, England: Scolar Press, 1990). ISBN 0-85967-809-1.
- Matthew-Walker, Robert, Rachmaninoff (London and New York: Omnibus Press, 1980). ISBN 0-89524-208-7.
- Norris, Gregory, Rachmaninoff (New York: Schirmer Books, 1993). ISBN 0-02-870685-4.
