= Sergei Rachmaninoff =

Russian composer and pianist (1873–1943)

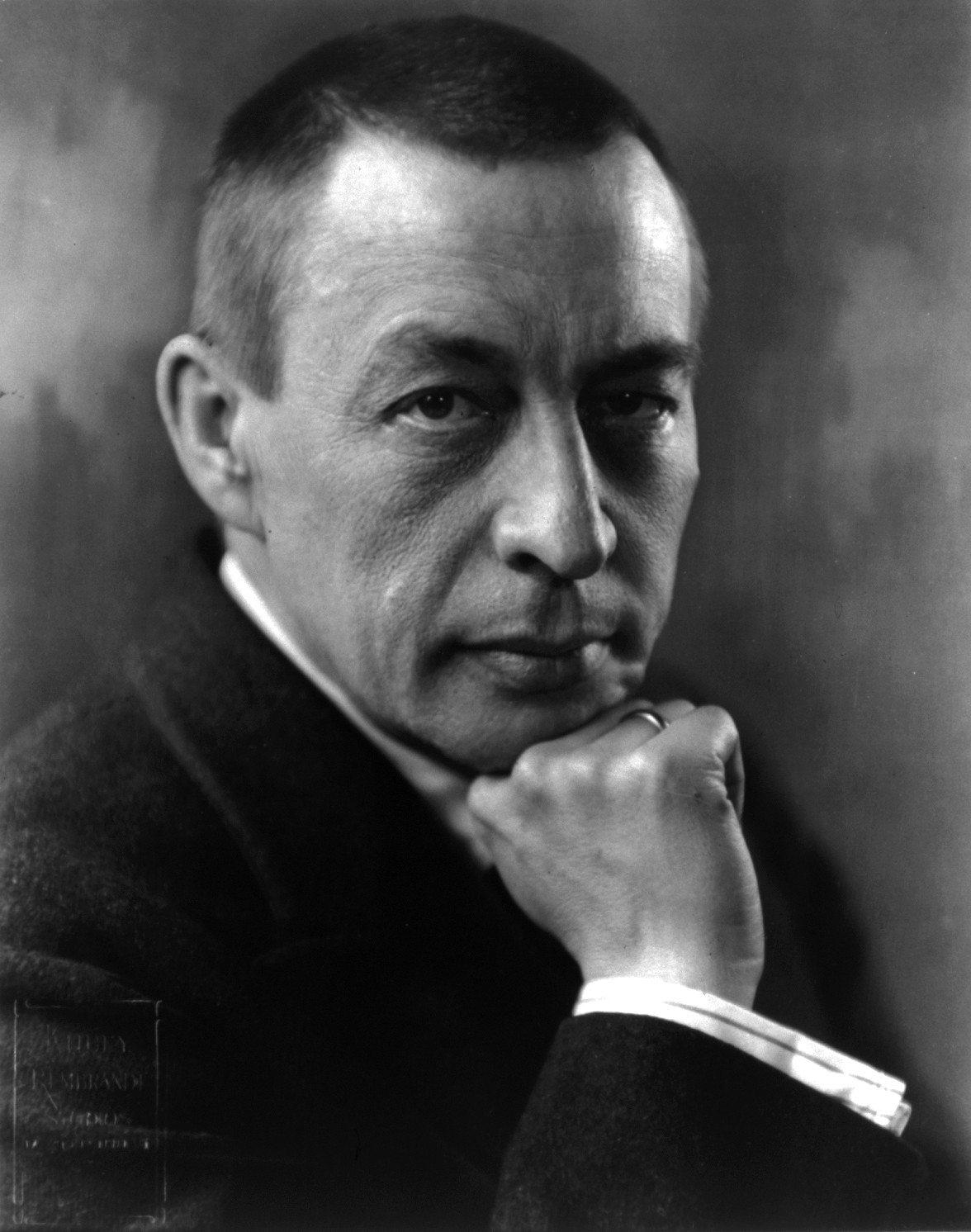
- Rachmaninoff in 1921
- Born: 1 April 1873; Semyonovo, Russia
- Died: 28 March 1943 (aged 69); Beverly Hills, California, U.S.
- Works: List of compositions

Signature
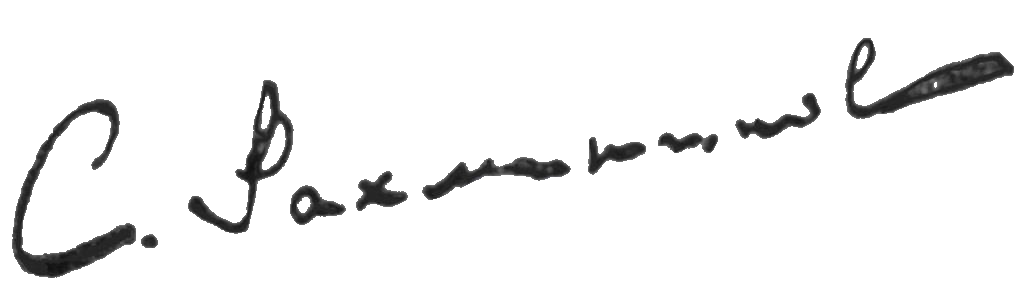

Sergei Vasilyevich Rachmaninoff (Note: In this name that follows East Slavic naming customs, the patronymic is Vasilievich and the family name is Rachmaninoff. Sergei Rachmaninoff was the spelling he used while living in the United States from 1918 until his death. The Library of Congress standardised this usage. His name is also commonly spelled Rachmaninov or Rakhmaninov.) (Note: UK: /ræxˈmænɪnɒf/ rakh-MAN-in-off, US: /rɑːxˈmɑːnɪnɔːf, -nɒf/ rahkh-MAH-nin-awf, -off; Russian: Сергей Васильевич Рахманинов, romanized: Sergey Vasilyevich Rakhmaninov, IPA: [sʲɪrˈɡʲej vɐˈsʲilʲjɪvʲɪtɕ rɐxˈmanʲɪnəf]; Сергѣй Васильевичъ Рахманиновъ in Russian pre-revolutionary script.) (1 April [O.S. 20 March] 1873 – 28 March 1943) was a Russian composer, virtuoso pianist, and conductor. Rachmaninoff is widely considered one of the finest pianists of his day and, as a composer, one of the last great representatives of Romanticism in Russian classical music. Early influences of Tchaikovsky, Rimsky-Korsakov, and other Russian composers gave way to a thoroughly personal idiom notable for its song-like melodicism, expressiveness, dense contrapuntal textures, and rich orchestral colours. He frequently utilizes the piano in his compositions, and he used his skills as a performer to fully explore the expressive and technical possibilities of the instrument.

Born into a musical family, Rachmaninoff began learning the piano at the age of four. He studied piano and composition at the Moscow Conservatory, from which he graduated in 1892, having already written several compositions. In 1897, following the disastrous premiere of his Symphony No. 1, Rachmaninoff entered a four-year depression and composed little, until supportive therapy allowed him to complete his very well-received Piano Concerto No. 2 in 1901. Rachmaninoff went on to conduct the Bolshoi Theatre from 1904 to 1906, and relocated to Dresden, Germany, in 1906. He later embarked upon his first tour of the United States as a concert pianist in 1909.

After the Russian Revolution, Rachmaninoff and his family left Russia permanently, settling in New York in 1918. Following this, he spent most of his time touring as a pianist in the US and Europe, from 1932 onwards spending his summers at his villa in Switzerland. During this time, Rachmaninoff's primary occupation was performing, and his compositional output decreased significantly, completing just six works after leaving Russia. By 1942, his declining health led him to move to Beverly Hills, California, where he died in 1943.

== Life and career ==
=== 1873–1885: Ancestry and early years ===
Rachmaninoff was born on 1 April [O.S. 20 March] 1873 into a family of Russian aristocracy. (Note: While the Library of Congress lists Rachmaninoff's birthdate as 1 April, his birthdate is listed as 2 April [O.S. 21 March] 1873 on his grave, and he himself celebrated his birthdate on 2 April.) The family tradition claims descent from a legendary Vasily, nicknamed "Rachman", a supposed grandson of Stephen III of Moldavia. Rachmaninoff's family had strong musical and military leanings. His paternal grandfather, Arkady Alexandrovich, was a musician who had taken lessons from Irish composer John Field. His father, Vasily Arkadievich Rachmaninoff (1841–1916), was a retired army officer and amateur pianist. He married Lyubov Petrovna Butakova (1853–1929), the daughter of a wealthy army general who gave him five estates as part of her dowry. The couple had three sons: Vladimir, Sergei and Arkady and three daughters; Yelena, Sofia and Barbara; Sergei being their third child.

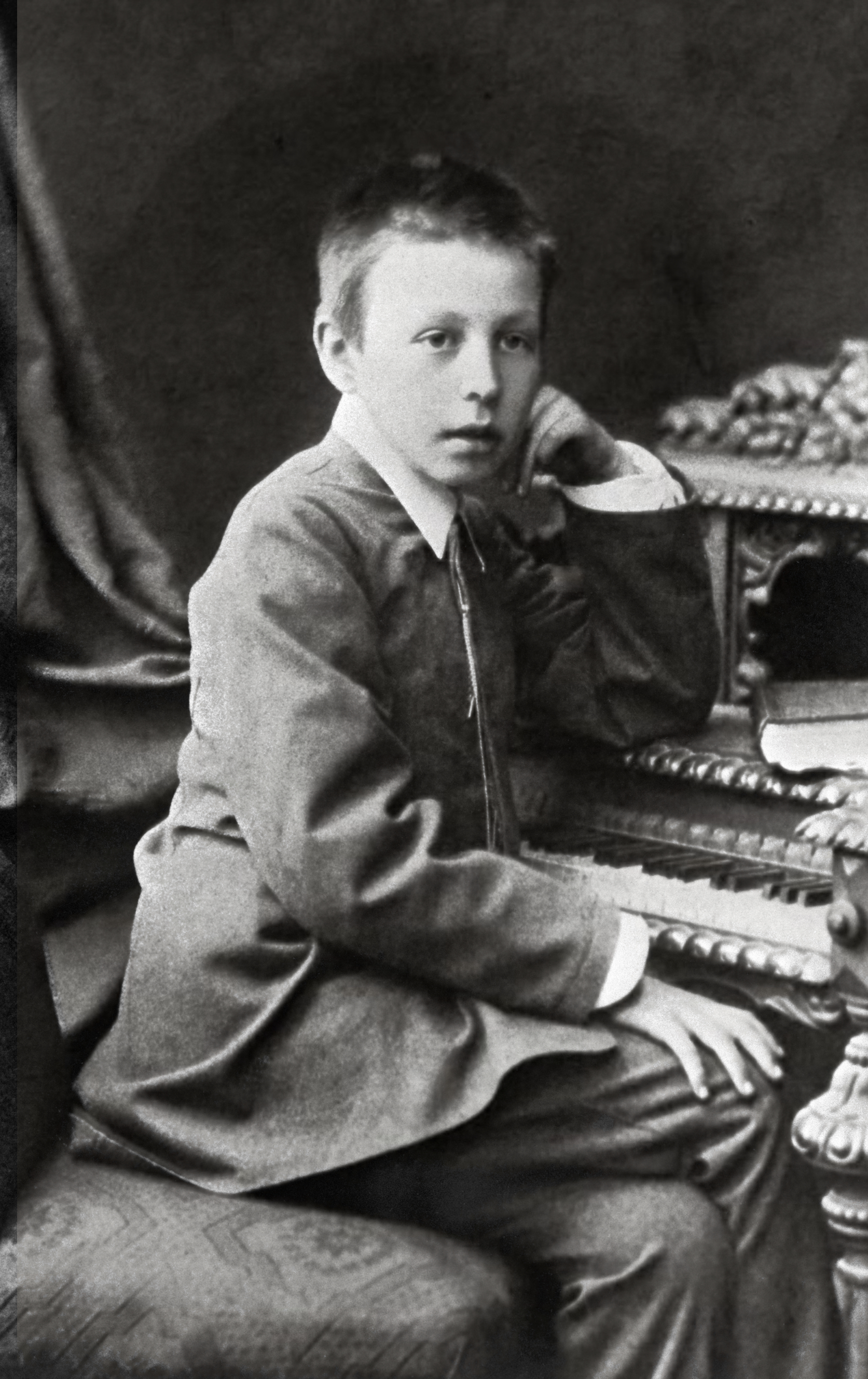
Rachmaninoff at age 12 in Saint Petersburg, Russia

Rachmaninoff was born in their family estate at the village of Semyonovo, near Staraya Russa, Novgorod Governorate. His birth was registered in the Semyonovo church book. After Sergei turned four, the family moved to their estate in Oneg, about 110 miles (180 km) north of Semyonovo, where he was raised until the age of nine. He mistakenly cited it as his birthplace in his adult life. Rachmaninoff began piano and music lessons organised by his mother at age four and noticed his ability to correctly reproduce passages from memory. Upon hearing news of the boy's gift, Arkady suggested she hire Anna Ornatskaya, a piano teacher and recent graduate of the Saint Petersburg Conservatory, to live with the family and give the young Sergei formal piano lessons. Rachmaninoff dedicated his famous romance for voice and piano "Spring Waters" from 12 Romances, Op. 14, to Ornatskaya.

Rachmaninoff's father wanted him to be trained by the Page Corps and then join the military. However, financial incompetence forced him to sell the family's five estates to pay off debts. Consequently, they could not afford this expensive military career. His older brother Vladimir was sent to an ordinary military college. The last estate in Oneg was auctioned off in 1882, and the family moved to a small flat in Saint Petersburg. In 1883, Ornatskaya arranged for Rachmaninoff, then 10, to study music at the Saint Petersburg Conservatory under her former teacher, Gustav Kross. Later that year, his sister Sofia died at the age of 13 of diphtheria. Also, his father, described by Rachmaninoff as a "compulsive gambler, a pathological liar and a skirt chaser", left the family for Moscow. His maternal grandmother, Sofia Litvikova Butakova, a widow of General Butakov, stepped in to help raise the children. She covered household expenses, and, with particular focus on their religious life, regularly took Rachmaninoff to Russian Orthodox Church services. There, he first encountered liturgical chants and church bells, two features he would incorporate in his compositions.

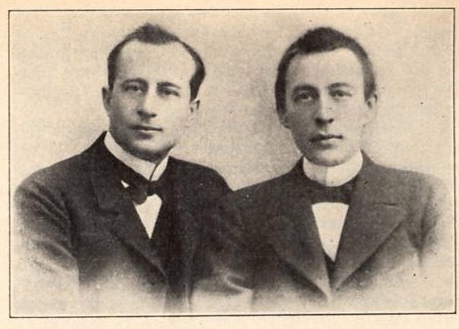
Alexander Siloti and Rachmaninoff

In 1885, Rachmaninoff suffered a further loss when his sister Yelena died at age 18 of pernicious anaemia. She was an important musical influence on Rachmaninoff and had introduced him to the works of Tchaikovsky. As a respite, his grandmother took him to a farm retreat by the Volkhov River. At the Conservatory, however, he had adopted a relaxed attitude. He played truant, failed his general education classes and purposely altered his report cards. Rachmaninoff performed at events held at the Moscow Conservatory during this time, including those attended by the Grand Duke Konstantin and other notable figures. However, upon his failing his spring exams, Ornatskaya notified his mother that his admission to further education might be revoked. His mother then sought advice from Alexander Siloti, her nephew, who was an accomplished pianist and a former student of Franz Liszt. He recommended that Rachmaninoff transfer to the Moscow Conservatory to study under his former piano teacher, the stricter Nikolai Zverev, which lasted until 1888.

=== 1885–1894: Moscow Conservatory and first compositions ===
In the autumn of 1885, Rachmaninoff moved in with Zverev, as was customary at the time, and stayed there for almost four years. During this time, he befriended fellow pupil Alexander Scriabin. While living in Zverev's home, Rachmaninoff shared a bedroom with three other students, and took turns practicing the piano for three hours each day. After two years of study, the fifteen-year-old Rachmaninoff was awarded a Rubinstein scholarship, and graduated from the lower division of the Conservatory. He then became a pupil of Siloti for advanced piano, studied counterpoint under Sergei Taneyev, and learned free composition from Anton Arensky. In 1889, a rift formed between Rachmaninoff and Zverev, now his adviser, after Zverev turned down the composer's request for assistance in renting a piano and greater privacy to compose. Zverev, who believed composition was a waste for talented pianists, refused to speak to Rachmaninoff for some time and arranged for him to live with the Satin family (Rachmaninoff's aunt, uncle, and their children) in Moscow. Rachmaninoff then found his first romance in Vera, the youngest daughter of the neighbouring Skalon family, but her mother objected and forbade Rachmaninoff to write to her, leaving him to correspond with her older sister Natalia. It is from these letters that many of Rachmaninoff's earliest compositions can be traced.

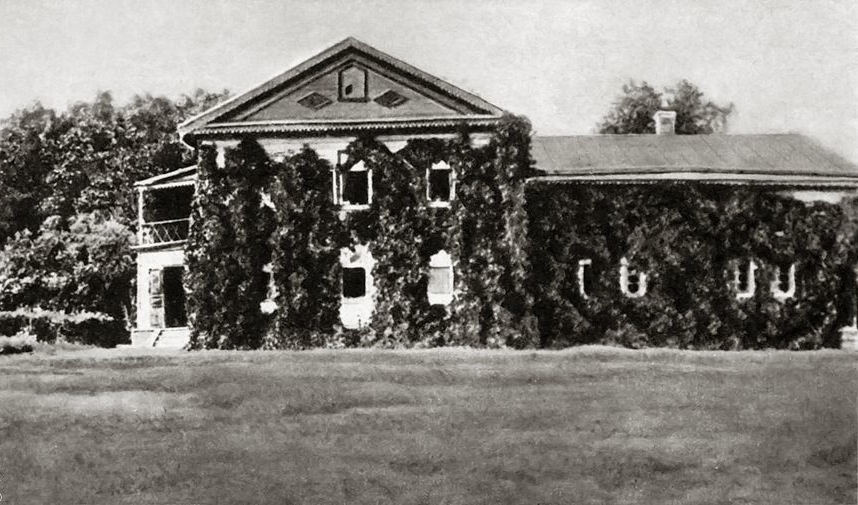
The Satin family's Ivanovka estate Rachmaninoff stayed and composed at

Rachmaninoff spent his summer break in 1890 with the Satins at Ivanovka in their private country estate near Tambov. He returned many times until 1917. The peaceful and bucolic surroundings became a source of inspiration for the composer. He completed many compositions while at the estate, including his Op. 1 in July 1891, Piano Concerto No. 1, and dedicated to Siloti. Also that year, Rachmaninoff completed the one-movement Youth Symphony and the symphonic poem Prince Rostislav. Siloti left the Moscow Conservatory after the academic year ended in 1891, and Rachmaninoff asked to take his final piano exams a year early to avoid being assigned a different teacher. He had little faith from Siloti and Conservatory director Vasily Safonov due to just three weeks' preparation. However, after being assisted by a recent graduate familiar with the tests, he passed each one with honours in July 1891. Three days later, he passed his annual theory and composition exams. His progress was unexpectedly halted in the latter half of 1891, when he contracted a severe case of malaria during his summer break at Ivanovka.

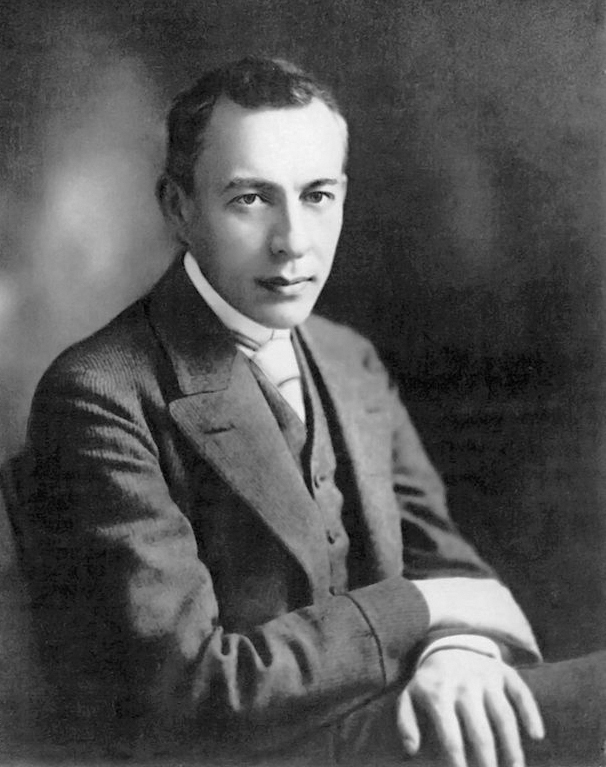
Sergei Rachmaninoff c. 1900

During his final year at the Conservatory, Rachmaninoff performed his first independent concert, where he premiered his Trio élégiaque No. 1 in January 1892, followed by a performance of the first movement of his Piano Concerto No. 1 two months later. His request to take his final theory and composition exams a year early was also granted, for which he wrote Aleko, a one-act opera based on the narrative poem The Gypsies by Alexander Pushkin, in seventeen days. It premiered in May 1892 at the Bolshoi Theatre; Tchaikovsky attended and praised Rachmaninoff for his work. Rachmaninoff believed it was "sure to fail", but the production was so successful the theatre agreed to produce it starring singer Feodor Chaliapin, who would go on to become a lifelong friend. Aleko earned Rachmaninoff the highest mark at the Conservatory and a Great Gold Medal, a distinction only previously awarded to Taneyev and Arseny Koreshchenko. Zverev, a member of the exam committee, gave the composer his gold watch, thus ending years of estrangement. On 29 May 1892, at age nineteen, Rachmaninoff graduated from the Conservatory with highest honors in both composition and piano, and was issued a diploma which allowed him to officially style himself as a "Free Artist".

After graduating, Rachmaninoff continued to compose and signed a publishing contract with Gutheil for 500 rubles. This agreement led to the publication of several of his early works, including "Aleko," "Two Pieces" (Op. 2), and "Six Songs" (Op. 4). Before this, he had earned 15 rubles per month by giving piano lessons at a girls' school. Rachmaninoff spent the summer of 1892 on the estate of Ivan Konavalov, a rich landowner in the Kostroma Oblast, and moved back with the Satins in the Arbat District. Delays in getting paid by Gutheil saw Rachmaninoff seeking other sources of income, which led to an engagement at the Moscow Electrical Exhibition in September 1892, his public debut as a pianist, where he premiered his landmark Prelude in C♯ minor from his five-part piano composition piece Morceaux de fantaisie (Op. 3). He was paid 50 rubles for his appearance. It was well received and became one of his most popular and enduring pieces. In 1893, he completed his tone poem The Rock, which he dedicated to Rimsky-Korsakov.

In 1893, Rachmaninoff spent a productive summer with friends at an estate in Kharkov Governorate where he composed several pieces, including Fantaisie-Tableaux (aka Suite No. 1, Op. 5) and Morceaux de salon (Op. 10). In September, he published Six Songs (Op. 8), a group of songs set to translations by Aleksey Pleshcheyev of Ukrainian and German poems. Rachmaninoff returned to Moscow, where Tchaikovsky agreed to conduct The Rock for an upcoming European tour. During his subsequent trip to Kiev to conduct performances of Aleko, he learned of Tchaikovsky's death from cholera. The news left Rachmaninoff stunned; later that day, he started work on his Trio élégiaque No. 2 for piano, violin and cello as a tribute, which he completed within a month. The music's aura of gloom reveals the depth and sincerity of Rachmaninoff's grief for his idol. The piece debuted at the first concert devoted to Rachmaninoff's compositions on 31 January 1894.

=== 1894–1900: Symphony No. 1, depression, and conducting debut ===
Rachmaninoff entered a decline following Tchaikovsky's death. He lacked the inspiration to compose, and the management of the Grand Theatre had lost interest in showcasing Aleko and dropped it from the program. To earn more money, Rachmaninoff returned to giving piano lessons—which he hated—and in late 1895, agreed to a three-month tour across Russia with a program shared by Italian violinist Teresina Tua. The tour was not enjoyable for the composer and he quit before it ended, thus sacrificing his performance fees. In a more desperate plea for money, Rachmaninoff pawned his gold watch given to him by Zverev. In September 1895, before the tour started, Rachmaninoff completed his Symphony No. 1 (Op. 13), a work conceived in January and based on chants he had heard in Russian Orthodox church services. Rachmaninoff had worked so hard on it that he could not return to composition until he heard the piece performed. This lasted until October 1896, when "a rather large sum of money" that did not belong to Rachmaninoff and was in his possession, was stolen during a train journey and he had to work to recoup the losses. Among the pieces composed were Six Choruses (Op. 15) and Six moments musicaux (Op. 16), his final completed composition for several months.

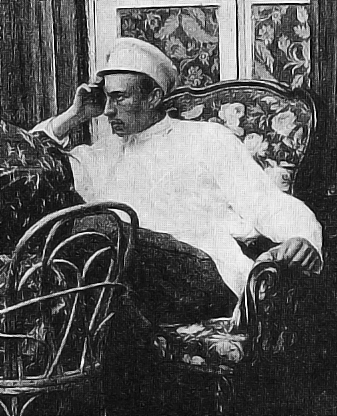
Rachmaninoff in 1897, the year his Symphony No. 1 premiered

Rachmaninoff's fortunes took a turn following the premiere of his Symphony No. 1 on 28 March 1897 in one of a long-running series of Russian Symphony Concerts devoted to Russian music. The piece was brutally panned by critic and nationalist composer César Cui, who likened it to a depiction of the seven plagues of Egypt, suggesting it would be admired by the "inmates" of a music conservatory in Hell. The deficiencies of the performance, conducted by Alexander Glazunov, were not commented on by other critics, but according to a memoir from Alexander Ossovsky, a close friend of Rachmaninoff, Glazunov made poor use of rehearsal time, and the concert's program itself, which contained two other premières, was also a factor. Other witnesses, including Rachmaninoff's wife, suggested that Glazunov, an alcoholic, had been drunk. Following the reaction to his first symphony, Rachmaninoff wrote in May 1897 that "I'm not at all affected" by its lack of success or critical reaction, but felt "deeply distressed and heavily depressed by the fact that my Symphony ... did not please me at all after its first rehearsal". He thought its performance was poor, particularly Glazunov's contribution. The piece was not performed for the rest of Rachmaninoff's life, but he revised it into a four-hand piano arrangement in 1898.

Rachmaninoff experienced a depression that lasted three years, during which he struggled with writer's block and composed very little music. He described this period as being "like a man who had suffered a stroke and for a long time had lost the use of his head and hands." To support himself, he gave piano lessons. A stroke of good fortune came from Savva Mamontov, a Russian industrialist and founder of the Moscow Private Russian Opera, who offered Rachmaninoff the post of assistant conductor for the 1897–98 season. The cash-strapped composer accepted, conducting Samson and Delilah by Camille Saint-Saëns as his first opera on 12 October 1897. By the end of February 1899, Rachmaninoff attempted composition and completed two short piano pieces, Morceau de Fantaisie and Fughetta in F major. Two months later, he travelled to London for the first time to perform and conduct, earning positive reviews. In late 1899, however, his depression worsened following an unproductive summer; he composed one song, "Fate", which later became one of his Twelve Songs (Op. 21), and left compositions for a proposed return visit to London unfulfilled. In an attempt to revive his desire to compose, his aunt arranged for the writer Leo Tolstoy, whom Rachmaninoff greatly admired, to have the composer visit his home and receive words of encouragement. The visit was unsuccessful, doing nothing to help him compose with the fluency he had before.

=== 1900–1906: Recovery, emergence, and conducting ===
After his devastating experience with Leo Tolstoy, his aunt suggested professional help, having received successful treatment from a family friend, physician and amateur musician Nikolai Dahl, to which Rachmaninoff agreed without resistance. Between January and April 1900, Rachmaninoff underwent hypnotherapy and supportive therapy sessions with Dahl on a daily basis for over 3 months, specifically structured to improve his sleep patterns, mood, and appetite and reignite his desire to compose. That summer, Rachmaninoff felt that "new musical ideas began to stir" and successfully resumed composition.

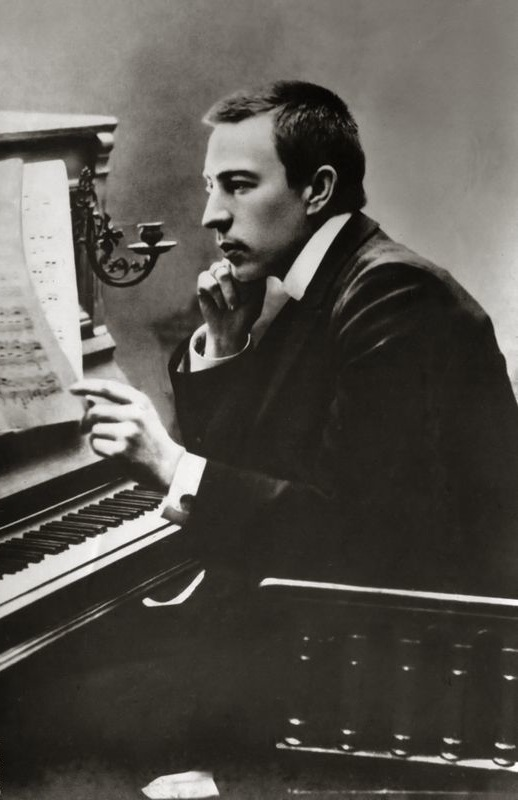
Rachmaninoff in the early 1900s

In July 1900, Rachmaninoff finally composed the "Love Duet", a key scene in the opera Francesca da Rimini, which was to be completed in 1906. This song was written earlier than his Piano Concerto No.2, and the "Love Duet" became an important work that marked Rachmaninoff's rebirth as a composer.

That autumn he began working on the Piano Concerto No. 2, which was finished in April 1901; it is dedicated to Dahl. After the second and third movement premiered in December 1900 with Rachmaninoff as the soloist, the entire piece was first performed in 1901 and was enthusiastically received. The piece earned the composer a Glinka Award, the first of five awarded to him throughout his life, and a 500-ruble prize in 1904.

By the end of 1901, the Cello Sonata was completed (first draft November 20, premiere December 2, revised version December 12).

Amid his professional career success, Rachmaninoff married Natalia Satina on 12 May 1902 after a three-year engagement. Because they were first cousins, the marriage was forbidden under a Canon law imposed by the Russian Orthodox Church; in addition, Rachmaninoff was not a regular church attendee and avoided confession, two things a priest would have had to confirm that he did in signing a marriage certificate. To circumvent the church's opposition, the couple used their military background and organised a small ceremony in a chapel in a Moscow suburb army barracks with Siloti and the cellist Anatoliy Brandukov as best men. They received the smaller of two houses at the Ivanovka estate as a present and went on a three-month honeymoon across Europe. Upon their return, they settled in Moscow, where Rachmaninoff resumed work as a music teacher at St. Catherine's Women's College and the Elizabeth Institute. By February 1903 he had completed his largest piano composition of his career at the time, the Variations on a Theme of Chopin (Op. 22). On 14 May 1903, the couple's first daughter, Irina Sergeyevna Rachmaninova, was born. During their summer break at Ivanovka, the family was struck with illness.

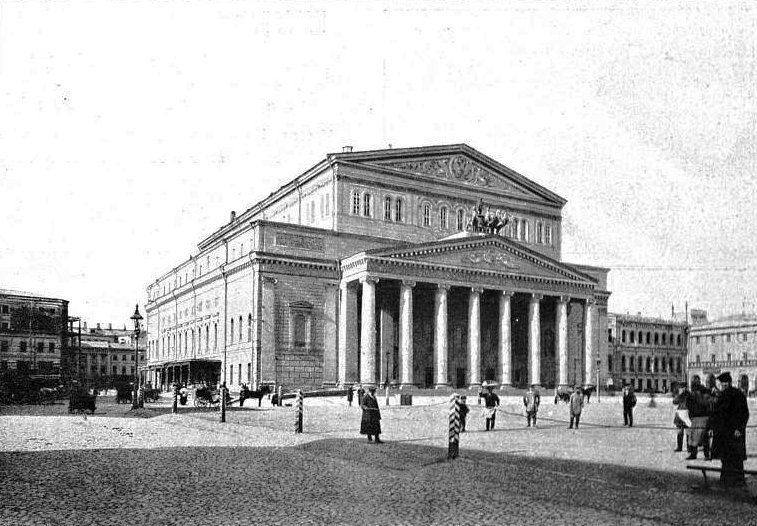
The Bolshoi Theatre in 1905, during Rachmaninoff's time as conductor

In 1904, in a career change, Rachmaninoff agreed to become the conductor at the Bolshoi Theatre for two seasons. He earned a mixed reputation during his time at the post, enforcing strict discipline and demanding high standards of performance. Influenced by Richard Wagner, he pioneered the modern arrangement of the orchestra players in the pit and the modern custom of standing while conducting. He also worked with each soloist on their part, even accompanying them on the piano. The theatre staged the premiere of his operas The Miserly Knight and Francesca da Rimini.

In the course of his second season as conductor, Rachmaninoff lost interest in his post. The social and political unrest surrounding the 1905 Revolution was beginning to affect the performers and theatre staff, who staged protests and demands for improved wages and conditions. Rachmaninoff remained largely uninterested in the politics surrounding him and the revolutionary spirit had made working conditions increasingly difficult. In February 1906, after conducting 50 performances in the first season and 39 in the second, Rachmaninoff handed in his resignation. He then took his family on an extended tour around Italy with the hope of completing new works, but illness struck his wife and daughter, and they returned to Ivanovka. Money soon became an issue following Rachmaninoff's resignation from his posts at St. Catherine's and Elizabeth schools, leaving him only the option of composing.

=== 1906–1917: Move to Dresden and first US tour ===
Increasingly unhappy with the political turmoil in Russia and in need of seclusion from his lively social life to be able to compose, Rachmaninoff and his family left Moscow for Dresden, Germany, in November 1906. The city had become a favourite of both Rachmaninoff and Natalia, and they stayed there until 1909, only returning to Russia for their summer breaks at Ivanovka. In Paris, during the summer of 1907, he saw a black and white reproduction of The Isle of the Dead by Arnold Böcklin, which served as the inspiration for his orchestral work of the same name, Op. 29. Despite occasional periods of depression, apathy, and little faith in any of his work, Rachmaninoff started on his Symphony No. 2 (Op. 27) in 1906, twelve years after the disastrous premiere of his first. While writing it, Rachmaninoff and the family returned to Russia, but the composer detoured to Paris to take part in Sergei Diaghilev's season of Russian concerts in May 1907. His performance as the soloist in his Piano Concerto No. 2 with an encore of his Prelude in C♯ minor was a triumphant success. Rachmaninoff regained his sense of self-worth following the enthusiastic reaction to the premiere of his Symphony No. 2 in early 1908, which earned him his second Glinka Award and 1,000 roubles.

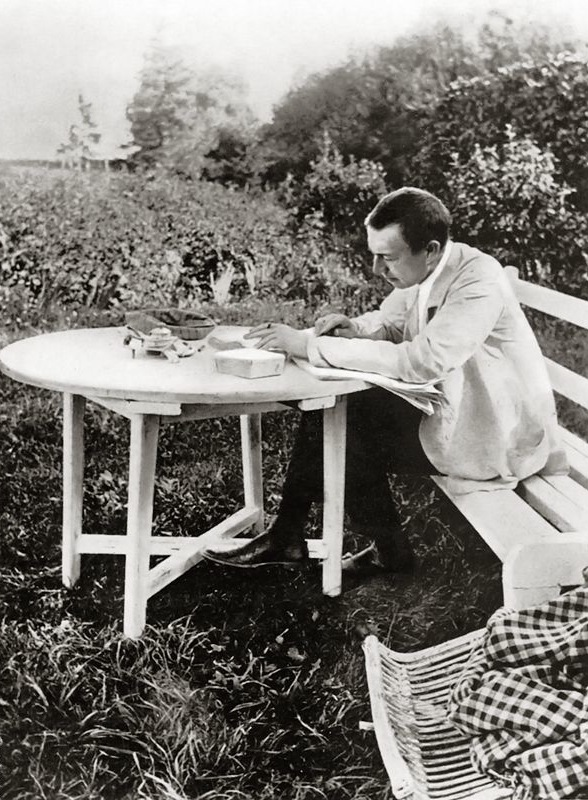
Rachmaninoff proofing his Piano Concerto No. 3 at the Ivanovka estate, 1910

While in Dresden, Rachmaninoff agreed to perform and conduct in the United States as part of the 1909–10 concert season with conductor Max Fiedler and the Boston Symphony Orchestra. He spent time during breaks at Ivanovka finishing a new piece specially for the visit, his Piano Concerto No. 3, Op. 30, which he dedicated to Josef Hofmann. The tour saw the composer make 26 performances, 19 as pianist and 7 as conductor, which marked his first recitals without another performer in the program. His first appearance was at Smith College in Northampton, Massachusetts for a recital on 4 November 1909. The second performance of Piano Concerto No. 3 by the New York Symphony Orchestra was conducted by Gustav Mahler in New York City with the composer as soloist, an experience he personally treasured. Though the tour increased the composer's popularity in America, he declined subsequent offers due to the length of time away from Russia and his family.

Upon his return home in February 1910, Rachmaninoff became vice president of the Imperial Russian Musical Society (IRMS), whose president was a member of the royal family. Later in 1910, Rachmaninoff completed his choral work Liturgy of St. John Chrysostom, Op. 31, but it was banned from performance as it did not follow the format of a typical liturgical church service. For two seasons between 1911 and 1913, Rachmaninoff was appointed permanent conductor of the Philharmonic Society of Moscow; he helped raise its profile and increase audience numbers and receipts. In 1912, Rachmaninoff left the IRMS when he learned that a musician in an administrative post was dismissed for being Jewish.

Soon after his resignation, an exhausted Rachmaninoff sought time for composition and took his family on holiday to Switzerland. They left after one month for Rome for a visit that became a particularly tranquil and influential period for the composer, who lived alone in a small apartment on Piazza di Spagna while his family stayed at a boardinghouse. While there he received an anonymous letter that contained a Russian translation of Edgar Allan Poe's poem The Bells by Konstantin Balmont, which affected him greatly, and he began work on his choral symphony of the same title, Op. 35, based on it. By 1912, Rachmaninoff's second daughter Tatiana was born, and his contemporaneous period of composition ended abruptly when both Rachmaninoff's daughters contracted serious cases of typhoid and were treated in Berlin due to their father's greater trust in German doctors. After six weeks, the Rachmaninoffs returned to their Moscow flat. The composer conducted The Bells at its premiere in Saint Petersburg in late 1913.

In January 1914, Rachmaninoff began a concert tour of England which was enthusiastically received. He was too afraid to travel alone following the death of Raoul Pugno of an unexpected heart attack in his hotel room which left the composer wary of a similar fate. Following the outbreak of the First World War later that year, his position of Inspector of Music at Nobility High School for Girls put him in the group of government servants which prevented him from joining the army, yet the composer made regular charitable donations for the war effort. In 1915, Rachmaninoff completed his second major choral work, All-Night Vigil (Op. 37). It was received so warmly at its Moscow premiere in aid of war relief that four subsequent performances were quickly scheduled.

Alexander Scriabin's death in April 1915 was a tragedy for Rachmaninoff, who went on a piano recital tour devoted to his friend's compositions to raise funds for Scriabin's financially stricken widow. It marked his first public performances of works other than his own. During a vacation in Finland that summer, Rachmaninoff learned of Taneyev's death, a loss which affected him greatly. By year's end he had finished his 14 Romances, Op. 34, closing with Vocalise, a "song without words" which became one of his most popular pieces. Cellist Yuki Ito argued that Vocalise combines the embodiment of the spirit through music with the idea of Russian Symbolism, which sought to free words from meaning; as is the case with many of Rachmaninoff's masterpieces, the opening alludes to the Gregorian chant "Dies irae".

=== 1917–1925: Leaving Russia, emigration to the US, and concert pianist ===
On the day the February 1917 Revolution began in Saint Petersburg, Rachmaninoff performed a piano recital in Moscow in aid of wounded Russian soldiers who had fought in the war. He returned to Ivanovka two months later, finding it in chaos after a group of Social Revolutionary Party members seized it as their own communal property. Despite having invested most of his earnings on the estate, Rachmaninoff left the property after three weeks, vowing never to return. It was soon confiscated by the communist authorities and became derelict. In June 1917, Rachmaninoff asked Siloti to produce visas for him and his family so they could leave Russia, but Siloti was unable to help. After a break with his family in the more peaceful Crimea, Rachmaninoff's concert performance in Yalta on 5 September 1917 was to be his last in Russia. Upon returning to Moscow, the political tension surrounding the October Revolution found the composer keeping his family safe indoors and being involved in a collective at his apartment building where he attended committee meetings and kept guard at night. He completed revisions to his Piano Concerto No. 1 among gunshots and rallies outside.

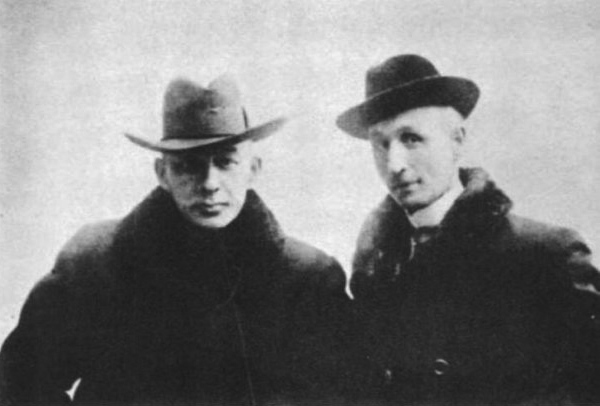
Rachmaninoff and Struve, 1918

Amidst such turmoil, Rachmaninoff received an unexpected offer to perform ten piano recitals across Scandinavia, which he immediately accepted, using it as an excuse to obtain permits so he and his family could leave the country. On 22 December 1917, they left Saint Petersburg by train to the Finnish border, from where they travelled through Finland on an open sled and train to Helsinki. Carrying what they could pack into their small suitcases, Rachmaninoff brought some sketches of compositions and scores to the first act of his unfinished opera Monna Vanna and Rimsky-Korsakov's opera The Golden Cockerel. They arrived in Stockholm, Sweden, on 24 December. In January 1918, they relocated to Copenhagen, Denmark, and, with the help of friend and composer Nikolai Struve (1875–1920), settled on the ground floor of a house. In debt and in need of money, the 44-year-old Rachmaninoff chose performing as his main source of income, as a career solely in composition was too restrictive. His piano repertoire was small, which prompted the start of regular practice of his technique and learning new pieces to play. Rachmaninoff toured between February and October 1918.

During the Scandinavian tour, Rachmaninoff received three offers from the US: to become the conductor of the Cincinnati Symphony Orchestra for two years, to conduct 110 concerts in 30 weeks for the Boston Symphony Orchestra, and to give 25 piano recitals. He was worried about such a commitment in an unfamiliar country and had few good memories from his debut tour in 1909, so he declined all three. Not long after his decision, Rachmaninoff considered the United States financially advantageous as he could not support his family through composition alone. Unable to afford the travel fees, he was sent an advance loan for the journey by Russian banker and fellow emigre Alexander Kamenka. Money was also received from friends and admirers; pianist Ignaz Friedman contributed $2,000. On 1 November 1918, the Rachmaninoffs boarded the SS Bergensfjord in Oslo, Norway, bound for New York City, arriving eleven days later. News of the composer's arrival spread, causing a crowd of musicians, artists, and fans to gather outside the Sherry-Netherland hotel, where he was staying.

Rachmaninoff quickly dealt with business, hiring pianist Dagmar de Corval Rybner as his secretary, interpreter, and aide in dealing with American life. He reunited with Josef Hofmann, who informed several concert managers that the composer was available and suggested he choose Charles Ellis as his booking agent. Ellis organised 36 performances for Rachmaninoff for the upcoming 1918–1919 concert season; the first, a piano recital, took place on 8 December at Providence, Rhode Island. Rachmaninoff, still in recovery from a case of the Spanish flu, included his arrangement of "The Star-Spangled Banner" in the program. Before the tour he had received offers from numerous piano manufacturers to tour with their instruments; he chose Steinway, the only one that did not offer him money. Steinway's association with Rachmaninoff continued for the rest of his life.

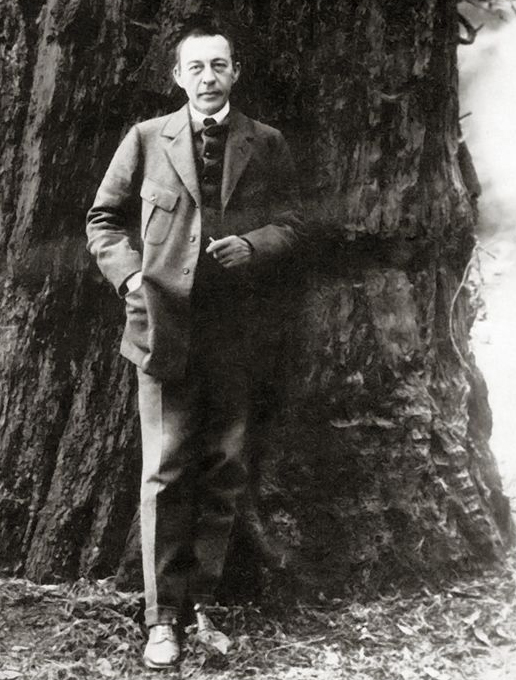
Rachmaninoff in front of a Redwood tree in California, 1919

After the first tour ended in April 1919, Rachmaninoff took his family on a break to San Francisco. He recuperated and prepared for the upcoming season, a cycle that he would adopt for most of his remaining life. As a touring performer Rachmaninoff became financially secure without much difficulty, and the family lived an upper middle class life with servants, a chef, and chauffeur. They recreated the atmosphere of Ivanovka in their New York City apartment by entertaining Russian guests, employing Russians, and continuing to observe Russian customs. Despite the ability to speak some English, Rachmaninoff had his correspondence translated into Russian. He enjoyed some personal luxuries, including quality tailored suits and the latest models of cars.

In 1920, Rachmaninoff signed a recording contract with the Victor Talking Machine Company which earned him some much needed income and began his longtime association with RCA. During a family holiday in Goshen, New York, that summer he learned of Struve's accidental death, prompting Rachmaninoff to strengthen the ties he had with those still in Russia by arranging with his bank to send regular money and food parcels to his family, friends, students, and those in need. Early 1921 saw Rachmaninoff apply for documentation to visit Russia, the only time he would do so after leaving the country, but progress ceased when he underwent surgery for pain in his right temple. The operation failed to relieve his symptoms and relief only came after having dental work years later. After leaving the hospital, he purchased an apartment on 33 Riverside Drive on the Upper West Side of Manhattan, overlooking the Hudson River.

Rachmaninoff's first visit to Europe since emigrating occurred in May 1922, with concerts in London. This was followed by the Rachmaninoffs and the Satins reuniting in Dresden, after which the composer prepared for a hectic 1922–1923 concert season of 71 performances in five months. For a while, he rented a railway carriage that was fitted with a piano and belongings to save time with suitcases. In 1924, Rachmaninoff declined an invitation to become conductor of the Boston Symphony Orchestra. In 1925, Rachmaninoff's first daughter, Irina, became widowed while pregnant with his granddaughter, Sophie Volkonsky. Subsequently, Rachmaninoff founded TAIR — a publishing company named after his daughters, Tatiana and Irina. Based in Paris, TAIR specialised in works by Rachmaninoff and by other Russian composers.

In 1923, Rachmaninoff invested $5,000 into the struggling Sikorsky Aero Engineering Corporation, helping Igor Sikorsky develop the S-29A aircraft.

=== 1926–1942: Touring, final compositions, and Villa Senar ===
Rachmaninoff's life as a touring performer, and the demanding schedules that came with it, caused his compositional output to slow significantly. In the 24 years between his arrival in the US and his death, he completed just six new pieces, revised some of his earlier works, and wrote piano transcriptions for his live repertoire. He admitted that by leaving Russia, "I left behind my desire to compose: losing my country, I lost myself also". In 1926, having concentrated on touring for the past eight years, he took a year off and completed the Piano Concerto No. 4, which he had started in 1917, and Three Russian Songs, which he dedicated to Leopold Stokowski.

Rachmaninoff sought the company of fellow Russian musicians and befriended pianist Vladimir Horowitz in 1928. The men remained supportive of each other's work, each making a point of attending concerts given by the other, and Horowitz remained a champion of Rachmaninoff's works and in particular his Piano Concerto No. 3. In 1930, in a rare occurrence, Rachmaninoff allowed Italian composer Ottorino Respighi to orchestrate pieces from his Études-Tableaux, Op. 33 (1911) and the Études-Tableaux, Op. 39 (1917), giving Respighi the inspirations behind the compositions. By December 1931, his daughter was engaged to marry Boris Conus, with a second grandchild Alexander Conus born later to the couple. In 1931, Rachmaninoff and several others signed an article in The New York Times that criticised the cultural policies of the Soviet Union. The composer's music suffered a boycott in the Soviet Union as a result from the backlash in the Soviet press, lasting until 1933.

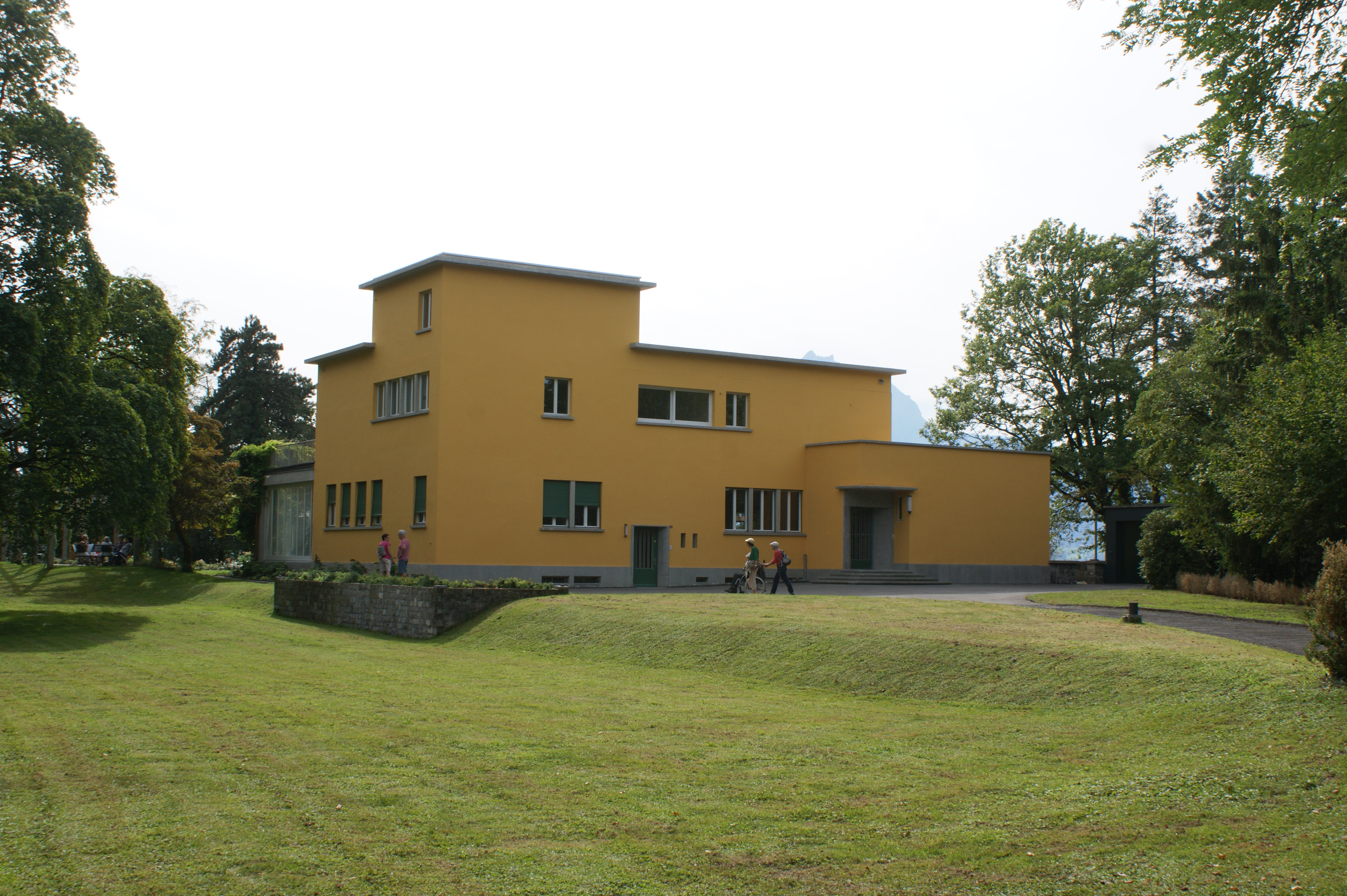
Villa Senar, where the Rhapsody on a Theme of Paganini and Symphony No. 3 were composed

From 1929 to 1931, Rachmaninoff spent his summers in France at Clairefontaine-en-Yvelines near Rambouillet, meeting with fellow Russian émigrés and his daughters. By 1930, his desire to compose had returned and he sought a new location to write new pieces. He bought a plot of land near Hertenstein on the banks of Lake Lucerne, Switzerland, and oversaw the construction of his home which he named Villa Senar after the first two letters of his and his wife's name, adding the "r" from the family name. Rachmaninoff spent his summers at Villa Senar until 1939, often with his daughters and grandchildren, with whom he would drive his motorboat on Lake Lucerne, one of his favourite activities. In the comfort of his own home, Rachmaninoff completed Rhapsody on a Theme of Paganini in 1934 and the Symphony No. 3 in 1936.

In October 1932, Rachmaninoff began a demanding concert season that consisted of 50 performances. The tour marked the fortieth anniversary of his debut as a pianist, for which several of his Russian friends now living in America sent him a scroll and wreath in celebration. The frail economic situation in the US resulted in the composer performing to smaller audiences, and he lost money in his investments and shares. The European leg of this tour in 1933 saw Rachmaninoff celebrate his sixtieth birthday among fellow musicians and friends, after which he retreated to Villa Senar for the summer. Returning to the US in early 1934, Rachmaninoff accepted a role as trustee of Ithaca College. That May, he underwent a minor operation. Two years later, he retreated to Aix-les-Bains in France to improve his arthritis. During a visit to Villa Senar in 1937, Rachmaninoff entered talks with choreographer Michel Fokine about a ballet based on Niccolò Paganini that was to feature his rhapsody. It premiered in London in 1939 with the composer's daughters in attendance. In 1938, Rachmaninoff performed his Piano Concerto No. 2 at a charity jubilee concert at London's Royal Albert Hall to celebrate Henry Wood, founder of the Promenade concerts and an admirer of Rachmaninoff's who wanted him to be the show's only soloist. Rachmaninoff agreed, so long as the performance was not broadcast on the radio due to his aversion to the medium.

The 1939–40 concert season saw Rachmaninoff perform fewer concerts than usual, totalling 43 appearances that were mostly in the US. The tour continued with dates across England, after which Rachmaninoff visited his daughter Tatyana in Paris followed by a return to Villa Senar. He was unable to perform for a while after slipping on the floor at the villa and injuring himself. He recovered enough to perform at the Lucerne International Music Festival on 11 August 1939. It was to be his final concert in Europe. With World War II imminent, he returned to Paris two days later, where he, his wife, and two daughters were together for the last time before the composer left Europe on 23 August. With financial help from Rachmaninoff, philosopher Ivan Ilyin was able to pay the bail and settle in Switzerland. Rachmaninoff would support the Soviet Union's war effort against Nazi Germany from mid-1941 onwards, donating receipts from many of his concerts for the benefit of the Red Army.

Upon his return to the US, Rachmaninoff performed with the Philadelphia Orchestra in New York City with conductor Eugene Ormandy on 26 November and 3 December 1939, as part of the orchestra's special series of concerts dedicated to the composer in celebration of the thirtieth anniversary of his US debut. The final concert on 10 December saw Rachmaninoff conduct his Symphony No. 3 and The Bells, marking his first conducting performance since 1917. The concert season left Rachmaninoff tired, and he spent the summer resting from minor surgery at Orchard's Point, an estate near Huntington, New York on Long Island. During this period Rachmaninoff completed his final composition, the Symphonic Dances, Op. 45, which was premiered by Ormandy and the Philadelphia Orchestra in January 1941, with Rachmaninoff in attendance. In December 1939, Rachmaninoff began an extensive recording period which lasted until February 1942 and included his Piano Concerto Nos. 1 and 3 and Symphony No. 3 at the Philadelphia Academy of Music.

=== 1942–1943: Illness, move to California, and death ===
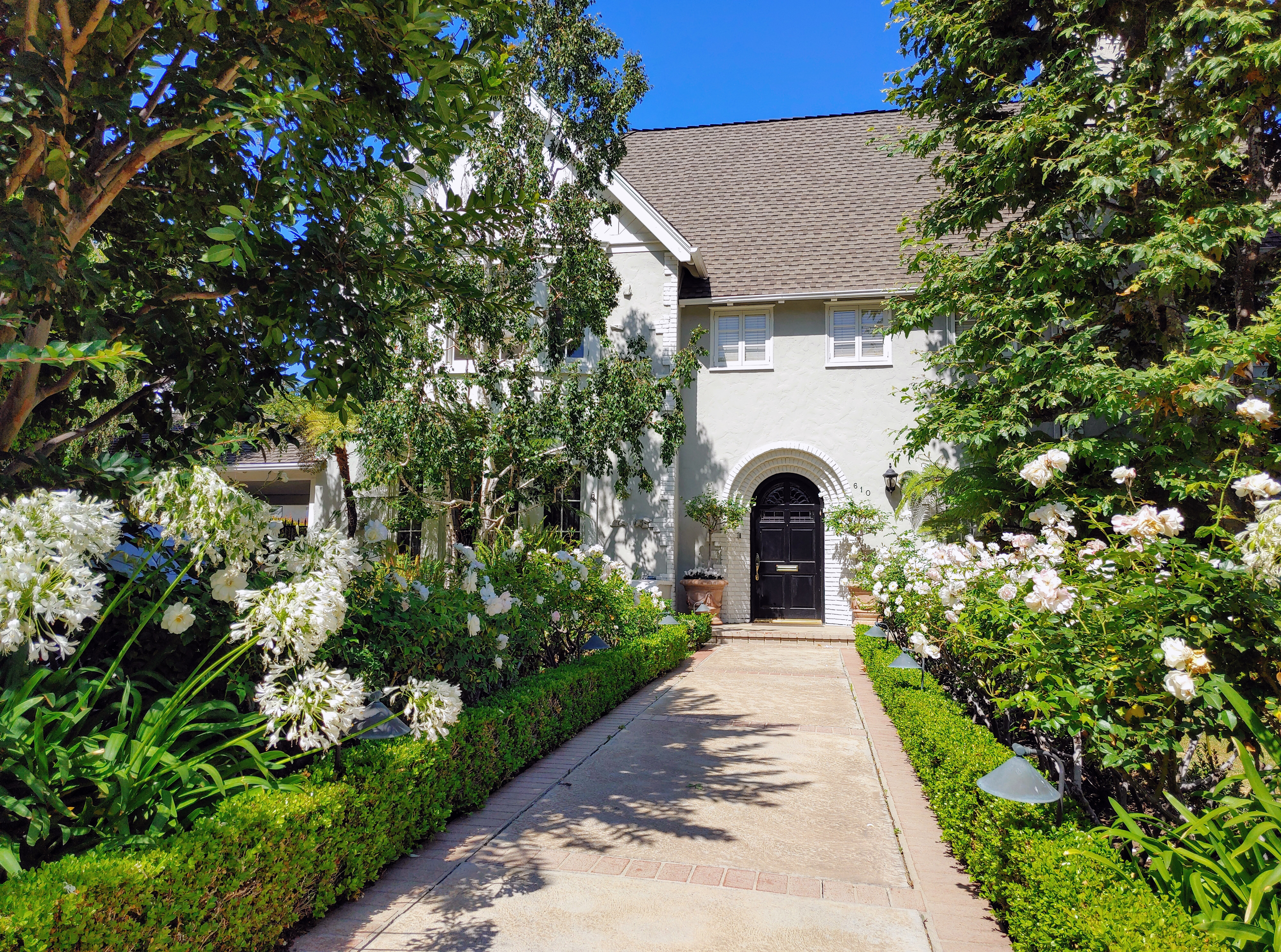
Sergei Rachmaninoff house at 610 North Elm Drive in Beverly Hills

In early 1942, Rachmaninoff was advised by his doctor to relocate to a warmer climate to improve his health after suffering from sclerosis, lumbago, neuralgia, high blood pressure, and headaches. After he completed his final studio recording sessions during this time in February, a move to Long Island fell through after the composer and his wife expressed a greater interest in California, and initially settled in a leased home on Tower Road in Beverly Hills in May. In June they purchased a home at 610 North Elm Drive in Beverly Hills, living close to Horowitz who would often visit and perform piano duets with Rachmaninoff. Later in 1942, Rachmaninoff invited Igor Stravinsky to dinner, the two sharing their worries of a war-torn Russia and their children in France.

Shortly after a performance at the Hollywood Bowl in July 1942, Rachmaninoff was suffering from lumbago and fatigue. He informed his doctor, Alexander Golitsyn, that the upcoming 1942–43 concert season would be his last, in order to dedicate his time to composition. The tour began on 12 October 1942 and the composer received many positive reviews from critics despite his deteriorating health. Rachmaninoff and his wife Natalia were among the 220 people who became naturalised American citizens at a ceremony held in New York City on 1 February 1943.

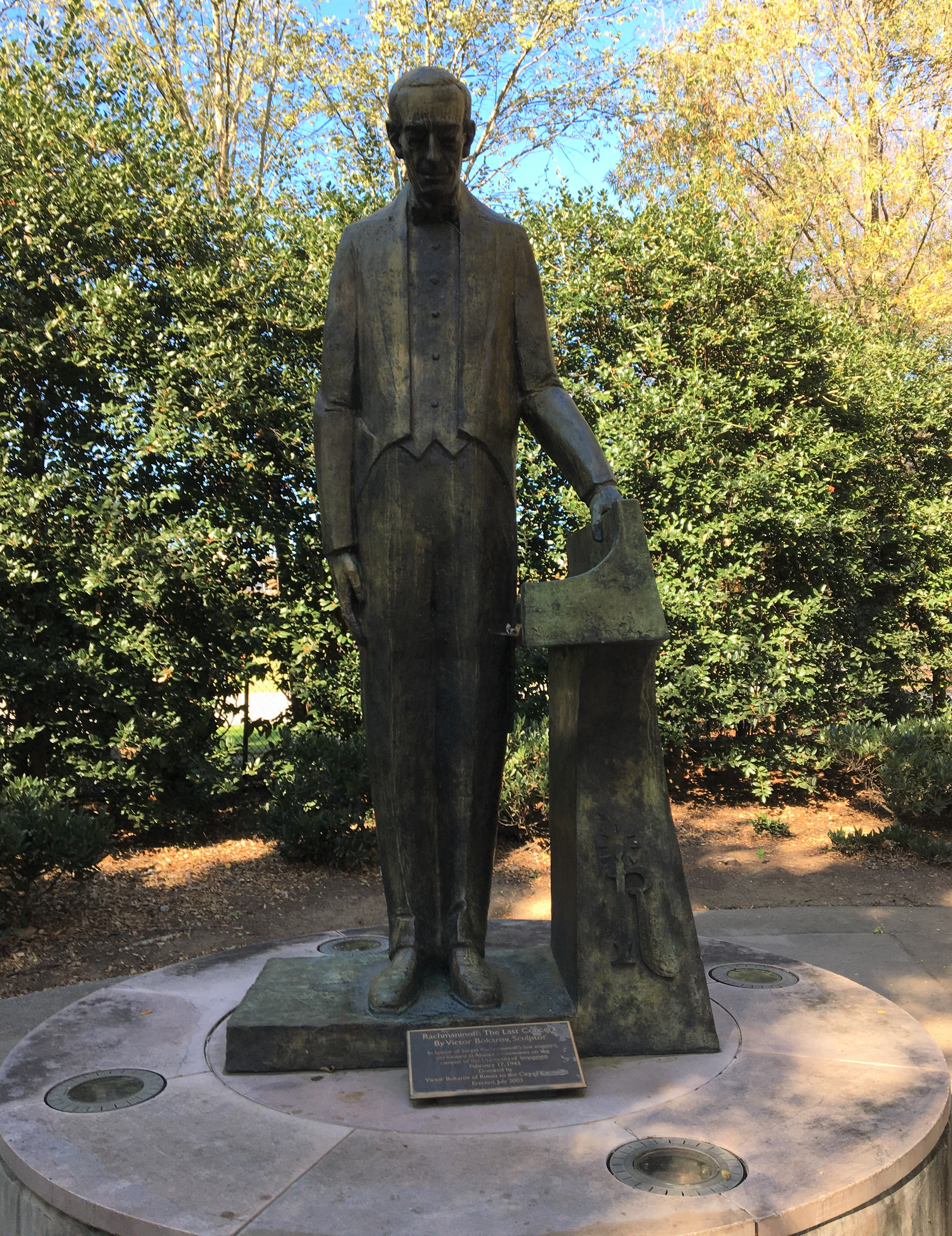
Statue in memory of Rachmaninoff's last concert, in Knoxville, Tennessee

Later that month he complained of persistent cough and back pain; a doctor diagnosed him with pleurisy and advised that a warmer climate would aid in his recovery. Rachmaninoff opted to continue with touring, but felt so ill during his travels to Florida that the remaining dates were cancelled and he returned to California by train, where an ambulance took him to hospital. It was then that Rachmaninoff was diagnosed with an aggressive form of melanoma. His wife took Rachmaninoff home where he reunited with his daughter Irina. His last appearances as a concerto soloist, playing Beethoven's First Piano Concerto and his Rhapsody on a Theme of Paganini, were on 11 and 12 February with the Chicago Symphony Orchestra under the baton of Hans Lange, and on 17 February, at the University of Tennessee in Knoxville, Tennessee, he gave his last recital as a pianist.

Rachmaninoff's health rapidly declined in the last week of March 1943. He lost his appetite, had constant pain in his arms and sides, and found it increasingly difficult to breathe. The composer lost consciousness and he died two days later, on 28 March 1943, at his home in Beverly Hills, at age 69. A message with greetings from several Moscow composers arrived too late for Rachmaninoff to read. His funeral took place at the Holy Virgin Mary Russian Orthodox Church on Micheltorena Street in Silver Lake. In his will, Rachmaninoff wished to be buried at Novodevichy Cemetery in Moscow, where Scriabin, Taneyev, and Chekhov were buried, but his American citizenship made that impossible. Instead, he was interred at Kensico Cemetery in Valhalla, New York.

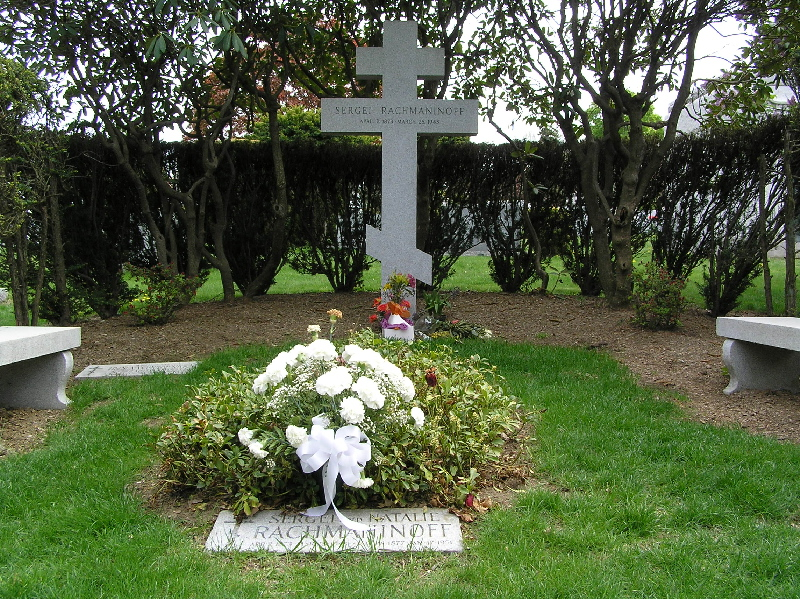
Rachmaninoff's grave at Kensico Cemetery in May 2006

After Rachmaninoff's death, poet Marietta Shaginyan published fifteen letters they exchanged from their first contact in February 1912 and their final meeting in July 1917. The nature of their relationship bordered on romantic, but was primarily intellectual and emotional. Shaginyan and the poetry she shared with Rachmaninoff have been cited as the inspiration for his Six Songs, Op. 38.

== Music ==
=== Influences ===
A major influence on Rachmaninoff as a composer was Tchaikovsky. This influence can be seen throughout Rachmaninoff's early compositions, such as in his Youth Symphony, which is reminiscent of Tchaikovsky's late symphonies, sections of his symphonic poem Prince Rostislav, which emulates The Tempest and Romeo and Juliet, and his youthful Three Nocturnes, the third of which contains a chordal section very similar to the opening of Tchaikovsky's First Piano Concerto. His first opera, Aleko shows the influence of Tchaikovsky in both its harmonies, and in its allusions and references to Eugene Onegin. Tchaikovsky was also particularly influential on Rachmaninoff's melodic writing, though musicologist Stephen Walsh describes Rachmaninoff's melodies as lacking the range or length of Tchaikovsky's.

The influence of Anton Arensky, who taught Rachmaninoff for five years while he was at the Moscow Conservatory, can be seen in the composer's early compositions. This influence can be seen, for example, in his symphonic poem Prince Rostislav, dedicated to Arensky, and a number of compositions from his student years may have been written as exercises for his teacher. According to biographer Barrie Martyn, the "obviously Russian character" and "Tchaikovskian lyricism" of Arensky's music were elements which were also part of Rachmaninoff's compositional style. Sergei Taneyev, Rachmaninoff's teacher in counterpoint at the Moscow Conservatory, was also an influence on his early compositions, and Rachmaninoff would bring his compositions to Taneyev to gain his approval all the way up to 1915, the year in which Taneyev died. In his later style, the influence of Rimsky-Korsakov can be seen in the increasingly chromatic harmonies and thinner orchestration in Rachmaninoff's compositions from his Third Piano Concerto onwards.

=== Works ===
The cadenza of the Piano Concerto No. 3 is famous for its grand chords.

Rachmaninoff wrote five works for piano and orchestra: four concertos—No. 1 in F♯ minor, Op. 1 (1891, revised 1917), No. 2 in C minor, Op. 18 (1900–01), No. 3 in D minor, Op. 30 (1909), and No. 4 in G minor, Op. 40 (1926, revised 1928 and 1941)—and the Rhapsody on a Theme of Paganini (1934). Of the concertos, the Second and Third are the most popular.

Rachmaninoff also composed a number of works for orchestra alone. The three symphonies: No. 1 in D minor, Op. 13 (1895), No. 2 in E minor, Op. 27 (1907), and No. 3 in A minor, Op. 44 (1935–36). Widely spaced chronologically, the symphonies represent three distinct phases in his compositional development. The Second has been the most popular of the three since its first performance. Among Rachmaninoff's other orchestral works are his Symphonic Dances (Op. 45), his last major composition, and his four symphonic poems: Prince Rostislav, The Rock (Op. 7), Caprice bohémien (Op. 12), and The Isle of the Dead (Op. 29).

As Rachmaninoff was a skilled pianist, a large portion of his compositional output consists of works for solo piano. They include 24 Preludes traversing all 24 major and minor keys; Prelude in C♯ minor (Op. 3, No. 2) from Morceaux de fantaisie (Op. 3); ten preludes in Op. 23; and thirteen in Op. 32. Especially difficult are the two sets of Études-Tableaux, Op. 33 and 39, which are very demanding study pictures. Stylistically, Op. 33 hearkens back to the preludes, while Op. 39 shows the influences of Scriabin and Prokofiev. There are also the Morceaux de salon (Op. 10), Six moments musicaux (Op. 16), the Variations on a Theme of Chopin (Op. 22), and the Variations on a Theme of Corelli (Op. 42). He wrote two piano sonatas, both of which are large scale and virtuosic in their technical demands. Rachmaninoff also composed works for two pianos, four hands, including two Suites (Opp. 5 and 17, the first subtitled Fantasie-Tableaux), Morceaux (Op. 11), a version of the Symphonic Dances (Op. 45), and an arrangement of the C♯ minor Prelude, as well as a Russian Rhapsody, and he arranged his First Symphony (below) for piano four hands. Both these works were published posthumously.

Rachmaninoff wrote two major a cappella choral works—the Liturgy of St. John Chrysostom and the All-Night Vigil (also known as the Vespers). It was the fifth movement of All-Night Vigil that Rachmaninoff requested to have sung at his funeral. Other choral works include a choral symphony, The Bells; the cantata Spring; the Three Russian Songs; and an early Concerto for Choir (a cappella).

He completed three one-act operas: Aleko (1892), The Miserly Knight (1903), and Francesca da Rimini (1904). He started three others, notably Monna Vanna, based on the work by Maurice Maeterlinck; copyright in this had been extended to the composer Février, and, though the restriction did not pertain to Russia, Rachmaninoff dropped the project after completing act 1 in piano vocal score in 1908. (Note: This act was later orchestrated by Igor Buketoff in 1984, and performed in the U.S.) Aleko is regularly performed and has been recorded complete at least eight times, and filmed. The Miserly Knight adheres to Pushkin's "little tragedy". Francesca da Rimini was described by the composer as a "symphonic opera" because of its long interludes.

Rachmaninoff, similarly to many Russian composers of his time, wrote relatively little chamber music. His output in the genre includes two piano trios, both of which are named Trio Elégiaque (the second of which is a memorial tribute to Tchaikovsky), a Cello Sonata, and the Morceaux de salon for violin and piano.

Rachmaninoff composed a total of 83 songs (románsy in Russian) for voice and piano, all of which were written before he left Russia permanently in 1917. Most of his songs were set to texts by Russian romantic writers and poets, such as Alexander Pushkin, Mikhail Lermontov, Afanasy Fet, Anton Chekhov and Aleksey Tolstoy, among others. His most popular song is the wordless Vocalise, which he later arranged for orchestra.

=== Compositional style ===
Étude-Tableau in E♭ minor
Karine Gilanyan performing Étude-Tableau in E♭ minor, Op. 39, No. 5

"Vocalise" transcribed for violin and piano
"Vocalise" performed by Roxana Pavel (violin) and Monica Pavel (piano)

Élégie in E♭ minor
Élégie in E♭ minor (from the set Morceaux de fantaisie) performed by Oksana Yevsyukova (piano)

Rachmaninoff's style was initially influenced by Tchaikovsky. By the mid-1890s, however, his compositions began showing a more individual tone. His First Symphony has many original features. Its brutal gestures and uncompromising power of expression were unprecedented in Russian music at the time. Its flexible rhythms, sweeping lyricism, and stringent economy of thematic material were all features he kept and refined in subsequent works. Following the poor reception of the symphony and three years of inactivity, Rachmaninoff's individual style developed significantly. He started leaning towards broadly lyrical, often passionate melodies. His orchestration became subtler and more varied, with textures carefully contrasted. Overall, his writing became more concise.

Especially important is Rachmaninoff's use of unusually widely spaced chords for bell-like sounds: this occurs in many pieces, most notably in the choral symphony The Bells, the Second Piano Concerto, the E♭ major Étude-Tableaux (Op. 33, No. 7), and the B minor Prelude (Op. 32, No. 10). "It is not enough to say that the church bells of Novgorod, St Petersburg and Moscow influenced Rachmaninov and feature prominently in his music. This much is self-evident. What is extraordinary is the variety of bell sounds and breadth of structural and other functions they fulfill." He was also fond of Russian Orthodox chants. He used them most perceptibly in his Vespers, but many of his melodies found their origins in these chants. The opening melody of the First Symphony is derived from chants. (The opening melody of the Third Piano Concerto, on the other hand, is not derived from chants; when asked, Rachmaninoff said that "it had [written] itself".)

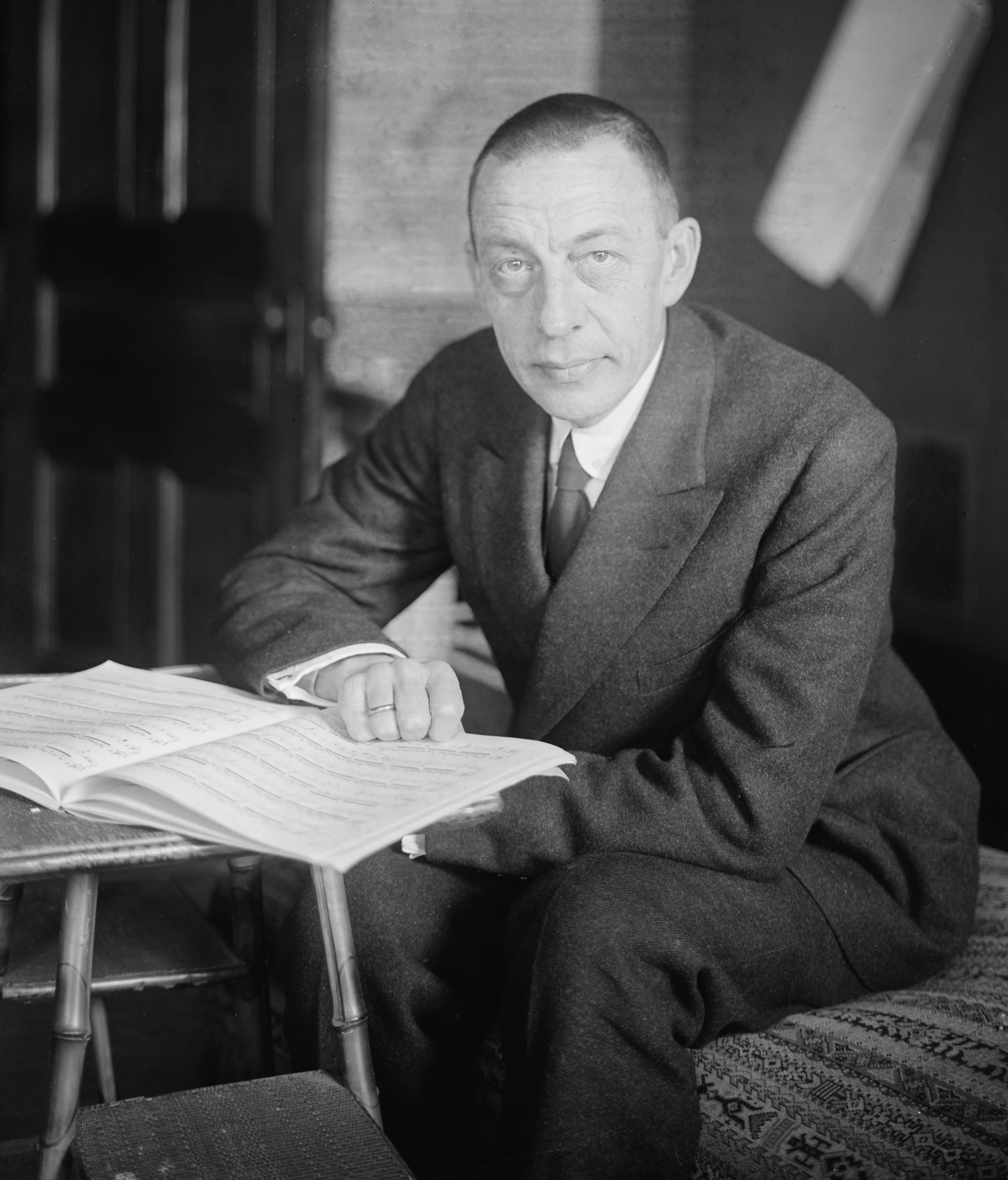
Rachmaninoff with a score

Rachmaninoff's frequently used motifs include the Dies irae, often just the fragments of the first phrase. Rachmaninoff had great command of counterpoint and fugal writing, thanks to his studies with Taneyev. The above-mentioned occurrence of the Dies irae in the Second Symphony (1907) is but a small example of this. Very characteristic of his writing is chromatic counterpoint. This talent was paired with a confidence in writing in both large- and small-scale forms. The Third Piano Concerto especially shows a structural ingenuity, while each of the preludes grows from a tiny melodic or rhythmic fragment into a taut, powerfully evocative miniature, crystallizing a particular mood or sentiment while employing a complexity of texture, rhythmic flexibility and a pungent chromatic harmony.

His compositional style had already begun changing before the October Revolution deprived him of his homeland. The harmonic writing in The Bells was composed in 1913 but not published until 1920. This may have been due to Rachmaninoff's main publisher, Gutheil, having died in 1914 and Gutheil's catalog being acquired by Serge Koussevitsky. The Bells became as advanced as in any of the works Rachmaninoff would write in Russia, partly because the melodic material has a harmonic aspect which arises from its chromatic ornamentation. Further changes are apparent in the revised First Piano Concerto, which he finished just before leaving Russia, as well as in the Op. 38 songs and Op. 39 Études-Tableaux. In both these sets Rachmaninoff was less concerned with pure melody than with coloring. His near-Impressionist style perfectly matched the texts by symbolist poets. The Op. 39 Études-Tableaux are among the most demanding pieces he wrote for any medium, both technically and in the sense that the player must see beyond any technical challenges to a considerable array of emotions, then unify all these aspects.

The composer's friend Vladimir Wilshaw noticed this compositional change continuing in the early 1930s, with a difference between the sometimes very extroverted Op. 39 Études-Tableaux (the composer had broken a string on the piano at one performance) and the Variations on a Theme of Corelli (Op. 42, 1931). The variations show an even greater textural clarity than in the Op. 38 songs, combined with a more abrasive use of chromatic harmony and a new rhythmic incisiveness. This would be characteristic of all his later works—the Piano Concerto No. 4 (Op. 40, 1926) is composed in a more emotionally introverted style, with a greater clarity of texture. Nevertheless, some of his most beautiful (nostalgic and melancholy) melodies occur in the Third Symphony, Rhapsody on a Theme of Paganini, and Symphonic Dances.

Music theorist and musicologist Joseph Yasser, as early as 1951, uncovered progressive tendencies in Rachmaninoff's compositions. He uncovered Rachmaninoff's use of an intra-tonal chromaticism that stands in notable contrast to the inter-tonal chromaticism of Richard Wagner and strikingly contrasts the extra-tonal chromaticism of the more radical twentieth century composers like Arnold Schoenberg. Yasser postulated that a variable, subtle, but unmistakable characteristic use of this intra-tonal chromaticism permeated Rachmaninoff's music.

== Pianist ==
Prelude in C♯ minor, Op. 3, No. 2
Playing his famous Prelude in C♯ minor. Composed when he was 19, the piece established his fame in America. Recorded in 1919.

Hungarian Rhapsody No. 2
Playing the first 4 minutes of Franz Liszt's Hungarian Rhapsody No. 2. Recorded in 1919 by Edison Records.

Waltz in E♭ major, Op. 18
Performing Frédéric Chopin's Waltz in E♭ major, Op. 18. Recorded on 21 January 1921.

Rachmaninoff ranked among the finest pianists of his time, along with Leopold Godowsky, Ignaz Friedman, Moriz Rosenthal, Josef Lhévinne, Ferruccio Busoni, and Josef Hofmann, and he was famed for possessing a clean and virtuosic technique. His playing was marked by precision, rhythmic drive, notable use of staccato and the ability to maintain clarity when playing works with complex textures. Rachmaninoff applied these qualities in music by Chopin, including the B♭ minor Piano Sonata. Rachmaninoff's repertoire, excepting his own works, consisted mainly of standard 19th century virtuoso works plus music by Bach, Beethoven, Borodin, Debussy, Grieg, Liszt, Mendelssohn, Mozart, Schubert, Schumann and Tchaikovsky.

The two pieces Rachmaninoff singled out for praise from Anton Rubinstein's concerts became cornerstones for his own recital programs. The compositions were Beethoven's Appassionata and Chopin's Funeral March Sonata. He may have based his interpretation of the Chopin sonata on that of Rubinstein. Rachmaninoff biographer Barrie Martyn points out similarities between written accounts of Rubinstein's interpretation and Rachmaninoff's audio recording of the work.

=== Technique ===
Rachmaninoff possessed large hands, with which he could easily maneuver through the most complex chordal configurations. His left hand technique was unusually powerful. His playing was marked by definition—where other pianists' playing became blurry-sounding from overuse of the pedal or deficiencies in finger technique, Rachmaninoff's textures were always crystal clear. Only Josef Hofmann and Josef Lhévinne shared this kind of clarity with him. All three men had Anton Rubinstein as a model for this kind of playing—Hofmann as a student of Rubinstein's, Rachmaninoff from hearing his famous series of historical recitals in Moscow while studying with Zverev, and Lhévinne from hearing and playing with him.

=== Tone ===
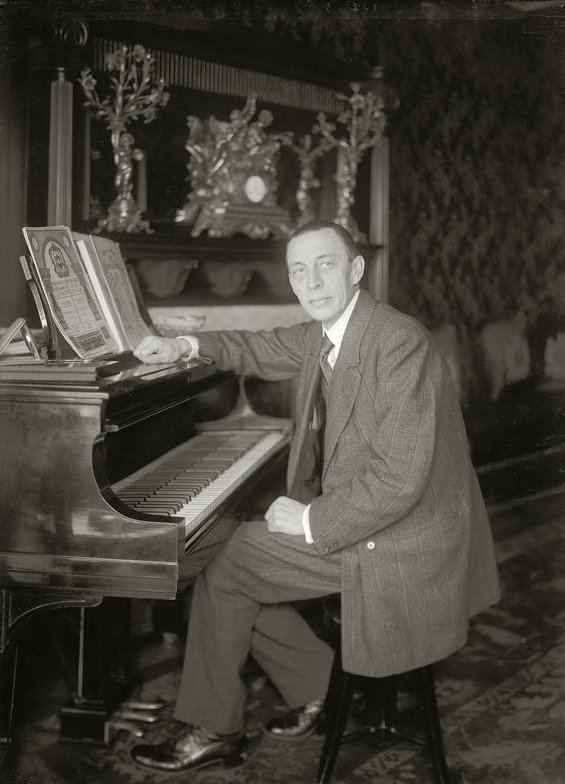
Rachmaninoff seated at a piano

Of Rachmaninoff's tone, Arthur Rubinstein wrote:

I was always under the spell of his glorious and inimitable tone which could make me forget my uneasiness about his too rapidly fleeting fingers and his exaggerated rubatos. There was always the irresistible sensuous charm, not unlike Kreisler's.

Coupled to this tone was a vocal quality not unlike that attributed to Chopin's playing. With Rachmaninoff's extensive operatic experience, he was a great admirer of fine singing. As his records demonstrate, he possessed a tremendous ability to make a musical line sing, no matter how long the notes or how complex the supporting texture, with most of his interpretations taking on a narrative quality. With the stories he told at the keyboard came multiple voices—a polyphonic dialogue, not the least in terms of dynamics. His 1940 recording of his transcription of the song "Daisies" captures this quality extremely well. On the recording, separate musical strands enter as if from various human voices in eloquent conversation. This ability came from an exceptional independence of fingers and hands.

=== Interpretations ===
Regardless of the music, Rachmaninoff always planned his performances carefully. He based his interpretations on the theory that each piece of music has a "culminating point". Regardless of where that point was or at which dynamic within that piece, the performer had to know how to approach it with absolute calculation and precision; otherwise, the whole construction of the piece could crumble and the piece could become disjointed. This was a practice he learned from Russian bass Feodor Chaliapin, a staunch friend. Paradoxically, Rachmaninoff often sounded like he was improvising, though he actually was not. While his interpretations were mosaics of tiny details, when those mosaics came together in performance, they might, according to the tempo of the piece being played, fly past at great speed, giving the impression of instant thought.

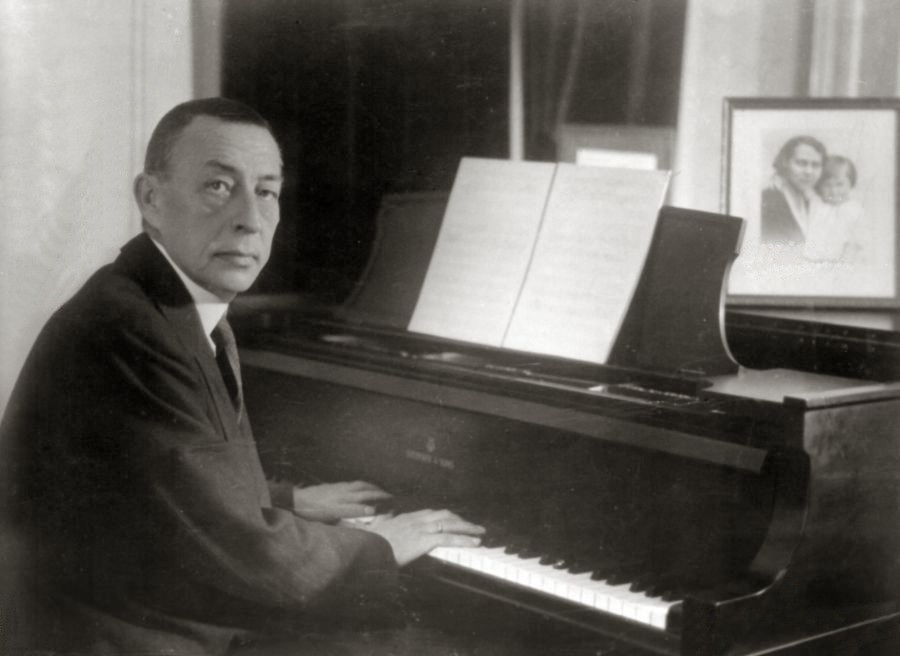
Rachmaninoff playing the Steinway grand piano at his home, 1936 or before

One advantage Rachmaninoff had in this building process over most of his contemporaries was in approaching the pieces he played from the perspective of a composer rather than that of an interpreter. He believed "interpretation demands something of the creative instinct. If you are a composer, you have an affinity with other composers. You can make contact with their imaginations, knowing something of their problems and their ideals. You can give their works color. That is the most important thing for me in my interpretations, color. So you make music live. Without color it is dead." Nevertheless, Rachmaninoff also possessed a far better sense of structure than many of his contemporaries, such as Hofmann, or the majority of pianists from the previous generation, judging from their respective recordings.

A recording that showcases Rachmaninoff's approach is Liszt's Second Polonaise, recorded in 1925. Percy Grainger, who had been influenced by the composer and Liszt specialist Ferruccio Busoni, had himself recorded the same piece a few years earlier. Rachmaninoff's performance is far more taut and concentrated than Grainger's. The Russian's drive and monumental conception bear a considerable difference to the Australian's more delicate perceptions. Grainger's textures are elaborate. Rachmaninoff shows the filigree as essential to the work's structure, not simply decorative.

=== Hand size and medical speculations ===
Along with his musical gifts, Rachmaninoff possessed physical gifts that placed him in good stead as a pianist, including large hands with a gigantic finger stretch. Cyril Smith noted that Rachmaninoff could play a twelfth with the left hand playing C, Eb, G, C and G, and his right hand could play the notes C (index), E (3rd finger), G, C, and E (thumb).

His hand size, in addition to his considerable height, slender frame, long limbs, narrow head, prominent ears, and thin nose has led to the suggestion that he had Marfan syndrome, a hereditary disorder of the connective tissue. This syndrome would have accounted for several minor ailments he suffered all his life, including back pain, arthritis, eye strain, and bruising of the fingertips. An article in the Journal of the Royal Society of Medicine, however, pointed out that Rachmaninoff did not show many of the typical signs of Marfan syndrome, and instead suggested that he had acromegaly, which, the article speculated, would possibly have accounted for stiffness Rachmaninoff experienced in his hands, and for the repeated periods of depression he experienced throughout his life, and could have possibly even been connected to his melanoma.

=== Recordings ===
External audio
- Rachmaninoff performing Chopin's Piano Sonata No. 2

Upon arriving in America, Rachmaninoff's poor financial situation prompted him in 1919 to record a selection of piano pieces for Edison Records on their "Diamond Disc" records, in a limited contract for ten released sides. Rachmaninoff felt his performances varied in quality and requested final approval prior to a commercial release. Edison agreed, but still issued multiple takes, an unusual practice which was standard at Edison Records. Rachmaninoff and Edison Records were pleased with the released discs and wished to record more, but Edison refused, saying the ten sides were sufficient. This, in addition to technical issues in the recordings and Edison's lack of musical taste, led to Rachmaninoff's annoyance with the company, and as soon as his contract ended he left Edison Records.

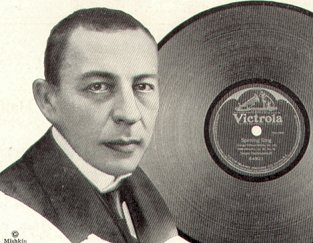
A Victor advertisement from March 1921 featuring Rachmaninoff

In 1920, Rachmaninoff signed a contract with the Victor Talking Machine Company (later RCA Victor). Unlike Edison, the company was pleased to comply with his requests, and proudly advertised Rachmaninoff as one of their prominent recording artists. He continued to record for Victor until 1942, when the American Federation of Musicians imposed a recording ban on their members in a strike over royalty payments. Rachmaninoff died in March 1943, over a year and a half before RCA Victor settled with the union and resumed commercial recording activity.

When Rachmaninoff recorded his works, he would seek perfection, often re-recording them until he was satisfied. Particularly renowned are his renditions of Schumann's Carnaval and Chopin's Piano Sonata No. 2, along with many shorter pieces. He recorded all four of his piano concertos with the Philadelphia Orchestra; the first, third, and fourth concertos were recorded with Eugene Ormandy in 1939–41, and two versions of the second concerto with Leopold Stokowski in 1924 and 1929. He also made a recording of the Rhapsody on a Theme of Paganini, soon after its first performance (1934) with the Philadelphians under Stokowski, in addition to three recordings he made as conductor with the Philadelphia Orchestra, playing his own Third Symphony, his symphonic poem Isle of the Dead, and his orchestration of Vocalise. (Note: The entire collection of Rachmaninoff's recordings were reissued in 1992 by RCA Victor in a 10-CD set entitled "Sergei Rachmaninoff – The Complete Recordings" (RCA Victor Gold Seal 09026-61265-2).)

Rachmaninoff also recorded a number of piano rolls on the reproducing piano of the American Piano Company (Ampico), producing a total of 35 piano rolls from 1919 to 1929, 12 of which were of his own compositions. He began recording rolls for Ampico in March 1919, upon the suggestion of his friend Fritz Kreisler, and continued doing so, on and off, until around February 1929, though his last roll, of Chopin's Scherzo No. 2, was not published until October 1933. Of the works he produced piano rolls for, he also made gramophone recordings of 29, and these provide evidence for Rachmaninoff's consistency of interpretation. In addition, there also survives an unpublished piano roll of the second movement of his Second Piano Concerto, which may be indicative of Rachmaninoff having made other rolls.

== Conductor ==
Apart from several performances, including two of his opera Aleko in 1893, Rachmaninoff first began conducting in 1897, and performed as a conductor every year until 1914. After leaving Russia permanently in 1917, Rachmaninoff prioritised performing as a pianist to conducting, giving only seven more recitals as a conductor until the end of his life.

Rachmaninoff was noted for his restraint in conducting, and for the "simple and unpolished" manner in which he gestured to the orchestra. According to Aleksandr Goldenweiser, his performances as a conductor were much stricter and less rhythmically free than his performances on the piano. In Nikolai Medtner's estimation, he was "the greatest Russian conductor".

In addition to his own works, Rachmaninoff conducted repertoire primarily from fellow Russian composers, such as Borodin, Glazunov, Glinka, Lyadov, Mussorgsky, Rimsky-Korsakov and Tchaikovsky, as well as other composers such as Grieg and Liszt. Outside of Russia, Rachmaninoff conducted almost exclusively his own works.

== Reputation and legacy ==
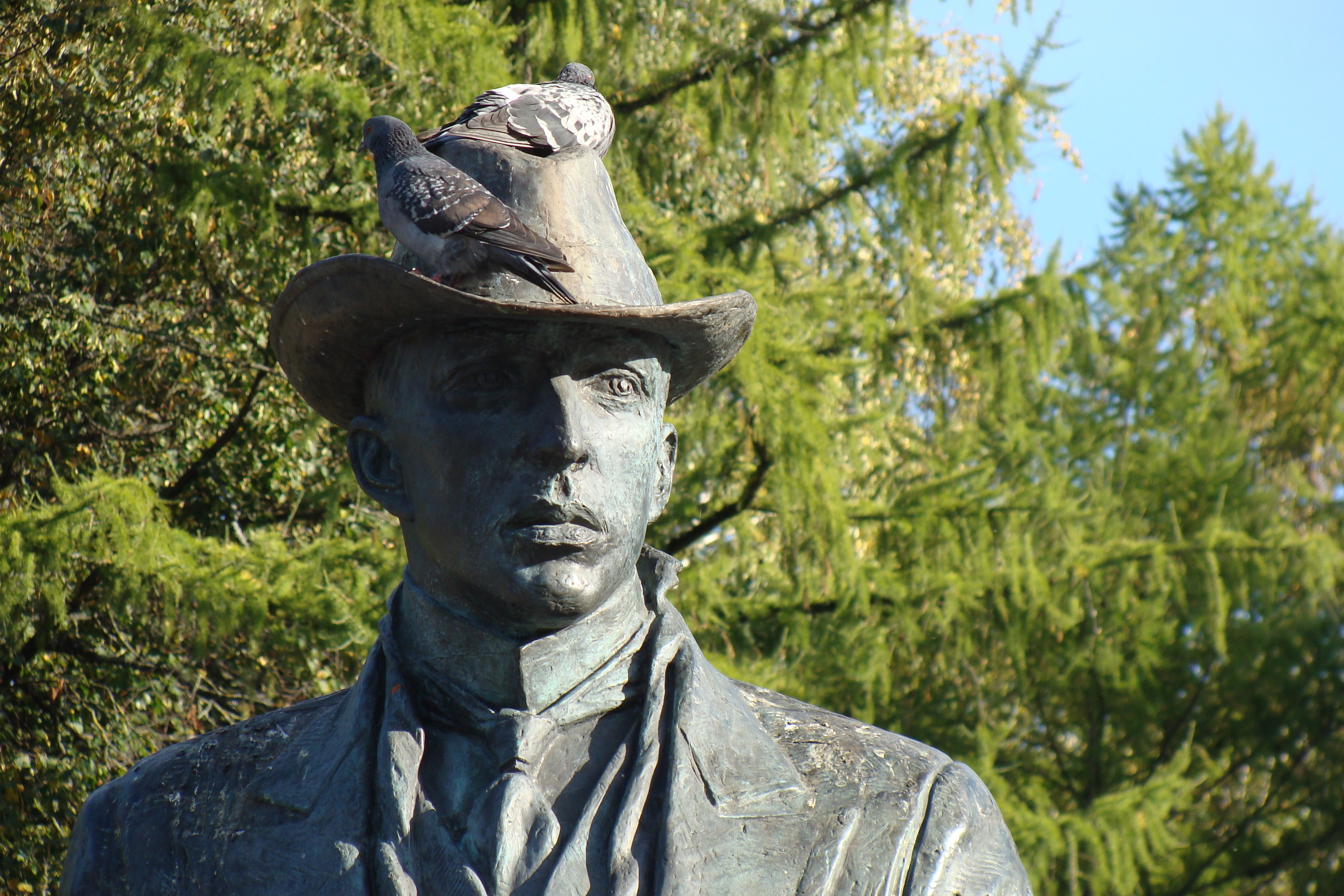
Head of a statue by Alexandr Rukavishnikov in Veliky Novgorod

Rachmaninoff's reputation as a composer generated a variety of opinions before his music gained steady recognition around the world. The 1954 edition of the Grove Dictionary of Music and Musicians notoriously dismissed Rachmaninoff's music as "monotonous in texture ... consist[ing] mainly of artificial and gushing tunes" and predicted that his popular success was "not likely to last". To this, Harold C. Schonberg, in his Lives of the Great Composers, responded: "It is one of the most outrageously snobbish and even stupid statements ever to be found in a work that is supposed to be an objective reference."

The Conservatoire Rachmaninoff in Paris, as well as streets in Veliky Novgorod (which is close to his birthplace) and Tambov, are named after the composer.

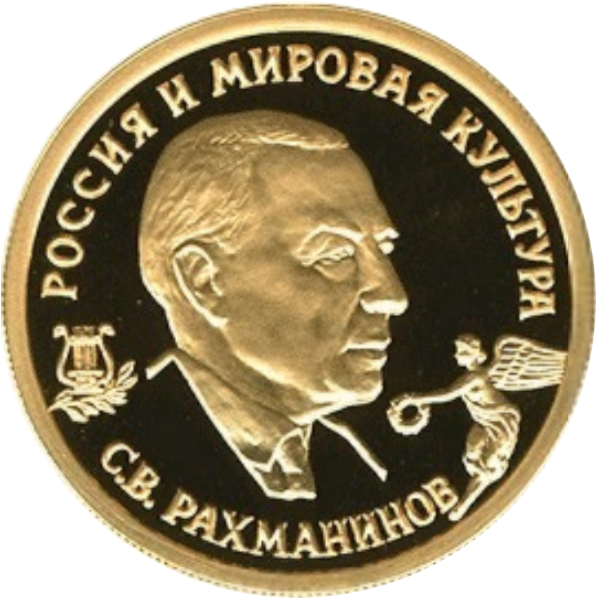
Russian memorial coin

In 1986, the Moscow Conservatory dedicated a concert hall on its premises to Rachmaninoff, designating the 252-seat auditorium Rachmaninoff Hall, and in 1999 the "Monument to Sergei Rachmaninoff" was installed in Moscow. A separate monument to Rachmaninoff was unveiled in Veliky Novgorod, near his birthplace, on 14 June 2009. The 2015 musical Preludes by Dave Malloy depicts Rachmaninoff's struggle with depression and writer's block. A statue, Rachmaninoff: The Last Concert, designed and sculpted by Victor Bokarev, stands at the World's Fair Park in Knoxville, Tennessee, as a tribute to the composer. In Alexandria, Virginia in 2019, a Rachmaninoff concert performed by the Alexandria Symphony Orchestra played to wide acclaim. Attendees were treated to a talk prior to the performance by Rachmaninoff's great-granddaughter, Natalie Wanamaker Javier, who joined Rachmaninoff scholar Francis Crociata and Library of Congress music specialist Kate Rivers on a panel of discussants about the composer and his contributions.
