= Études-Tableaux, Op. 39 =

Set of piano pieces by Sergei Rachmaninoff

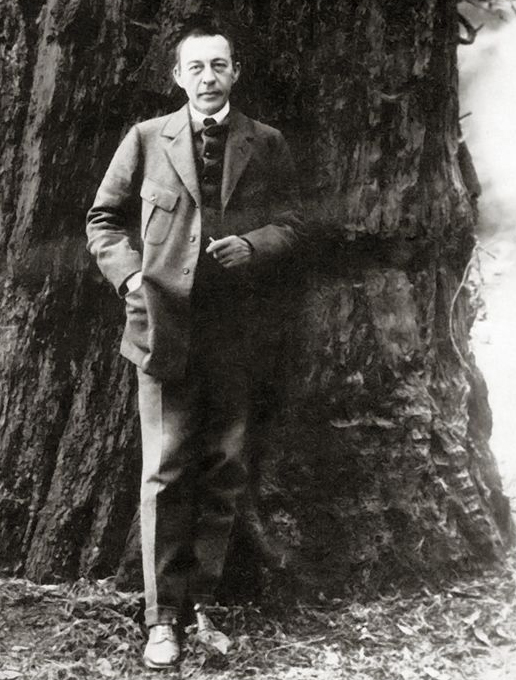
Rachmaninoff in front of a giant Redwood tree in California, 1919

The Études-Tableaux ("study paintings"), Op. 39, is the second of two sets of piano études composed by Sergei Rachmaninoff. Op. 39 was composed sometime between 1916 and 1917 and were among the final works composed by Rachmaninoff before his exit from Russia.

== Structure ==
The Op. 39 set comprises nine études:

1. Allegro agitato in C minor ("The Sea"), a study in arpeggiated "swirls"
2. Lento assai in A minor ("The Sea and the Seagulls")
3. Allegro molto in F♯ minor ("The Day of Wrath"), a study targeting the weak fingers of the hand
4. Allegro assai in B minor ("Dying Birds") a fusion of a Hopak and a Gavotte which functions as a study on repeated notes
5. Appassionato in E♭ minor, a study in octaves
6. Allegro in A minor ("Little Red Riding Hood and the Wolf"), a study in repeated notes and jumps
7. Lento lugubre in C minor ("Funeral March"), based on the painting Self-Immolation by Grigoriy Myasoyedov, a study in thick chords and luminous bell sounds
8. Allegro moderato in D minor, based on the painting A Road in the Rye by Grigoriy Myasoyedov, a lyrical study in double notes which quotes Scriabin's Piano Sonata No. 5 near the end
9. Allegro moderato. Tempo di marcia in D major, a study in jumps, octaves and repeated notes

== Recordings ==
- Rachmaninoff recorded Op. 39, No. 4 (piano roll only), and Op. 39, No. 6 (electrical recording and piano roll).
- Evgeny Kissin recorded Nos. 1–2, 4–6, and 9 on the RCA Victor Red Seal label, May 16 and 17, 1988, in Watford Town Hall. The recording also includes the Piano Concerto No. 2, Opus 18, with the London Symphony Orchestra and Valery Gergiev conducting.
- Another recording of the Op. 39 Études-Tableaux is by Alexander Melnikov on the Harmonia Mundi label. Other works are the Op. 38 songs and the Variations on a Theme of Corelli.
- The Op. 39 has also been recorded by several other pianists, including Nicholas Angelich, Vladimir Ashkenazy, and John Ogdon.

== See also ==
- Études-Tableaux, Op. 33
- Piano Concerto No. 2 (Rachmaninoff)

== Sources ==
- Norris, Geoffrey, Rachmaninoff (New York: Schirmer Books, 1976, 1983). ISBN 0-02-870685-4.
