= Études-Tableaux, Op. 33 =

1911 set of piano études by Sergei Rachmaninoff

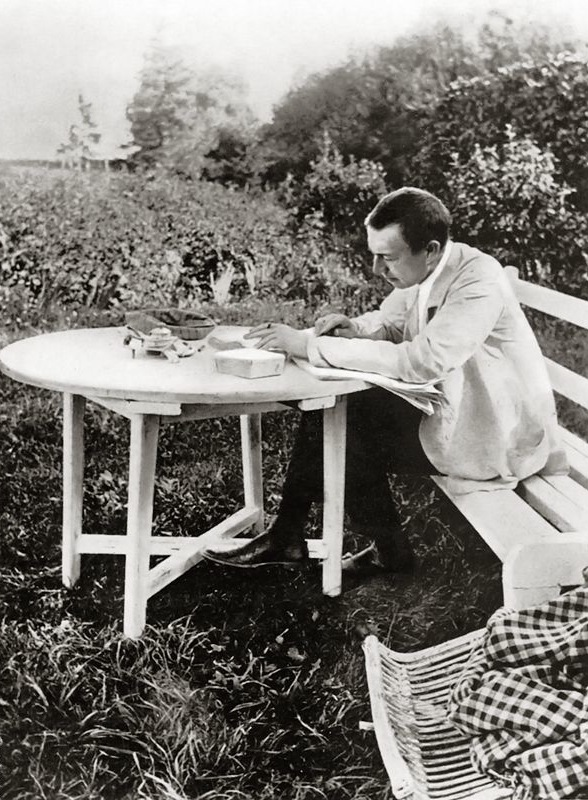
Rachmaninoff at the Ivanovka estate, 1910

The Études-Tableaux ("study pictures"), Op. 33, is the first of two sets of piano études composed by Sergei Rachmaninoff (the other being his opus 39). They were intended to be "picture pieces", essentially "musical evocations of external visual stimuli". But Rachmaninoff did not disclose what inspired each one, stating: "I do not believe in the artist that discloses too much of his images. Let [the listener] paint for themselves what it most suggests." However, he willingly shared sources for a few of these études with the Italian composer Ottorino Respighi when Respighi orchestrated them in 1930.

== History ==
Étude-Tableau No. 5 in E♭ minor
Oksana Yevsyukova performing (1:50)

Étude-Tableau No. 6 in E♭ major
Oksana Yevsyukova performing (1:50)

Rachmaninoff composed the Op. 33 Études-Tableaux at his Ivanovka estate in Tambov, Russia between August and September 1911, the year after completing his second set of preludes, Op. 32.

Rachmaninoff biographer Max Harrison calls the Études-Tableaux "studies in [musical] composition"; while they explore a variety of themes, they "investigate the transformation of rather specific climates of feeling via piano textures and sonorities. They are thus less predictable than the preludes and compositionally mark an advance" in technique.

Rachmaninoff initially wrote nine pieces for Op. 33 but published only six in 1914. One étude, in A minor, was subsequently revised and used in the Op. 39 set; the other two appeared posthumously and are now usually played with the other six. Performing these eight études together could be considered to run against the composer's intent, as the six originally published are unified through "melodic-cellular connections" in much the same way as in Robert Schumann's Symphonic Studies.

Differing from the simplicity of the first four études, Nos. 5–8 are more virtuosic in their approach to keyboard writing, calling for unconventional hand positions, wide leaps for the fingers and considerable technical strength from the performer. Also, "the individual mood and passionate character of each piece" pose musical problems that preclude performance by those lacking strong physical technique.

== Numbering and character ==
Rachmaninoff wrote nine études-tableaux at his Ivanovka estate in 1911. Six of them, the original Nos. 1–2 and 6–9, were published that year. The original No. 4 is lost; the piece was revised and published as Op. 39, No. 6. The original Nos. 3 and 5 were published posthumously within Op. 33. Probably best identified by their tempo markings and keys, the 1911 pieces are numbered by the International Music Score Library Project (IMSLP) as follows, leaving aside the piece that is now part of Op. 39:

1. Allegro non troppo in F minor

This study has a martial character. Rachmaninov admired the music of Frédéric Chopin, and there are often parallels between the music of the two composers. This study recalls the Étude Op. 25, No. 4 of Chopin.

2. Allegro in C major - "Misting Rain"

This study is characterized by a marked lyricism and a very expressive melody. Notice the similarity to Rachmaninoff's Prelude op. 32 no. 12, which was composed the year before, in 1910.

3. Grave in C minor (published posthumously)

This study was re-used in the Largo of Rachmaninov's Fourth Concerto, which was completed in 1926.

4. Moderato in D minor (published posthumously, originally No. 5)

This study is similar to the Prelude op. 23 No. 3 composed by Rachmaninoff in 1903, both in tone and character. It is a simple march that grows into a thing of striking contrapuntal complexity.

5. Non allegro—Presto in E♭ minor - "The Snowstorm" (published as No. 3, originally No. 6)

This study ranks among the most difficult of the opus, to play. The right hand runs constantly throughout the whole keyboard with numerous octave leaps and chromatic scales. Note some similarity to the Prelude op. 28 No. 16 and the Study Op. 25 No. 6 by Chopin. In Russia, this piece is nicknamed The Snow Storm.

6. Allegro con fuoco in E♭ major- "The Fair" (published as No. 4, originally No. 7)

This study has primarily a military aspect. The study concludes with a particularly virtuosic coda. Its joyous, exuberant character earned it the nickname, according to Rachmaninoff in his correspondence with Ottorino Respighi.

Études-Tableaux No. 7, Moderato in G minor (4:22)
Performed in June 2013 by Olga Borowski (4:22)

7. Moderato in G minor - "A Gloomy Morning" (published as No. 5, originally No. 8)

This study parallels the finale of the First Ballade in G minor by Chopin.

8. Grave in C♯ minor (published as No. 6, originally No. 9)

This study is a thundering piece with violent wavering between minor and major, as well as a bravura display at the end featuring harmonic dips and turns, chromatic runs, huge left-hand leaps, and a countermelody that emerges apparently out of nowhere. This study was one of the three in this opus that were recorded in the Melodiya studios by Sviatoslav Richter, the other two being Moderato in D minor and Non allegro—Presto in E♭ minor.

== Arrangements ==
In 1929, conductor and music publisher Serge Koussevitzky asked whether Rachmaninoff would select a group of études-tableaux for Italian composer Ottorino Respighi to orchestrate. The commissioned orchestrations would be published by Koussevitzky's firm and Koussevitzky would conduct their premiere with the Boston Symphony Orchestra. Rachmaninoff agreed and selected five études from Op. 33 and Op. 39. Respighi rearranged the order of études, but was otherwise faithful to the composer's intent. He gave each étude a distinct title from the programmatic clues Rachmaninoff had given him:

1. La foire (The Fair) – (Op. 33, No. 6(7))
2. La mer et les mouettes (The Sea and the Seagulls) – (Op. 39, No. 2)
3. La chaperon rouge et le loup (Little Red Riding Hood and the Wolf) – (Op. 39, No. 6)
4. Marche funèbre (Funeral March) – (Op. 39, No. 7)
5. Marche (March) – (Op. 39, No. 9)

== Recordings ==
- Complete Études-Tableaux by Michael Ponti, İdil Biret (1997), Rustem Hayroudinoff (2007), Nikolai Lugansky (1992), Bruno Vlahek (2020), Nicholas Angelich, John Ogdon, and Vladimir Ashkenazy
- There is a popular recording that includes the originally excised numbers of Op. 33, by Vladimir Ovchinnikov on the EMI Classics label.
- BBC Radio 3 chose the recording by Rustem Hayroudinoff (Chandos Records) as the finest version of the Complete Études-Tableaux, in its programme Building a Library.
- Jesús López-Cobos and the Cincinnati Symphony Orchestra recorded the Respighi orchestrations for the Telarc label.
- Rachmaninoff himself recorded Op. 33, Nos. 2 and 7 (6) (electrical recording).
