= Villa Senar =

Estate in Switzerland

Coordinates: 47.0312°N 8.3978°E

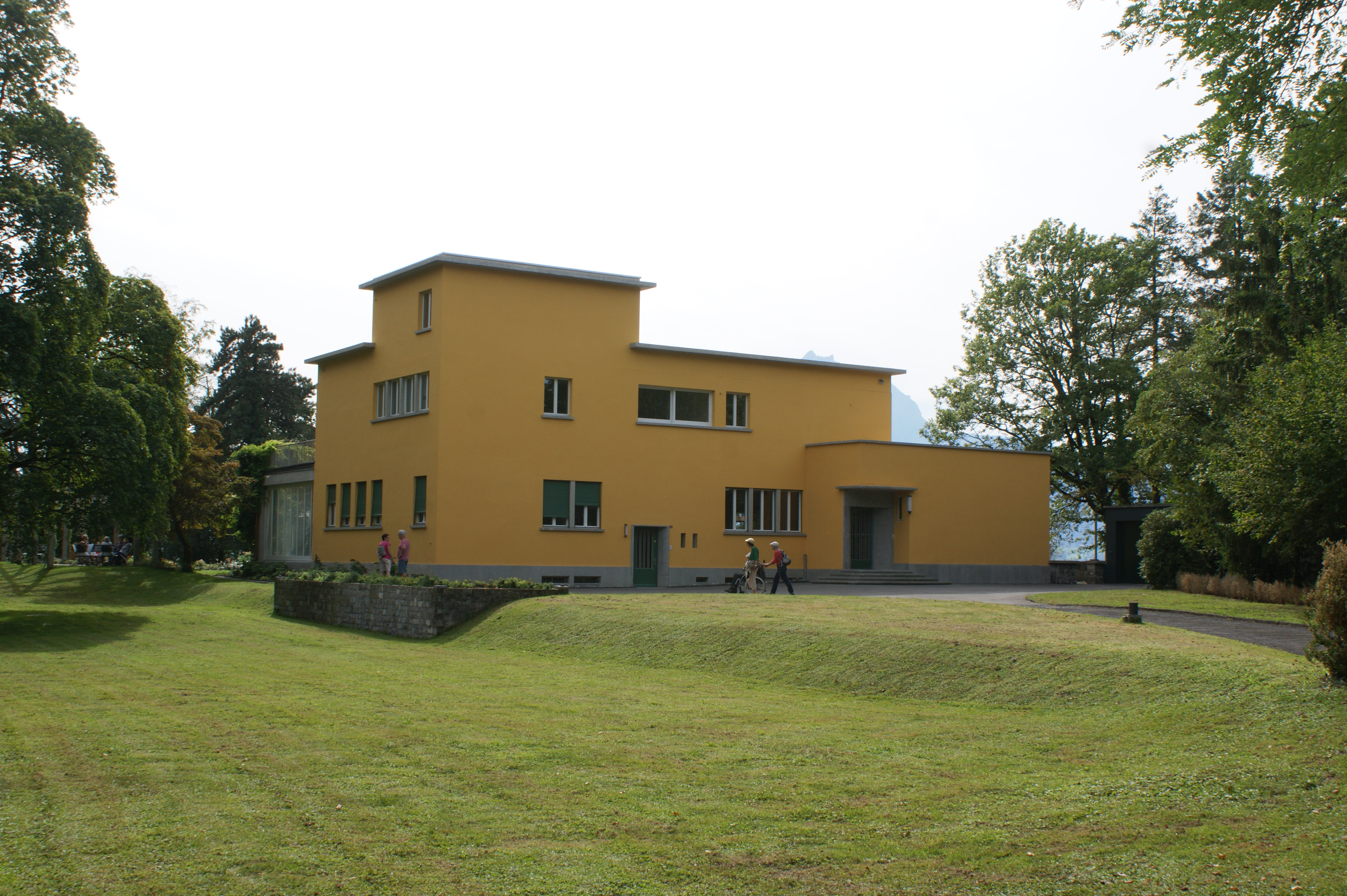
A view of the Villa Senar

Villa Senar is an estate built in Switzerland by the Russian composer Sergei Rachmaninoff. He purchased the plot of land near Hertenstein on the shores of Lake Lucerne in 1932. The name of the estate originated from the names of Rachmaninoff and his wife: Sergei and Natalia, by combining the first two letters of each given name and the first of their surname. The architects of the very modern design were the Swiss architects Alfred Möri and Karl Friedrich Krebs.

The villa was designed to remind Rachmaninoff of the estate of Ivanovka the family had in southern Russia before the October Revolution and their migration to Western Europe in 1918. A park and a magnificent rose garden were laid at Senar. The Rachmaninoffs spent every summer at Senar until their final migration to the United States in 1939 at the outbreak of World War II. Two of Rachmaninoff's major compositions were written at Senar: Rhapsody on a Theme of Paganini completed in 1934 and the Third symphony completed in 1936. The villa hosted famous Russian immigrants, including Ivan Bunin and Vladimir Horowitz.

Rachmaninoff left Senar for the last time on 16 August 1939, going to Paris and preparing to move to New York City. In 2013, it was reported that Russia was interested in purchasing the Villa and preserve it in memory of Rachmaninoff.

After the death of Rachmaninoff, the villa stayed in possession of the family. His grand child Alexandre Rachmaninoff Conus established the Rachmaninoff foundation. After the death of Rachmaninoff Conus, his will mentioned Lucerne as a possible inheritor, but it was not worded clearly. In order to prevent a possible legal case between Lucerne and Rachmaninoff's descendants, the Canton Lucerne bought the estate in 2022, and on the 1 April 2023, the 150th birthday of Rachmaninoff, the Villa was made accessible to the public.
