= Isle of the Dead (Rachmaninoff) =

Symphonic poem by Sergei Rachmaninoff

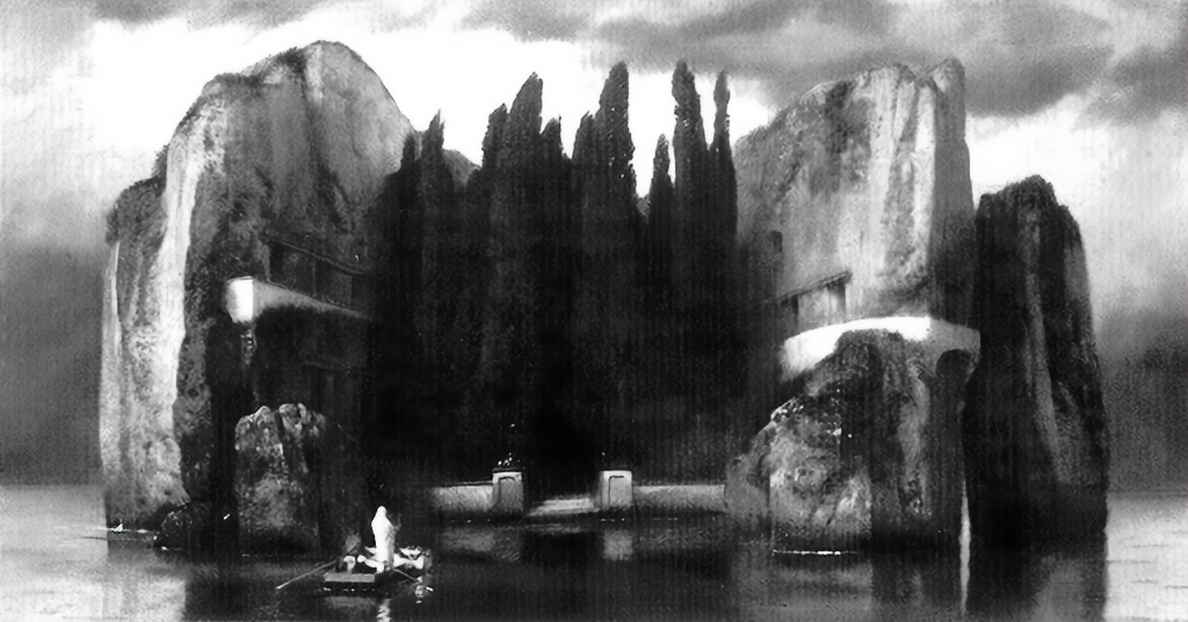
A black and white reproduction of Isle of the Dead by Arnold Böcklin was the inspiration for the piece.

Isle of the Dead (Russian: Остров мёртвых), Op. 29, is a symphonic poem composed by Sergei Rachmaninoff, written in the key of A minor. The piece was inspired by a black and white reproduction of Arnold Böcklin's painting Isle of the Dead, which he saw in Paris in 1907. He composed the work from January to March of 1909, but later made numerous revisions, including cuts.

== History ==
For two years, Rachmaninoff looked for inspiration for a symphonic poem, and in November 1906, he wrote to his friend Nikita Morozov, seeking ideas for a subject for such a work, but was uninspired by his suggestions. Then, in Paris in May 1907, he saw a black and white reproduction of Arnold Böcklin's painting Isle of the Dead, and, inspired by the painting, he used it as the basis for his symphonic poem, on the suggestion of his friend Nikolai Struve. He composed the piece from January to March of 1909, with the work's manuscript dated to 17 April, the day before it received its premiere in Moscow, under the composer's baton. Rachmaninoff was disappointed by the original painting when he later saw it, saying, "If I had seen first the original, I, probably, would have not written my Isle of the Dead. I like it in black and white."

Rachmaninoff made numerous later revisions to the Isle of the Dead after writing the piece. He made several alterations to the score before its printing in June 1909, writing to Morozov that "I have made a great many corrections" and that "it does seem to me that now this composition is improved and will sound better". Before recording the piece in April 1929, Rachmaninoff made significant cuts to the work, removing 62 bars in total, and in January 1930 wrote to the publishing director Gavriil Paichadze that he wanted to implement several further cuts and revisions in a new revision of the work.

== Instrumentation ==
It is scored for 3 flutes (3rd doubling piccolo), 2 oboes, English horn, 2 clarinets, bass clarinet, 2 bassoons, contrabassoon, 6 horns, 3 trumpets, 3 trombones, tuba, timpani, cymbals, bass drum, harp, and strings.

== Structure ==
The music begins by suggesting the sound of the oars as they meet the waters on the way to the Isle of the Dead. The slowly heaving and sinking music could also be interpreted as waves. Rachmaninoff uses a recurring figure in 5/8 time to depict what may be the rowing of the oarsman or the movement of the water, and as in several other of his works, quotes the Dies Irae plainchant, an allusion to death. In contrast to the theme of death, the 5/8 (quintuple) time also depicts breathing, creating a holistic reflection on how life and death are intertwined.

== Recording ==
In 1929, Rachmaninoff conducted the Philadelphia Orchestra in a recording of the music for the Victor Talking Machine Company, which was purchased by RCA that same year and became known as RCA Victor. This recording was made in the Academy of Music in Philadelphia, using one microphone, and was later reissued on LP and CD by RCA Victor.
