= Semyonovo =

Semyonovo Семёново
- Village
- Location within Bashkortostan Location within Russia
- Coordinates: 53°03′N 58°13′E
- Country: Russia
- Region: Bashkortostan
- District: Baymaksky District
- Time zone: UTC+5:00

Semyonovo (Russian: Семёново; Bashkir: Һәмән, Hämän) is a rural locality (a village) in Bilyalovsky Selsoviet, Baymaksky District, Bashkortostan, Russia. The population was 329 as of 2010. There are 5 streets.

== Geography ==
Semyonovo is located 69 km north of Baymak (the district's administrative centre) by road. Bilyalovo is the nearest rural locality.
