= Rhapsody on a Theme of Paganini =

1934 concertante by Sergei Rachmaninoff

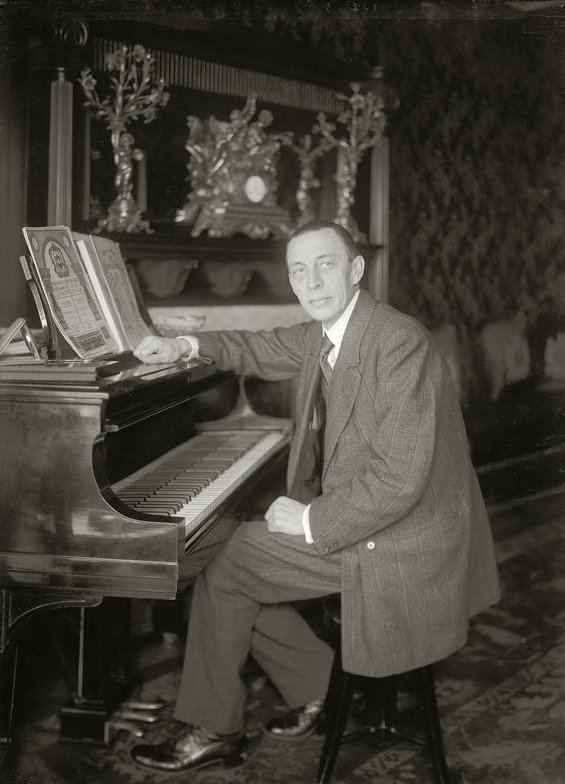
Rachmaninoff ca. 1933

The Rhapsody on a Theme of Paganini, Op. 43, (Russian: Рапсодия на тему Паганини, Rapsodiya na temu Paganini) is a concertante work written by Sergei Rachmaninoff for piano and orchestra, closely resembling a piano concerto, all in a single movement. Rachmaninoff wrote the work at his summer home, the Villa Senar in Switzerland, according to the score, from 3 July to 18 August 1934. Rachmaninoff himself played the piano part at the piece's premiere on 7 November 1934, at the Lyric Opera House in Baltimore, Maryland, with the Philadelphia Orchestra conducted by Leopold Stokowski.

Rachmaninoff, Stokowski, and the Philadelphia Orchestra made the first recording, on 24 December 1934, at RCA Victor's Trinity Church Studio in Camden, New Jersey. The English premiere on 7 March 1935 at Manchester Free Trade Hall also featured Rachmaninoff with The Hallé conducted by Nicolai Malko. The best-known variation in the piece is the 18th variation, frequently selected in isolation in classical music compilations.

== Instrumentation ==
The piece is scored for piano and orchestra:

Woodwinds

2 flutes
piccolo
2 oboes
cor anglais
2 clarinets in B♭
2 bassoons

Brass

4 horns in F
2 trumpets in C
3 trombones
tuba

Percussion

timpani

snare drum
triangle
cymbals
bass drum
glockenspiel

Strings

1st violins
2nd violins
violas
cellos
double basses
concert harp

== Structure ==
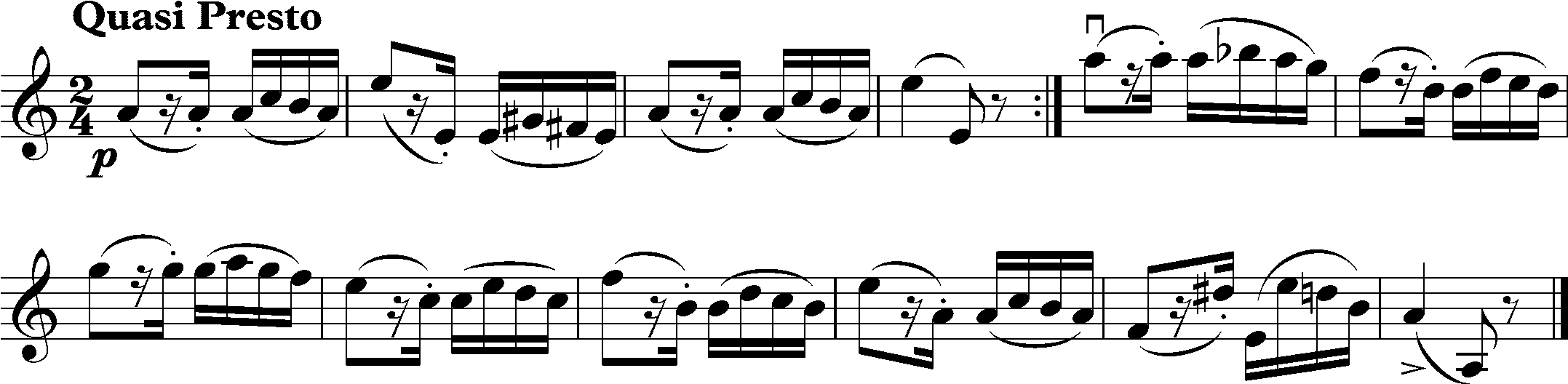
Paganini's theme

The piece is a set of 24 variations on the twenty-fourth and last of Niccolò Paganini's Caprices for solo violin, which has inspired works by several composers. The whole composition takes about 22–24 minutes to perform. All variations are in A minor except where noted.

- Section 1:
  - Introduction: Allegro vivace
  - Variation 1: (Precedente)
  - Theme: L'istesso tempo
  - Variation 2: L'istesso tempo
  - Variation 3: L'istesso tempo
  - Variation 4: Più vivo
  - Variation 5: Tempo precedente
  - Variation 6: L'istesso tempo
  - Variation 7: Meno mosso, a tempo moderato
  - Variation 8: Tempo I
  - Variation 9: L'istesso tempo
  - Variation 10: L'istesso tempo
- Section 2:
  - Variation 11: Moderato
  - Variation 12: Tempo di minuetto (D minor)
  - Variation 13: Allegro (D minor)
  - Variation 14: L'istesso tempo (F major)
  - Variation 15: Più vivo scherzando (F major)
  - Variation 16: Allegretto (B♭ minor)
  - Variation 17: (Allegretto) (B♭ minor)
  - Variation 18: Andante cantabile (D♭ major)
- Section 3:
  - Variation 19: A tempo vivace
  - Variation 20: Un poco più vivo
  - Variation 21: Un poco più vivo
  - Variation 22: Marziale. Un poco più vivo (Alla breve)
  - Variation 23: L'istesso tempo
  - Variation 24: A tempo un poco meno mosso (A minor → A major)

Although Rachmaninoff's work is performed in one stretch without breaks, it can be divided into three sections, as shown above. These correspond to the three movements of a concerto: up to variation 10 corresponds to the first movement, variations 11 to 18 are the equivalent of a slow movement, and the remaining variations make a finale.

== Analysis ==
After a brief introduction, the first variation is played before the theme. Paganini's theme is stated on strings with the piano picking out salient notes, after the first variation. Rachmaninoff likely got the idea of having a variation before the theme from the finale of Beethoven's Eroica symphony. Variations II to VI recombine elements of the theme. The pauses and rhetorical flourishes for the piano in variation VI herald a change of tempo and tone. The piano next gravely intones the Dies irae (of which, to some degree, the Paganini theme is an inversion), the "day of wrath" plainchant from the medieval Mass of the Dead, while the orchestra accompanies with a slower version of the opening motif of the Paganini theme. The piece is one of several by Rachmaninoff to quote the Dies irae plainchant melody.

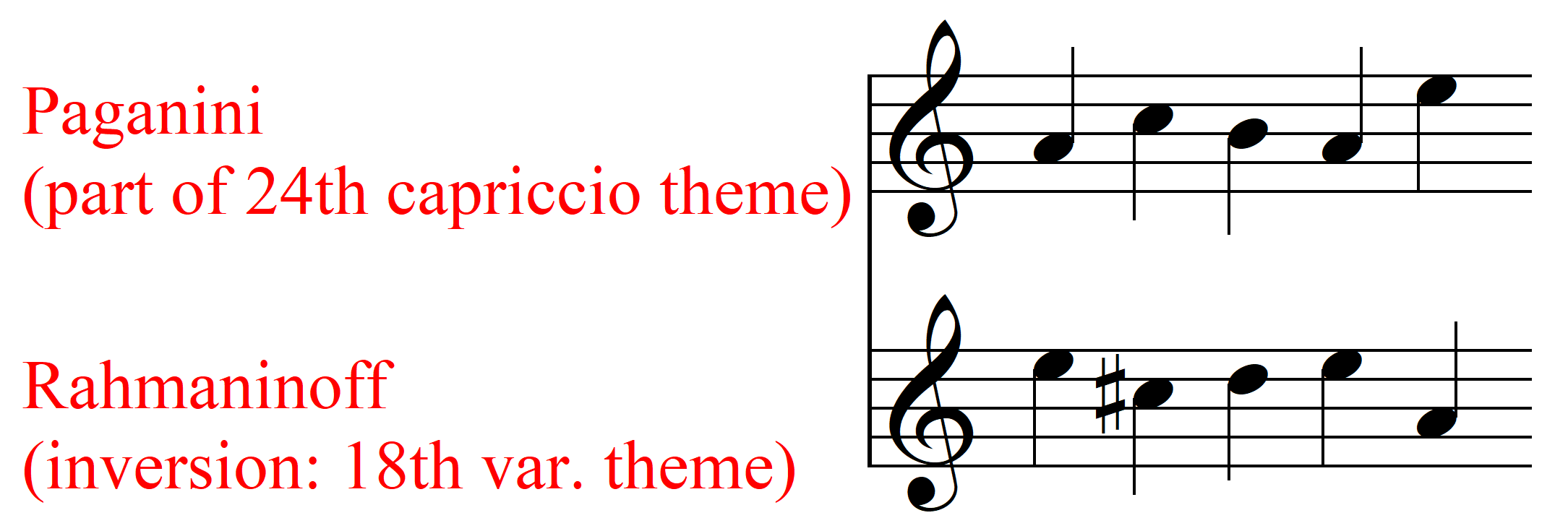
Inversion of the melody

The slow 18th variation is by far the best known, and it is often included on classical music compilations without the rest of the work. It is based on an inversion of the melody of Paganini's theme. In other words, the A minor Paganini theme is literally played "upside down" in D♭ major, with a few other changes. Rachmaninoff himself recognized the appeal of this variation, saying "This one is for my agent."

The 24th variation is more playful in tone than most of the other variations, ending with a glissando sweep of the keyboard, before quoting the original theme in the last bar. Due to the speed and the large leaps on the piano, the 24th and last variation of the rhapsody presents considerable technical difficulty for the pianist. Shortly before the world première performance, Rachmaninoff – a sufferer of performance anxiety – confessed trepidation over his ability to play it. Upon the suggestion of his friend Benno Moiseiwitsch, Rachmaninoff broke his usual rule against drinking alcohol and had a glass of crème de menthe, which he reputedly kept beneath the piano, to steady his nerves. His performance was a spectacular success, and prior to every subsequent performance of the Rhapsody, he drank crème de menthe. This led to Rachmaninoff nicknaming the twenty-fourth the "Crème de Menthe Variation".

== Balletic interpretations ==
In 1939, Michel Fokine wrote to Rachmaninoff from Auckland, New Zealand, where he was touring, seeking the composer's approval to use Rhapsody on a Theme of Paganini for his ballet Paganini, which he had almost finished choreographing. Fokine wanted to make a minor change to the score, involving the reuse of 12 earlier measures as a more theatrically effective introduction to the 18th Variation, which he wanted to play in the key of A major, rather than D♭ major. Rachmaninoff agreed to the extra measures, although he said A major would not work and asked that the 18th Variation be played in D major, to provide greater tension. He also wondered why Niccolò Paganini had been turned into a guitar player in Fokine's scenario, but did not object. Paganini was premiered in 1939 by The Royal Ballet at the Royal Opera House in Covent Garden, London. The ballet was a success, which pleased Rachmaninoff, and he wrote his Symphonic Dances in 1940 with Fokine in mind. He played the piano version for Fokine, but both died before the idea got any further.

The Rhapsody has also been used for ballets by Leonid Lavrovsky (Bolshoi Ballet, Moscow, 1960), Frederick Ashton (Royal Ballet, London, 1980), and Ivo van Zwieten.

== Selected recordings ==
External audio
- Performance of Rhapsody on a Theme of Paganini played by Sergei Rachmaninoff with the Philadelphia Orchestra conducted by Leopold Stokowski in 1934

Piano	Conductor	Orchestra	Record company	Year of recording	Format
Sergei Rachmaninoff	Leopold Stokowski	Philadelphia Orchestra	RCA Victor Red Seal	1934	CD
Benno Moiseiwitsch	Basil Cameron	Liverpool Philharmonic Orchestra	Naxos Records	1938	CD
William Kapell	Fritz Reiner	Robin Hood Dell Orchestra	RCA Victor Red Seal	1951	CD
Arthur Rubinstein	Fritz Reiner	Chicago Symphony Orchestra	RCA Victor Red Seal	1956	CD
Leon Fleisher	George Szell	Cleveland Orchestra	Columbia Masterworks	1957	CD
Leonard Pennario	Erich Leinsdorf	Los Angeles Philharmonic	Capitol Records	1958	LP, rereleased on CD by Seraphim
Vladimir Ashkenazy	André Previn	London Symphony Orchestra	London Records	1971	CD
Dmitri Alexeev	Yuri Temirkanov	St. Petersburg Philharmonic Orchestra	RCA Victor Red Seal	1995	CD
Van Cliburn	Kirill Kondrashin	Moscow Philharmonic Orchestra	RCA Victor Red Seal	1972	CD
Yuja Wang	Claudio Abbado	Mahler Chamber Orchestra	Deutsche Grammophon	2011	CD
Daniil Trifonov	Yannick Nézet-Séguin	Philadelphia Orchestra	Deutsche Grammophon	2015	CD

== Popular culture ==
The 18th variation, by far the most popular, has been used in various movie and TV show soundtracks to different degrees. This includes:

- The Story of Three Loves (1953)
- Somewhere in Time (1980 film)
- Singapore Sling (1990 film)
- Dead Again (1991)
- Felicidade (1992 TV show, Episode 82)
- Groundhog Day (1993 film)
- Ronin (1998 film)
- The Byron Janis Story (2010 TV movie documentary)
- The Walking Dead (TV series) (2010 TV show, Season 10 Episode 8)
- Nikolina and Tomislav (2013 short)
- Alive Inside: A Story of Music and Memory (2014 documentary)
- The Good Wife (2015)

Winifred Atwell's recording of the 18th variation as a theme from The Story of Three Loves reached No. 9 on the UK chart.

The coda to "Everywhere" by Fleetwood Mac and the song "If I Had You" by The Korgis use the melody fragment from the 18th variation.

The video game Gran Turismo 6 uses the 18th variation as the intro theme, performed by Lang Lang.

== See also ==
- List of variations on a theme by another composer
