= Variations on a Theme of Corelli =

1931 set of variations by Sergei Rachmaninoff

Rachmaninoff Corelli theme

Variations on a Theme of Corelli (Russian: Вариации на тему А. Корелли, Variatsii na temu A. Korelli), Op. 42, is a set of variations for solo piano, written in 1931 by the Russian composer Sergei Rachmaninoff. He composed the variations at his holiday home in Switzerland.

The theme is La Folia, which was not in fact composed by Arcangelo Corelli, but was used by him in 1700 as the basis for 23 variations in his Sonata for violin and continuo (violone or harpsichord) in D minor, Op. 5, No. 12. La Folia was popular as a basis for variations in Baroque music. Franz Liszt used the same theme in his Rhapsodie espagnole S. 254 (1863).

Rachmaninoff dedicated the work to his friend the violinist Fritz Kreisler. He wrote to another friend, the composer Nikolai Medtner, on 21 December 1931:

I've played the Variations about fifteen times, but of these fifteen performances only one was good. The others were sloppy. I can't play my own compositions! And it's so boring! Not once have I played these all in continuity. I was guided by the coughing of the audience. Whenever the coughing would increase, I would skip the next variation. Whenever there was no coughing, I would play them in proper order. In one concert, I don't remember where - some small town - the coughing was so violent that I played only ten variations (out of 20). My best record was set in New York, where I played 18 variations. However, I hope that you will play all of them, and won't "cough".

Rachmaninoff recorded many of his own works, but this piece wasn't one of them.

== Structure ==
The Theme is followed by 20 variations, an Intermezzo between variations 13 and 14, and a Coda to finish. All variations are in D minor except where noted.

- Theme. Andante
- Variation 1. Poco piu mosso
- Variation 2. L'istesso tempo
- Variation 3. Tempo di Minuetto
- Variation 4. Andante
- Variation 5. Allegro (ma non tanto)
- Variation 6. L'istesso tempo
- Variation 7. Vivace
- Variation 8. Adagio misterioso
- Variation 9. Un poco piu mosso
- Variation 10. Allegro scherzando
- Variation 11. Allegro vivace
- Variation 12. L'istesso tempo
- Variation 13. Agitato
- Intermezzo
- Variation 14. Andante (come prima) (D♭ major)
- Variation 15. L'istesso tempo (D♭ major)
- Variation 16. Allegro vivace
- Variation 17. Meno mosso
- Variation 18. Allegro con brio
- Variation 19. Piu mosso. Agitato
- Variation 20. Piu mosso
- Coda. Andante

Rachmaninoff noted in the score that variations 11, 12, and 19 could be omitted at the performer’s discretion.

== See also ==
- List of variations on a theme by another composer
