= List of compositions by Sergei Rachmaninoff =

List of works by Sergei Rachmaninoff

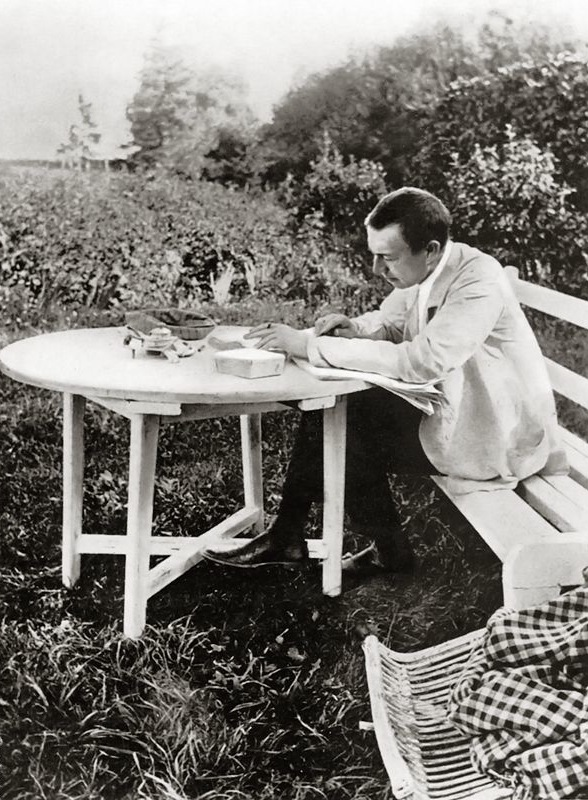
Rachmaninoff at his estate Ivanovka, proofing his Piano Concerto No. 3 (1910)

This is a complete list of compositions by Sergei Rachmaninoff (1873–1943).

Rachmaninoff's compositions cover a variety of musical forms and genres. Born in Novgorod, Russia in 1873, he studied at the Moscow Conservatory with Nikolai Zverev, Alexander Siloti, Sergei Taneyev and Anton Arensky, and while there, composed some of his most famous works, including the first piano concerto (Op. 1) and the Prelude in C♯ minor (Op. 3, No. 2). Although spread over three different opuses, he did go on to complete an important set of 24 preludes in all the major and minor keys.

His Symphony No. 1 (Op. 13) was one of his first compositions as a "Free Artist" after graduation, and subsequently his first critical failure. The derision he received sent him into depression. After undergoing autosuggestive therapy, he regained his confidence and composed his second piano concerto (Op. 18), which is widely considered as one of the best piano concertos. In 1909, he made his first concert tour of the United States, and composed his Piano Concerto No. 3 (Op. 30), notable for its structural ingenuity and technical difficulty. After this, due to emigration from Russia in 1917 and his busy concert career, his output as a composer greatly decreased, and during this period, he completed only six compositions. His last major work, Symphonic Dances (Op. 45), was completed in the US in 1940.

== Works by musical form ==
Opus	Title	Instrumentation	Date completed	Excerpt
=== Orchestra ===
	Scherzo in D minor	Orchestra	1887	
	Manfred	Orchestra	1891, lost	
	Suite in D minor	Orchestra	1891	
	Youth Symphony, unfinished	Orchestra	1891	
	Prince Rostislav	Orchestra	1891	
7	The Rock	Orchestra	1893	
	Two Don Juan Episodes	Orchestra	1894, lost	
12	Caprice bohémien	Orchestra	1894	
13	Symphony No. 1	Orchestra	1895	
27	Symphony No. 2	Orchestra	1908	
29	Isle of the Dead	Orchestra	1908	
44	Symphony No. 3	Orchestra	1936	
45	Symphonic Dances	Orchestra	1940	
=== Chamber ===
	Romance in A minor	Violin & Piano	1885	
	String Quartet No. 1	Two Violins, Viola, & Cello	1890?	
	Lied in F minor	Cello & Piano	1890	
	Mélodie on a Theme of Rachmaninoff	Violin or Cello & Piano	1890?	
	Trio élégiaque No. 1	Violin, Cello, & Piano	1892	
2	Two Pieces (Prelude, Danse orientale)	Cello & Piano	1892	
6	Morceaux de salon (Romance, Danse hongroise)	Violin & Piano	1893	
9	Trio élégiaque No. 2	Piano, Violin & Cello	1893, revised 1906 (Boosey & Hawkes ed.), 1913 (modern Russian ed.)	
	String Quartet No. 2	Two Violins, Viola, & Cello	1896?	
19	Cello Sonata	Cello & Piano	1901	Cello Sonata (Op. 19).
=== Piano & Orchestra ===
	Concerto in C minor, projected	Piano & Orchestra	1889	
1	Piano Concerto No. 1 in F♯ minor	Piano & Orchestra	1891, revised 1917	
18	Piano Concerto No. 2 in C minor	Piano & Orchestra	1901	
30	Piano Concerto No. 3 in D minor	Piano & Orchestra	1909	Piano Concerto No. 3 (Op. 30) is notable for its massive ossia.
40	Piano Concerto No. 4 in G minor	Piano & Orchestra	1926, first revised in 1928 and final version in 1941	
43	Rhapsody on a Theme of Paganini	Piano & Orchestra	1934	
=== Solo Piano ===
	Étude in F♯ major [lost]	Piano	1886?	
	Song Without Words in D minor	Piano	1887?	
	Lento in D minor	Piano	1887?	
	Four Pieces: Romance / Andante, in F♯ minor; Prélude / Allegro, in E♭ minor; Mélodie / Andante, in E major; Gavotte / Allegro, in D major	Piano	1887	
	Three Nocturnes: 1. Andante cantabile – Allegro vivace, in F♯ minor (1887); 2. Andante maestoso – Allegro assai, in F major (1887); 3. Andante – Allegro moderato, in C minor (1888)	Piano	1887/88	
	Piece (Canon) in E minor	Piano	1891	
	Fugue in D minor	Piano	1891	
	Prelude in F major	Piano	1891	
3	Morceaux de fantaisie: No. 1, Élégie in E♭ minor; No. 2, Prélude in C♯ minor; No. 3, Mélodie in E major (revised in 1940); No. 4, Polichinelle; No. 5, Serenade (revised in 1940)	Piano	1892	Prelude in C♯ minor (Op. 3, No. 2) is famous for its theme and coda.
10	Morceaux de salon: No. 1, Nocturne in A minor; No. 2, Valse in A major; No. 3, Barcarolle in G minor; No. 4, Mélodie in E minor; No. 5, Humoresque in G major (revised in 1940); No. 6, Romance in F minor; No. 7, Mazurka in D♭ major	Piano	1894	
	Four Improvisations (with Arensky, Glazunov, Taneyev)	Piano	1896	
16	Six moments musicaux: No. 1 Andantino in B♭ minor; No. 2 Allegretto in E♭ minor; No. 3 Andante cantabile in B minor; No. 4 Presto in E minor; No. 5 Adagio sostenuto in D♭ major; No. 6 Maestoso in C major	Piano	1896	Six moments musicaux (Op. 16), range in style from the slow Andantino (pictured) to the torrential Presto.
	Morceau de Fantaisie in G minor	Piano	1899	
	Fughetta in F major	Piano	1899	
22	Variations on a Theme of Chopin	Piano	1903	
23	Ten Preludes: No. 1, in F♯ minor; No. 2, in B♭ major; No. 3, in D minor; No. 4, in D major; No. 5, in G minor; No. 6, in E♭ major; No. 7, in C minor; No. 8, in A♭ major; No. 9, in E♭ minor; No. 10, in G♭ major	Piano	1903	Prelude in G minor (Op. 23, No. 5) embodies his Russian spirit.
28	Piano Sonata No. 1	Piano	1908	
32	Thirteen Preludes: No. 1, in C major; No. 2, in B♭ minor; No. 3, in E major; No. 4, in E minor; No. 5, in G major; No. 6, in F minor; No. 7, in F major; No. 8, in A minor; No. 9, in A major; No. 10, in B minor; No. 11, in B major; No. 12, in G♯ minor; No. 13, in D♭ major	Piano	1910	No. 8 A minor No. 9 A majorNo. 10 in B minor
33	Études-Tableaux: No. 1, in F minor; No. 2, in C major; No. 3, in C minor; No. 4, in D minor; No. 5, in E♭ minor; No. 6, in E♭ major; No. 7, in G minor; No. 8, in C♯ minor	Piano	1911	Étude Tableaux No. 7 in G minor begins with soft arpeggios played at the pianissimo volume.
36	Piano Sonata No. 2	Piano	1913, revised 1931	
39	Études-Tableaux: No. 1, in C minor; No. 2, in A minor; No. 3, in F♯ minor; No. 4, in B minor; No. 5, in E♭ minor; No. 6, in A minor; No. 7, in C minor; No. 8, in D minor; No. 9, in D major	Piano	1916	The rhythmic Étude Tableaux No. 9 in D major opens in a giant chordal flourish.
	Four Pieces: Prelude in D minor; Piano Piece in A♭ Major; Oriental Sketch; Fragments	Piano	1917	
42	Variations on a Theme of Corelli	Piano	1931	
=== Other Piano ===
	Two Pieces (Valse, Romance)	Piano - Six Hands	1891	
	Russian Rhapsody	Two Pianos	1891	
5	Suite No. 1 (or Fantaisie-Tableaux for two pianos)	Two Pianos	1893	
	Romance in G major	Piano Duet	1894?	
11	Six Morceaux: No. 1, Barcarolle; No. 2, Scherzo; No. 3, Thème Russe; No. 4, Valse; No. 5, Romance; No. 6, Slava	Piano Duet	1894	
17	Suite No. 2	Two Pianos	1901	The first movement of Suite No. 2 (Op. 17) is full of idiosyncratically large and thick chords.
	Polka Italienne	Piano Duet	1906?	
=== Transcriptions ===
	Transcription of Tchaikovsky: Manfred Symphony	Piano Duet	1886, lost	
	Transcription of Tchaikovsky: The Sleeping Beauty	Piano Duet	1891	
	Transcription of Glazunov: Symphony No. 6	Piano Duet	1896	
	Paraphrase of Bizet: Minuet from L'Arlésienne	Piano	1900, revised 1922	
	Transcription of Franz Behr: Lachtäubchen, Op. 303 (published as Polka de W.R.)	Piano	1911	
	Transcription of John Stafford Smith: The Star-Spangled Banner	Piano	1918	
	Cadenza for Liszt: Hungarian Rhapsody No. 2	Piano	1919	
	Paraphrase of Kreisler: Liebesleid	Piano	1921	
	Paraphrase of Mussorgsky: Gopak from The Fair at Sorochyntsi	Piano	1923	
	Paraphrase of Schubert: Wohin? (D795/2)	Piano	1925	
	Paraphrase of Kreisler: Liebesfreud	Piano	1925	
	Paraphrase of Mussorgsky: Gopak from The Fair at Sorochyntsi	Piano & Violin	1926	
	Paraphrase of Rimsky-Korsakov: Flight of the Bumblebee	Piano	1929	
	Paraphrase of Mendelssohn: Scherzo from the Incidental music to Shakespeare's A Midsummer Night's Dream	Piano	1933	
	Paraphrase of Bach: movements from Partita No. 3 in E major for unaccompanied violin (BWV 1006)	Piano	1933 or 1934	
	Paraphrase of Tchaikovsky: Lullaby (Cradle Song Op.16, No.1)	Piano	1941	
=== Operas ===
	Esmeralda	Voices (multiple soloists), Choir, Orchestra and Piano	1888	Opera Duet, performed by the Moscow Conservatory, Orchestration by D. Yurovsky | Soloists: Irina Dolzhenko (mezzo-soprano) and Nikolai Kazansky (bass-baritone)
	Aleko (Russian: Алеко)		1892	
24	The Miserly Knight (Russian: Скупой рыцарь)		1904	
25	Francesca da Rimini (Russian: Франческа да Римини)		1905	
	Salammbô, projected		1906	
	Monna Vanna, unfinished		1908	
=== Choral works ===
	Deus Meus	Six-Part Mixed Chorus	1890?	
	O Mother of God Perpetually Praying: a Choral Concerto in G minor	Mixed Chorus	1893	
	Chorus of Spirits	Mixed Chorus	1894?	
	Song of the Nightingale	Four-Part Mixed Chorus & Piano	1894?	
15	Six Choruses for Women's or Children's Voices: Be Praised; Night; The Pine; The Waves Slumbered; Slavery; The Angel	Women's or Children's Chorus	1895	
	Panteley the Healer	Mixed Chorus	1899	
20	Spring, cantata	Baritone Solo, Chorus, & Orchestra	1902	
31	Liturgy of St. John Chrysostom	chorus	1910	
35	The Bells	Voice Soloists, Chorus, & Orchestra	1913	
37	All-Night Vigil	Chorus	1915	
41	Three Russian Songs	Chorus & Orchestra	1927	
=== Solo Voice & Piano ===
	"Again you are Bestirred, my Heart"		1890 or 1893	
	"At the Gates of the Holy Cloister"		1890	
	Two monologues from Boris Godunov, opera by Mussorgsky		1891?	
	"C'était en avril"		1891	
	"Dusk was Falling"		1891	
4	Six Songs: "Oh No, I Beg You, Do Not Leave!"; "Morning"; "In the Silence of the Secret Night"; "Sing not, O Lovely One"; "The Harvest of Sorrow"; "It Was Not Long Ago, My Friend"		1890–1893	The lyrics of "The Harvest of Sorrow" (Op. 4, No. 5) are based on a text by Aleksei Tolstoy that laments a failed harvest.
	"Song of the Disenchanted,"		1893?	
	"Do you Remember the Evening?"		1893?	
	"The Flower Died"		1893	
8	Six Songs: "Water Lily"; "My Child, Your Beauty is That of a Flower"; "Thoughts, Reflections"; "I Fell in Love, To My Sorrow"; "A Dream"; "Prayer"		1893	
14	Twelve Songs: "I Await You"; "Small Island"; "How Fleeting is Delight in Love"; "I was with Her"; "Summer Nights"; "You are so Beloved by All"; "Do Not Believe me, Friend"; "Oh, do not Grieve"; "She is as Beautiful as Midday"; "In my Soul"; "Spring Torrents"; "It is Time!"		1896	
	"Were you Hiccupping?"		1899	
	"Night"		1900	
21	Twelve Songs: "Fate"; "By a Fresh Grave"; "Twilight"; "They Replied"; "Lilacs"; "Fragment from 'de Musset'"; "How Peaceful"; "On the Death of a Linnet"; "Melody"; "Before the Icon"; "I am not a Prophet"; "How Pained I am"		1902	
26	Fifteen Songs: "There are Many Sounds"; "All was Taken from Me"; "We shall Rest"; "Two Farewells"; "Let us Leave, my Sweet"; "Christ is Risen"; "To the Children"; "Beg for Mercy"; "I am Again Alone"; "At my Window"; "The Fountain"; "Night is Sorrowful"; "Yesterday we Met"; "The Ring"; "All Passes"		1906	
	"Letter to Stanislavsky"		1908	
34	Fourteen Songs: "The Muse"; "In the Soul of Each of Us"; "The Storm"; "The Migrant Wind"; "Arion"; "The Raising of Lazarus"; "It Cannot Be"; "Music"; "You Knew Him"; "I Remember that Day"; "The Herald"; "What Happiness"; "Dissonance"; "Vocalise" (listed separately below)		1912	Vocalise (Op. 34, No. 14) is sung without words and has been arranged for many different instrument combinations.
	"Vocalise"		1915	
	"From the Gospel of St. John"		1915	
	"Prayer"		1916	
	"All Things Wish to Sing"		1916	
38	Six Songs: "At Night in my Garden"; "To Her"; "Daisies"; "The Pied Piper"; "Sleep"; "A-oo!"		1916	

== Chronological sequence ==
Composed	Opus	Title	Instrumentation
1885		Romance in A minor	violin and piano
1886		Transcription of Tchaikovsky: Manfred Symphony	piano duet
1886		Étude in F♯ major	piano
1887		Lento in D minor	piano
1887		Four Pieces: Romance, Prelude, Mélodie, Gavotte	piano
1887		Scherzo in D minor	orchestra
1888		Three Nocturnes: Andante cantabile, Andante maestoso-Allegro assai, Andante	piano
1888		Esmeralda	opera
1889		Concerto in C minor	piano and orchestra
1890		String Quartet No. 1: Romance (Andante Espressivo), Scherzo (Allegro)	two violins, viola, and cello
1890		Lied	cello and piano
1890		Melodie on a Theme of Rachmaninoff	violin/cello and piano
1890–1	1	Piano Concerto No. 1 in F♯ minor, revised 1917	piano concerto
1890–1		Transcription of Tchaikovsky: The Sleeping Beauty	piano duet
1890–1		Two Pieces (Valse, Romance)	piano six hands
1890		"At the Gates of the Holy Cloister"	solo voice and piano
1890		"Nothing Shall I Say You"	solo voice and piano
1890		Deus Meus	six-part mixed chorus
1890–1		Manfred, symphonic poem	orchestra
1891		Fugue in D minor	piano
1891		Suite in D minor	orchestra, piano solo
1891		Youth Symphony	orchestra
1891		Prince Rostislav, symphonic poem	orchestra
1891		Two monologues from Boris Godunov, opera by Mussorgsky	solo voice and piano
1891		"C'était en avril"	solo voice and piano
1891		"Dusk was Falling"	solo voice and piano
1891		Prelude in F major	piano
1891		Symphonic Movement in D minor	orchestra
1891		Russian Rhapsody	two pianos
1891–2	2	Two Pieces (Prelude, Danse Orientale)	cello and piano
1892		Trio élégiaque in G minor	violin, cello, and piano
1892		Aleko	opera
1892	3	Cinq Morceaux de Fantaisie	piano
		No. 1, Élégie in E♭ minor	
		No. 2, Prélude in C♯ minor	
		No. 3, Mélodie in E major (revised in 1940)	
		No. 4, Polichinelle	
		No. 5, Serenade (revised in 1940)	
1893		"Again you are Bestirred, my Heart"	solo voice and piano
1893		"Song of the Disenchanted,"	solo voice and piano
1893		"Do you Remember the Evening?"	solo voice and piano
1893		"The Flower Died"	solo voice and piano
1893		O Mother of God Perpetually Praying	mixed chorus
1893	4	Six Songs	solo voice and piano
		"Oh No, I Beg You, Do Not Leave!"	
		"Morning"	
		"In the Silence of the Secret Night"	
		"Sing not, O Lovely One"	
		"The Harvest of Sorrow"	
		"It Was Not Long Ago, My Friend"	
1893	5	Suite No. 1 (or Fantaisie-Tableaux)	two pianos
1893	6	Deux Morceaux de Salon (Romance, Danse hongroise)	violin and piano
1893	7	The Rock, symphonic poem	orchestra
1893	8	Six Songs	solo voice and piano
		"Water Lily"	
		"My Child, Your Beauty is That of a Flower"	
		"Thoughts, Reflections"	
		"I Fell in Love, To My Sorrow"	
		"A Dream"	
		"Prayer"	
1893	9	Trio élégiaque No. 2, revised 1906	piano, violin, and cello
1893–4	10	Sept Morceaux de Salon	piano
		No. 1, Nocturne in A minor	
		No. 2, Valse in A major	
		No. 3, Barcarolle in G minor	
		No. 4, Mélodie in E minor	
		No. 5, Humoresque in G major (revised in 1940)	
		No. 6, Romance in F minor	
		No. 7, Mazurka in D♭ major	
1894		Chorus of Spirits	mixed chorus
1894		Song of the Nightingale	four-part mixed chorus and piano
1894		Romance in G major	piano duet
1894	11	Six Morceaux	piano duet
		No. 1, Barcarolle	
		No. 2, Scherzo	
		No. 3, Thème Russe	
		No. 4, Valse	
		No. 5, Romance	
		No. 6, Slava	
1894		Two Don Juan Episodes (projected)	orchestra
1894	12	Capriccio Bohémien	orchestra
1895	13	Symphony No. 1	orchestra
1894–6	14	Twelve Songs	solo voice and piano
		"I Await You"	
		"Small Island"	
		"How Fleeting is Delight in Love"	
		"I was with Her"	
		"Summer Nights"	
		"You are so Beloved by All"	
		"Do Not Believe me, Friend"	
		"Oh, do not Grieve"	
		"She is as Beautiful as Midday"	
		"In my Soul"	
		"Spring Torrents"	
		"It is Time!"	
1895–6	15	Six Choruses for Women's or Children's Voices	Women's or Children's chorus
		Be Praised	
		Night	
		The Pine	
		The Waves Slumbered	
		Slavery	
		The Angel	
1896		String Quartet No. 2: Allegro Moderato, Andante molto sostenuto	two violins, viola, and cello
1896		Four Improvisations (with Arensky, Glazunov, Taneyev)	piano
1896	16	Six Moments Musicaux	piano
		No. 1 Andantino in B♭ minor	
		No. 2 Allegretto in E♭ minor	
		No. 3 Andante cantabile in B minor	
		No. 4 Presto in E minor	
		No. 5 Adagio sostenuto in D♭ major	
		No. 6 Maestoso in C major	
1896		Transcription of Glazunov: Symphony No. 6	piano duet
1899		Morceau de Fantaisie in G minor	piano
1899		Fughetta in F major	piano
1899		Panteley the Healer	mixed chorus
1899		"Were you Hiccupping?"	solo voice and piano
1900		"Night"	solo voice and piano
1900		Paraphrase of Bizet: Minuet from L'Arlésienne, revised 1922	piano
1900–1	17	Suite No. 2	two pianos
1900–1	18	Piano Concerto No. 2 in C Minor	piano concerto
1901	19	Cello Sonata in G minor	cello and piano
1902	20	Spring Cantata	baritone solo, chorus, and orchestra
1900–2	21	Twelve Songs	solo voice and piano
		"Fate"	
		"By a Fresh Grave"	
		"Twilight"	
		"They Replied"	
		"Lilacs"	
		"Fragment from 'de Musset'"	
		"How Peaceful"	
		"On the Death of a Linnet"	
		"Melody"	
		"Before the Icon"	
		"I am not a Prophet"	
		"How Pained I am"	
1903	22	Variations on a Theme of Chopin	piano
1901–3	23	Ten Preludes	piano
		No. 1, in F♯ minor	
		No. 2, in B♭ major	
		No. 3, in D minor	
		No. 4, in D major	
		No. 5, in G minor	
		No. 6, in E♭ major	
		No. 7, in C minor	
		No. 8, in A♭ major	
		No. 9, in E♭ minor	
		No. 10, in G♭ major	
1903–5	24	The Miserly Knight	opera
1904–5	25	Francesca da Rimini	opera
1906		Salammbô (projected)	opera
1906		Polka Italienne	piano duet
1906	26	Fifteen Songs	solo voice and piano
		"There are Many Sounds"	
		"All was Taken from Me"	
		"We shall Rest"	
		"Two Farewells"	
		"Let us Leave, my Sweet"	
		"Christ is Risen"	
		"To the Children"	
		"Beg for Mercy"	
		"I am Again Alone"	
		"At my Window"	
		"The Fountain"	
		"Night is Sorrowful"	
		"Yesterday we Met"	
		"The Ring"	
		"All Passes"	
1906–7	27	Symphony No. 2	orchestra
1906–8		Monna Vanna (unfinished)	opera
1908	28	Piano Sonata No. 1 in D minor	piano
1908		"Letter to Stanislavsky"	
1909	29	Isle of the Dead, symphonic poem	orchestra
1909	30	Piano Concerto No. 3 in D minor	piano concerto
1910	31	Liturgy of St. John Chrysostom	unaccompanied mixed chorus
1910	32	Thirteen Preludes	piano
		No. 1, in C major	
		No. 2, in B♭ minor	
		No. 3, in E major	
		No. 4, in E minor	
		No. 5, in G major	
		No. 6, in F minor	
		No. 7, in F major	
		No. 8, in A minor	
		No. 9, in A major	
		No. 10, in B minor	
		No. 11, in B major	
		No. 12, in G♯ minor	
		No. 13, in D♭ major	
1911		Transcription of Franz Behr: Lachtäubchen, Op. 303 (published as Polka de W.R.)	piano
1911	33	Études-Tableaux	piano
		No. 1, in F minor	
		No. 2, in C major	
		No. 3, in C minor	
		No. 4, in D minor	
		No. 5, in E♭ minor	
		No. 6, in E♭ major	
		No. 7, in G minor	
		No. 8, in C♯ minor	
1910–2	34	Fourteen Songs	solo voice and piano
		"The Muse"	
		"In the Soul of Each of Us"	
		"The Storm"	
		"The Migrant Wind"	
		"Arion"	
		"The Raising of Lazarus"	
		"It Cannot Be"	
		"Music"	
		"You Knew Him"	
		"I Remember that Day"	
		"The Herald"	
		"What Happiness"	
		"Dissonance"	
1913	35	The Bells	voice soloists, chorus, and orchestra
1913	36	Piano Sonata No. 2 in B♭ minor, revised 1931	piano
1915		"Vocalise" (included in op. 34 as no. 14)	solo voice and piano
1915		"From the Gospel of St. John"	solo voice and piano
1915	37	All-Night Vigil	unaccompanied mixed chorus
1916		"Prayer"	solo voice and piano
1916		"All Things Wish to Sing"	solo voice and piano
1916	38	Six Songs	solo voice and piano
		"At Night in my Garden"	
		"To Her"	
		"Daisies"	
		"The Pied Piper"	
		"Sleep"	
		"A-oo!"	
1916	39	Études-Tableaux	piano
		No. 1, in C minor	
		No. 2, in A minor	
		No. 3, in F♯ minor	
		No. 4, in B minor	
		No. 5, in E♭ minor	
		No. 6, in A minor	
		No. 7, in C minor	
		No. 8, in D minor	
		No. 9, in D major	
1917		Four Pieces (Prelude in D minor, Piano Piece in A♭ Major, Oriental Sketch, Fragments)	piano
1918		Paraphrase of John Stafford Smith: The Star-Spangled Banner	piano
1919		Cadenza for Liszt: Hungarian Rhapsody No. 2	piano
1921		Paraphrase of Kreisler: Liebesleid	piano
1923		Paraphrase of Mussorgsky: Gopak from The Fair at Sorochyntsi	piano
1925		Paraphrase of Schubert: Wohin? (D795/2)	piano
1925		Paraphrase of Kreisler: Liebesfreud	piano
1926		Paraphrase of Mussorgsky: Gopak from The Fair at Sorochyntsi	piano and violin
1926	40	Piano Concerto No. 4 in G minor, revised 1941	piano concerto
1927	41	Three Russian Songs	chorus and orchestra
1929		Paraphrase of Rimsky-Korsakov: Flight of the Bumblebee	piano
1931	42	Variations on a Theme of Corelli	piano
1933		Paraphrase of Mendelssohn: Scherzo from A Midsummer Night's Dream	piano
1934		Paraphrase of Bach: movements from Partita No. 3 in E major (BWV 1006)	piano
1934	43	Rhapsody on a Theme of Paganini	piano and orchestra
1936	44	Symphony No. 3	orchestra
1940	45	Symphonic Dances	orchestra
1941		Paraphrase of Tchaikovsky: Lullaby	piano

== Sources ==
=== References ===
- Bertensson, Sergei; Jay Leyda (2001). Sergei Rachmaninoff: A Lifetime in Music. Bloomington, Indiana: Indiana University. ISBN 0-253-21421-1.
- Harrison, Max (2006). Rachmaninoff: Life, Works, Recordings. London: Continuum. ISBN 0-8264-9312-2.
- Norris, Geoffrey (1993). The Master Musicians: Rachmaninoff. New York City: Schirmer Books. ISBN 0-02-870685-4.
- Randel, Don M. (1999). The Harvard Concise Dictionary of Music and Musicians. Cambridge, Massachusetts: Harvard University Press (Belknap). ISBN 0-674-00978-9.
- Seroff, Victor Ilyitch (1950). Rachmaninoff. New York City, New York: Simon & Schuster. OCLC 253711744.
