= Prince Rostislav =

Prince Rostislav may refer to:

- Prince Rostislav (Rachmaninoff), a symphonic poem by Sergei Rachmaninoff
- Prince Rostislav (poem), a poem by Alexey Konstantinovich Tolstoy
