= Morceaux de salon =

Morceaux de salon may refer to:

- Morceaux de salon, Op. 6 (Rachmaninoff) for violin and piano by Sergei Rachmaninoff
- Morceaux de salon, Op. 10 (Rachmaninoff) for piano solo by Sergei Rachmaninoff
