= Six moments musicaux (Rachmaninoff) =

Solo piano pieces by Sergei Rachmaninoff

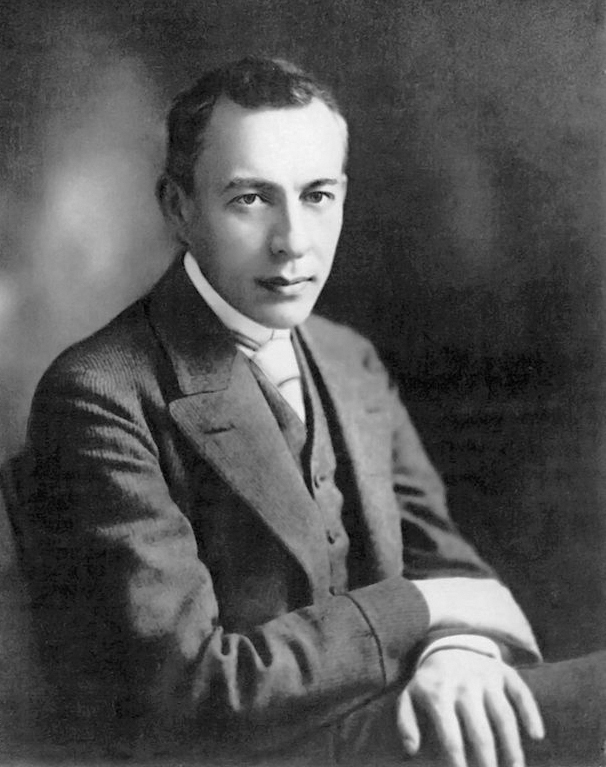
Sergei Rachmaninoff in 1901

Six moments musicaux (French for "Six Musical Moments"; Russian: Шесть музыкальных моментов, romanized: Shest’ muzykál’nykh moméntov), Op. 16, is a set of solo piano pieces composed by the Russian composer Sergei Rachmaninoff between October and December 1896. Each Moment musical reproduces a musical form characteristic of a previous musical era. The forms that appear in Rachmaninoff's incarnation are the nocturne, song without words, barcarolle, virtuoso étude, and theme and variations.

The individual pieces have been described as "true concert works, being best served on a stage and with a concert grand." Although composed as part of a set, each piece stands on its own as a concert solo with individual themes and moods. The pieces span a variety of themes ranging from the funeral march of number three to the canon of number six, the Moments musicaux are both Rachmaninoff's return to and revolution of solo piano composition. A typical performance lasts 30 minutes.

In an interview in 1941, Rachmaninoff said, "What I try to do, when writing down my music, is to make it say simply and directly that which is in my heart when I am composing." Even though Moments musicaux were written because he was short of money, the pieces summarize his knowledge of piano composition up to that point. Andantino opens the set with a long, reflective melody that develops into a rapid climax. The second piece, Allegretto, is the first of the few in the set that reveal his mastery of piano technique. Andante cantabile is a contrast to its two surrounding pieces, explicitly named "funeral march" and "lament." Presto draws inspiration from several sources, including the Preludes of Frédéric Chopin, to synthesize an explosion of melodic intensity. The fifth, Adagio sostenuto is a respite in barcarolle form, before the finale Maestoso, which closes the set in a thick three-part texture.

== Background ==
By the fall of 1896, 23-year old Rachmaninoff's financial status was precarious, not helped by his being robbed of money on an earlier train trip. Pressed for time, both financially and by those expecting a symphony, he "rushed into production." On December 7, he wrote to Aleksandr Zatayevich, a Russian composer he had met before he had composed the work, saying, "I hurry in order to get money I need by a certain date ... This perpetual financial pressure is, on the one hand, quite beneficial ... by the 20th of this month I have to write six piano pieces." Rachmaninoff completed all six during October and December 1896, and dedicated all to Zatayevich. Despite the hasty circumstances, the work evidences his early virtuosity, and sets an example for the quality of his future works.

Six moments musicaux is a sophisticated work that is of longer duration, thicker textures, and greater virtuosic demands on the performer than any of Rachmaninoff's previous solo piano works. It is similar to Alexander Scriabin's momentous Étude in D♯ minor (Op. 8, No. 12)—in both compositions, detail is more functional than ornamentative in their musical argument. It is here, rather than in Morceaux de fantaisie (Op. 3, 1892) or Morceaux de salon (Op. 10, 1894), that Rachmaninoff places specific qualities of his own playing into his music. There is passionate lyricism in numbers three and five, but the others require a pianist with virtuoso technique and musical perception. These were composed during the middle of Rachmaninoff's career, and created a foundation of inner voices that he would elaborate on in his Preludes (Op. 23) and Études-Tableaux (Op. 33). Although he usually gave the première of his own piano works, he was not the first to perform these, and the date of the first public performance has not yet been determined.

The set's name is inspired by Franz Schubert's collection of six short piano pieces, also called Six moments musicaux (Op. 94, 1828).

== Composition ==
=== 1. Andantino, B♭ minor ===
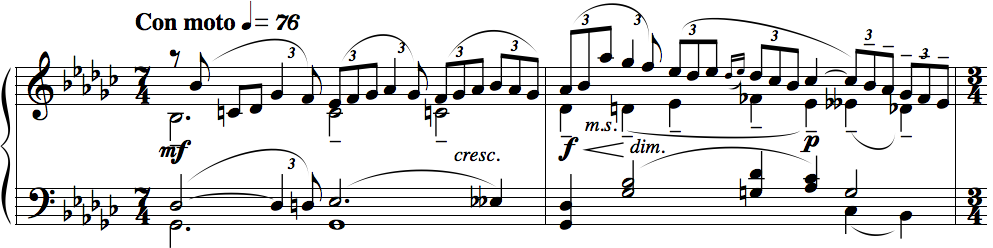
In Andantino, the Con moto shows off the long melody in a compound meter (7/4). Listen

The first piece has an andantino (moderate) tempo, is 113 measures long, and is marked at = 72. It is divided into three distinct sections. The first presents a theme in common time (4/4) with a typical nocturne figure for the left hand. A mid-piece pause at roughly the same area in Schubert's first Moments musicaux further emphasizes the influence of Schubert. The second part is marked con moto (with motion), at = 76, and is a variation of the first theme in the unusual configuration of seven quarter notes per measure (7/4). This part ends in a cadenza. The third section presents the last variation of the theme, again in common time, but in the fastest tempo yet, Andantino con moto, at = 84. The piece ends in a coda that returns to the first tempo, and repeats portions of the previous three parts. It ends with a perfect authentic cadence into B♭ minor.

Andantino is the longest in the set by playing time (about eight and a half minutes). It is described as a "generic hybrid", combining elements of the nocturne and theme and variation genres. The melody is chromatic, syncopated, and long, all idiosyncratic elements Rachmaninoff often includes in his works. Because of this, the Andantino is sometimes called an extension of his Nocturne in A minor of the Morceaux de Salon set (Op. 10, No. 1, 1894). However, Andantino stands on its own with difficulties, such as the sections with multiple phrases in a single hand.

=== 2. Allegretto, E♭ minor ===
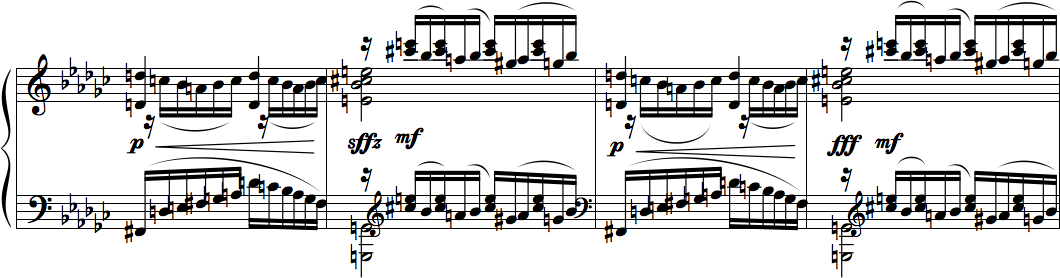
In Allegretto's section two, the dynamics change so frequently they become one of the major hurdles in this piece.

The second piece, referred to as a "glittering showpiece", is positioned in contrast to the lyrical and "atmospheric" melody of the first piece. The piece is in the quick tempo allegretto (quickly), at = 92. It is 131 measures long, the most of all six pieces, but the second shortest in terms of playing time, usually no longer than three and a half minutes (the shortest is number four). This piece represents a typical nineteenth-century étude, similar in style to Frédéric Chopin's Études (Opp. 10, 25), with a melody interspersed between rapid sextuplet figures. It is in strict ternary form with a coda: identical beginning and ending sections beginning on measures 1 and 85, and a contrasting middle section starting on measure 45. The second section radically changes dynamics, constantly changing from piano to fortissimo and even sforzando. It is, throughout, a relentless torrent of descending half steps and a cascading left hand figure reminiscent of Chopin's Revolutionary Étude (Op. 10, No. 12, 1831). Ending the piece is a slow coda in Adagio (at ease) which closes with a plagal cadence in E♭ minor.

Rachmaninoff revised this piece in March 1940, changing the melody but leaving the constant sextuplets, proving that the rushing figures are not simple bravura or flair.

=== 3. Andante cantabile, B minor ===
No. 3, B minor
Performed by Debbie Hu

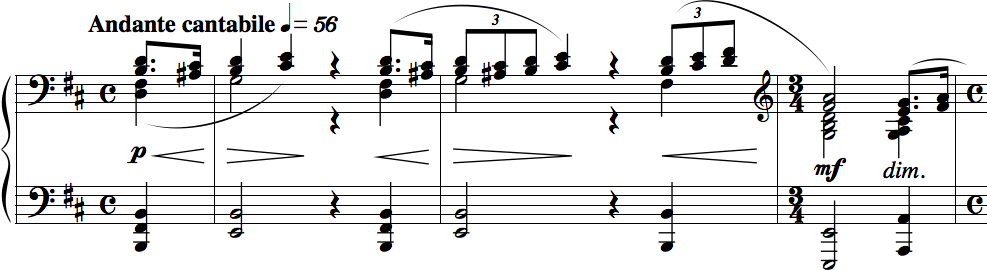
The entire Andante cantabile has low, dark, and thick melodies reminiscent of a funeral march.

The continual gauntlets of number two are relieved by the third piece in the set, an "introspective rêverie [daydream]." Drawing on the previous illustration of a "generic hybrid", this piece is described as a mixture between the song without words and funeral march genres, to create what is called the "most Russian" piece of the set, containing both sonorous bass and a solid melody, characteristics of Russian music.

Comprising only 55 measures, this piece is one of the shortest but has one of the longer playing times of about seven minutes (four and a half if the repeat is not taken). The piece is structured as a three-part form. The theme of the first and second sections are played entirely in minor thirds, accompanied by a left hand figure of open fifths and octaves. The third section has the melody in minor sixths, alongside a staccato octave bass. The lament of the opening theme transforms into an explicit funeral march as the left-hand octaves become regular.

=== 4. Presto, E minor ===
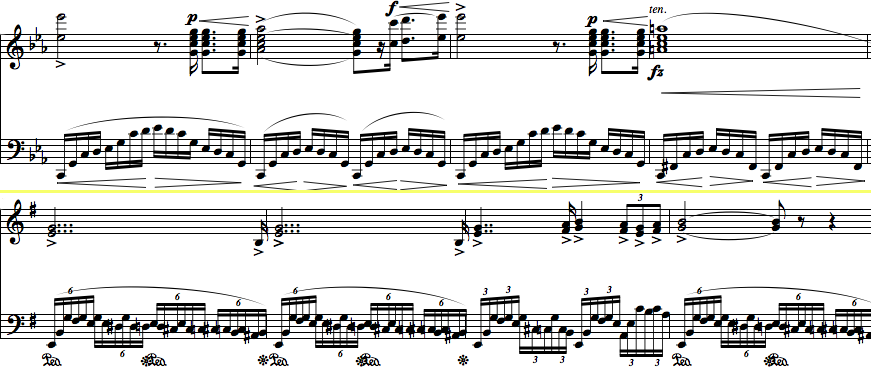
Revolutionary étude (Chopin, top) bears comparison to Presto in the continual left-hand figures and minimal melody.

The fourth piece is similar to the second in the quality of its performance. The fourth piece reveals resemblance to Chopin's Revolutionary étude in the taxing left hand figure place throughout. The piece is 67 measures long, with a duration of about three minutes, and has the fastest tempo of the set, Presto (quick) at = 104, and is the shortest work in terms of playing time.

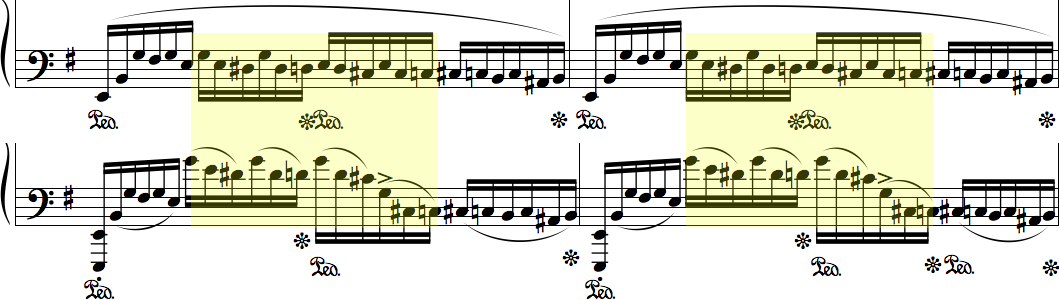
Left hand figure in opening Presto (top) and third section's Più vivo. The "registral displacement" (highlighted) alters certain notes in the familiar figure to increase tension. Listen

Presto is in ternary form with a coda. The piece begins with a fortissimo introduction with a thick texture in the left hand consisting of chromatic sextuplets. The melody is a "rising quasi-military" idea, interspersed between replications of the left hand figure, the mostly two-note melody being a strong unifying element. The middle section is a brief period of pianissimo falling figures in the right hand and rising scales in the left. The third section is marked Più vivo (more life) and is played even faster than the intro, = 112. At this point the piece develops a very thick texture, with the original left hand figure played in both hands in varying registers. The technique of rapidly changing the octave in which a melody is played, sometimes called "registral displacement", is used to present the figure in a more dramatic form that increases the intensity of the ending. The ending, a coda in Prestissimo (very quick), = 116, is a final, sweeping reiteration of the theme that closes in a heavy E minor chord, which revisits Rachmaninoff's preoccupation with bell sounds, prominent in his Piano Concerto No. 2 and Prelude in C♯ minor (Op. 3, No. 2).

The piece is a major exercise in endurance and accuracy: the introduction opens in a left hand figure requiring span of a tenth interval. Additionally, octave intervals invariably appear before fast sextuplet runs, making quick wrists and arm action necessary. The double melodies Rachmaninoff uses in this work exist purposely to "keep both hands occupied," obscuring the melody and making it difficult for the right hand to project. This is the only piece in the set with indicated pedal markings.

=== 5. Adagio sostenuto, D♭ major ===
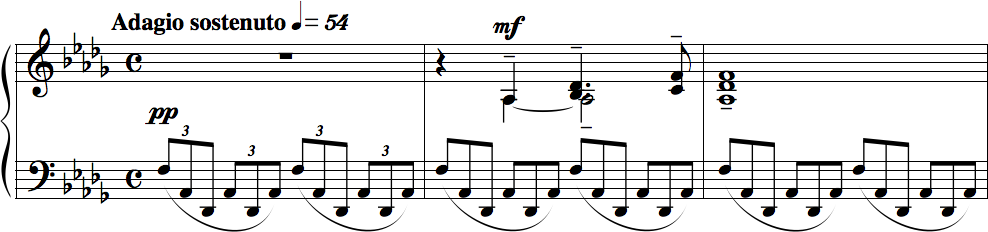
The left hand plays almost identical figures throughout Adagio sostenuto.

The piece is similar to the form of a barcarolle, a folk song with a rhythmic tuplet accompaniment. Playing it takes approximately five minutes, and it is 53 measures long, the shortest in terms of measures. It is an adagio sostenuto (sustained at ease) at = 54, with a simple melody presented in ternary form.

Lacking any prodigious figures or difficult runs, the piece displays Rachmaninoff's capability for musical lyricism. Although the piece seems simple, the mood must be sustained by playing simultaneously restrained but dynamic triplet figures in the left hand. The melody, a chordal texture with frequent suspended tones, creates a difficult task in voicing, and placing the correct emphasis on the correct notes. Its relatively short melody lines are a direct contrast to Rachmaninoff's characteristically long lines, giving a shorter time to bring out the phrases.

=== 6. Maestoso, C major ===
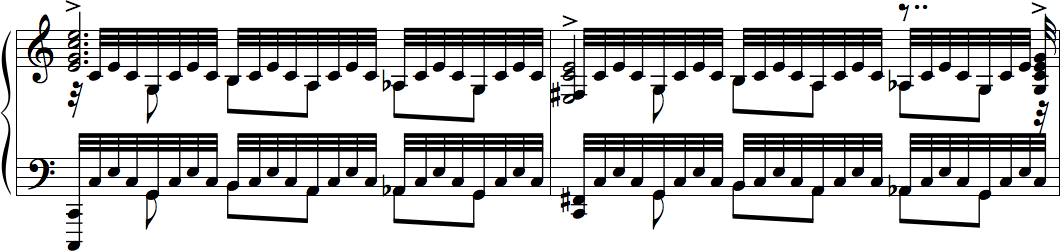
Maestoso is full of this thick texture, complicating the "challenging chordal melody".

The last piece in the set is a quintessential nineteenth-century work, and has been described as an "apotheosis or completion of struggle." It appears to be inspired by the texture in the Präludium from Schumann's Bunte Blätter. The piece was once summarized as:

The final piece or movement of a cycle that is virtuosic and brilliant, employing the entire range of dynamics and sonorities available to the piano, bringing a set of pieces to a glorious conclusion.

— Robin Hancock, Boston University, 1992

This "stormy, agitated" work contains a "vehemently triple-dotted main theme and only some brief midsection hazy sunshine [that lightens] the storm before fortississimo thunders return and finally dominate." Despite the dark imagery presented to describe the piece, the work is in C major, and the result is more light-hearted than dark, but not as triumphal as the Maestoso would make it sound.

Like the second and fourth pieces, number six is written in the form of an étude, with a repetitive but technically challenging chordal melody that is doubled in both hands. In all, the work has three distinct elements played simultaneously: the main melody, the continuous thirty-second note broken chord figures, and a descending eighth note motif. Dynamics play a large part in this piece: the fortissimo marked at the beginning is maintained all throughout the first section, with only brief respites to mezzo forte. The middle section is wholly softer, and contains two areas with significant mounting tension, creating the aforementioned "apotheosis effect" with dramatic "false starts." Here, the theme is manipulated contrapuntally to develop a canonic effect. This "triple counterpoint... is titanic both in size and impact, and in potential for disaster," referring to the tension, waiting for the final climax, in this "continuing explosion." Immediately before the coda, the thick texture and canon suddenly disappear and the piece becomes piano. Upon entering the coda, the work resumes the forte theme and amalgamates to a majestic ending played fortississimo.

Maestoso is one of the most difficult pieces in the set. Stamina and strength are required to sustain a full resonant sound, while the continuous thirty-second figure can be tiring for the pianist. Consistent tempo is a problem for this piece, due to the melody being interspersed with two other elements. Additionally, the dynamics, mostly forte and fortissimo, indicate that an accurate vision of relative volume is necessary. Maintaining this accuracy while managing every other element of the piece and successfully presenting a musically solid performance continues to be the ultimate challenge of all.

== Reception ==
The Six moments musicaux were well received by critics. During the writing of his Symphony No. 1, Rachmaninoff was distracted from solo piano work, and the Moments were regarded as his return to mature composition. Although revolutionary and grand in style, they retain the charm of his early works, as mentioned by pianist Elizabeth Wolff: "They are typical of his early works, dense, rich in counterpoint, highly chromatic, poignantly nationalistic, deeply felt, and of course, exceptionally challenging to the pianist." Later performances of this work would reveal that Rachmaninoff had hidden a subtle rhythm and vitality that emerged under the long, melodic phrases, furthering his acclaim as an incredibly complex musician. The Moments go as far as to "confirm the inexplicable inherent in genius", with "exquisite melody, wondrous harmonic changes, 'heavenly brevity'," while maintaining "a sense of contrast and variety that allows each miniature to stand alone while complementing the work on either side of it." Although it is unknown whether the financial reaction of this composition recouped his stolen money, the emotional reaction to it would be overshadowed for the following years by the catastrophic premiere in 1897 of his two-years' labor: the Symphony No. 1, Op. 13, 1895.
