= Russian Rhapsody =

Russian Rhapsody may refer to:

- Russian Rhapsody (film), 1944 cartoon directed by Robert Clampett
- Russian Rhapsody (Rachmaninoff), a composition by Sergei Rachmaninoff for two pianos
