= Symphonic Dances (Rachmaninoff) =

1940 orchestral suite composed by Sergei Rachmaninoff

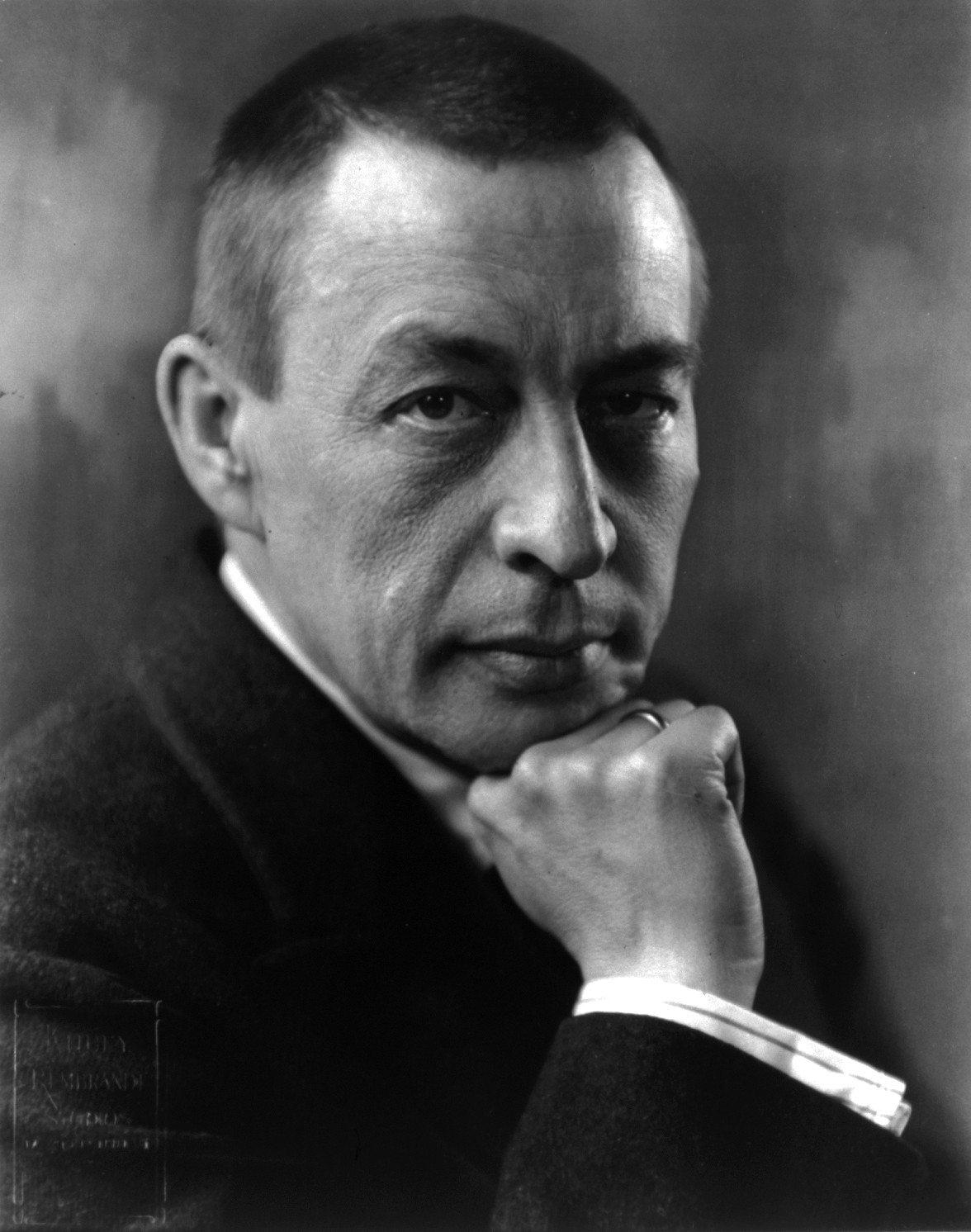
Sergei Rachmaninoff

Symphonic Dances, Op. 45, is an orchestral suite in three movements completed in October 1940 by Russian composer Sergei Rachmaninoff. The composer also published a version for two pianos. It is his final major composition, and his only piece written in its entirety while living in the United States.

The work allowed him to indulge in a nostalgia for the Russia he had known, as much as he had done in the Symphony No. 3, as well as to effectively sum up his lifelong fascination with ecclesiastical chants. In the first dance, he quotes the opening theme of his Symphony No. 1, itself derived from motifs characteristic of Russian church music. In the finale he quotes both the Dies irae and the chant "Blessed art thou, Lord" ("Blagosloven yesi, Gospodi") from his All-Night Vigil.

== Background ==
Rachmaninoff composed the Symphonic Dances four years after his Third Symphony, mostly at the Honeyman estate, "Orchard Point", in Centerport, New York, which overlooked Long Island Sound. Its original name was Fantastic Dances, with movement titles of "Noon", "Twilight", and "Midnight". While the composer had written to conductor Eugene Ormandy in late August 1940 that the piece was finished and needed only to be orchestrated, the manuscript for the full score bears completion dates of September and October 1940. It was premiered by Ormandy and the Philadelphia Orchestra, to whom it is dedicated, on January 3, 1941.

The work is representative of the composer's later style with shifting harmonies, outer movements in a manner similar to Sergei Prokofiev, and a focus on individual instrumental tone colors such as through the use of an alto saxophone in the opening dance, with this instrument encouraged by American orchestrator and composer Robert Russell Bennett. The opening three-note motif, introduced quietly but soon reinforced by heavily staccato chords, are responsible for much of the movement's rhythmic vitality.

The rhythmic vivacity, a characteristic of Rachmaninoff's late style, may have been further heightened in this piece following the success of his Rhapsody on a Theme of Paganini as a ballet in 1939 and wanted to write something with which to follow it up. He also may have included material intended for a ballet titled The Scythians, begun in 1914–15 but abandoned before he left Russia. No manuscript for the ballet is known to have survived, though he may have quoted the work.

The work also includes several quotations from Rachmaninoff's other works. The first dance ends with a modified quotation from his poorly received First Symphony (1897), rendered in a major key. The final dance introduces the Dies Irae theme, denoting Death, and a quotation from the ninth movement of his All-night Vigil (1915), representing Resurrection. The Resurrection theme proves victorious in the end (he wrote the word "Hallelujah" at this place in the score). The second dance was called "Dusk" in some sketches.

== Instrumentation ==
The work is scored for an orchestra of piccolo, 2 flutes, 2 oboes, cor anglais, 2 clarinets, bass clarinet, alto saxophone, 2 bassoons, contrabassoon, 4 horns, 3 trumpets, 3 trombones, tuba, percussion (timpani, triangle, tambourine, side drum, cymbals, bass drum, tamtam, xylophone, glockenspiel, and tubular bells), harp, piano, and strings.

== Movements ==
1. (Non) allegro (C minor – C major)
2. Andante con moto (Tempo di valse) (G minor)
3. Lento assai – Allegro vivace – Lento assai. Come prima – Allegro vivace (D minor – D major)

== Arrangements ==
=== Two pianos ===
Rachmaninoff wrote an arrangement for two pianos concurrently with the orchestral version. Though often referred to as an “arrangement,” since the piano version was completed in August 1940 and the orchestral version in October of the same year, there is ongoing debate as to whether the piano version should in fact be called an arrangement. This arrangement was first performed by the composer with Vladimir Horowitz at a private party in Beverly Hills, California, in August 1942.

=== Ballet ===
Rachmaninoff corresponded with choreographer Michel Fokine about possibly creating a ballet from the Dances. He played the composition for Fokine on the piano; the choreographer responded enthusiastically. Fokine's death in August 1942 halted this project.

In the 1980s, Joseph Albano choreographed the dances for the Albano Ballet in Hartford, Connecticut. In 1991, Salvatore Aiello choreographed the Symphonic Dances for the North Carolina Dance Theater. Peter Martins did so in 1994 for the New York City Ballet. Alexei Ratmansky choreographed Symphonic Dances for Miami City Ballet in 2012.Edwaard Liang did so in 2012 for the San Francisco Ballet. Liam Scarlett, as Artist In Residence choreographed the Symphonic Dances for The Royal Ballet, performed as part of a Quad billing at the Royal Opera House in Covent Garden, London, in 2017.

=== Two organs ===
There exists a transcription of the entire piece by French composer/performer Jean Guillou, written for two organs.

=== Piano solo ===
Pianist Inon Barnatan transcribed the work himself and recorded it in 2023. There also exists a recording of Rachmaninoff playing through the piano reduction for Eugene Ormandy, during which he sings, whistles and talks about how he thinks the Dances should be performed. Rachmaninoff played the first movement coda differently from the score; these minor changes were reproduced by the pianist Stephen Kovacevich when he performed the work with Martha Argerich at his 75th birthday concert at Wigmore Hall.

=== Chamber orchestra ===
British composer and arranger Iain Farrington has arranged the work for a chamber orchestra consisting of fifteen musicians.

== Recordings ==
- Eugene Ormandy, conducting the Philadelphia Orchestra
- Dimitri Mitropoulos, conducting the New York Philharmonic (1942)
- Nikolai Golovanov, conducting the USSR State Radio Symphony Orchestra, (1944 – 1st and 3rd movements, 1949 – 2nd movement)
- Yevgeny Svetlanov, conducting the State Academic Symphony Orchestra of the Russian Federation
- Kirill Kondrashin, conducting the Moscow Philharmonic Orchestra
- Kirill Kondrashin, conducting the Concertgebouw Orchestra (Concertgebouw, 1976)
- Mariss Jansons, conducting the Saint Petersburg Philharmonic Orchestra
- Yuri Temirkanov, conducting the Saint Petersburg Philharmonic Orchestra
- André Previn, conducting the London Symphony Orchestra
- Vladimir Ashkenazy, conducting the Concertgebouw Orchestra
- Lorin Maazel, conducting the Berlin Philharmonic
- Sergiu Comissiona, conducting the Vancouver Symphony Orchestra
- Eiji Oue, conducting the Minnesota Orchestra
- Predrag Gosta, conducting the London Symphony Orchestra
- Enrique Bátiz, conducting the Royal Philharmonic Orchestra
- Robert Spano, conducting the Atlanta Symphony Orchestra
- Donald Johanos, conducting the Dallas Symphony Orchestra
- Eugene Goossens, conducting the London Symphony Orchestra
- Simon Rattle, conducting the Berlin Philharmonic
- Martha Argerich and Nelson Goerner, at Edinburgh International Festival 2011 (version for two pianos)
- Nina Schumann and Luis Magalhães, TwoPianists Records (version for two pianos)
- Valery Gergiev, conducting the London Symphony Orchestra
- Semyon Bychkov, conducting the WDR Symphony Orchestra Cologne
- Valery Polyansky, conducting the State Symphony Capella of Russia
- Charles Mackerras, conducting the Royal Liverpool Philharmonic
- Erich Leinsdorf, conducting the Rochester Philharmonic Orchestra
- Leonard Slatkin, conducting the Detroit Symphony Orchestra
- Vladimir Ashkenazy and André Previn, Decca Records (version for two pianos)
- Martha Argerich and Nelson Freire, at Salzburg Festival 2009 (version for two pianos)
- Yannick Nézet-Séguin, conducting the Philadelphia Orchestra, 2021
- John Eliot Gardiner, conducting the NDR Sinfonieorchester, 1995
- Vasily Petrenko, conducting the Royal Liverpool Philharmonic in 2008

== Notes ==
=== Sources ===
- Harrison, Max (2006). Rachmaninoff: Life, Works, Recordings. London: Continuum International Publishing Group. ISBN 0-8264-9312-2.
- Maes, Francis (2002). A History of Russian Music: From Kamarinskaya to Babi Yar. Translated by Arnold J. Pomerans; Erica Pomerans. Berkeley, Los Angeles, London: University of California Press. ISBN 0-520-21815-9.
- Norris, Gregory (1980). Stanley Sadie (ed.). The New Grove Dictionary of Music and Musicians (20 vols.) (2nd ed.). London: Macmillan. ISBN 0-333-23111-2.
- Schonberg, Harold (1985). The Virtuosi: Classical Music's Great Performers From Paganini to Pavarotti. Vintage Books. ISBN 0-394-75532-4.
