= Three Russian Songs, Op. 41 (Rachmaninoff) =

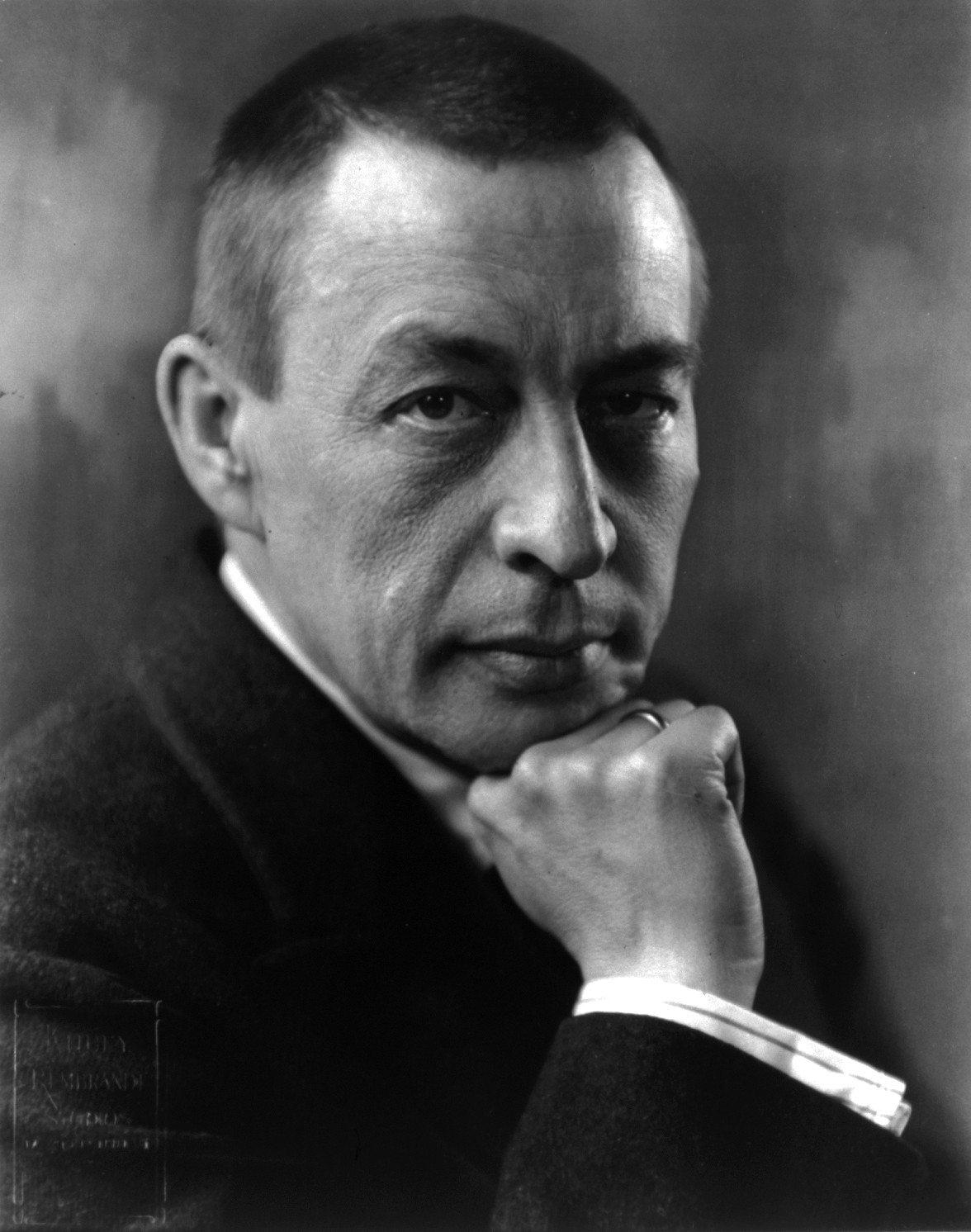
Sergei Rachmaninoff in 1921

The Three Russian Songs, Op. 41 (Trois Chansons Russes; Tri Russkie Pesni) for chorus and orchestra (also seen as Three Russian Folk Songs) were written by Sergei Rachmaninoff in 1926. It is the last of Rachmaninoff's three works for chorus and orchestra, the others being the cantata Spring, Op. 20 (1902), and the choral symphony The Bells, Op. 35 (1913). The work takes about 15 minutes to perform.

The thematic material for the work came from three traditional folk songs:

- Через речку, речку (Cherez rechku; Across the River, Swift River), Moderato, was a song Rachmaninoff had probably heard for the first time by the touring Moscow Art Theatre's opera studio a year or so before
- Ах ты, Ванька (Akh ty, Vanka; Ah, You Vanka! You Devil-May-Care Fellow), Largo, had been sung to him by Feodor Chaliapin
- Белилицы, румяницы, вы мои (Belilitsy, rumyanitsy, vy moi; You, My Fairness, My Rosy Cheeks), Allegro moderato, was a favourite of Nadezhda Plevitskaya.

The Three Russian Songs were dedicated to Leopold Stokowski, who conducted the first performance in Philadelphia on 18 March 1927 with the Philadelphia Orchestra and the Toronto Mendelssohn Choir. The program also included the world premiere of Rachmaninoff's Fourth Piano Concerto, with the composer as soloist. The Three Russian Songs were favourably received by the critics, the concerto less so. The pair of works was repeated on 19 March, and given in New York on 22 March, with similar critical reactions.

The songs are scored for altos and basses only, and they sing mostly in unison. The orchestration is quite extensive, although all the instruments rarely play simultaneously: piccolo, 2 flutes, 2 oboes, English horn, 2 clarinets, bass clarinet, 2 bassoons, contrabassoon, 4 horns, 3 trumpets, 2 trombones, bass trombone, tuba, percussion, harp, piano and strings.

It seems likely that the choir for the first three performances was augmented by local Russian Orthodox priests who could reach the bass notes required by Rachmaninoff. The conductor Igor Buketoff recalled that he attended the rehearsals as an eleven-year-old boy in the company of his father, a priest and a friend of Rachmaninoff's. The composer had asked the senior Buketoff to acquire the services of some of his fellow priests with basso profundo voices.

Buketoff also reports that Stokowski took the final song too quickly for Rachmaninoff's liking, but would not be persuaded to obey the composer's instructions. When Buketoff himself programmed the piece some years later as a choral conductor at the Juilliard School, he approached Rachmaninoff for advice as to the exact tempo he had envisaged.

The Three Russian Songs have been recorded several times, including by Leopold Stokowski himself, Igor Buketoff, Charles Dutoit and Yevgeny Svetlanov. The music has also been used as the basis of a ballet.
