= Symphony No. 1 (Rachmaninoff) =

1895 symphony by Sergei Rachmaninoff

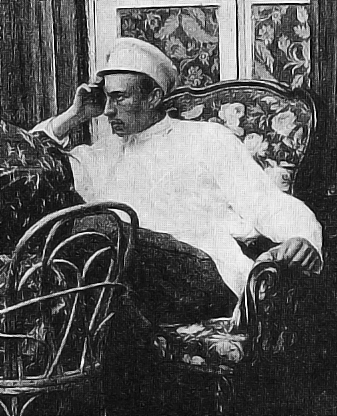
The failure of Symphony No. 1 was probably related to a subsequent psychological collapse that Rachmaninoff suffered a few months later; it haunted him until his death in 1943.

The Symphony No. 1 in D minor, Op. 13, is a four-movement composition for orchestra written from January to October 1895 by the Russian composer Sergei Rachmaninoff. He composed it at his Ivanovka estate near Tambov, Russia. Despite its poor initial reception, the symphony is now seen as a dynamic representation of the Russian symphonic tradition, with British composer Robert Simpson calling it "a powerful work in its own right, stemming from Borodin and Tchaikovsky, but convinced, individual, finely constructed, and achieving a genuinely tragic and heroic expression that stands far above the pathos of his later music."

The premiere, which took place in St. Petersburg on March 28, 1897, was an absolute disaster for reasons which included under-rehearsal and the poor performance by the possibly intoxicated conductor Alexander Glazunov. Rachmaninoff subsequently suffered a psychological collapse but did not destroy or attempt to disown the score. It was left in Russia when he went into exile in 1917 and subsequently lost. In 1944, after the composer's death, the separate instrumental parts of the symphony were discovered and were used to reconstruct the full score. The symphony's second performance took place at the Moscow Conservatory on October 17, 1945, conducted by Alexander Gauk. Following a general reassessment of Rachmaninoff's music, the First Symphony has been performed frequently and recorded several times.

== Background ==
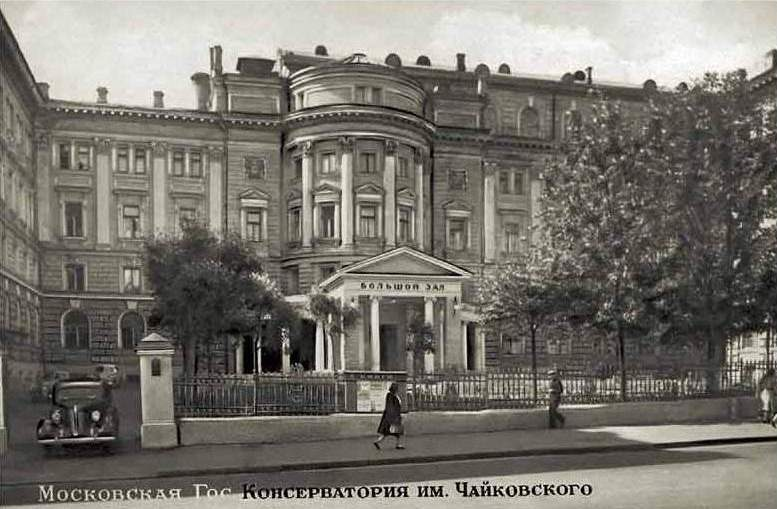
The Moscow Conservatory, where Rachmaninoff graduated with honors in the spring of 1891.

The First Symphony was actually Rachmaninoff's second attempt in the genre. During 1890–91, his final year at the Moscow Conservatory, he had been assigned by one of his composition teachers, Anton Arensky, to write a symphony as an exercise. Rachmaninoff later told biographer Oskar von Riesmann that he had completed the work; however, three of the four movements subsequently vanished. The single surviving movement, approximately 12 minutes in length, was published posthumously in 1947 as Rachmaninoff's Youth Symphony. This student work is written in traditional sonata form and modeled after the opening movement of Tchaikovsky's Fourth Symphony. Rachmaninoff added that neither Arensky nor fellow-professor Sergei Taneyev was enthusiastic about the work, perhaps because of its lack of individuality. The First Piano Concerto, which he wrote later in 1891, showed a better indication of his ability to handle large-scale musical forces, and his transcription (1894) of Tchaikovsky's Manfred Symphony into a piano duet gave him further exposure to the symphonic genre.

== Composition ==
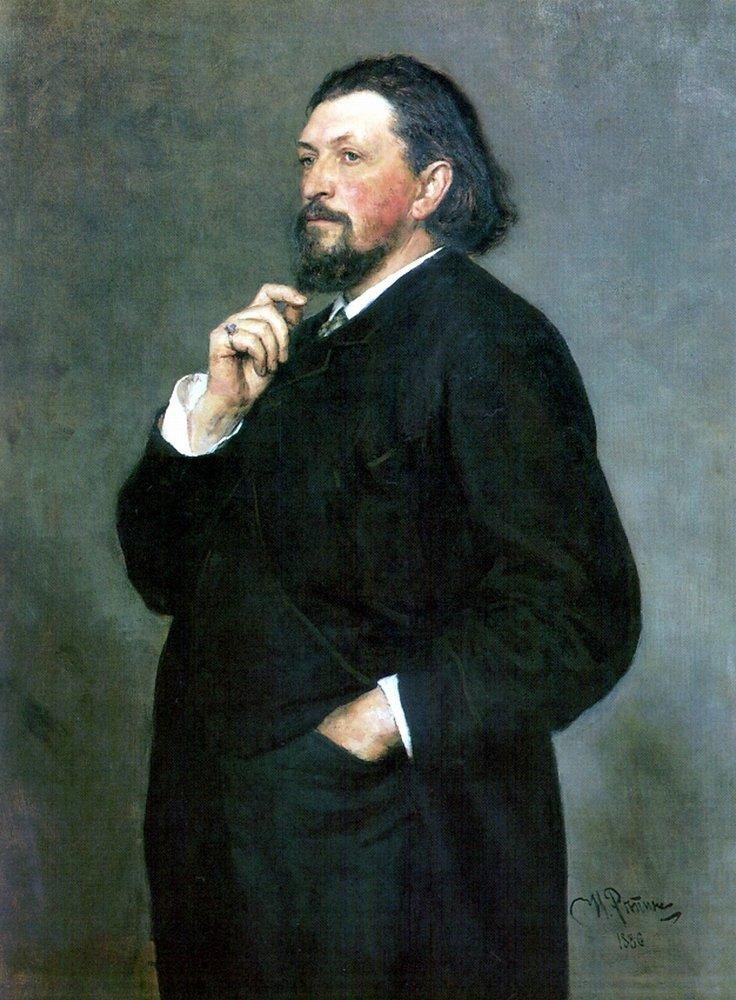
Portrait of Mitrofan Belyayev by Ilya Repin (1886)

Rachmaninoff began planning what would become his First Symphony in September 1894, after he had finished orchestrating his Caprice Bohémien. He composed the symphony between January and October 1895, which was an unusually long time for Rachmaninoff to spend on a composition; the project had proved to be extremely challenging. Writing from Ivanovka on July 29, he complained that, despite seven-hour days, progress was exceptionally slow. Those daily work schedules had increased to ten hours a day by September, and the symphony was completed and orchestrated before Rachmaninoff left Ivanovka on 7 October.

The atypical length of time Rachmaninoff had needed to compose the symphony was followed by delays in getting it performed. In 1895 he had met the musical philanthropist Mitrofan Belyayev, whose interest in programming a piece of Rachmaninoff's music had led to a performance of the tone poem The Rock at the Russian Symphony Concerts in St. Petersburg. In 1896, encouraged by Taneyev and Glazunov, Belyayev agreed to program Rachmaninoff's symphony the following year. However, when Rachmaninoff played the symphony at the piano for Taneyev, the elder composer complained: "These melodies are flabby, colorless – there is nothing that can be done with them." Rachmaninoff made numerous changes to the score, but was still dissatisfied. After further advice from Taneyev he made further amendments, including expansion of the slow movement.

== Description ==
The symphony is scored for 3 flutes (3rd doubling piccolo), 2 oboes, 2 clarinets in B♭, 2 bassoons, 4 horns in F, 3 trumpets in B♭, 3 trombones, tuba, timpani, cymbals, bass drum (movements 1, 2 and 4 only), triangle (movements 2 and 4 only), snare drum, tambourine, tam-tam (movement 4 only) and strings.

A typical performance has an approximate duration of 45 minutes.

=== I. Grave—Allegro non troppo (D minor) ===
I. Grave—Allegro non troppo
Sample of opening from the 1st movement.

A short introduction (just seven bars), gives the tone to the work: strong, fierce, and brave. In it two motivic items are presented which will establish the cyclic material for the entire composition: a note cell preceded by a grupetto and theme derived from the medieval Dies Irae plainchant. The latter becomes the prevailing theme in the Allegro, developed and enriched by orchestral figures based on Tchaikovsky.

The second theme (Moderato), in the violins, is interesting in its melodic structure, which uses the gypsy scale (with two augmented seconds). It is also harmonically unusual because of its ambiguous tonality. This theme is repeated by the whole orchestra in a sudden and powerful fortissimo, which leads to the first theme climaxing in a brass chorale. At the beginning of the repetition, the cell-grupetto reappears insistently.

=== II. Allegro animato (F major) ===
II. Allegro animato
Sample from the 2nd movement

The second movement is a fantastic scherzo which also begins with the cell-grupetto as well as a reminiscence of the Dies Irae, at least its first notes. The movement's main theme is a short melody, that we hear alternatively under its original form and its inversion, but the latter only appears briefly and episodically, spaced out by call signals and shudders of the orchestra which constitute an expressive background. In the central part, the cell-grupetto comes back again, giving birth to a new theme which is repeated by a solo violin for a few bars, in a gypsy air.

=== III. Larghetto (B♭ major) ===
III. Larghetto
Sample of opening from the 3rd movement

In the lyric calm of this movement, even the grupetto seems to have lost its menacing tension. The clarinet sings an easy and soft melody, but in the middle some storms appear with the gloomy harmonies of the muted horns. The theme, repeated, is ornamented with repetitive appoggiatura and counterpoint.

=== IV. Allegro con fuoco (D major) ===
IV. Allegro con fuoco
Sample of opening from the 4th movement

The cell-grupetto again gives the final movement a faltering violence. The brass instruments and a march rhythm start a theme based, once more, on the Dies Irae.

A calm con anima passage follows with a melody in the violins which goes quickly to high notes. Brass instruments take a prominent role followed by a new change in the central part (Allegro mosso), introduced by repeated notes in the low strings. The rhythm is especially interesting, with its soft syncopation (related to a binary rhythm in a ternary bar): repeated accompaniment from the scherzo appears in the second part and the return of the grupetto relaunches the movement with its dynamic and orchestral violence. A tam-tam hit follows the coda, at the end of which the grupetto, played by the strings in a slower time, is repeated with a prophetic insistence, strengthened by the brass and percussion instruments.

Despite the uneven quality of the composition itself, there is no doubt that the First Symphony is powerful and dramatic. It is influenced by Tchaikovsky's last symphonies, although this influence can only be seen in the feeling of anguish against relentless fate.

== Form ==
The composer Robert Simpson regarded Rachmaninoff's First Symphony as much superior to the two that followed it, feeling that it had been created "naturally and without strain" on the whole and with all four of its movements "thematically genuinely integrated." He also felt the symphony sidesteps what he called the "lyrical inflation" and "forced climaxes" of the Second Symphony and the piano concertos. Instead of this lyric inflation, as Robert Walker pointed out, a person could chart an increasing brevity and concision in Rachmaninoff's orchestral compositions in the works he completed after graduating from the Moscow Conservatory—in other words, from Prince Rostislav to The Rock and from The Rock to the symphony. Simpson essentially agreed about this musical economy, commenting that the symphony's structure as a whole could not be faulted. While Rachmaninoff did have a habit of relaxing into a slower tempo with the second subject of his first movement (a habit at which, Simpson claimed, Rachmaninoff became much worse later in his career), he kept a firm grip on the corresponding material in this work. Simpson especially cited the last movement's climax as overwhelmingly powerful and extremely economical in the use of its musical material.

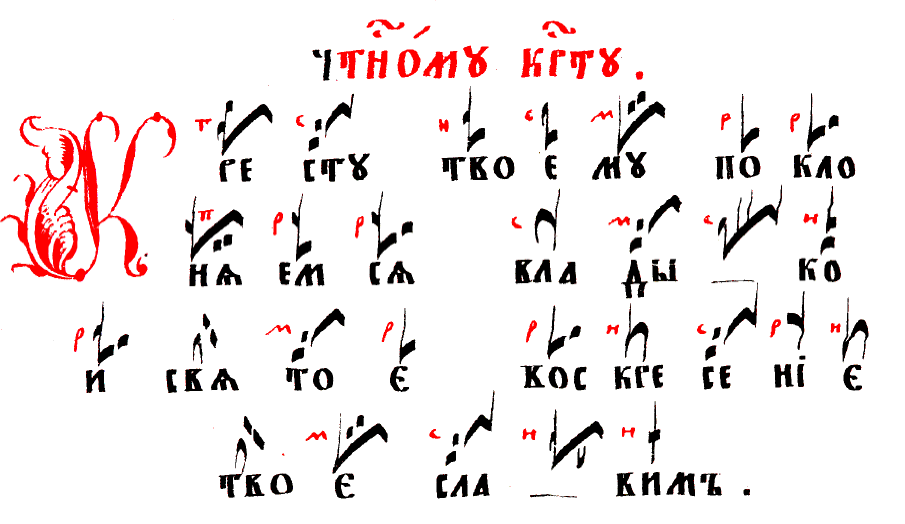
An example of Znamenny notation with so-called "red marks", Russia, 1884. "Thy Cross we honour, oh Lord, and Thy holy Resurrection we praise."

Rachmaninoff biographer Max Harrison writes, "The most original element in this work comes from a network of motivic relationships," adding that while the composer had employed this network in his Caprice Bohémien, he takes its use still further in the symphony. The result is that, while the symphony is a fully cyclic work, the level of thematic integration is taken far more extensively than in most Russian symphonies. As musicologist Dr. David Brown points out, "Themes and thematic fragments from earlier movements are transformed, sometimes profoundly, to help shape existing material as well as to generate new material." In taking the level of thematic integration thus far, Rachmaninoff was able to use comparatively little musical material to combine all four movements. César Cui may have complained of exactly this quality when he wrote about the "meaningless repetition of the same short tricks," but motivic analysts who have since studied the symphony have considered these "tricks" a compositional strength, not a weakness.

Harrison writes that these same motivic analysts lay claim to the First Symphony as proof "that Rachmaninoff could write genuinely symphonic music rather than the ballets squeezed into sonata shapes written by many Russian composers, from Tchaikovsky to Stravinsky." Harrison adds that Rachmaninoff's treatment of symphonic form might for this reason be more closely descended from Alexander Borodin, a point the St. Petersburg critics may have either failed to notice or ignored at the work's premiere. Another original idea of Rachmaninoff's, as pointed out by Harrison, was his "use of Znamenny Chants (знаменный распев) as the source of thematic ideas." While the material Rachmaninoff derives from them occasionally lends a decidedly religious air, he never quotes these chants literally. They resemble what Béla Bartók would call "imaginary folk music"—formally composed music that closely resembles folk music due to his complete absorption of the spirit and musical syntax of Eastern European folk song and dance.

Some analysts such as Rachmaninoff scholar Geoffrey Norris mention that the symphony also has its problems. The slow movement lapses into a static central episode referring back to the motto theme and the scherzo becomes depleted of rhythmic drive by rambling, repeating repetitions of the same theme. The symphony's clogged and sometimes brash orchestration can make the work sound portentous, though an attentive performance can make the symphony a dark, forceful and rapturous musical statement by helping clarify the orchestration and minimize the potential pitfalls in that area."

== First performance ==
=== Glazunov ===
Nikolai Rimsky-Korsakov, whose own musical preferences in the later years of his career were not overly progressive, may have sounded an advance warning on hearing the symphony in rehearsal when he told Rachmaninoff, "Forgive me, but I do not find this music at all agreeable." As the elder statesman of Russian music after Tchaikovsky's death, Rimsky-Korsakov may have felt justified saying something to Rachmaninoff, but he may have said it for the wrong reason. By the reports of many present, the rehearsal that Rimsky-Korsakov had heard, conducted by his friend and musical protégé Glazunov, was both a disaster as a performance and a horrific travesty of the score.

Though Glazunov loved to conduct, he never totally mastered the craft, despite Rimsky-Korsakov's claims in his memoirs to the contrary. The elder composer's comments on Glazunov's initial appearances as a conductor may in fact have been accurate for this occasion as well: "Slow by nature, maladroit and clumsy of movement, the maestro, speaking slowly and in a low voice, manifestly displayed little ability either for conducting rehearsals or for swaying the orchestra during concert performances." Not only did Glazunov conduct badly during the rehearsal of the First Symphony, but he also made cuts in the score and several changes in orchestration. The cuts he made in the first two movements made little sense musically, and his poor use of rehearsal time was complicated by the fact that two other works were receiving their first performances at the same concert. Harrison mentions that Rachmaninoff was concerned and tried talking to him during breaks in the rehearsal but to no effect.

Glazunov premiered the symphony on March 28 (March 16 o.s.), 1897. The performance was a complete failure; Rachmaninoff himself left in agony before it was over. Conductor Alexander Khessin, who attended the premiere, remembered, "The Symphony was insufficiently rehearsed, the orchestra was ragged, basic stability in tempos was lacking, many errors in the orchestral parts were uncorrected; but the chief thing that ruined the work was the lifeless, superficial, bland performance, with no flashes of animation, enthusiasm or brilliance of orchestral sound."

Moreover, Natalia Satina, who became Rachmaninoff's wife, later claimed, along with other witnesses, that Glazunov may have been drunk on the podium. One person in particular wrote that at the rehearsal he was "standing motionless on the conductor's rostrum, wielding his baton without animation." Rachmaninoff was obviously very concerned and in the pauses went to Glazunov and said something to him, but he never managed to arouse him from a state of complete indifference. Although Rachmaninoff never echoed this claim of inebriation and the charge itself cannot be confirmed, it is also not implausible considering Glazunov's reputation for alcohol. As reportedly told later by his pupil Dmitri Shostakovich and echoed in the New Grove, Glazunov kept a bottle of alcohol hidden behind his desk at the St. Petersburg Conservatory, sipping it through a tube during lessons.

Drunk or not, Glazunov may have neither understood nor been totally committed to the symphony, as it was a composition in a newer, more modern idiom and greater length (approximately 45 minutes) than he might have expected. Nor was he apparently sympathetic to Rachmaninoff's music on the whole, commenting on another occasion, "There is a lot of feeling ... but no sense whatever." What makes this comment strange in itself is that Glazunov himself may have anticipated Rachmaninoff's musical style in his own Second Symphony, which he had written in 1886. (Glazunov later demonstrated his low regard for Rachmaninoff's music by leaving a copy of the score for the Fourth Piano Concerto in a Paris taxicab in 1930. The score had been a present from the composer.) Nevertheless, it might be surprising that Glazunov had conducted a competent performance of Rachmaninoff's orchestral fantasy The Rock the previous year. While it was generally received favorably, César Cui stated, in a foretaste of his comments on the symphony, that "the whole composition shows that this composer is more concerned about sound than about music."

=== Contemporary response ===
==== Political bias ====
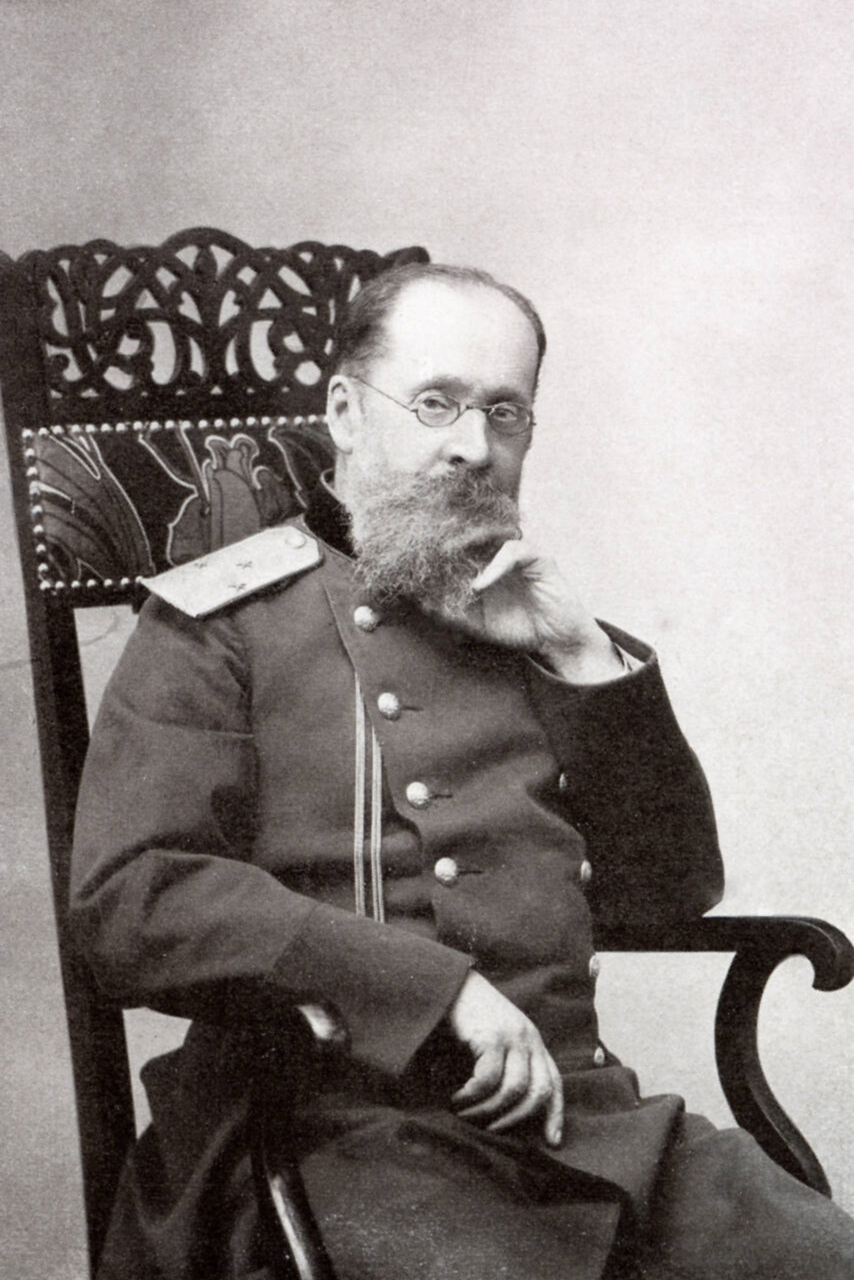
César Cui led the critical charge against the symphony.

For all of Belyayev's good intentions, having the First Symphony performed in St. Petersburg did not necessarily bode well, with Rimsky-Korsakov's comment merely serving as an omen of things to come. The St. Petersburg musical scene was dominated by a group of young composers called the Belyayev circle, headed by Rimsky-Korsakov since he had taught many of them at the Conservatory there. While Rimsky-Korsakov called the group "progressive" in his autobiography, musicologist Francis Maes suggests a better term for the group's focus might have been "moderately academic" as the majority of these composers turned technical accomplishment into an end in itself. This attitude, claims musicologist Solomon Volkov, had long typified the St. Petersburg Conservatory and the majority of its alumni.

The academic style of musical composition which resulted from this attitude, typified best in the works of Glazunov and Rimsky-Korsakov, became the preferred method of this group. If a composer wanted to be accepted into the Belyayev circle or receive Belyayev's patronage, he had to conform by writing musical works in this vein. This bias would continue to some point after Rimsky-Korsakov's departure with his son-in-law Maximilian Steinberg in charge of composition classes at the Conservatory through the 1920s, and Shostakovich would complain about Steinberg's conservatism, typified by such phrases as "the inviolable foundations of the kuchka" and the "sacred traditions of Nikolai Andreyevich [Rimsky-Korsakov]." Despite Rimsky-Korsakov's denial of the Belyayev circle being similar to The Five under Mily Balakirev, the two factions did share one trait. Like The Five, the Belyayev group viewed with suspicion those compositions that did not follow its canon.

==== Critical reaction ====
Much of what was written about the symphony may have been motivated by a long-standing antagonism between St. Petersburg and Moscow. There was also the fact it was a symphony in question this time—a musical form the St. Petersburg critics and many other members of the Belyayev Circle were very particular about defending. While critics in St. Petersburg had actually given good reviews to The Rock when Glazunov conducted it, a symphony was another matter.

Rachmaninoff's work may have been considered offensive because of its relatively progressive use of symphonic form; this could have gone against the critics' sensibilities as well as the precepts Rimsky-Korsakov taught at the Conservatory. Alexander Gauk, who would conduct the triumphant revival of the symphony in 1945, surmised as much, suggesting the work failed initially "because it was a modern composition, far ahead of its time, so it did not satisfy the tastes of the contemporary critics." The more partisan of these critics went on the attack, with Cui leading the charge:

If there were a conservatory in Hell, and if one of its talented students were to compose a programme symphony based on the story of the Ten Plagues of Egypt, and if he were to compose a symphony like Mr. Rachmaninoff's, then he would have fulfilled his task brilliantly and would delight the inhabitants of Hell. To us this music leaves an evil impression with its broken rhythms, obscurity and vagueness of form, meaningless repetition of the same short tricks, the nasal sound of the orchestra, the strained crash of the brass, and above all its sickly perverse harmonization and quasi-melodic outlines, the complete absence of simplicity and naturalness, the complete absence of themes.

Cui did give Rachmaninoff as close to a compliment as he would ever come, writing, "Mr. Rachmaninoff does avoid banality, and probably feels strongly and deeply, and tries to express these feelings in new forms." However, this olive branch was too obscured by the vitriol of the rest of the review for anyone to notice. Moreover, Cui's bias against Moscow composers was extremely deep-seated. In a letter to M.S. Kerzina dated December 19, 1904, he placed them together with Richard Strauss, "whose absurd cacophony will not be music even in the 30th century."

A more balanced consideration of the work, unfortunately too late to undo the damage wrought by Cui, came from critic Nikolai Findeisen in the April issue of Russkaya Muzykalnaya Gazeta:

The climax of the concert, Rachmaninoff's D minor symphony, was not very successfully interpreted, and was therefore largely misunderstood and underestimated by the audience. This work shows new impulses, tendencies toward new colors, new themes, new images, and yet it impresses one as something not fully said or solved. However, I shall refrain from expressing my final opinion, for it would be too easy to repeat the history of Tchaikovsky's Fifth Symphony, only recently [thanks to Nikisch] "discovered" by us, and which everyone now admires as a new, marvelous, and beautiful creation. To be sure, Rachmaninoff's first symphony may not be wholly beautiful, integrated and definite, but some of its pages seem far from mediocre. The first movement, and especially the furious finale with its concluding Largo, contains much beauty, novelty, and even inspiration...

==== Composer's reaction ====
Rachmaninoff wrote to composer Alexander Zatayevich on May 6 "of my impressions of the performance of the symphony ... though it is difficult for me." This letter has been cited frequently for the composer's opinion of Glazunov's lack of conducting skill. However, Rachmaninoff also writes extensively about his impression of the symphony itself:

I'm not at all affected by its lack of success, nor am I disturbed by the newspapers' abuse; but I am deeply distressed and heavily depressed by the fact that my Symphony, though I loved it very much and love it now, did not please me at all after its first rehearsal. This means, you'll say, that it's poorly orchestrated. But I am convinced, I reply, that good music can shine through poor instrumentation, nor do I consider the instrumentation to be wholly unsuccessful. So two surmises remain. Either, like some composers, I am unduly partial to this composition, or this composition was poorly performed. And this is what really happened. I am amazed—how can a man with the high talent of Glazunov conduct so badly? I speak not merely of his conducting technique (there's no use asking this of him), but of his musicianship. He feels nothing when he conducts—as if he understands nothing!... So I assume that the performance may have been the cause of the failure (I do not assert—I assume). If the public were familiar with the symphony, they would blame the conductor (I continue to "assume"), but when a composition is both unknown and badly performed, the public is inclined to blame the composer. This view would seem plausible, particularly as this symphony, though not decadent, in the current sense of the term, is really slightly "new." This means it must be played according to the most precise indications of the composer, who may thus somewhat make peace between the public and himself, and between the public and the composition (for the composition would then be more intelligible to the public)... As you see, at present I'm inclined to blame the performance. Tomorrow, probably, this opinion, too, will change. In any case I will not reject this Symphony, and after leaving it alone for six months, I'll look at it, perhaps correct it, and perhaps publish it, but perhaps by then my partiality for it will have passed. Then I'll tear it up.

Long after the fact, Rachmaninoff told his biographer Oskar von Riesemann, "I returned to Moscow a changed man. My confidence in myself had received a sudden blow. Agonizing hours spent in doubt and hard thinking had brought me to the conclusion that I ought to give up composing." However, the composer's comments to Zatayevich seem considerably more rational, even logical. Nor had the press been entirely unfavorable toward the symphony (see above). It may have been on subsequent reflection that Rachmaninoff suffered his psychological collapse.

As Harrison points out, "This delay in Rachmaninoff's collapse has never been, and presumably never will be, satisfactorily explained." One question some scholars have asked is whether the symphony had an autobiographical element that gave its failure a more personal dimension. According to many sources, the original manuscript, now lost, carried a dedication to "A. L." plus the epigraph to Leo Tolstoy's novel Anna Karenina, "Vengeance is mine; I will repay." A. L. was Anna Lodyzhenskaya, the beautiful Romani wife of his friend Peter Lodyzhensky. He had also dedicated the Caprice Bohémien to her. Whether Rachmaninoff's regard for her was merely infatuation or something more serious cannot be known. Neither can the connection between the two of them and Anna Karenina, or between the biblical quotation and the religious chants providing the basis for the symphony's thematic material.

When the collapse came, Rachmaninoff was left totally shattered. He had begun sketches for another symphony but now abandoned them and was unable to compose until 1900, when family members and friends convinced him to seek hypnotic therapy with Dr. Nikolai Dahl. The product of these meetings was the Second Piano Concerto, premiered in 1901. But during this period he focused on conducting and performing, so the time was not lost at all. One stroke of good fortune came from impresario Savva Mamontov, who two years earlier had founded the Moscow Private Russian Opera Company. He offered Rachmaninoff the post of assistant conductor for the 1897-8 season, which the composer accepted. He also acted as a soloist in many concerts.

== Neglect and disappearance ==
The symphony was not performed again in Rachmaninoff's lifetime. Although it is sometimes said that he tore the score up; he in fact did not, but he remained ambivalent towards the piece. In April 1908, three months after the successful premiere of his Second Symphony, he considered revising the First. He wrote to his Conservatory colleague Nikita Morozov that the symphony was one of three of his early works that he would like to see in a "corrected, decent form." (The other two compositions were the First Piano Concerto and Caprice Bohémien.) He wrote in 1910 to critic Grigory Prokofiev, "The symphony contains many successful passages insofar as its music is concerned, but the orchestration is worse than weak, a fact that caused its failure at the St. Petersburg performance." In 1917, in a letter to Boris Asafyev, he wrote that he would not show it to anyone and make sure in his will that no one would see it.

Before his departure from Russia, Rachmaninoff gave the key to his writing desk in his Moscow flat to his cousin Sofiya Satina; in it was locked the manuscript score for the First Symphony. He showed her the manuscript and asked her to look after it for him. Satina had the desk moved to her own flat, in the same building. It remained there until Satina emigrated from Russia in 1921. At that time, the manuscript passed into the care of the family housekeeper, Mariya Shatalina (née Ivanova). Shatalina died in 1925. All other manuscripts from Rachmaninoff's flat were moved by the state to archives of the Glinka Museum in Moscow, including the manuscript of the two-piano version of the symphony as well as some sketches for the work, but the manuscript score disappeared. The mysterious disappearance of the score has suggested to some that it may have been appropriated by an opportunist. Regardless of the exact circumstances, the manuscript score remains lost.

== Second life ==
While Rachmaninoff had kept the score of the First Symphony safely in his Moscow flat until the October Revolution, he had made no attempt to collect the orchestral parts in his haste to leave St. Petersburg in 1897. This fact would prove fortuitous in the symphony's ultimate fate. Shortly after the composer's death, in 1944, the instrumental parts of the symphony were discovered by chance in the Belyayev Archive of the Leningrad Conservatory Library. Using these parts and the two-piano arrangement, a group of scholars headed by prominent Russian conductor Alexander Gauk reconstructed the full score. The second performance of the piece, considered a success, took place at the Moscow Conservatory on October 17, 1945, conducted by Gauk.

The American premiere took place on March 19, 1948 at the Philadelphia Academy of Music, the Philadelphia Orchestra conducted by Eugene Ormandy. The work needed seven rehearsals. It was part of the first concert to be televised in the United States. With the posthumous rise in Rachmaninoff's reputation as a composer, the symphony became part of the standard orchestral repertoire.

The first British performance of the symphony took place on January 2, 1964, with the semi-professional Polyphonia Symphony Orchestra conducted by Bryan Fairfax. This was during a time when Rachmaninoff's music was held in low regard in the United Kingdom.

The first Australian performance was in 1985 in the Perth Concert Hall by the West Australian Symphony Orchestra, conducted by Vladimir Verbitsky.

== Popular uses ==
The theme from the symphony's fourth movement was used for a time during the late 1960s as the title music of the BBC television programme Panorama.

The symphony's premiere and Rachmaninoff's subsequent writer's block and hypnotherapy are the subject of Dave Malloy's 2015 musical Preludes; the score uses samples of the symphony and other works of Rachmaninoff's.

== Notable recordings ==
- Vladimir Ashkenazy conducting the Concertgebouw Orchestra
- Edo de Waart conducting the Rotterdam Philharmonic, another recording with Netherlands Radio Philharmonic Orchestra
- Mariss Jansons conducting the St. Petersburg Philharmonic Orchestra
- Andrew Litton conducting the Royal Philharmonic Orchestra
- Gianandrea Noseda conducting the BBC Philharmonic
- Eugene Ormandy conducting the Philadelphia Orchestra
- Mikhail Pletnev conducting the Russian National Orchestra
- André Previn conducting the London Symphony Orchestra
- Gennady Rozhdestvensky conducting the USSR Ministry Of Culture SO
- Leonard Slatkin conducting the St. Louis Symphony Orchestra
- Yevgeny Svetlanov conducting the Bolshoi Theatre Orchestra, another with the USSR Symphony Orchestra
- Walter Weller conducting the Suisse Romande Orchestra

== Sources ==
- Bertensson, Sergei and Jay Leyda, with the assistance of Sophia Satina, Sergei Rachmaninoff—A Lifetime in Music (Washington Square, New York: New York University Press, 1956)).
- Fay, Laurel, Shostakovich: A Life (Oxford and New York: Oxford University Press, 2000). ISBN 978-0-19-518251-4.
- Harrison, Max, Rachmaninoff: Life, Works, Recordings (London and New York: Continuum, 2005). ISBN 978-0-8264-5344-0.
- Maes, Francis, tr. Pomerans, Arnold J. and Erica Pomerans, A History of Russian Music: From Kamarinskaya to Babi Yar (Berkeley, Los Angeles and London: University of California Press, 2002). ISBN 978-0-520-21815-4.
- Martyn, Barrie, Rachmaninoff: Composer, Pianist, Conductor (Aldershot, England: Scolar Press, 1990). ISBN 978-0-85967-809-4.
- Norris, Gregory, Rachmaninoff (New York: Schirmer Books, 1993). ISBN 978-0-02-870685-6.
- Norris, Gregory, ed. Stanley Sadie, The New Grove Dictionary of Music and Musicians (London: Macmillan, 1980), 20 vols. ISBN 978-0-333-23111-1.
- Rimsky-Korsakof, Nicolai, tr. J. A. Joffe, My Musical Life (London: Faber, 1989) ISBN 978-0-8443-0024-5.
- Schwarz, Boris, ed. Stanley Sadie, "Glazunov, Alexander Konstantinovich," The New Grove Dictionary of Music and Musicians (London: Macmillan, 1980), 20 vols. ISBN 978-0-333-23111-1.
- Simpson, Robert, ed. Robert Simpson, The Symphony: Volume 2, Mahler to the Present Day (New York: Drake Publishers, Inc., 1972). ISBN 978-0-87749-245-0.
- Steinberg, Michael, The Concerto (Oxford and New York: Oxford University Press, 1998). ISBN 978-0-19-510330-4.
- Tranchefort, François René, Guía de la música sinfónica (Madrid: Alianza Editorial, 1989). ISBN 978-84-206-5232-0.
- Volkov, Solomon, tr. Bouis, Antonina W., St. Petersburg: A Cultural History (New York: The Free Press, a division of Simon & Schuster, Inc., 1995). ISBN 978-0-02-874052-2.
- Walker, Robert, Rachmaninoff (London and New York: Omnibus Press, 1980). ISBN 978-0-89524-208-2.
- Wilson, Elizabeth, Shostakovich: A Life Remembered, Second Edition (Princeton, New Jersey: Princeton University Press, 1994, 2006). ISBN 978-0-691-12886-3.
- Wooldridge, David, Conductor's World (London: Barrie and Rackliff, 1970) ISBN 978-0-214-66733-6.
- Yasser, Joseph, Progressive tendencies in Rachmaninoff's music (Tempo (New Ser.), Winter, 1951-2)
