= Prelude in B-flat major (Rachmaninoff) =

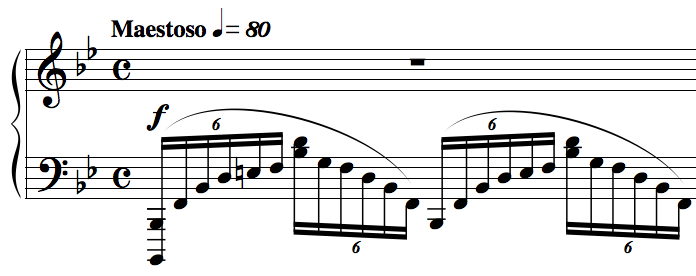
The Prelude begins with a rolling ostinato for the left hand.

The prelude in B♭, Op. 23 No. 2 as performed by Jareth Rader in April, 2014.

The Prelude in B♭ major, Op. 23 No. 2 is a composition by Sergei Rachmaninoff completed and premiered in 1903.

== Structure ==
This virtuoso piece is rhythmically complex, contrasting a thunderous left-hand ostinato against a jagged right-hand melodic line. As in Chopin's Revolutionary Etude, the performer must possess considerable left-hand endurance to maintain a consistent legato throughout the piece.

The structural form of the piece is ternary, roughly "ABA" with a coda. The main "idea" of the composition appears in measure 3:

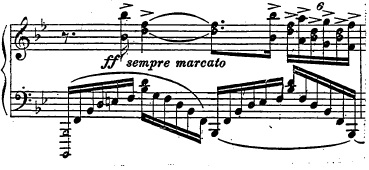
Measure 3

Here, the left-hand ostinato continues unimpeded as the treble line, accented and marked sempre marcato and fortissimo makes a regal entrance. By measure 20, the kernel of measure 3 is varied drastically, into a transcendent sequence that introduces an inner voice and offsets the main theme.

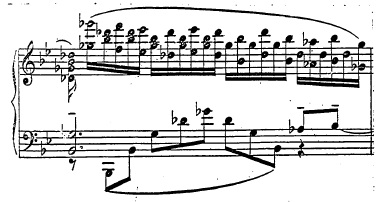
Measure 20

In measures 28–37, the Prelude transitions back to the main theme in a mini-encapsulation of classic first rondo form. The quasi-rondo section forecasts the return of the A section, which is in fact restated in measure 30, albeit disguised in a different key and form.

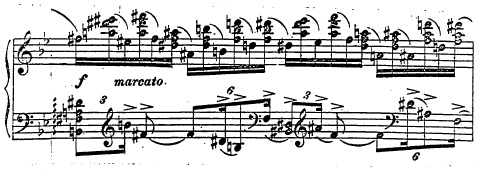
Measure 30

With the exception of measure 52, measures 38–54 are an exact repetition of the main theme. Measure 52 is pure Rachmaninoff: a vertigo-inducing cluster no doubt inspired by the composer's stupendous chord-playing technique.

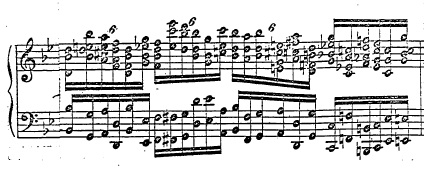
Measure 52

== Analysis ==
Much of the prelude is of a traditional harmonic nature. The modulation from B♭ major to D minor that occurs between measures 6 and 7 (and reappears at measures 14–15, 20–21, 41–42, and 49–50) is strongly characteristic of Rachmaninoff's music. In measure 7, Rachmaninoff reinforces the main theme by moving up a third to the dominant chord. The overall impression of the upward movement is a sense of elevation and grandiosity.

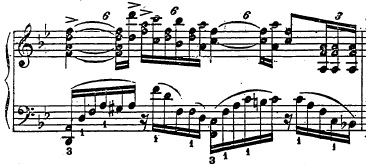
Measure 7

Much of the piece's structure is quite solid. For instance, in measures 21–27, a series of transient modulations occur around the circle of fifths. Brilliantly, these modulations transition into a much less-structured series of embellishments (the right hand embellishes the left-hand harmonic pattern with minor-second sequences) starting at measure 28.

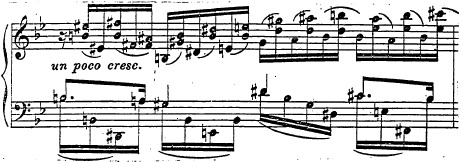
Measure 28

This kind of chromatic embellishment appears frequently in Rachmaninoff's later works, and is perhaps the composer's first use of this technique.

Texturally, the Prelude is homophonic. The main theme is perhaps a bit richer than the B section, where right- and left-hand accompaniments continue to outline chords around the second theme.

Slight variation, one of Rachmaninoff's hallmark compositional techniques, is employed throughout the prelude. For example, in measure 4, an intensification is created by very subtly changing the rhythm at the end of the phrase. Unusual rhythmic variation along the same lines is evident in measure 22:

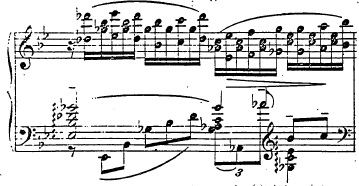
Measure 22

== Notable recordings and performances ==
David Oistrakh played an orchestral arrangement of this piece in a Soviet propaganda film of the 1950s.
