= Morceaux de salon, Op. 6 (Rachmaninoff) =

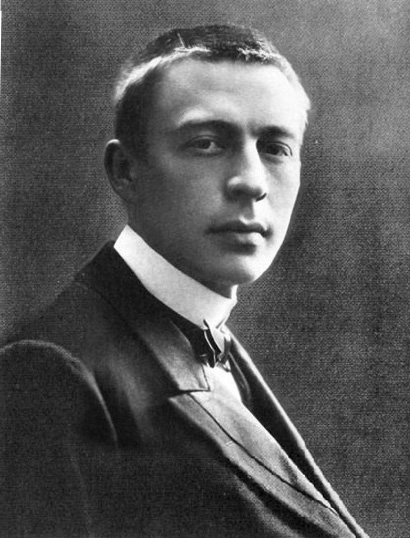
Sergei Rachmaninoff in 1892

The Morceaux de salon (Salon Pieces), Op. 6, are a set of two pieces for piano and violin composed by Sergei Rachmaninoff in 1893.

== History ==
The two Morceaux de salon were composed in the summer 1893, when Rachmaninoff was already established as a composer and pianist. His Morceaux de fantaisie, Op. 3, had already been published, and he had completed the Suite for two pianos, Op. 5. The Morceaux de salon are similar in scope and structure to the Pieces for cello and piano, Op. 2, which consists of a Prélude, and a Danse orientale. It is likely that they were dedicated to Julius Conus, whose son would later marry the daughter of Rachmaninoff.

== Structure ==
External audio
- Performed by Akiko Suwanai and Phillip Moll
- 1. Romance
- 2. Danse hongroise

The Morceaux de salon consists of a Romance and a Danse hongroise (Hungarian dance). Both pieces are written in D minor.

1. Romance
  The Romance begins with the main theme on the violin, underlined by flowing arpeggio piano accompaniment. In development, the theme is played in double stop octaves on the violin, with the piano writing also becoming fuller and more dramatic. The recapitulation leads to a short, passionate, cadenza on the violin, before concluding pianissimo in a D minor chord.
2. Danse hongroise
  In stark contrast to the Romance, the Danse hongroise, marked Vivace, is a brilliant and virtuosic show piece. At one point, the piano seems to echo an idea from the main theme of the Romance.

A performance takes approximately 11 minutes.

== Reception ==
Robert Matthew-Walker writes that "such is the composer's mastery of violin writing (though he may well have enlisted Conus's assistance in this regard) that one regrets that he did not leave a more extended work for the instrument".

== See also ==
- Morceaux de salon, Op. 10, a set of solo piano pieces
