= Scherzo in D minor (Rachmaninoff) =

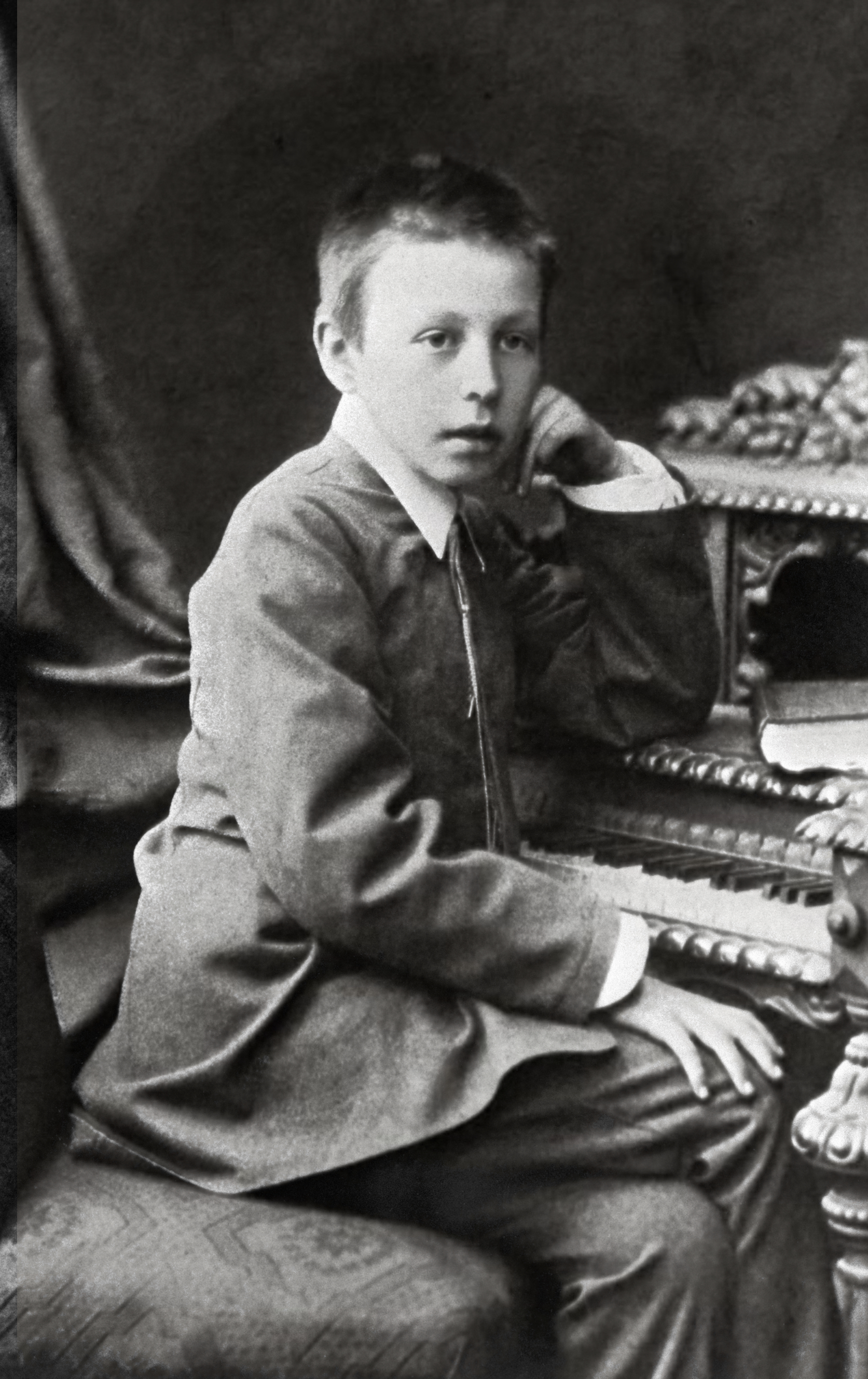
Sergei Rachmaninoff at age 10 in Saint Petersburg, Russia

Scherzo in D minor is Sergei Rachmaninoff's earliest surviving composition for orchestra, composed when he was a student at the Moscow Conservatory. The manuscript is dated 5–21 February 1888, when Rachmaninoff was still only 14. An unknown hand has changed this date to 1887. It is dedicated to his cousin Alexander Siloti, and it was intended to be part of a larger work because it is headed "Third movement".

The model for the work is the Scherzo from Felix Mendelssohn's incidental music for Shakespeare's A Midsummer Night's Dream. Rachmaninoff had earlier transcribed Pyotr Ilyich Tchaikovsky's Manfred Symphony for two pianos, and the Scherzo also has echoes of that work.

The first performance of the Scherzo took place in Moscow on 2 November 1945, conducted by Nikolai Anosoff, along with another early work by Rachmaninoff, Prince Rostislav. The Scherzo was published in 1947.

The piece is scored for 2 flutes, 2 oboes, 2 clarinets (B♭), 2 bassoons, horn (F), trumpet (B♭), 2 timpani, violins I, violins II, violas, cellos and double basses. It takes between four and five minutes to play.
