= Prince Rostislav (poem) =

Prince Rostislav (Князь Ростисла′в) is a poem by Alexey Konstantinovich Tolstoy first published in the April 1856 issue of The Russian Messenger (book 1, pp. 483-484), subtitled The Ballad.

The poem was based on an episode in Slovo o Polku Igoreve concerning Prince Rostislav of Pereyaslavl (1070-1093) and his brothers' losing a battle with the Polovtsy. Fleeting from the enemy, he drowned in the Stuhna River. The quotation from Slovo was used in a corrupt form, common at the time.

Later literary scholars found close similarities between this poem and Lermontov's Mermaid and Goethe's King Harald Garfager.

The poem was set to music twice, by Anton Rubinstein and Sergei Rachmaninoff.

== See also ==
- Prince Rostislav by Sergei Rachmaninoff.
