= The Bells (symphony) =

Choral symphony by Sergei Rachmaninoff

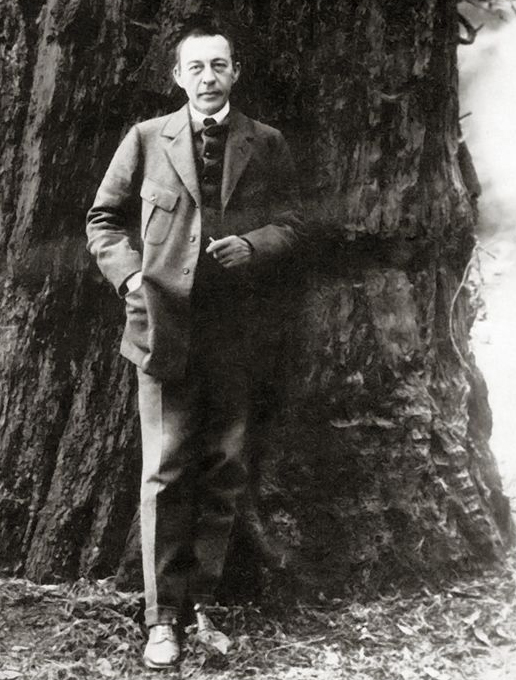
Sergei Rachmaninoff in front of a giant Redwood tree in California, 1919

The Bells (Russian: Колокола, Kolokola), Op. 35, is a choral symphony by Sergei Rachmaninoff, written in 1913 and premiered in St Petersburg on 30 November that year under the composer's baton. The words are from the poem The Bells by Edgar Allan Poe, very freely translated into Russian by the symbolist poet Konstantin Balmont. The traditional Gregorian melody Dies Irae is used frequently throughout the work.

It was one of Rachmaninoff's two favorite compositions, along with his All-Night Vigil and is considered by some to be his secular choral masterpiece. Rachmaninoff called the work both a choral symphony and (unofficially) his Third Symphony shortly after writing it; however, he would later write a purely instrumental Third Symphony at his new villa in Switzerland. Rachmaninoff dedicated The Bells to Dutch conductor Willem Mengelberg and the Concertgebouw Orchestra.

The US premiere of the work was given by Leopold Stokowski and the Philadelphia Orchestra and Chorus on 6 February 1920 and the UK Premiere by Sir Henry Wood and the Liverpool Philharmonic and Chorus on 15 March 1921.

== Composition ==
Rachmaninoff wrote to his friend Nikita Morozov in December 1906, asking whether he could think of a suitable subject for a choral piece to follow his cantata Spring. Nothing came of this request. However, while on a holiday in Rome, Italy early in 1907, Rachmaninoff received an anonymous letter containing a copy of Balmont's translation of The Bells. The sender asked him to read the verses, suggesting they were suitable for musical setting and would especially appeal to him. This suggestion was both extremely sensitive and opportune. It was only after the composer's death that the identity of the sender was found to have been Maria Danilova, who was then a young cello student at the Moscow Conservatory.

== Instrumentation ==
The Bells is scored for soprano, tenor, and baritone soloists, mixed choir, and an orchestra of piccolo, 3 flutes, 3 oboes, cor anglais, 3 clarinets, bass clarinet, 3 bassoons, contrabassoon, 6 horns, 3 trumpets, 3 trombones, tuba, percussion (timpani, 4 tubular bells, glockenspiel, triangle, tambourine, snare drum, cymbals, bass drum, and tamtam), pianino (upright piano), celesta, harp, organ (ad lib), and the standard strings of I & II violins, violas, cellos, and double basses.

== Movements ==
The four movements are marked:

1. Allegro ma non tanto: "The Silver Sleigh Bells" (Слышишь, сани мчатся в ряд) in A♭ major — with tenor solo
2. Lento: "The Mellow Wedding Bells" (Слышишь, к свадьбе зов святой) in D major — with soprano solo
3. Presto: "The Loud Alarm Bells" (Слышишь, воющий набат) in F minor
4. Lento lugubre: "The Mournful Iron Bells" (Похоронный слышен звон) in C♯ minor — with baritone solo

== Parallels to Tchaikovsky ==
Circumstantially and compositionally, The Bells draws parallels between its composer and his former mentor, Pyotr Ilyich Tchaikovsky. Rachmaninoff wrote the symphony in Rome, Italy at the same desk Tchaikovsky had used to compose. Compositionally, the four-movement mirroring of life from birth to death meant the finale would be a slow movement. In this and other ways, it is a counterpart to Tchaikovsky's Pathétique Symphony as well as to Gustav Mahler's 4th Symphony (starting with the comparison of the beginnings of both symphonies). Also some see the link between The Bells and Mahler's Das Lied von der Erde. The fourth movement, with its image of the demonic bell-ringer, hearkens to the bedroom scene in Tchaikovsky's The Queen of Spades.

== Translations ==
In his foreword to "Verses and Versions", Vladimir Nabokov seems to suggest that Rachmaninoff had, many years after composing the work, asked him to translate the Russian text into English, which may mean that Rachmaninoff was unaware the poem was originally written in English by Edgar Allan Poe. Nabokov seems to have been unaware that Rachmaninoff did, in fact, have an English translation of Balmont's Russian translation performed, by Fanny S. Copeland, in preparation for the 1920 publication by A. Gutheil. The necessity of performing an English translation of Balmont's text (as opposed to reverting to Poe's original) can be easily explained: given that Rachmaninoff's setting of Balmont is just as free as Balmont's translation of Poe, Poe's original text is highly incongruous with Rachmaninoff's musical setting. Rachmaninoff was unquestionably aware that the poem was authored by Poe and translated by Balmont, for he made these attributions in a letter to Marietta Shaginyan announcing the completion of the work.

== Bibliography ==
- Bertensson, Sergey and Jay Leyda, with Sophia Satina, Sergei Rachmaninoff: A Lifetime in Music (Bloomington: Indiana University Press, 2001) ISBN 978-0-253-33817-4.
- Maes, Francis, tr. Arnold J. Pomerans and Erica Pomerans, A History of Russian Music: From Kamarinskaya to Babi Yar (Berkeley, Los Angeles and London: University of California Press, 2002). ISBN 0-520-21815-9.
- Matthew-Walker, Robert, Rachmaninoff (London and New York: Omnibus Books, 1980). ISBN 0-89524-208-7.
- Norris, Geoffrey, Rachmaninoff (Oxford: Oxford University Press, 2001). ISBN 0-19-816488-2.
- Steinberg, Michael, Choral Masterworks (Oxford and New York: Oxford University Press, 2005). ISBN 978-0-19-512644-0.
