= Youth Symphony (Rachmaninoff) =

Unfinished symphony by Sergei Rachmaninoff

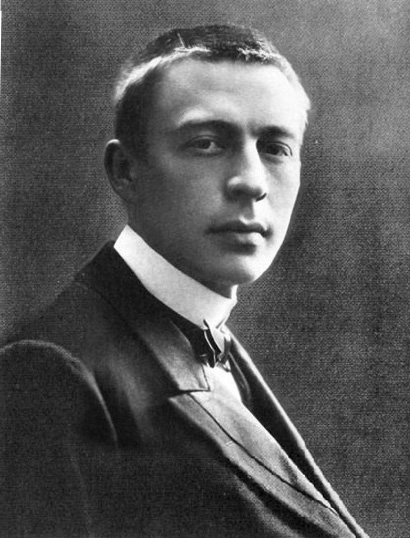
Sergei Rachmaninoff in 1892

The Youth Symphony in D minor is the first movement of a symphony written by Sergei Rachmaninoff, the score of which is dated September 28, 1891. It is the only movement of the work that was completed.

The score was published posthumously by Muzgiz in 1947.

== Structure ==
The composition, as it has survived, consists of a single movement marked Grave - Allegro molto and takes around 10 to 12 minutes to perform. The single-movement symphony is orchestrated with 2 flutes, 2 oboes, 2 clarinets, 2 bassoons, 4 horns, 2 trumpets, 3 trombones, 1 tuba, timpani, and strings.
