= Russian Rhapsody (Rachmaninoff) =

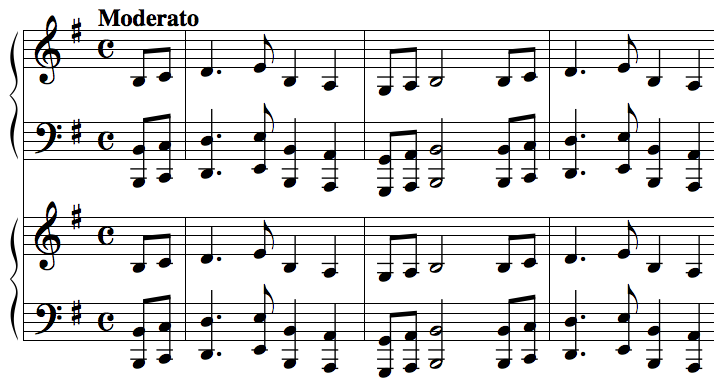
Introduction of the main theme

Russian Rhapsody is a piece for two pianos in E minor composed by Sergei Rachmaninoff in 1891, when he was 18 years old. It is more accurately described as a set of variations on a theme, rather than a true rhapsody. It was premièred on October 29, 1891, and its performance lasts approximately nine minutes.

== Background ==
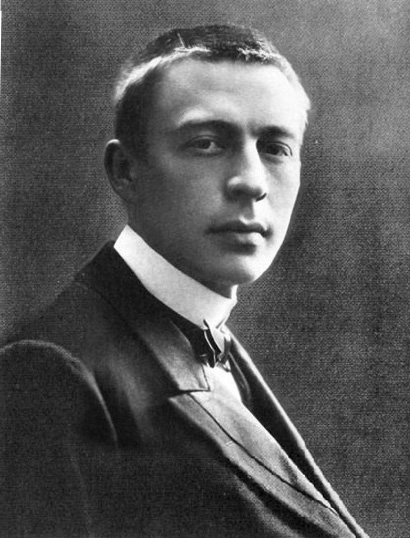
Rachmaninoff in 1892, after he graduated from the Conservatory

While still a student at Moscow Conservatory, Rachmaninoff wrote to Natalia Skalon on 22 January [O.S. 10 January] 1891 mentioning that he had begun work on a piece for two pianos that he wanted to play with his first cousin Alexander Siloti. He dated the manuscript January 12–15, 1891 [O.S., implying that he had the composition in his head at the time of the letter, and only recorded the days he notated it on paper.

Despite his stated intentions, he began rehearsing with Leonid Maximov, who had been a fellow student of Nikolai Zverev and pupil of Siloti, to play at a student concert at the Conservatory on March 8, 1891. However, Zverev, still upset over Rachmaninoff's request for a separate composing room, did not allow them to play together, so at the concert Rachmaninoff ended up conducting his choral work Deus Meus (1890) instead.

The Rhapsody received its first performance after he graduated, on October 29, 1891, played by Rachmaninoff and Josef Lhévinne at the Conservatory.

== Composition ==
The piece is more often described as a set of variations rather than a true rhapsody, and a letter from Rachmaninoff's friend Vladimir Wilshaw describes the possible origin of the composition as a session in which Rachmaninoff improvised on a melody set forth by pianist Yuri Sakhnovsky. Although both he and Lhévinne were more than capable performers, after the premiere, Rachmaninoff considerably simplified three passages. This is cited as the first of many future instances in which he would revise some of his pieces for no apparent reason, since it could not have been the ability of the performers that caused him to do so.

== Reception ==
It is natural for a composition of variations to repeat the theme, but it is noted that the Rhapsody lacks the textural contrast shown in his later works, although it is very virtuosic and brilliant.
