= Morceaux de salon, Op. 10 (Rachmaninoff) =

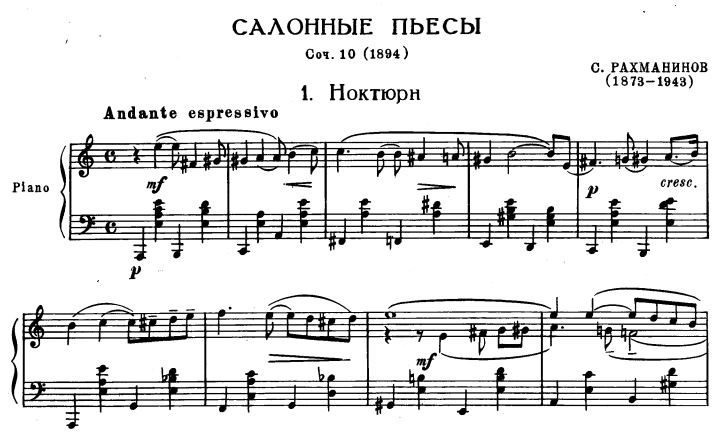
The beginning of the nocturne

The Morceaux de salon (French for Salon Pieces; Russian: Салонные Пьесы, Salonnyye Pyesy), Op. 10, are a set of pieces for solo piano composed by Russian composer Sergei Rachmaninoff in 1894.

== Individual pieces ==
"Humoresque" by Sergei Rachmaninoff as performed by Gareth Rader in April, 2014.

1. Nocturne in A minor (Ноктюрн, Noctyurn)
2. Waltz in A major (Вальс, Vals)
3. Barcarolle in G minor (Баркарола, Barkarola)
4. Mélodie in E minor (Мелодия, Melodiya)
5. Humoresque in G major (Юмореска, Yumoreska)
6. Romance in F minor (Романс, Romans)
7. Mazurka in D♭ major (Мазурка, Mazurka)

== See also ==
- Morceaux de salon, Op. 6, a set of two pieces for piano and violin

== Sources ==
=== Sources ===
- Cunningham, Robert E. (2001). Sergei Rachmaninoff: A Bio-bibliography. Santa Barbara: Greenwood Publishing Group. ISBN 978-0-313-30907-6.
