= The Rock (Rachmaninoff) =

Fantasia/symphonic poem by Sergei Rachmaninoff

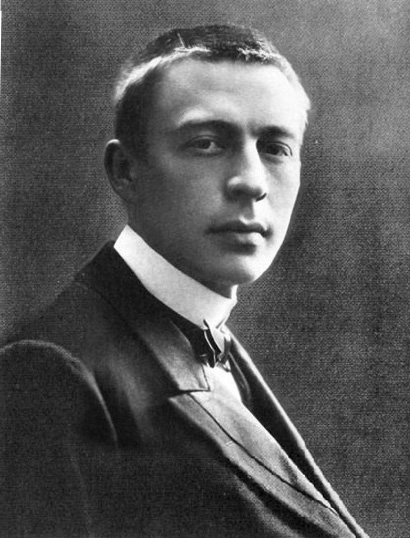
Sergei Rachmaninoff in 1892

The Rock, Op. 7 (or The Crag) (Russian: Утёс) (Utyos) is a fantasia or symphonic poem for orchestra written by Sergei Rachmaninoff in the summer of 1893. It is dedicated to Nikolai Rimsky-Korsakov.

== Inspiration ==
As an epigraph for the composition, Rachmaninoff chose a couplet from a poem by Russian poet Mikhail Lermontov:

The golden cloud slept through the night
Upon the breast of the giant-rock

He later admitted, however, to a second musical programme, drawn from a story by Anton Chekhov titled "Along the Way", in which a young girl meets an older man during a stormy, overnight stop at a roadside inn on Christmas Eve. The man shares with her the story of his life, beliefs, and past failures, as a blizzard rages on through the night.

== History ==
Rachmaninoff highly respected the older and accomplished composer Pyotr Ilyich Tchaikovsky, and in a meeting between the two at the home of Rachmaninoff's former teacher Sergei Taneyev, the younger composer was given the opportunity to perform his just completed piece at the piano. The Rock had a positive effect on Tchaikovsky, who had been discontented with an earlier performance of a four-hand piano arrangement of his latest symphony (the sixth) by another young composer, Lev Conus. The composer Mikhail Ippolitov-Ivanov recounted the event:

At the close of the evening [Rachmaninoff] acquainted us with the newly completed symphonic poem, The Crag. [...] The poem pleased all very much, especially Pyotr Ilyich [Tchaikovsky], who was enthusiastic over its colorfulness. The performance of The Crag and our discussion of it must have diverted Pyotr Ilyich, for his former good-hearted mood came back to him.

Tchaikovsky asked to be allowed to include The Rock in the program of a forthcoming European concert tour. This was never realized, however, as Tchaikovsky died later that year.

== Sources ==
- Brown, David. CD pamphlet: "Rachmaninoff: Symphony No. 2, The Rock -- Russian National Orchestra / Mikhail Pletnev". Deutsche Grammophon GmbH, Hamburg. 1994.
- Garcia, Emanuel E., Rachmaninoff's Emotional Collapse and Recovery: The First Symphony and its Aftermath. "Psychoanalytic Review". April 2004.
- Mann, William. CD pamphlet: "Rachmaninoff: Symphony No. 3, The Rock -- Stockholm Philharmonic Orchestra / Paavo Berglund". RCA Victor. Recorded June 20-22, 1988, in Philharmonic Hall, Stockholm.
