= Spring (Rachmaninoff) =

Cantata by Sergei Rachmaninoff

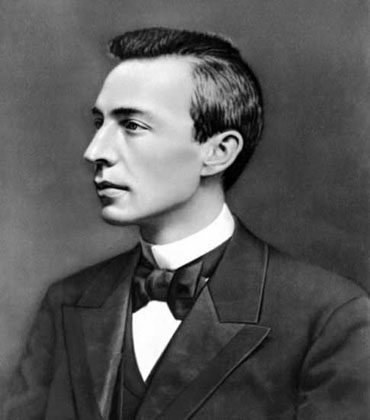
Sergei Rachmaninoff in the 1900s

Spring (Vesna), Op. 20, is a single-movement cantata for baritone, chorus and orchestra, written by Sergei Rachmaninoff in 1902. The work was finished after the famous Second Piano Concerto. Rachmaninoff intended to revise the cantata's orchestration but never did so.

== Programme ==
The work is based on a poem by Nikolay Nekrasov and describes the return of the Zelyoniy shum, or "green rustle". The poem tells of a husband who, fraught with murderous thoughts towards his unfaithful wife during the winter season, is ultimately freed from his frustration and choler by the return of spring.
