= Prince Rostislav (Rachmaninoff) =

Symphonic poem by Sergei Rachmaninoff

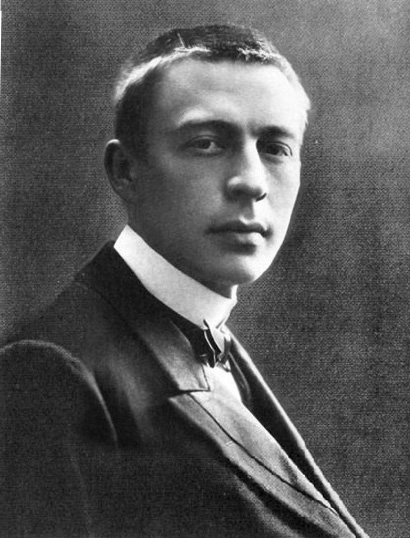
Sergei Rachmaninoff in 1892

Prince Rostislav is a symphonic poem by Sergei Rachmaninoff. It was composed when he was a student at the Moscow Conservatory, and is one of his earliest surviving compositions for orchestra. A typical performance of the work lasts from sixteen to twenty minutes.

It is written in D minor and uses the instruments in a personal way. Melodies are more individual and the orchestral textures are quite evocative. Prince Rostislav has echoes of Nikolai Rimsky-Korsakov's Sadko (second version, 1869).

The manuscript is dated 9–15 December 1891. The work is based upon an 1856 ballad written by Aleksey Konstantinovich Tolstoy, called Prince Rostislav.

Prince Rostislav is dedicated to Anton Arensky, who was one of his teachers at the conservatory. Rachmaninoff made no attempt to have the work performed during his life. The first performance of both Prince Rostislav and another early work, the Scherzo in D minor, took place in Moscow on 2 November 1945, conducted by Nikolai Anosoff. Prince Rostislav was published in 1947.
