= Morceaux de fantaisie =

1892 set of piano solo pieces by Sergei Rachmaninoff

Prelude op. 3, no. 2 (3:48)
played by Rachmaninoff himself for Edison Records in 1919

Morceaux de fantaisie (French for Fantasy Pieces; Russian: Пьесы Фантазии, Pyesy Fantazii), op. 3, is a set of five piano solo pieces composed by Sergei Rachmaninoff in 1892. The title reflects the pieces' imagery rather than their musical form, as none are actual fantasies. The set was dedicated to Anton Arensky, his harmony teacher at the Conservatory.

== Compositions ==
=== 1. Elegie in E♭ minor ===
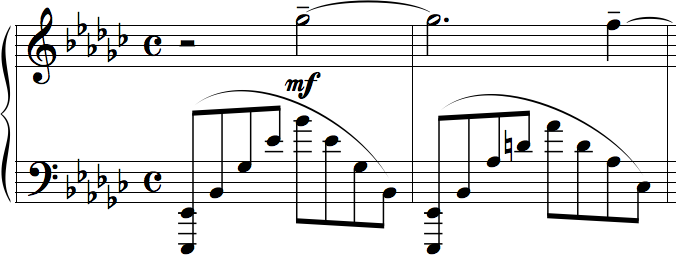
Elegie is a slower, more meditative piece compared to the others

Elegie (Элегия, Elegiya) is a musical elegy at moderato tempo.

=== 2. Prelude in C♯ minor ===
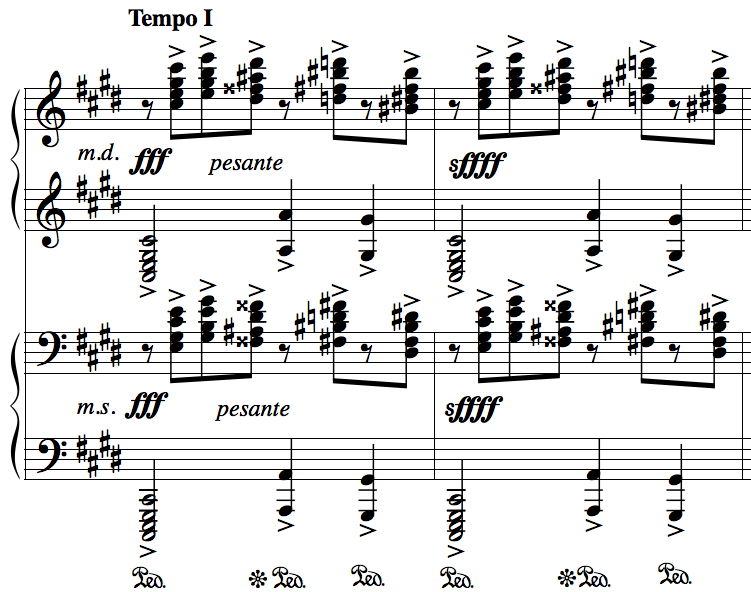
Prelude is famous for its theme and coda

The second piece, Prelude (Прелюдия, Prelyudiya) is the most famous of the set.

=== 3. Melodie in E major ===
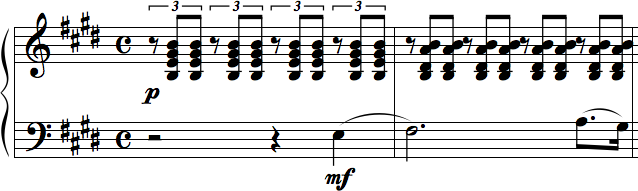
Melody is a short piece with a powerful climax

Melodie (Мелодия, Melodiya) is a short piece played Adagio sostenuto. It was rewritten by Rachmaninoff in 1940, along with the Serenade.

=== 4. Polichinelle in F♯ minor ===
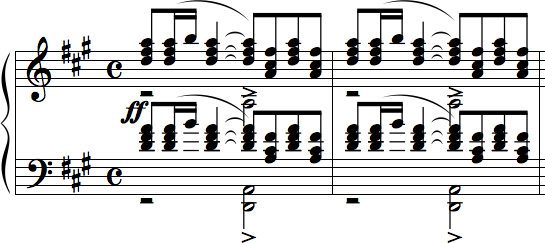
Polichinelle is both expressive and strong

The fourth piece, called Polichinelle (Полишинель, Polishinyelʹ), is in an ambiguous key although often referred to as "in F♯ minor" (the F♯ minor triad has never been established throughout), and played Allegro vivace. It is a character piece, based on the Commedia dell'arte character Pulcinella (Polichinelle is the French translation of this word) from which Punch (from Punch and Judy) derives. It is in ternary form (ABA), beginning and ending with a fast section that gives way to a slower, lyrical melodious passage in the middle.

=== 5. Serenade in B♭ minor ===
The set ends with Serenade (Серенада, Serenada). It was rewritten by Rachmaninoff in 1940, along with the Melodie in E major. In several places, the key is in B♭ Dorian mode instead of B♭ minor.
