= Tatsuya Tsuboi =

Japanese figure skater (born 2002)

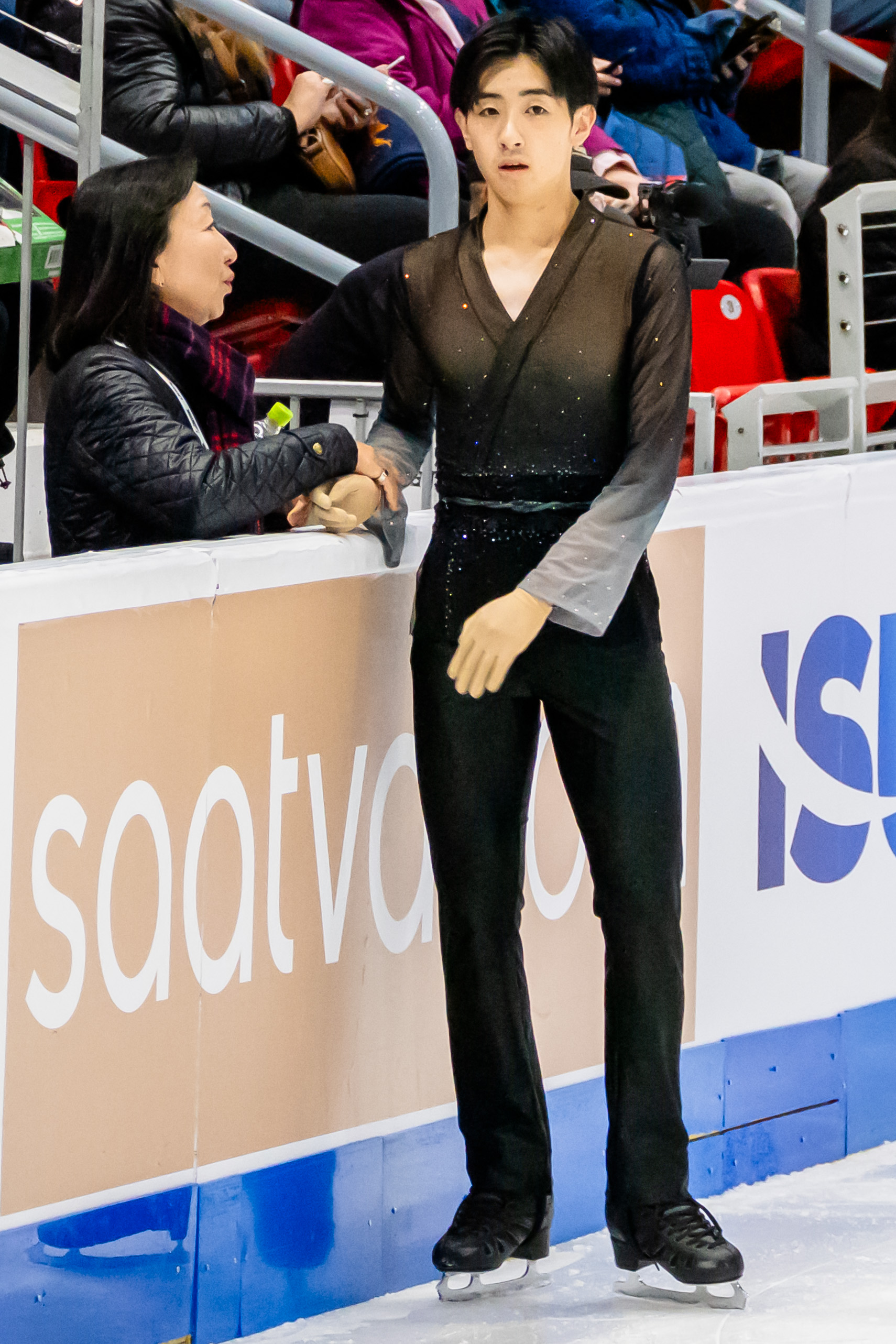
- Tsuboi at 2025 Skate America

Personal information
- Native name: 壷井 達也
- Born: December 17, 2002 (age 23) Okazaki, Japan
- Home town: Hyogo
- Height: 1.65 m (5 ft 5 in)

Figure skating career
- Country: Japan
- Coach: Sonoko Nakano; Mitsuko Graham; Sei Kawahara
- Skating club: Sysmex Corporation
- Began skating: 2009

Medal record
Japan Championships
Bronze medal – third place	2024–25 Osaka	Singles
World Junior Championships
Bronze medal – third place	2022 Tallinn	Singles

Tatsuya Tsuboi (壷井 達也, Tsuboi Tatsuya; born December 17, 2002) is a Japanese figure skater. He is the 2024–25 Japan national bronze medalist, the 2024 NHK Trophy bronze medalist, the 2023 World University Games silver medalist, and the 2022 Coupe du Printemps silver medalist.

On the junior level, he is the 2022 World Junior bronze medalist and 2018–19 Japan junior national champion.

== Personal life ==
Tatsuya Tsuboi was born in Okazaki, Aichi. As of 2022, he is a student at Kobe University, studying in the International Human Sciences Department.

== Career ==
=== Early career ===
Tsuboi began learning how to skate in 2009 at the age of seven.

After making his international junior debut at the 2017 edition of the Coupe du Printemps toward the end of the 2016–17 season, Tsuboi made his Junior Grand Prix debut the following autumn, placing fifth at both the 2017 JGP Belarus and 2017 JGP Italy. After winning the bronze medal at the 2017–18 Japan Junior Championships, he finished thirteenth at the senior level. He returned to the Coupe du Printemps, this time winning gold.

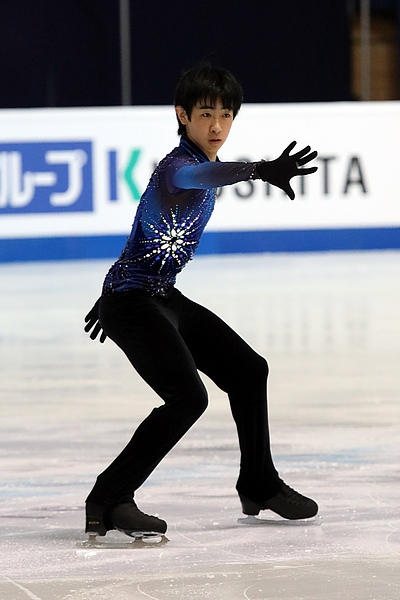
Tsuboi at the 2019 World Junior Championships

Tsuboi did not compete on the 2018–19 Junior Grand Prix, but won the junior silver medal at the Asian Open Trophy. He won gold at the 2018–19 Japan Junior Championships, and finished seventh at the senior level, as a result of which he was assigned to compete at the 2019 World Junior Championships. Tsuboi finished fourteenth there. Then, he was invited to skate in the gala at the 2019 World Team Trophy as the reigning Japan junior national champion.

=== 2021–2022 season: Junior World bronze ===
After appearing only domestically over the following two seasons, partially as a result of the COVID-19 pandemic, Tsuboi became more active in the 2021–22 season, even though Japan opted not to assign skaters to the Junior Grand Prix. He was the silver medalist at the 2021–22 Japan Junior Championships, and placed ninth at the senior edition. These placements earned him an assignment to the 2022 World Junior Championships. Also given precursor assignments to the Bavarian Open and the Coupe du Printemps, he won gold at the former at the junior level and silver at latter at the senior level.

The World Junior Championships were originally scheduled for March in Sofia. However, as a result of both the Omicron variant and the Russo-Ukrainian War, they could not be held in their original location, and were moved to Tallinn in April. As well, the International Skating Union banned Russian and Belarusian athletes from competing, significantly altering the figure skating field. Tsuboi finished fifth in the short program with a new personal best score. He was third in the free skate, rising to third overall to win the bronze medal.

=== 2022–2023 season: Senior debut ===
Moving to the senior level permanently, Tsuboi was assigned to make his Grand Prix debut at the MK John Wilson Trophy, where he finished fifth. At his second event, the Grand Prix of Espoo, he was fifth in the short program but rose to fourth after the free skate, where he set new personal bests in that segment and overall. He described nothing but "happiness" with the results.

Tsuboi finished ninth at the 2022–23 Japan Championships, and was subsequently assigned to compete at the 2023 Winter World University Games. He won the silver medal.

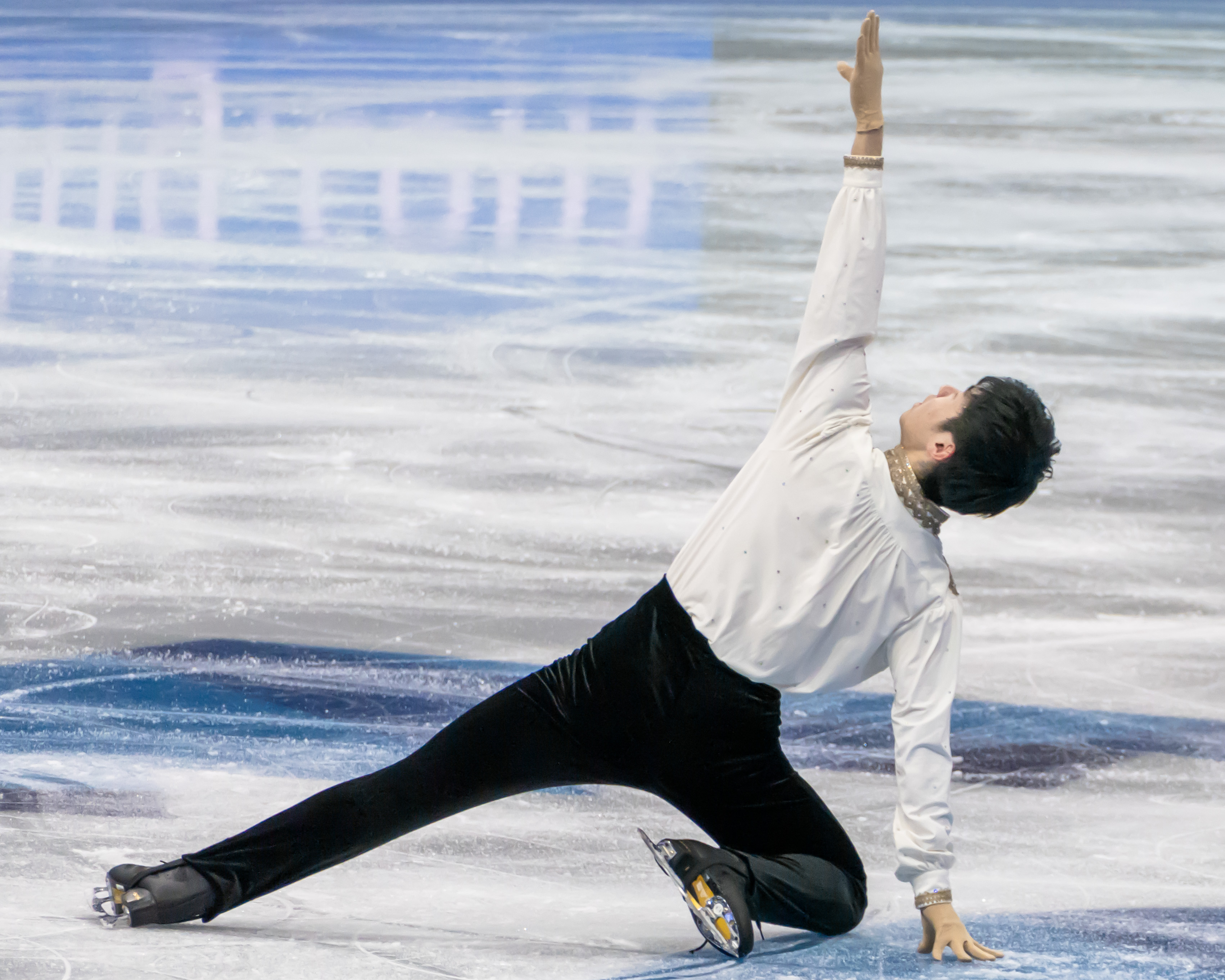
Tsuboi finishing his short program at the 2025 World Championships

=== 2023–2024 season ===
Given two assignments on the Grand Prix, Tsuboi finished eighth at the 2023 Skate America and ninth at the 2023 NHK Trophy. He went on to finish seventh at the 2023–24 Japan Championships before closing his season with a silver medal win at the 2024 Challenge Cup.

=== 2024–2025 season: Japanese national bronze ===
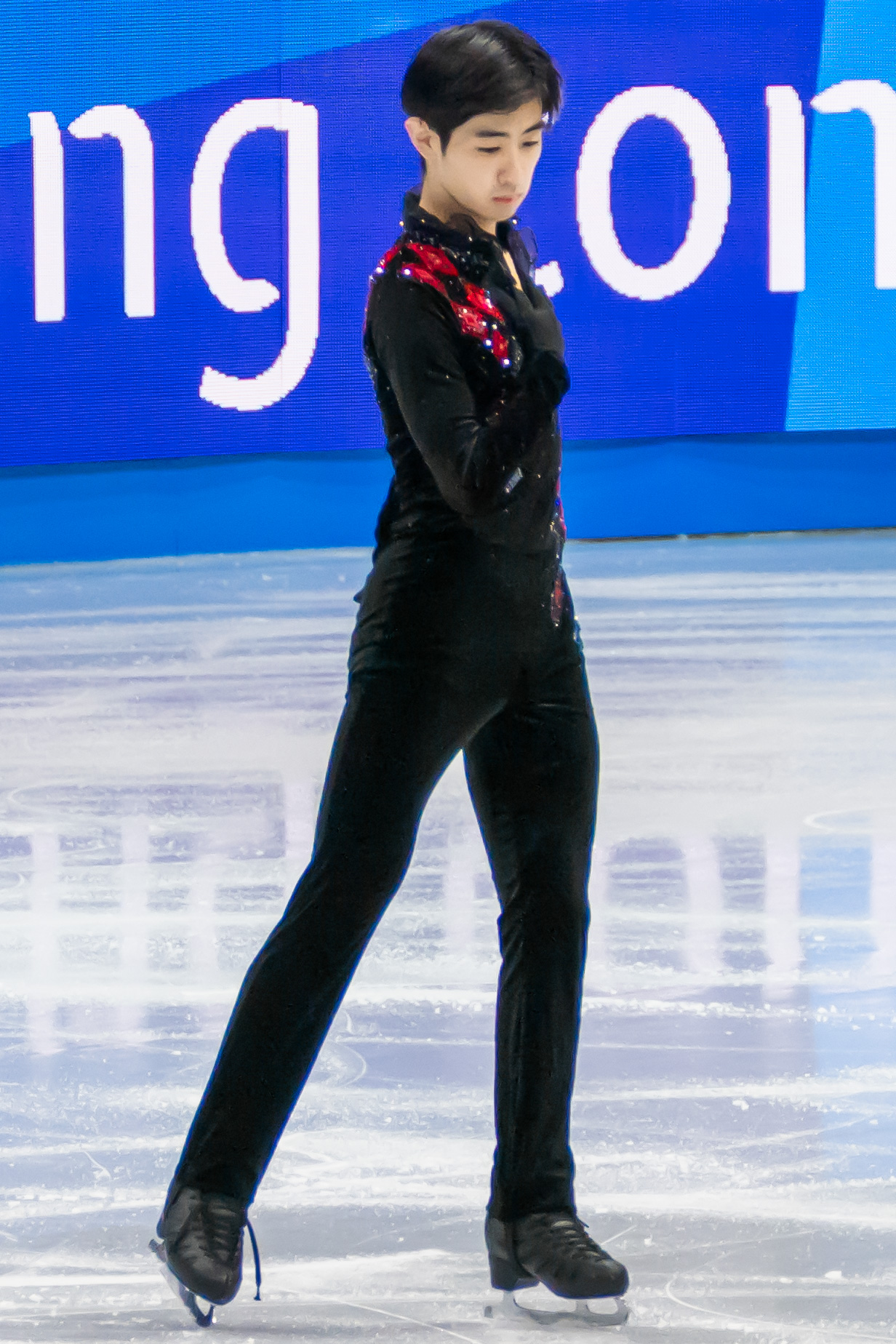
Tsuboi finishing his free skate at the 2025 World Championships

Tsuboi started the season by finishing fifth at the 2024 Asian Open Trophy. Selected as a host pick at the 2024 NHK Trophy, Tsuboi placed third in both the short program and free skate, scoring personal bests in all competition segments. He would walk away with the bronze medal overall. Pleased with this result, Tsuboi said in an interview afterwards, "I didn't even think that I would end up third. With the short and free program and free skating, I knew I had to do everything I can, put my best out there and give it my all. The day in day out efforts I've been making have paid off. This is my first podium in the senior Grand Prix series, so it's been a great confidence booster."

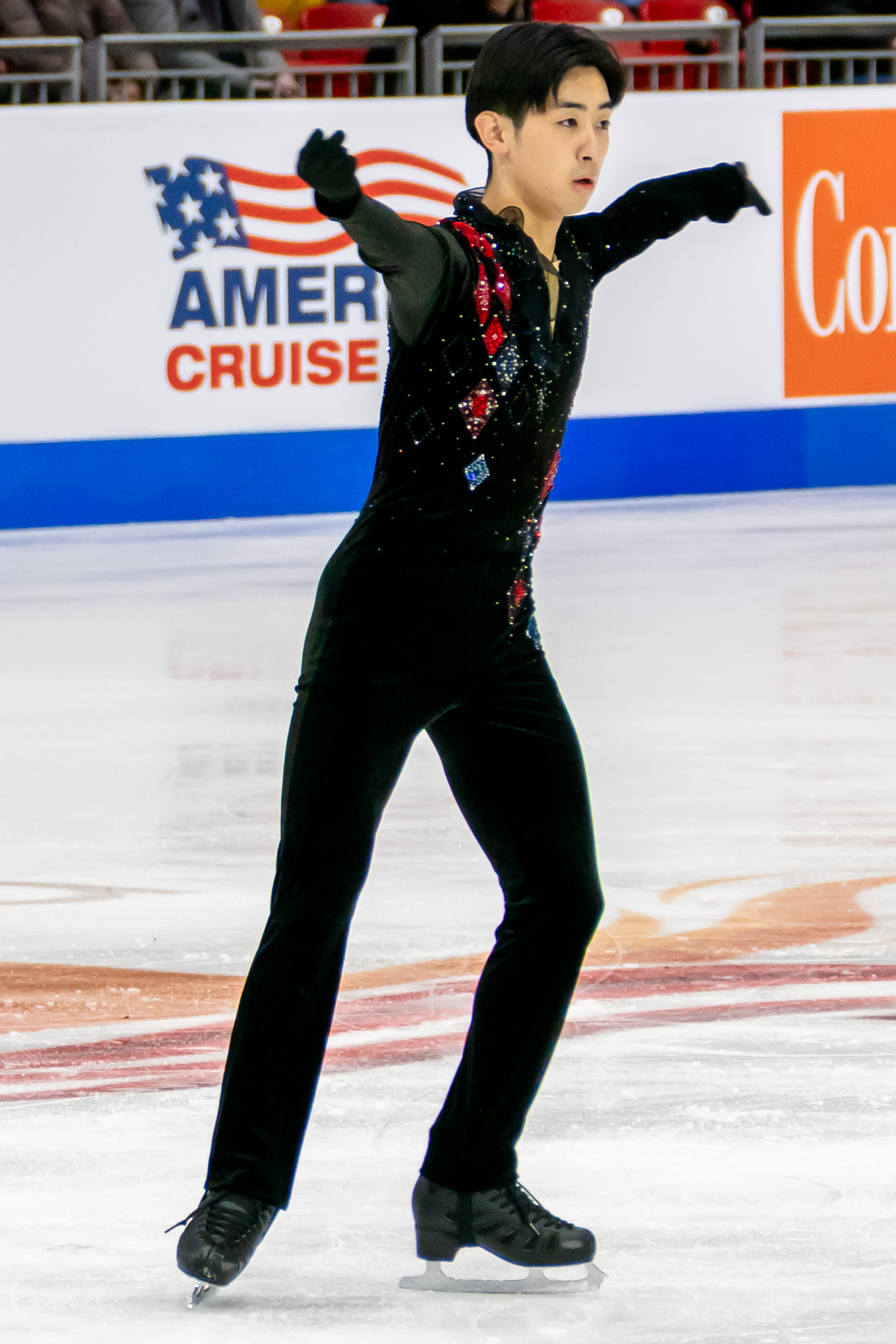
Tsuboi finishing his free skate at 2025 Skate America

In late December, Tsuboi competed at the 2024–25 Japan Championships. During the short program, Tsuboi finished a disappointing fourteenth place after landing his quadruple salchow on the quarter and popping his triple axel attempt into a single. During the free skate the following day, however, Tsuboi delivered a solid free skate, placing third in that segment of the competition. Due to several skaters that placed ahead of him in the short program faltering during the free skate, Tsuboi managed to move up to the bronze medal position overall. Due to this result, Tsuboi was named to the Four Continents and World teams.

In late February, Tsuboi placed fifth at the 2025 FourContinents Championships in Seoul, South Korea. The following month, at the 2025 World Championships in Boston, Massachusetts, United States, he finished the event in twenty-first place.

=== 2025–26 season ===
Tsuboi opened his season by competing on the 2025–26 Challenge Series, finishing fifth at the 2025 CS Kinoshita Group Cup and eighth at the 2025 CS Nebelhorn Trophy. He then went on to compete on the 2025–26 Grand Prix circuit, placing seventh at the 2025 Grand Prix de France and eighth at 2025 Skate America.

In December, Tsuboi competed at the 2025–26 Japan Championships, placing thirteenth overall. Following the event, Tsuboi announced he would retire at the end of the season. However, in March, Tsuboi announced that he had changed his mind about retiring and that he would instead of sit the 2026–27 figure skating season out to focus on his studies with plans to return to competing.

== Programs ==
Season	Short program	Free skating	Exhibition
2025–2026	Anniversary by Yoshiki choreo. by Massimo Scali	I Pagliacci by Ruggero Leoncavallo; Vesti la giubba performed by BBC Concert Orchestra & Barry Wordsworth; Preludio performed by Philadelphia Orchestra & Riccardo Muti; Vesti la giubba performed by Philadelphia Orchestra & Riccardo Muti; Vesti la giubba performed by BBC Concert Orchestra & Barry Wordsworth; No, Pagliaccio non son performed by National Philharmonic Orchestra; Suvvia, coserribile performed by Philadelphia Orchestra & Riccardo Muti choreo. by Massimo Scali	
2024–2025	En Aranjuez Con Tu Amor by Joaquín Rodrigo performed by Il Divo choreo. by Zachary Donohue; Adore; Anima by Luca D'Alberto choreo. by Masahiro Kawagoe	I Pagliacci by Ruggero Leoncavallo; Vesti la giubba performed by BBC Concert Orchestra & Barry Wordsworth; Preludio performed by Philadelphia Orchestra & Riccardo Muti; Vesti la giubba performed by Philadelphia Orchestra & Riccardo Muti; Vesti la giubba performed by BBC Concert Orchestra & Barry Wordsworth; No, Pagliaccio non son performed by National Philharmonic Orchestra; Suvvia, coserribile performed by Philadelphia Orchestra & Riccardo Muti choreo. by Massimo Scali	Stairway to Heaven (2012 Remaster) by Led Zeppelin; Stairway to Heaven performed by Rodrigo y Gabriela choreo. by Misao Sato
2023–2024	En Aranjuez Con Tu Amor by Joaquín Rodrigo performed by Il Divo choreo. by Zachary Donohue	Torn (Redux) (from High Strung) by Nathan Lanier, Phil Thornalley, Anne Preven, Scott Cutler choreo. by Massimo Scali	Johanna (from Sweeney Todd: The Demon Barber of Fleet Street) performed by Jamie Campbell Bower
2022–2023	Stairway to Heaven (2012 Remaster) by Led Zeppelin; Stairway to Heaven performed by Rodrigo y Gabriela choreo. by Misao Sato	Torn (Redux) (from High Strung) by Nathan Lanier, Phil Thornalley, Anne Preven, Scott Cutler choreo. by Massimo Scali	Johanna (from Sweeney Todd: The Demon Barber of Fleet Street) performed by Jamie Campbell Bower
2021–2022	The Tree of Life by Alexandre Desplat choreo. by Kohei Yoshino	Preludes, Op. 23; No. 7: Prelude in C minor; No. 5: Prelude in G minor; No. 4: Prelude in D major by Sergei Rachmaninoff choreo. by Kohei Yoshino	
2020–2021	Puttin' On the Ritz by Irving Berlin choreo. by Akiko Suzuki	Preludes, Op. 23; No. 7: Prelude in C minor; No. 5: Prelude in G minor; No. 4: Prelude in D major by Sergei Rachmaninoff choreo. by Kohei Yoshino	
2019–2020	Puttin' On the Ritz by Irving Berlin choreo. by Akiko Suzuki	Preludes, Op. 23; No. 5: Prelude in G minor; No. 4: Prelude in D major by Sergei Rachmaninoff choreo. by Kohei Yoshino; Symphony No. 9 From the New World by Antonín Dvořák choreo. by Yuko Hongo	
2018–2019	Your Song by Elton John choreo. by Kenji Miyamoto	Symphony No. 9 From the New World by Antonín Dvořák choreo. by Yuko Hongo	
2017–2018	Your Song by Elton John choreo. by Kenji Miyamoto	Rurouni Kenshin by Nasoki Sato	

== Competitive highlights ==
- GP – Event of the ISU Grand Prix Series
- JGP – Event of the ISU Junior Grand Prix Series
- CS – Event of the ISU Challenger Series
- TBD – Assigned
- WD – Withdrew from competition
- C – Event was cancelled
- Medals at team events are awarded for the team results only. Individual placements at team events are listed in parentheses.

Competition placements at senior level
Season	2016–17	2017–18	2018–19	2019–20	2020–21	2022–23	2023–24	2024–25	2025–26
World Championships								21st	
Four Continents Championships								5th	
Japan Championships	10th	13th	7th	WD	9th	9th	7th	3rd	13th
GP Finland						4th			
GP France									7th
GP NHK Trophy							9th	3rd	
GP Skate America							8th		8th
GP Wilson Trophy						5th			
CS Kinoshita Group Cup									5th
CS Nebelhorn Trophy									8th
Asian Open Trophy								5th	
Challenge Cup						8th	2nd		
Coupe du Printemps					2nd				
Winter World University Games						2nd			

Competition placements at junior level
Season	2015–16	2016–17	2017–18	2018–19	2019–20	2020–21	2021–22
World Junior Championships				14th			3rd
Japan Championships	14th	5th	3rd	1st	4th	7th	2nd
JGP Belarus			5th				
JGP Slovakia			5th				
Asian Open Trophy				2nd			
Bavarian Open							1st
Coupe du Printemps		2nd	1st				

== Detailed results ==
ISU personal best scores in the +5/-5 GOE System
Segment	Type	Score	Event
Total	TSS	251.52	2024 NHK Trophy
Short program	TSS	87.04	2025 Grand Prix de France
Short program	TES	48.47	2024 NHK Trophy
Short program	PCS	39.28	2025 Grand Prix de France
Free skating	TSS	166.50	2024 NHK Trophy
Free skating	TES	89.28	2024 NHK Trophy
Free skating	PCS	78.62	2022 Grand Prix of Espoo

=== Senior level ===
Results in the 2024–25 season
Date	Event	SP		FS		Total	
Date	Event	P	Score	P	Score	P	Score
Sep 2–6, 2024	(Hong Kong) 2024 Asian Open Trophy	2	82.37	7	122.61	5	204.98
Nov 8–10, 2024	(Japan) 2024 NHK Trophy	3	85.02	3	166.50	3	251.52
Dec 19–22, 2024	2024–25 Japan Championships	14	73.94	3	173.37	3	247.31
Feb 19–23, 2025	(South Korea) 2025 Four Continents Championships	6	78.07	5	156.86	5	234.93
Mar 25–30, 2025	(United States) 2025 World Championships	24	73.00	19	143.26	21	216.26

Results in the 2025–26 season
Date	Event	SP		FS		Total	
Date	Event	P	Score	P	Score	P	Score
Sep 5–7, 2025	(Japan) 2025 CS Kinoshita Group Cup	9	78.82	4	152.37	5	231.19
Sep 25–27, 2025	(Germany) 2025 CS Nebelhorn Trophy	12	63.35	8	145.66	8	209.01
Oct 17–19, 2025	2025 Grand Prix de France	4	87.04	9	145.74	7	232.78
Nov 14–16, 2025	(United States) 2025 Skate America	6	77.68	7	150.35	8	228.03
Dec 18–21, 2025	2025–26 Japan Championships	10	74.52	15	132.91	13	207.43

2023–24 season
Date	Event	SP	FS	Total
February 22–25, 2024	2024 Challenge Cup	1; 85.80	2; 169.01	2; 254.81
December 20–24, 2023	2023–24 Japan Championships	7; 85.85	7; 166.49	7; 252.34
November 24–26, 2023	2023 NHK Trophy	12; 64.63	5; 151.99	9; 216.62
October 20–22, 2023	2023 Skate America	9; 72.57	8; 144.41	8; 216.98
2022–23 season
Date	Event	SP	FS	Total
February 23–26, 2023	2023 Challenge Cup	12; 67.16	5; 145.18	8; 212.34
January 12–22, 2023	2023 Winter World University Games	2; 84.48	2; 159.34	2; 243.82
December 21–25, 2022	2022–23 Japan Championships	11; 74.84	9; 146.33	9; 221.17
November 25–27, 2022	2022 Grand Prix of Espoo	5; 78.82	4; 166.08	4; 244.90
November 11–13, 2022	2022 MK John Wilson Trophy	7; 76.75	5; 149.38	5; 226.13
2021–22 season
Date	Event	SP	FS	Total
December 22–26, 2021	2021–22 Japan Championships	12; 77.31	8; 157.90	9; 235.21
2018–19 season
Date	Event	SP	FS	Total
December 20–24, 2018	2018–19 Japan Championships	11; 69.95	5; 144.92	7; 214.87
2017–18 season
Date	Event	SP	FS	Total
December 21–23, 2017	2017–18 Japan Championships	14; 63.35	11; 135.36	13; 198.71
2016–17 season
Date	Event	SP	FS	Total
December 22–25, 2016	2016–17 Japan Championships	15; 59.49	8; 127.54	10; 187.03

=== Junior level ===
2021–22 season
Date	Event	SP	FS	Total
April 13–17, 2022	2022 World Junior Championships	5; 79.15	3; 154.67	3; 233.82
March 18–20, 2022	2022 Coupe du Printemps	2; 77.35	2; 148.29	2; 225.64
January 18–22, 2022	2021 Bavarian Open	1; 81.92	1; 156.42	1; 238.34
November 19–21, 2021	2021–22 Japan Junior Championships	1; 81.05	2; 146.55	2; 227.60
2020–21 season
Date	Event	SP	FS	Total
November 21–23, 2020	2020–21 Japan Junior Championships	4; 73.18	10; 107.38	7; 180.56
2019–20 season
Date	Event	SP	FS	Total
November 15–17, 2019	2019–20 Japan Junior Championships	6; 68.83	3; 123.94	4; 192.77
2018–19 season
Date	Event	SP	FS	Total
March 4–10, 2019	2019 World Junior Championships	20; 62.59	10; 133.29	14; 195.88
November 23–25, 2018	2018–19 Japan Junior Championships	2; 78.23	2; 144.56	1; 222.79
August 1–5, 2018	2018 Asian Open Trophy	2; 50.87	2; 117.14	2; 168.01
2017–18 season
Date	Event	SP	FS	Total
March 16–18, 2018	2018 Coupe du Printemps	1; 64.43	1; 131.40	1; 195.83
November 24–26, 2017	2017–18 Japan Junior Championships	5; 63.53	2; 125.62	3; 189.15
October 11–14, 2017	2017 JGP Italy	6; 65.98	5; 132.46	5; 198.44
September 20–24, 2017	2017 JGP Belarus	5; 66.49	5; 118.70	5; 185.19
2016–17 season
Date	Event	SP	FS	Total
March 10–12, 2017	2017 Coupe du Printemps	2; 51.72	2; 104.63	2; 156.35
November 23–25, 2016	2016–17 Japan Junior Championships	6; 56.07	5; 121.55	5; 177.62
2015–16 season
Date	Event	SP	FS	Total
November 21–23, 2015	2015–16 Japan Junior Championships	14; 48.89	14; 96.69	14; 145.58
