= Miss Hawaii =

Beauty pageant competition

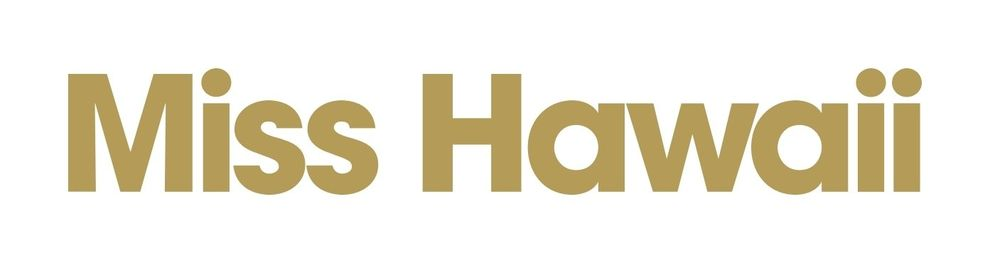
- Formation: 1948
- Type: Beauty pageant
- Headquarters: Honolulu
- Location: Hawaii
- Members: Miss America
- Official language: English
- Website: Official website

The Miss Hawaii competition is the pageant that selects the representative for the State of Hawaii in the Miss America pageant, and the name of the title held by that winner. Hawaii first competed at Miss America in 1948 and has twice won the Miss America title, in 1992 and 2001.

Carly Yoshida of Waikoloa was crowned Miss Hawaii on June 19, 2026, at the Hawaii Theatre in Honolulu. She competed for the title of Miss America 2027 on September 6, 2026, at the Kravis Center for the Performing Arts in West Palm Beach, Florida.

== Gallery of past titleholders ==
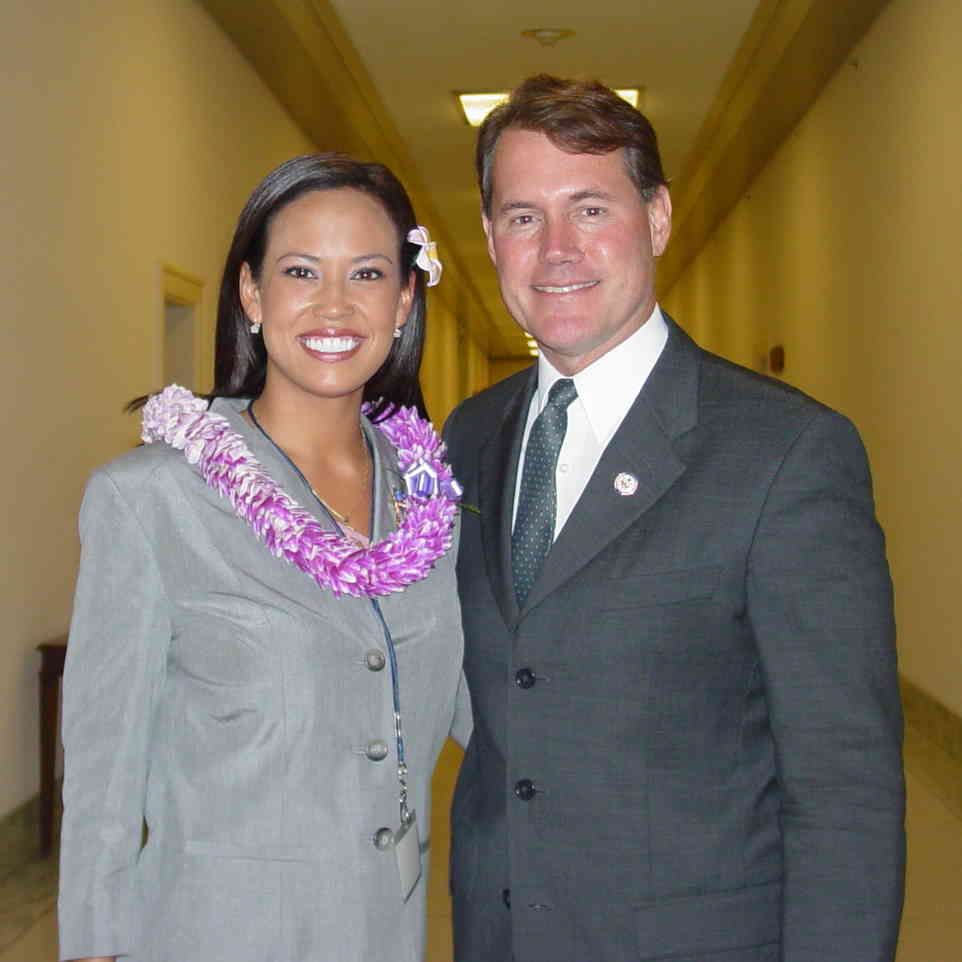
Kanoelani Gibson,
Miss Hawaii 2003

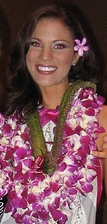
Malika Dudley,
Miss Hawaii 2005

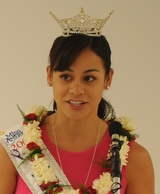
Raeceen Woolford,
Miss Hawaii 2009

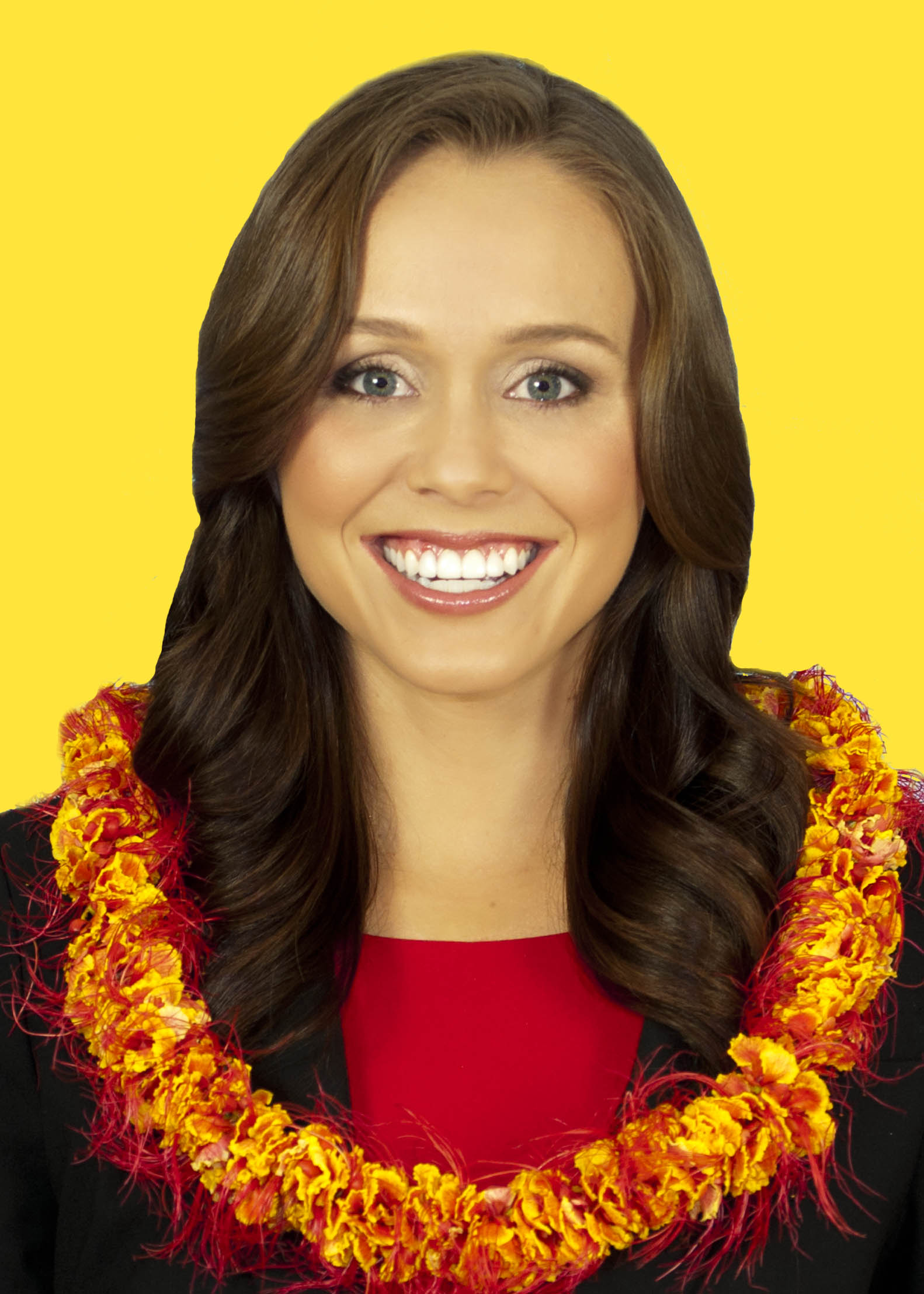
Lauren Cheape,
Miss Hawaii 2011

== Results summary ==
The following is a visual summary of the past results of Miss Hawaii titleholders at the national Miss America pageants/competitions. The year in parentheses indicates the year of the national competition during which a placement and/or award was garnered, not the year attached to the contestant's state title.

=== Placements ===
- Miss Americas: Carolyn Suzanne Sapp (1992), Angela Perez Baraquio (2001)
- 1st runners-up: Kanoelani Gibson (2004)
- 2nd runners-up: Susan D. Pickering (1964), Jalee Fuselier (2011)
- 3rd runners-up: N/A
- 4th runners-up: Patricia Lei Anderson (1963)
- Top 7: Raeceen Anuenue Woolford (2010)
- Top 10: Beverly Kathleen Rivera (1953), Barbara Mamo Vieira (1956), Jere Wright (1957), Joan Whitney Vine (1962), Leina'ala Ann Teruya (1965), Sheryl Hung Lan Lokelani Akaka (1970), Debbie Nakanelua (1985), Desiree Moana Cruz (1989), Kanoe Aberegg (1994), Melissa Ann Short (1997), Erika Kauffman (1998), Pilialoha Gaison (2007), Nicole Fox (2009)
- Top 11: Lauren Teruya (2023), Carly Yoshida (2027)
- Top 15: Bee Jay Johnston (1949), Nicole Holbrook (2020)

=== Awards ===
==== Preliminary awards ====
- Preliminary Lifestyle and Fitness: Barbara Mamo Vieira (1956), Jere Wright (1957), Kathleen Puanani O'Sullivan (1971), Carolyn Suzanne Sapp (1992), Melissa Ann Short (1997), Erika Kauffman (1998), Angela Perez Baraquio (2001), Jalee Fuselier (2011)
- Preliminary Talent: Patricia Lei Anderson (1963), Melissa Ann Short (1997), Kanoelani Gibson (2004), Pilialoha Gaison (2007), Lauren Cheape (2012)

==== Non-finalist awards ====
- Non-finalist Talent: Kapiolani Miller (1955), Aurora Joan Ka'awa (1972), Jeanne Miyamoto (1986), Cheryl Bartlett (1987), Cheryl Akemi Toma (1991), Jennifer Hera (1999), Lauren Cheape (2012), Penelope Ng Pack (2019)

==== Other awards ====
- Miss Congeniality: Yun Tau Zane (1948), Dell-Fin Kala’upaona Po’aha (1951), Claire Katherine Heen (1952), Barbara Mamo Vieira (1956), Gordean Leilehua Lee (1960), Kanoelehua Kaumeheiwa (1974), Coline-Helen Kaualoku Aiu (1975) (tie), Malika Dudley (2006), Raeceen Anuenue Woolford (2010), Jeanné Kapela (2015)
- Children's Miracle Network (CMN) Miracle Maker Award: Lauren Cheape (2012)
- Dr. David B. Allman Medical Scholarship: Ligaya Stice (1990)
- Charles & Theresa Brown Scholarship: Stephanie Steuri (2015)
- Quality of Life Award Finalists: Nicole Fox (2009), Lauren Cheape (2012)
- STEM Scholarship Finalists: Allison Chu (2017)
- Women in Business Scholarship Award Winners: Penelope Ng Pack (2019)
- Women in Business Scholarship Award 1st runners-up: Nicole Holbrook (2020)
- Show Me Your Shoes Winner: Emalia Dalire (2026)

== Winners ==
- Declared as winner
- Ended as a runner-up
- Ended as a finalist or semi-finalist

Year	Name	Hometown	Age	Local Title	Miss America Talent	Placement at Miss America	Special scholarships at Miss America	Notes
2026	Carly Yoshida	Waikoloa	26	Miss Kaka’ako	Hula	Top 11		Previously Miss Hawaii's Outstanding Teen 2016
2025	Emalia Dalire	Kaneohe	19	Miss Kaneohe	Hula		Miss America's Show Me Your Shoes Scholarship recipient	Previously Miss Hawaii Teen Volunteer 2024
2024	Hayley Cheyney-Kāne	Kaneohe	27	Miss Waimanalo	Vocal and Hula, "Aloha Wau la'oe"			Previously Miss Hawaii’s Outstanding Teen 2013
2023	Star Dahl-Thurston	Honolulu	25	Miss Chinatown Hawaii	Slam Poetry			
2022	Lauren Teruya	Honolulu	23	Miss Honolulu	Musical Theatre	Top 11		Previously Miss Hawaii Teen USA 2017 Sister of Miss Hawaii Teen USA 2012 and Miss Hawaii 2017, Kathryn Teruya Crowned on Miss Hawaii's 75th Anniversary
2021	Courtney Choy	Ewa Beach	25	Miss Chinatown Hawai'i	Hula Auana			
2019–20 (Note: Titleholder extended to a second full year in 2020 after state and national pageants postponed to 2021 due to the COVID-19 pandemic)	Nicole Holbrook	Laie	20	Miss Central O’ahu	Piano, "Concerto in A Minor"	Top 15	Women in Business Scholarship Award 1st runner-up	
2018	Penelope Ng Pack	Honolulu	23	Miss Chinatown Hawaii	Vocal, "They Just Keep Moving the Line" from Smash		Non-finalist Talent Award Women in Business Scholarship Award	
2017	Kathryn Teruya	Honolulu	21	Miss Kaka'ako	Dance, "I Want to be a Rockette"			Previously Miss Hawaii Teen USA 2012; Winner of the Miss Teen USA Fan Vote, earning her a spot in the Top 16 Sister of Miss Hawaii Teen USA 2017 and Miss Hawaii 2022, Lauren Teruya
2016	Allison Chu	Kahala	22	Miss Aloha Latina	Operatic vocal, "O mio babbino caro" from Gianni Schicchi		STEM Scholarship Finalist	Sister of Miss Hawaii Teen USA 2010 and Miss Hawaii USA 2018, Julianne Chu Later Miss Hawaii USA 2021
2015	Jeanné Kapela	Kailua-Kona	20	Miss Kaka’ako	Contemporary Dance, "Flashlight" by Jessie J		Miss Congeniality	
2014	Stephanie Steuri	Kalaheo	20	Miss Paradise Kauai	Hula, "The Prayer"		Charles & Theresa Brown Scholarship	
2013	Crystal Lee	Waipahu	22	Miss Chinatown Hawaii	Contemporary Dance, "Halo"			
2012	Skyler Kamaka	Kaneohe	21	Miss Diamond Head	Hula			
2011	Lauren Cheape	Mililani	23	Miss East Oahu	Jump Rope Routine, "Theme from Hawaii Five-O"		CMN Miracle Makers' Award Non-finalist Talent Award Preliminary Talent Award Quality of Life Award Finalist	Contestant at National Sweetheart 2010 Incumbent State Representative for 45th District in the Hawaii State House of Representatives
2010	Jalee Fuselier	Haleiwa	22	Miss North Shore	Vocal, "Feeling Good"	2nd runner-up	Preliminary Lifestyle & Fitness Award	Previously Miss Hawaii's Outstanding Teen 2005
2009	Raeceen Woolford	Pearl City	24	Miss Ko Olina	Hula, "Ka'ena"	Top 7	Miss Congeniality	
2008	Nicole Fox	Honolulu	23	Miss Island O'ahu	Tahitian Otea Dance	Top 10	Quality of Life Award Finalist	
2007	Ashley Layfield	Kailua	21	Miss Kahala	Jazz Dance, "Listen"			Sister of Miss Hawaii USA 2008, Jonelle Layfield 2nd runner-up in Miss New York USA 2012 and 2013 pageants
2006	Pilialoha Gaison	Kaneohe	23	Miss Island Ilima	Tahitian Dance, "Te Vaka"	Top 10	Preliminary Talent Award	
2005	Malika Dudley	Papaikou	23	Miss Kahala	Vocal, "It's in His Kiss"		Miss Congeniality	
2004	Olena Rubin	Kilauea	23	Miss West O’ahu	Vocal, "Do You Wanna Dance?"		Charles & Theresa Brown Scholarship Miss Congeniality	Contestant (1999) & Top 10 (2003) at National Sweetheart pageants
2003	Kanoelani Gibson	Kapolei	22	Miss Diamond Head	Vocal, "(You Make Me Feel Like) A Natural Woman"	1st runner-up	Preliminary Talent Award	
2002	Kehaulani Christian	Pearl City	23	Miss VIP	Tahitian Dance			
2001	Denby Dung	Honolulu	23	Miss West O’ahu	Soprano Saxophone, "G-Bop"			
2000	Billie Kiyoka Takaki	Honolulu	23	Miss Diamond Head		Did not compete; originally 2nd runner-up, later assumed the title after Baraquio won Miss America 2001		
2000	Angela Perez Baraquio	Honolulu	24	Miss Leeward	Hula, "Come Follow Me, I Am Hawaii" by Cathy Foy	Winner	Preliminary Lifestyle & Fitness Award	First Asian American Miss America
1999	Candes Meijide Gentry	Honolulu	22	Miss Oahu	Vocal, "A New Life" from Jekyll & Hyde			
1998	Jennifer Hera	Lanai City	21	Miss Hawaii Pacific University	Vocal, "Someone Like You" from Jekyll & Hyde		Non-finalist Talent Award	
1997	Erika Kauffman	Kailua-Kona	18	Miss Hawaii Island	Vocal, "God Help the Outcasts" from The Hunchback of Notre Dame	Top 10	Preliminary Lifestyle & Fitness Award	
1996	Melissa Ann Short	Kaʻaʻawa	23	Miss Hawaii Pacific University	Classical Vocal, "Ah! Je Veux Vivre" from Romeo & Juliet	Top 10	Preliminary Talent Award Preliminary Lifestyle & Fitness Award	
1995	Traci Toguchi	Honolulu	20	Miss Ala Moana	Vocal, "And I Am Telling You I'm Not Going"			Top 10 at National Sweetheart 1993 pageant 2nd runner-up at National Sweetheart 1994 pageant
1994	Courtney Nicolle Glaza	Kaneohe	22	Miss Honolulu	Classical Piano			
1993	Kanoe Aberegg	Honolulu	24	Miss Oahu	Chant & Hula, "Aloha ʻOe"	Top 10		
1992	Pamela Kimura	Honolulu	24	Miss Waikiki	Vocal, "Orange Colored Sky"			
1991	Lani Stone			Miss Diamond Head		Did not compete; later assumed the title after Sapp won Miss America 1992		
1991	Carolyn Suzanne Sapp	Honolulu	24	Miss Hawaii Pacific University	Vocal, "Ain't Misbehavin'"	Winner	Preliminary Lifestyle & Fitness Award	Previously National Sweetheart 1990
1990	Cheryl Akemi Toma	Pearl City	26	Miss Diamond Head	Piano / Vocal, Gershwin medley		Non-finalist Talent Award	
1989	Ligaya Stice	Kaneohe	22	Miss Kahala	Vocal/Jazz Dance, "Quiet Please, There's a Lady On Stage"		Dr. David B. Allman Medical Scholarship	
1988	Desiree Moana Cruz	Hilo	26	Miss Maui	Vocal, "I Am Changing" from Dreamgirls	Top 10		Miss Hawaii International 1980
1987	Luana Alapa	Honolulu	26	Miss Island International	Vocal, "South Sea Sadie"			Mother of Miss Hawaii Teen USA 2015, Kyla Hee
1986	Cheryl Bartlett	Honolulu	23	Miss Kaneohe	Vocal, "America the Beautiful"		Non-finalist Talent Award	
1985	Jeanne Miyamoto	Honolulu	25	Miss Kalihi	Vocal / Piano, "Bali Ha'i"		Non-finalist Talent Award	
1984	Debbie Nakanelua	Honolulu	26	Miss Diamond Head	Stylized Hula, "Hawaiian Hula Eyes"	Top 10		
1983	Wendy Sue Nelson	Kihei	21	Miss Maui	Vocal, "Hit Me With a Hot Note And Watch Me Bounce" from Sophisticated Ladies			
1982	Gale Lee Thomas	Honolulu	21	Miss Squire	Baton Twirling, "Theme from Magnum P.I." & "Hawaiian War Chant"			
1981	Pamela Iwalani Offer	Honolulu	23	Miss Ala Moana Americana	Vocal, "Don't Cry for Me Argentina"			Mother of Miss Arizona 2010, Kathryn Bulkley
1980	Keonelehua Cook	Aiea	23	Miss Leeward	Interpretive Dance			
1979	Sheron Leihuanani Bissen	Kahului	20	Miss Maui	Vocal, "Over the Rainbow"			
1978	Elizabeth Kapu'uwailani Lindsey	Laie	22	Miss Waikiki	Silhouette Interpretive Dance & Monologue			
1977	Libby Kawaikikilani Lee	Aiea	18	Miss Kalihi	Hawaiian Dance & Nose Flute, "A Hamakua Au"			
1976	Haunani Asing	Kailua	18	Miss Kailua	Guitar & Vocal, "Hawaiian Lullaby"			
1975	Cathy Foy	Aiea	22	Miss Hawaii Kai	Vocal / Dance, "Look What Happened To Mabel" from Mack & Mabel			During the Miss America 2001 pageant, Angela Perez Baraquio danced hula to Foy's vocal recording of "Come Follow Me, I Am Hawaii"
1974	Coline-Helen Kanaloku Aiu	Honolulu	23	Miss Hawaii Kai	Modern Jazz Dance, "Hospital Shootout"		Miss Congeniality (tie)	
1973	Kanoelehua Kaumeheiwa	Hawaii Kai	19	Miss Hawaii Kai	Hula		Miss Congeniality	
1972	Marlene Diane Kehaulani Kalahiki	Kailua-Kona	22	Miss West Kauai	Modern Jazz Dance, "Shotgun"			
1971	Aurora Joan Ka'awa	Makakilo City	19	Miss Aloha Hawaii	Silhouette Hula Dance & Speech, "In the Islands"		Non-finalist Talent Award	
1970	Kathleen Puanani O'Sullivan	Kailua	18	Miss Kailua	Modern Dance, "Ritual Fire Dance"		Preliminary Lifestyle & Fitness Award	
1969	Sheryl Hung Lan Lokelani Akaka	Honolulu	22	Miss Waikiki	Piano, "Prelude in E-flat Major" by Sergei Rachmaninoff	Top 10		
1968	Deborah Ynez Gima	Kailua	18	Miss Aloha Hawaii	Hawaiian Song, "Wonderful World of Aloha" & "Kaneha"			
1967	Robin Engel	Honolulu	21	Miss Ala Moana	Piano, "Scherzo Humoristique: The Cat and the Mouse" by Aaron Copland			Sister of Georgia Engel
1966	Lorretta Ann Perreira	Kauai	18	Miss West Kauai	Pantomime Song & Dance			
1965	Roberta Rosaria Conlan	Honolulu	18	Miss Honolulu	Monologue, "Hawaiian History"			
1964	Leina'ala Ann Teruya	Honolulu	18	Miss Wai-Kahu	Interpretive Monologue "Footprints" from Leaves of a Grass House by Don Blanding	Top 10		
1963	Susan Pickering	Honolulu		Miss Honolulu	Combination Dance of Can-Can, Jazz & Freestyle Ballet with Art Display	2nd runner-up		
1962	Patricia Lei Anderson	Honolulu	19		Classical Vocal, "Un bel dì vedremo" from Madame Butterfly	4th runner-up	Preliminary Talent Award	
1961	Joan Whitney Vine	Honolulu	18	Miss Honolulu	Vocal Medley, "Ah! Je Veux Vivre" & "Thou Swell"	Top 10		
1960	Gabriella Haleakala'I	Honolulu	20		Hula			
1959	Gordean Leilehua Lee	Honolulu	20		Hula		Miss Congeniality	
1958	Georgietta Kahalelaukoa Parker	Honolulu			Hula			
1957	Sandra Lei Lauhiwa Forsythe	Honolulu			Hula			
1956	Jere Wright	Honolulu			Comedic Monologue from Gigi	Top 10	Preliminary Lifestyle & Fitness Award	
1955	Barbara Mamo Vieira	Honolulu			Vocal / Hula, "The Night Is Young"	Top 10	Miss Congeniality Preliminary Lifestyle & Fitness Award	Was later designated as Miss Hawaii World 1955 and was slated to compete at Miss World 1955, but did not compete due to lack of sponsorship.
1954	Gertrude Kapiolani Miller	Honolulu	21		Hula		Non-finalist Talent Award	Was also Miss Hawaii Universe 1954 and was slated to compete at Miss Universe 1954, but did not compete due to unknown reasons.
1953	Dorothy Leilani Ellis	Lihue			Hula			
1952	Beverly Kathleen Rivera	Honolulu			Hula	Top 10		
1951	Claire Katherine Heen	Honolulu			Hula		Miss Congeniality	
1950	Dell-Fin Kala’upaona Po’aha	Honolulu					Miss Congeniality	
1949	Bee Jay Johnston	Honolulu				Top 15		
1948	Yun Tau Zane	Honolulu			Hula		Miss Congeniality	First Asian American to compete at Miss America Became Miss Hawaii after Waiwaiole resigned
1948	Irmgard Waiwaiole	Honolulu				N/A		
1935-47	No Hawaii representative at Miss America pageant							
1934	No national pageant was held							
1933	No Hawaii representative at Miss America pageant							
1932	No national pageants were held							
1931	No national pageants were held							
1930	No national pageants were held							
1929	No national pageants were held							
1928	No national pageants were held							
1927	No Hawaii representative at Miss America pageant							
1926	No Hawaii representative at Miss America pageant							
1925	No Hawaii representative at Miss America pageant							
1924	No Hawaii representative at Miss America pageant							
1923	No Hawaii representative at Miss America pageant							
1922	No Hawaii representative at Miss America pageant							
1921	No Hawaii representative at Miss America pageant							
