= Miss America 1965 =

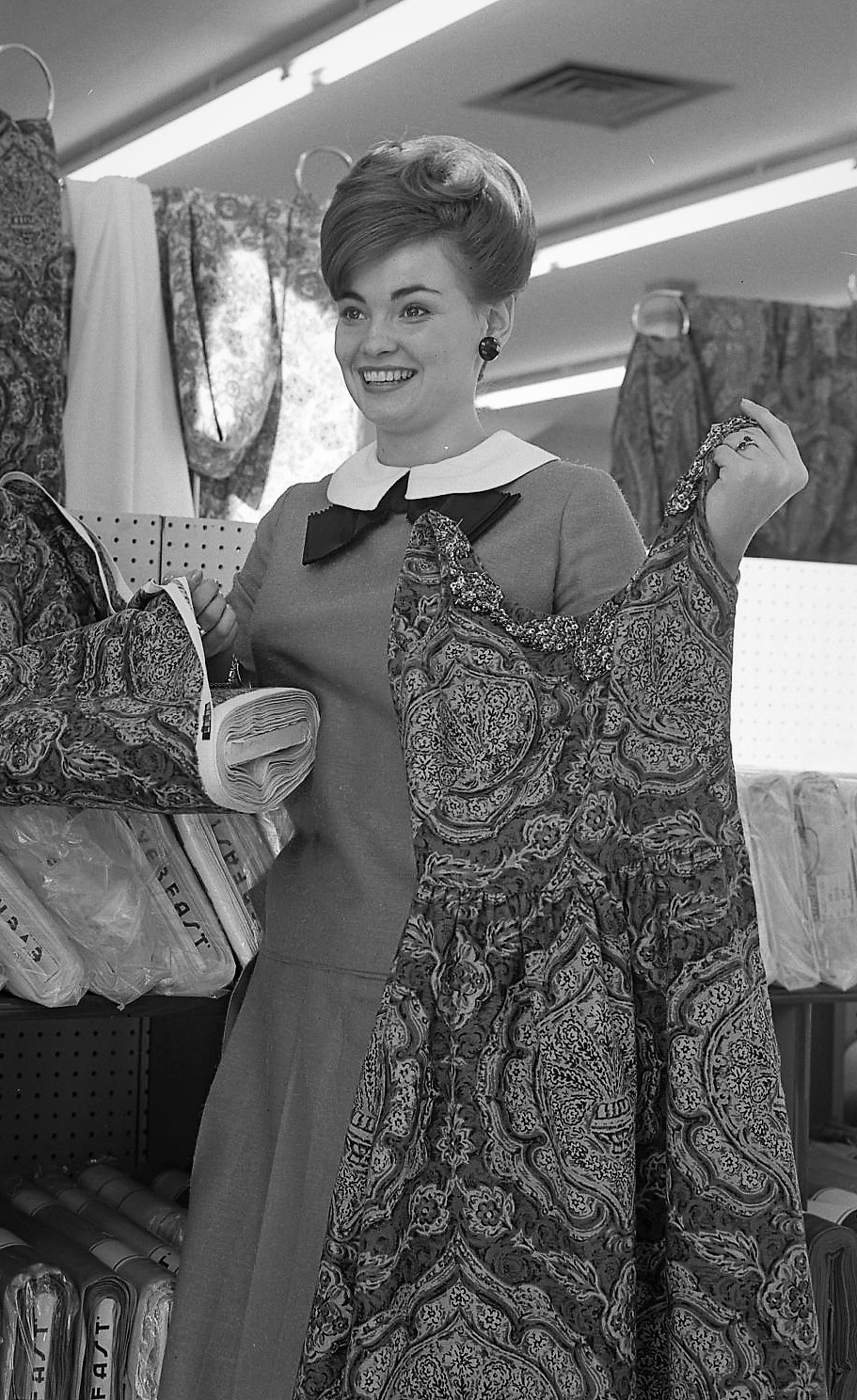
- Miss America of 1965, Vonda Kay Van Dyke, at a fabric store in Los Angeles
- Date: September 12, 1964
- Presenters: Bert Parks; Bess Myerson
- Venue: Boardwalk Hall, Atlantic City, New Jersey
- Broadcaster: CBS
- Winner: Vonda Kay Van Dyke; Arizona

Miss America 1965, the 38th Miss America pageant, was held at the Boardwalk Hall in Atlantic City, New Jersey on September 12, 1964 on the CBS Network.

Pageant winner Vonda Kay Van Dyke authored books in years to come. She was the first Miss America to use ventriloquism in the talent portion of the contest. Miss Arkansas, first runner-up Karen Carlson, later became an actress, seen in several films and many television series.

The pageant took place at Boardwalk Hall less than two weeks after it played host to the Democratic National Convention.

== Results ==
=== Placements ===
Placement	Contestant
Miss America 1965	Arizona – Vonda Kay Van Dyke
1st Runner-Up	Arkansas – Karen Carlson
2nd Runner-Up	West Virginia – Ella Kessel
3rd Runner-Up	Texas – Sharon McCauley
4th Runner-Up	Minnesota – Barbara Hasselberg
Top 10	Alabama – Vicki Jane Powers; Hawaii – Leinaala Ann Teruya; Kentucky – Linda Lenora Sawyer; New Mexico – Jane Nelson; Washington – Lauren Elaine Waddelton

=== Top 10 ===
1. Texas
2. Arizona
3. Alabama
4. New Mexico
5. Washington
6. Hawaii
7. Minnesota
8. Kentucky
9. West Virginia
10. Arkansas

=== Top 5 ===
1. Arizona
2. Arkansas
3. Minnesota
4. Texas
5. West Virginia

=== Awards ===
==== Preliminary awards ====
Awards	Contestant
Lifestyle and Fitness	California - Sherri Lee Raap; New Mexico - Jane Nelson; West Virginia - Ella Kessel
Talent	Alabama - Vickie Jane Powers; North Dakota - Karen Victoria Kopseng; Minnesota - Barbara Hasselberg

=== Other awards ===
Awards	Contestant
Miss Congeniality	Arizona - Vonda Kay Van Dyke
Non-finalist Talent	Alaska - Karol Hommon; Idaho - Judith Steubbe; Louisiana - Cherie Martin; Michigan - Sarah Jane Noble; (New York (state)) New York - Julie Just; Virginia - Carolyn Eddy

== Contestants ==
State	Name	Hometown	Age	Talent	Placement	Awards	Notes
Alabama	Vickie Powers	Mobile	19	Classical Vocal, "Habanera"	Top 10	Preliminary Talent Award	Featured performer at Miss America 1966
Alaska	Karol Hommon	Anchorage	20	Acrobatic & Modern Jazz Dance		Non-finalist Talent Award	Died in 1965 after falling from Sugarloaf Mountain
Arizona	Vonda Kay Van Dyke	Phoenix	22	Ventriloquism, "Together (Wherever We Go)"	Winner	Miss Congeniality	Semi-finalist at America's Junior Miss 1961 Only Miss America to also be named Miss Congeniality
Arkansas	Karen Carlson	Fayetteville	20	Vocal, "As Long as He Needs Me" from Oliver!	1st runner-up		Ex-wife of David Soul
California	Sherri Raap	Fremont	18	Jazz Baton Dance & Acrobatics		Preliminary Lifestyle & Fitness Award	
Colorado	Kathleen Knight	Denver	19	Semi-classical Vocal, "The Telephone"			
Connecticut	Honora Bukowski	Wallingford	18	Jazz Dance, "Bossa Nova"			
Delaware	Anita Gail Euban	Wilmington	20	Popular Vocal & Dance			
Florida	Priscilla Schnarr	Hollywood	18	Vocal/Dance, "Whatever Lola Wants"			
(Georgia (U.S. state)) Georgia	Vivian Davis	Augusta	19	Skit & Vocal			
Hawaii	Leina'ala Ann Teruya	Honolulu	18	Interpretive Monologue, "Footprints" from Leaves of a Grass House by Don Blanding	Top 10		
Idaho	Judith Steubbe	Moscow	21	Piano, Fantaisie-Impromptu		Non-finalist Talent Award	
Illinois	Patricia Louis Quillen	North Aurora	21	Clarinet			Finalist at the National Press Photographers' Pageant 1962. Patricia Louis (Quillen) Brannen died at age 83 on April 26, 2026 in Geneva, Illinois.
Indiana	Sandra Miller	Bedford	20	Popular Vocal			
Iowa	Carol Johnson	Ames	21	Folk Vocal & Guitar			
Kansas	Sharon Margene Savage	Florence	20	Vocal, "Johnny One Note" & "Ritorna Vincitor" from Aida			During her reign she was killed in an automobile accident near Peabody, Kansas
Kentucky	Linda Sawyer	Louisville	21	Vocal & Speech, "Stephen Foster Medley"	Top 10		Older sister of newscaster Diane Sawyer
Louisiana	Cherie Martin	Pineville	19	Toreador Dance & Baton Twirling		Non-finalist Talent Award	
Maine	Ellen Warren	Kennebunk	18	Vocal/Dance			
Maryland	Donna Marie McCauley	Rockville	19	Interpretive Ballet			
Massachusetts	Kathleen Kenneally	Whitman	21	Dramatic Reading			
Michigan	Sarah Jane Noble	East Lansing	18	Free Exercise Routine		Non-finalist Talent Award	
Minnesota	Barbara Hasselberg	Bloomington	21	Authentic Polynesian Dances, "Hawaiian War Chant"	4th runner-up	Preliminary Talent Award	
Mississippi	Judy Simono	Vicksburg	20	Classical Ballet, The Sleeping Beauty by Tchaikovsky			
Missouri	Carol Browning	Lee's Summit	20	Marimba & Accordion Medley			
Montana	Merilee Miller	Radersburg	20	Dance			
Nebraska	Sandra Lee Rice	Cozad	20	Dramatic Reading from After the Fall			
Nevada	Ellen Roseman	Sparks	21	Comedy Skit			
New Hampshire	Elizabeth Emerson	Somersworth	22	Comedy Reading			
New Jersey	Susan Krasnomowitz	Fair Lawn	19	Jazz Dance			
New Mexico	Jane Nelson	Tularosa	19	Original Vocal with Guitar & Tympani to the theme from Exodus	Top 10	Preliminary Lifestyle & Fitness Award	Later Miss Arizona USA 1965 1st runner-up at Miss USA 1965 Later Miss New Mexico World 1966 Top 7 at Miss USA World 1966
(New York (state)) New York	Julie Just	Buffalo	20	Popular Vocal, "Any Place I Hang My Hat is Home"		Non-finalist Talent Award	
North Carolina	Sharon Finch	Thomasville	20	Vocal & Dance with Castanets			
North Dakota	Karen Kopseng	Bismarck	19	Classical Vocal, "Un Bel Dì" from Madama Butterfly		Preliminary Talent Award	
Ohio	Diane Courtwright	Columbus	19	Popular Vocal & Modern Jazz Dance			
Oklahoma	Jane Hitch	Guymon	18	Dance			
Oregon	Carol Pedersen	Newport	18	Dramatic Reading			
Pennsylvania	Marilyn Cutaiar March	Havertown	19	Toe Dance Ballet, "Dance of the Painted Doll"			
Rhode Island	Judy Anderson	Warwick	20	Vocal/Dance			
South Carolina	Sue Smith	Florence	20	Vocal Medley			
South Dakota	June Ann Delbridge	Sioux Falls	19	Piano			
Tennessee	Rita Munsey	New Tazewell	20	Vocal Medley & Accordion, "You Don't Know Me" & "Walkin' After Midnight"			
Texas	Sharon McCauley	Athens	20	Vocal, "Let Me Entertain You" from Gypsy: A Musical Fable	3rd runner-up		
Utah	Lois Anne Bailey	Salt Lake City	18	Piano, "Symphonie espagnole"			
Vermont	Jean Conner	Rutland	21	Popular Vocal			
Virginia	Carolyn Eddy	Norfolk	21	Dramatic Reading		Non-finalist Talent Award	
(Washington (state)) Washington	Lauren Waddleton	Burien	19	Vocal. "I Could Have Danced All Night" from My Fair Lady	Top 10		
West Virginia	Ella Dee Kessel	Ripley	21	Piano, "Three Preludes" by Gershwin	2nd runner-up	Preliminary Lifestyle & Fitness Award	Later First Lady of WV
Wisconsin	Angela Baldi	Glendale	18	Piano, "On Wisconsin" in Three Variations			
Wyoming	Joan Selmer	Cheyenne	21	Acro-Baton Routine			
