= Michelle Anderson =

American lawyer and scholar (born 1967)

Maui County Council member (South Maui residency area)
- In office January 3, 2005 – January 2, 2009
- Preceded by: Wayne Nishiki
- Succeeded by: Wayne Nishiki

Personal details
- Occupation: Politician, author

American politician and author

Michelle Anderson is an American former politician and author who represented the South Maui residency area on the Maui County Council from 2005 to 2009. During her two terms, she chaired the council's Water Resources Committee and helped enact water-supply legislation, including the 2007 water-availability policy commonly called the "Show Me the Water" ordinance. She later published The Storied Places of West Maui (2016), a book based on research by local historian Inez Ashdown.

== Early life and career ==
Anderson was born in Iowa and raised in California. She moved to Maui in the early 1980s, where she established and operated several small businesses, including an import collections store. In the 1990s she worked as a planner for a Hawaiʻi state environmental-quality office. From 1998 until 2005, she served as a legislative analyst for Maui County Council member Wayne Nishiki.

In that role, Anderson worked with Nishiki on land-use and public-access questions. A 2004 Honolulu Star-Bulletin report described their work to secure additional public parking as part of a zoning change at the Makena Resort, in connection with access to the shoreline.

== Political career ==
=== Election and council service ===
Nishiki was ineligible to run again in 2004 under the county's consecutive-term limit and endorsed Anderson to succeed him. She was one of eight candidates seeking the South Maui seat in the nonpartisan primary election. In the general election, she defeated businessman Ron Vaught with 22,121 votes to his 18,309.

Following her election, Anderson identified public shoreline access, agricultural-land subdivisions and enforcement of community plans as priorities. She described herself as neither a Democrat nor a Republican. She was reelected in 2006 without an opponent on the general-election ballot.

=== Water policy ===
Anderson chaired the council's Water Resources Committee throughout her time in office. In 2006, the council enacted Ordinance No. 3404, prohibiting water from the Hamakuapoko Wells 1 and 2 from being supplied for human consumption because of concerns about agricultural contaminants. The Water Resources Committee had considered the well-water restrictions during Anderson's chairmanship.

Anderson also introduced and advanced the 2007 water-availability measure known as "Show Me the Water", which required applicants for certain subdivision approvals to demonstrate a long-term, reliable water supply. The policy became a subject of debate in later years: in 2015, county officials considered repeal after critics argued that it impeded construction of affordable housing, while its stated purpose was conserving limited water resources.

A 2008 county resolution also credited Anderson with work on an ordinance requiring private water users to report their water use. In September of that year, her committee recommended an odd-day/even-day outdoor-irrigation restriction, with exceptions including some agricultural uses; the proposal was referred to the full council for consideration.

=== Land use and environmental issues ===
Anderson was among the councilmembers who opposed the 2008 approval of the Honuaʻula/Wailea 670 development in South Maui, which passed by a 5–4 vote. During deliberations she questioned whether the project's zoning conditions could remain effective as its construction proceeded over many years. A later decision of the Supreme Court of Hawaii described amendments she proposed concerning the development, including a bond-or-cash-deposit condition intended to secure compliance with zoning requirements that received an initial unanimous council vote.

Anderson also addressed Native Hawaiian water rights and stream protection. In January 2007, she transmitted a proposed council resolution supporting a petition to designate Nā Wai ʻEhā as a surface-water management area. The state water commission made that designation in March 2008. The county council's 2008 resolution separately credited her with supporting the restoration of East Maui streams and introducing legislation concerning Native Hawaiian water entitlements.

The same council resolution stated that Anderson had worked with U.S. Representative Mazie Hirono toward approximately $185,000 in federal support for the restoration of the coral reefs of Māʻalaea Bay. A federal appropriation of $184,815 for a study of the bay's reef decline was later reported in 2009.

=== Departure from office ===
In July 2008, Anderson announced that she would not seek a third council term, citing family considerations. Nishiki won the South Maui seat in the November 2008 election and succeeded her when her term ended in January 2009.

== Writing ==
In 2016, Anderson published The Storied Places of West Maui: History, Legends, and Place Names of the Sunset Side of Maui, drawing on the research of historian Inez Ashdown into traditional place names and the histories associated with them. The book was published as part of the West Maui Book Series. A 2026 Maui Now report described it as an early title in the series and discussed Anderson's work in compiling Ashdown's research.
