= Miss Hawaii's Teen =

Beauty contest in Hawaii, US

- Formation: 2005
- Type: Beauty pageant
- Headquarters: Kaneohe
- Location: Hawaii
- Members: Miss America's Teen
- Official language: English
- Website: Official website

For the state pageant affiliated with Miss Teen USA, see Miss Hawaii Teen USA

The Miss Hawaii's Teen competition is the pageant that selects the representative of the U.S. state of Hawaii in the Miss America's Teen pageant.

Tianna Lei Wailehua of Waipahu was crowned Miss Hawaii's Teen on June 18, 2026, at the Hawaii Theatre in Honolulu, Hawaii. She competed for the title of Miss America's Teen 2027 on September 5, 2026, at the Kravis Center for the Performing Arts in West Palm Beach, Florida.

In January 2023, the official name of the pageant was changed from Miss Hawaii's Outstanding Teen, to Miss Hawaii's Teen, in accordance with the national pageant.

== Results summary ==
The year in parentheses indicates the year of Miss America's Outstanding Teen the award/placement was garnered.

=== Placements ===
- Top 11: Ilima Sexton (2022), Lauryn Trader (2024), Nicole McClain (2025), Tianna Lei Wailehua (2027)

=== Awards ===
==== Non-finalist awards ====
- Non-finalist Talent: Maia Mayeshiro (2018)

==== Other awards ====
- Miss Congeniality/Spirit of America: Lena Merrill (2011), Sophia Stark (2019)
- Outstanding Instrumental Talent: Maia Mayeshiro (2018)
- Top Dance Talent: Kylee Amoroso Kawamoto (2023)

== Winners ==
- Declared as winner
- Ended as a runner-up
- Ended as a finalist or semi-finalist

Year	Name	Hometown	Age	Local title	Talent	Placement at MAO Teen	Special scholarships at MAO Teen	Notes
2026	Tianna Lei Wailehua	Waipahu	18	Miss Oʻahu‘s Teen	Tahitian Dance	Top 11		
2025	Anya Teruya	Kaimukī	15	Miss Kaimuki's Teen	Classical Ballet			
2024	Nicole McClain	Oʻahu	17	Miss Nuuanu's Teen	Vocal	Top 11	AHA Go Red for Women Leadership Award (Overall Winner)	
2023	Lauryn Trader	Makiki	18	Miss Manoa's Teen	Tahitian Dance	Top 11		
2022	Kylee Amoroso-Kawamoto	Kaneohe	15		Contemporary Dance, "Body Love"		Top Dance Talent Award	
2021	Ilima Sexton	Ewa Beach	15		Hip Hop Dance, "Fallin'"	Top 11		
2019-20	Makaila Natividad	Kapolei	15		Lyrical Dance, "Carry You"			
2018	Sophia Stark	Honolulu	13	–	Vocal, "Juliet's Waltz"		Spirit of America Award	Appeared on MasterChef Junior. Semi-finalist at Miss Hawaii Teen USA 2020. Later Miss Hawaii Teen Volunteer 2022 and 3rd Runner Up at Miss Volunteer Teen America 2022.
2017	Maia Mayeshiro	Honolulu	16	–	Ukelele		Outstanding Instrumental Talent Award Non-finalist Talent Award	
2016	Carly Yoshida	Waikoloa	17		Hula			Later Miss Hawaii 2026
2015	Kealani Tanizaki-Hudson	Honolulu	16	–	Lyrical Dance			4th runner-up at Miss Hawaii Teen USA 2015 pageant 1st runner-up at Miss Hawaii Teen USA 2017 pageant
2014	Tarah Driver	St. Louis Heights	15	Miss East Oahu's Outstanding Teen	Lyrical Dance			
2013	Hayley Cheyney Kane	Kaneohe	16		Hula, “Imagine” by Nohelani Cypriano			Later placed 1st runner up in Miss Hawaii 2023; Later Miss Hawaii 2024
2012	Hulali Brown	Maui			Hula			
2011	Briana Garrido	Oahu						
2010	Lena Merrill	Wailuku	15		Lyrical Monologue using American Sign Language		Spirit of America Award	First deaf person to compete for the title of Miss America's Outstanding Teen
2009	Napua Salbedo	Makawao	17	Miss Maui's Outstanding Teen	Contemporary Tahitian Hip Hop Dance			
2008	Hali'alani Parish	Ewa Beach	15		Piano/Vocal, "Wind Beneath My Wings"			3rd runner-up at the Miss Hawaii 2015 pageant
2007	Moani Hara	Honolulu						Later Miss Hawaii USA 2014
2006	Katrina Kem	Wahiawa	16		Piano/Vocal			
2005	Jalee Kate Fuselier	Haleiwa	17		Vocal			Later Miss Hawaii 2010; 2nd runner-up at Miss America 2011 pageant
