= Prelude in A-flat major (Rachmaninoff) =

Composition by Sergei Rachmaninoff

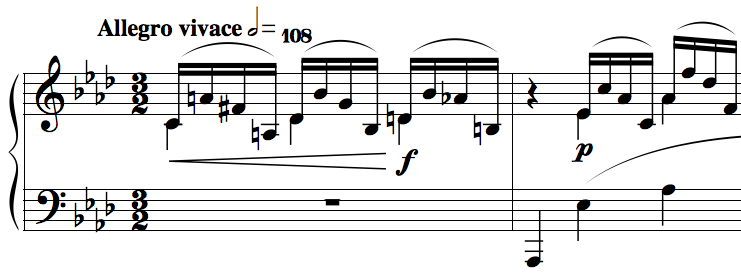
A florid, étude-like figure repeats and evolves throughout the eighth Prelude.

The Prelude in A♭ major, Op. 23, No. 8, is a 1903 composition by Sergei Rachmaninoff. It is part of Rachmaninoff's Ten Preludes, Op. 23.

== Structure ==
The work is three-part ternary; however, it assumes monothematic characteristics. The first occurrence Section A comprises measures 1–19, Section B of 19–43, Section A returns from measures 43–70, and the coda is placed at measures 70–78.

A right hand figuration extends over a descending quarter-note melody in the first two bars, outlining the A♭ chord. This motive repeats, and then is varied in measures 5–8, in succession. From measures 9–18, the section is restated though a transient modulation to E major (at measure 15). An imperfect cadence in the tonic bridges the transitory gap in measure 18 to the B section in E♭.

Measures 19–20 introduce a variant of the main motive. Now in a new key, the bass melody changes, descending chromatically in an eighth-note figure.

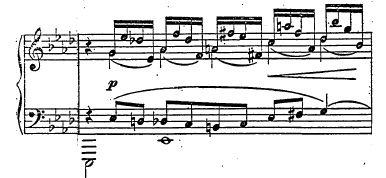
Measure 19

A transition section comes together though the combination of ascending and descending chromatic scale fragments at measures 31–41. Measures 30 and 31 contain a subtle but clear motive (in the left hand) that reappears again (in a slightly different manner) in the 2nd Symphony (1st movement). Vertiginous modulations swing through E♭ – G – C – F – A♭ and B♭, before settling into E♭ at measures 39–41.

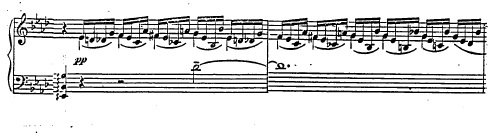
Measures 32 and 33

The original statement occurs beginning at measure 42, and then a progression at measures 54–62 through F- B♭ – D♭ and F minor provides a link to measures 61–70, where the harmonies become vague and indistinguishable:

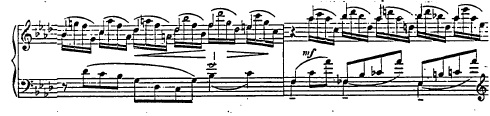
Measures 61 and 62

The coda exhibits a gradual breakdown of the forward motion, and, with a quarter-note progression in the final three bars, the A♭ tonality is reestablished.

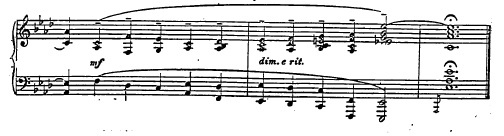
Measures 76–78

== Analysis ==
Some critics of this Prelude, such as John Culshaw, believe that the relentless, florid nature of the sixteenth-note figures extinguishes any expressive quality of the work. This could only be true for pianists who do not have mastery of clear and proper phrasing (which is abundant and well marked-out by the composer).
