= Prelude in G-flat major (Rachmaninoff) =

1903 composition by Sergei Rachmaninoff

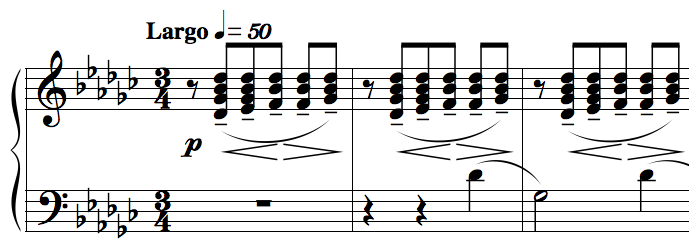
Lush chords and a Largo tempo marking quietly bookend Op.23

The Prelude in G♭ major, Op. 23 No. 10 is a 1903 composition by Sergei Rachmaninoff. It is part of Rachmaninoff's Ten Preludes, Op. 23.

== Structure ==
It is written in conventional ternary form. The main theme in the left hand is accompanied by syncopated chords in the right hand; it begins at measure 2 and ends at measure 6. A parallel period follows from measures 6–11, ending on an imperfect cadence. In measures 11–18, a sequential period that is based on the rhythm of the main theme follows. Soprano and bass track each other in this section:

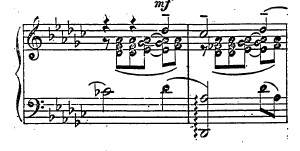
Measures 11 and 12

The "B" section, from measures 18–34, employs sequential fragments of the "A" section. Syncopated chords from the "A" section are elongated. Rising chromatic patterns are present in both the bass and treble. Consider measures 18–20 and 23–25:

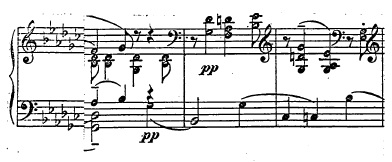
Measures 18–20

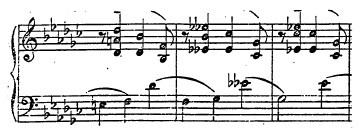
Measures 23–25

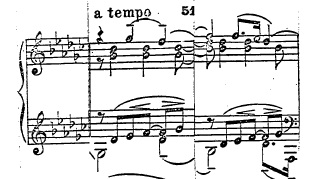
Measures 35 and 36

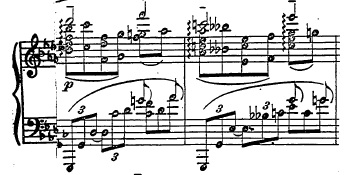
Measures 49 and 50

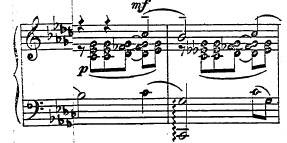
Measures 15 and 16
