= Prelude in E-flat minor (Rachmaninoff) =

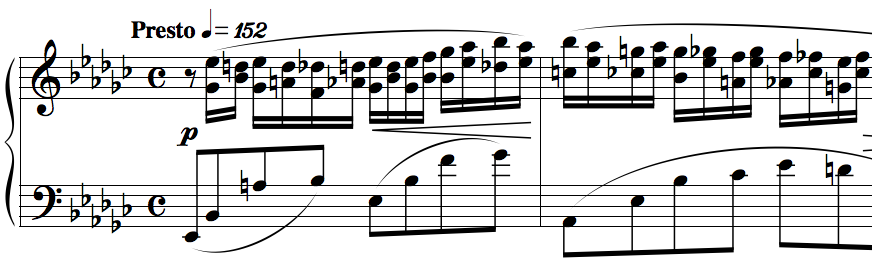
Complex chromatic sequences must be played presto.

The Prelude in E♭ minor, Op. 23 No. 9 is a 1903 composition by Sergei Rachmaninoff. It is part of Rachmaninoff's Ten Preludes, Op. 23, and is one of the most difficult of the set.

== Structure ==
A double note theme is announced in measures 1–4. The piece then modulates rapidly from bar to bar, passing through: G♭ (measure 5); C♭ (measure 6); A♭ minor (measure 7); and B♭ (measure 9). The primary melody returns at measure 11.

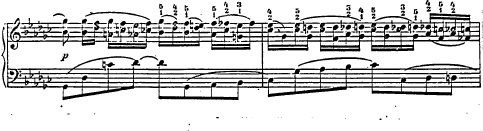
Measures 5 and 6

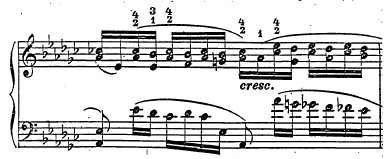
Measure 7

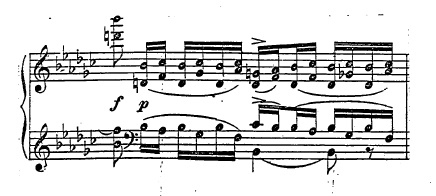
Measure 9

In measures 5–10 a number of thirds, sixths, seconds, and fourths make up the right hand melody. The left hand is an arpeggiated figure sporadically interrupted with minor seconds.

A reiteration of A occurs at measure 23.

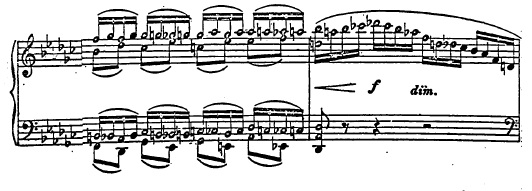
Measures 22 and 23

The theme occurs again, and then at measure 34, a completely new theme appears in the soprano.

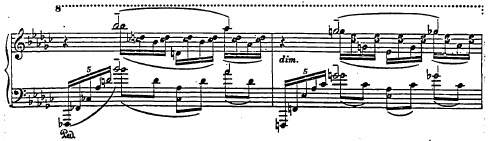
Measures 34 and 35

A series of descending chromatic sequences begins, and the work draws to a close in measure 50.

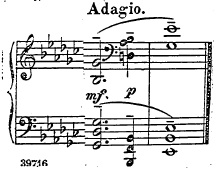
Measures 50 and 51
