= Leinaʻala Drummond =

Hawaiian businessperson and model (1946–2023)

Leinaʻala Ann Teruya Drummond
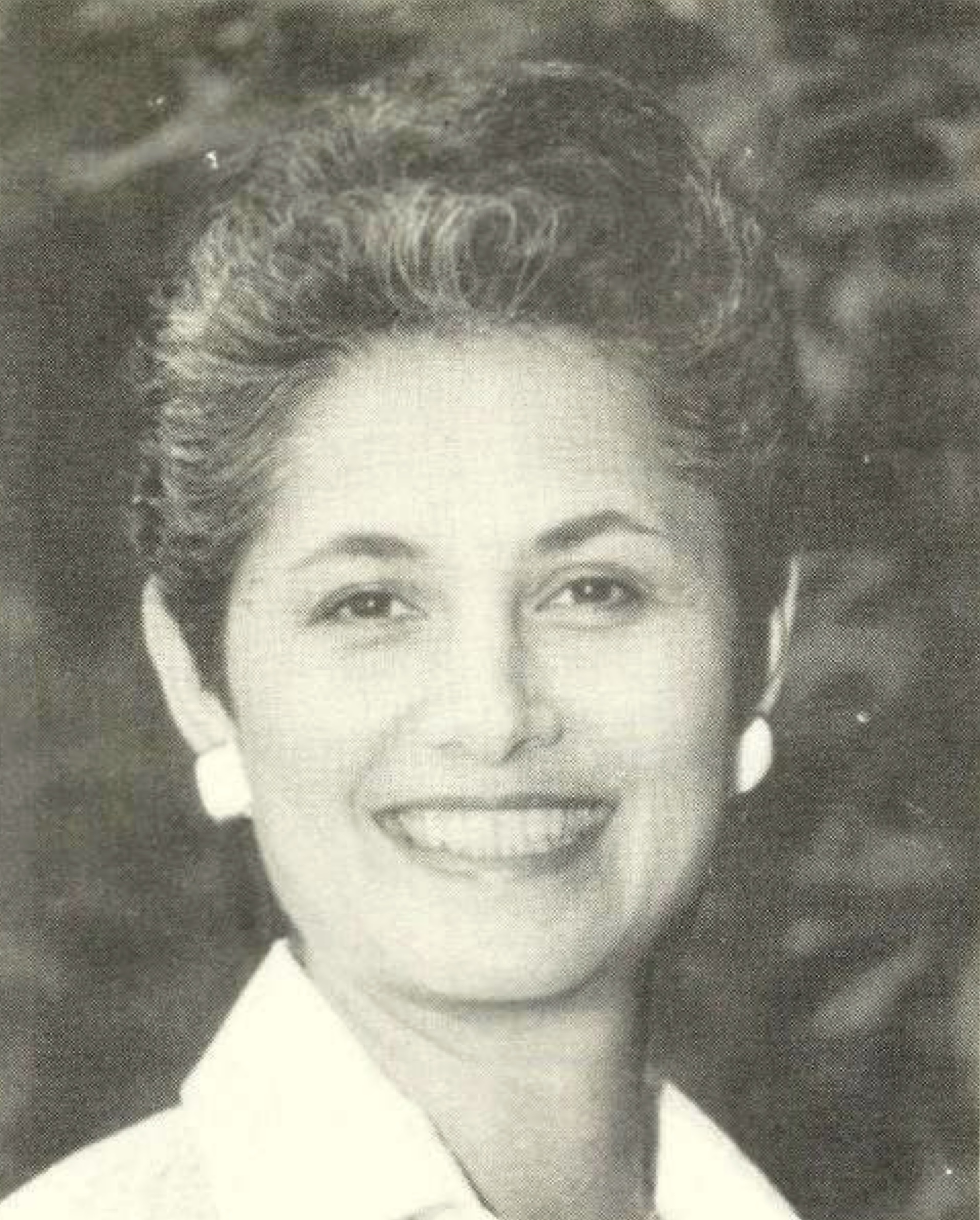
- Drummond ca. 1988
- Born: Leinaʻala Ann Teruya; May 28, 1946; Puʻunēnē, Hawaii
- Died: September 18, 2023 (aged 77); Hilo, Hawaii
- Resting place: 'Alae Cemetery, Hawaiʻi County, Hawaii
- Known for: Depiction in the logo of Hawaiian Airlines
- Awards: Miss Hawaii 1964

Leinaʻala Ann Teruya Drummond (May 28, 1946 – September 18, 2023) was an American model and businesswoman. Drummond won the 1964 Miss Hawaii competition, and is the model for the logo of Hawaiian Airlines, introduced in 1973.

A native of Maui, Drummond became Miss Hawaii 1964 and represented her state at the Miss America 1965 contest, placing in the top ten. After winning the Miss Hawaii title, Drummond worked for Hawaiian Airlines for 10 years. Later in life, Drummond served on the Maui County Council and became an ordained pastor.

== Biography ==
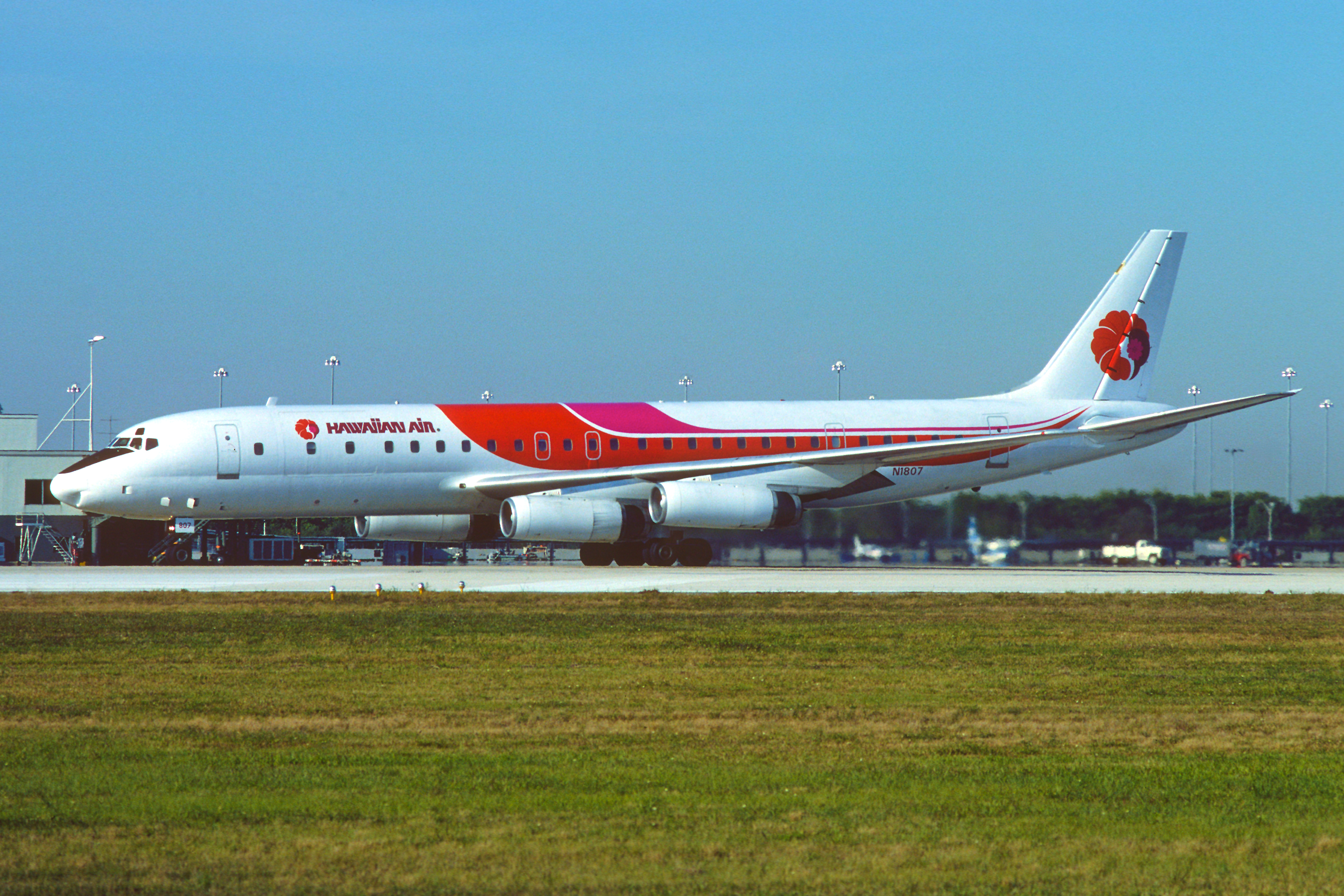
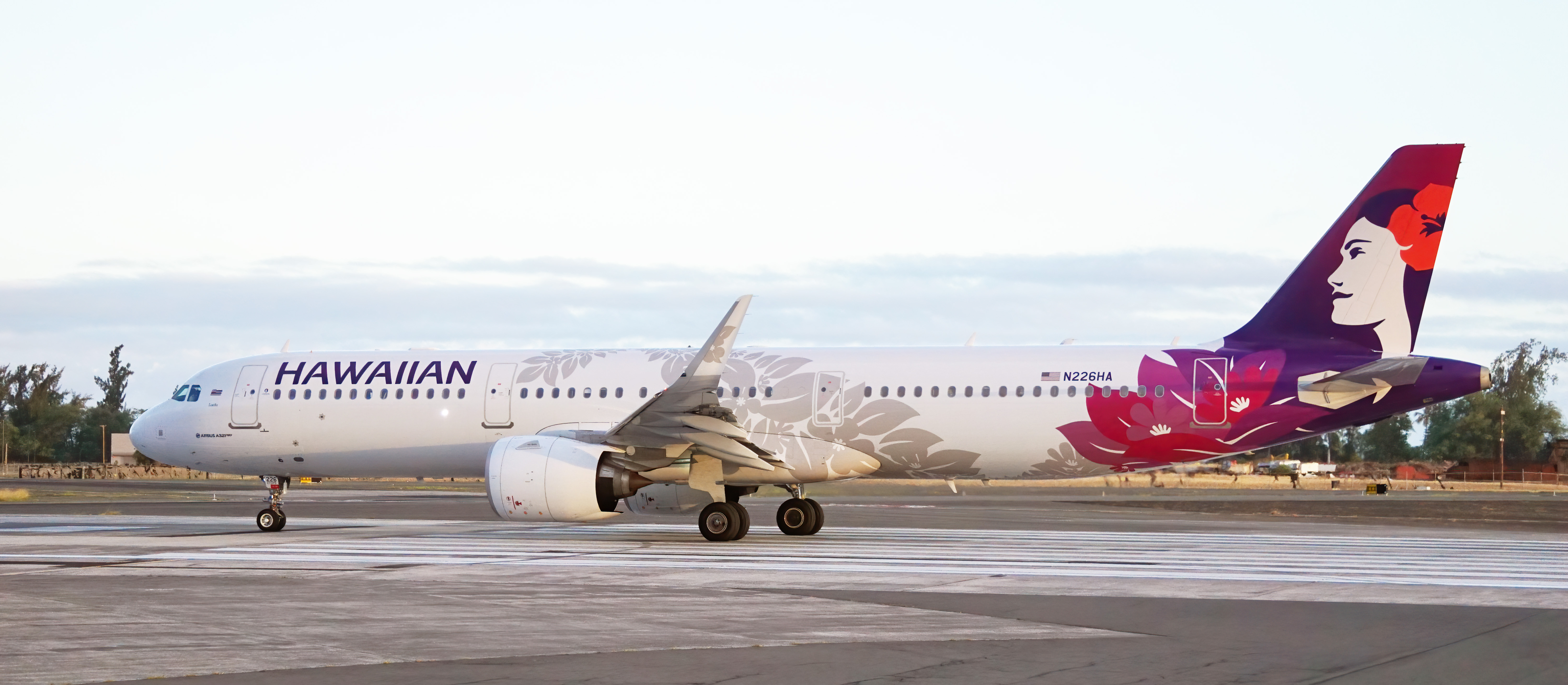
Drummond's likeness has appeared in multiple versions of the Hawaiian Airlines logo since 1973

Leina'ala Ann Teruya was born on May 28, 1946 in Puʻunēnē, Hawaii, on the island of Maui. Teruya and her seven siblings grew up on a truck farm in Kīhei, which was destroyed in a hurricane in the late 1950s. Teruya spent little time at her family's next home in the ʻĪao Valley, as she boarded at Kamehameha Schools on Oʻahu from 7th grade through high school.

Teruya graduated from high school in 1964, and entered that year's edition of the Miss Hawaii beauty pageant. She was the first winner of the Miss Hawaii pageant from the Neighbor Islands, and advanced to Miss America in 1965, where she placed in the top 10.

Teruya worked for Hawaiian Airlines for 10 years, briefly as a flight attendant and later in the airline's sales and marketing department. In 1973, the airline adopted a new logo featuring her likeness.

The mother of a son and daughter named Kawika and Christina, she was married to John Robert Drummond for 24 years, until his death in 2000. In her later life, LeinaʻAla Drummond served on the Maui County Council and became an ordained pastor. Drummond appeared on a radio program hosted by Danny Yamashiro in 2020, recounting her journey to Christianity and her work in business, politics, and advocacy.

Drummond died of cancer in Hilo on September 18, 2023, at the age of 77.
