= Prelude in F-sharp minor (Rachmaninoff) =

Composition by Sergei Rachmaninoff

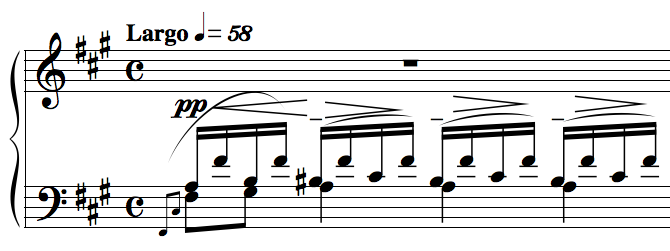
The rising and falling melodic pattern in the opening.

The Prelude in F♯ minor, Op. 23, No. 1 is a composition by Sergei Rachmaninoff completed and premiered in 1903. It is one of ten preludes composed by Rachmaninoff in 1901 and 1903.

== Structure ==
The prelude is ternary and homophonic in nature. The "A" section (measures 1–13) introduces the first theme, section "B" (13–30) introduces a new set of variations, and measures 30–41 mark an altered return to the original "A" theme. Each of the larger ternary sections contains its set of "micro-variations" marked by changes in note values, dynamics, and rhythm. For instance, the "A" theme, introduced in measures 1 and 2, is varied in measure 8.

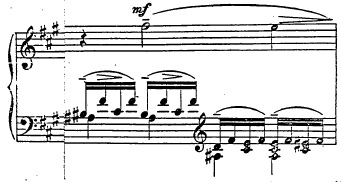
Measure 2
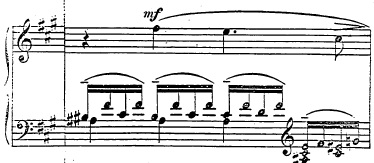
Measure 8

The Prelude proceeds from F♯ minor to the relative major (A major) in measure 13, and returns to the tonic in measure 30.

A "hidden" chromatic sequence in the "A" section occurs in the bass line on the second beat of measure 1 and the first beat of measures 2–6. This sequence is later revealed as the basis for the "B" theme, first introduced transitorily as a modulation between the "A" and "B" sections. Compare measures 6 and 24:

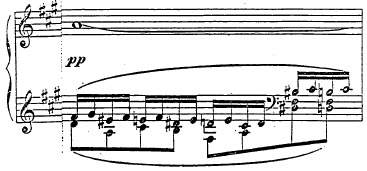
Measure 6

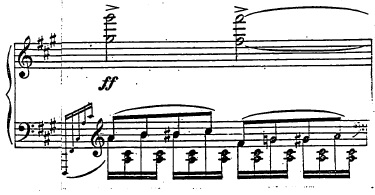

Measure 24
