= Prelude in G minor (Rachmaninoff) =

Piece of music by Sergei Rachmaninoff

The first measure introduces the prelude's idiosyncratic jumps.

The Prelude in G minor, Op. 23, No. 5, is a piece of music by Sergei Rachmaninoff, completed in 1901. It was included in his Opus 23 set of ten preludes, despite having been written two years earlier than the other nine. Rachmaninoff himself premiered the piece in Moscow on February 10, 1903, along with Preludes No. 1 and 2 from Op. 23.

== Structure ==
The Prelude's taut structure is in ternary form, consisting of an opening "A" section with punctuated sixteenth-note chords (marked: Alla marcia, march), a more lyrical and melancholy "B" section with sweeping arpeggios in the left hand (marked: Poco meno mosso), a transition into the original tempo, and a recapitulation of the initial march.

The Alla marcia section is in itself in ternary ABA form. Within the first three measures of the Prelude, Rachmaninoff introduces the unifying factors of the piece (notwithstanding the Poco meno mosso section). First, the chordal march of measure one; second, the fragment on the second half of the beat in measure two; third, the fragment on the second half of beat two in measure three.

— Measures 2 and 3

Measures 1–9 expand on the march theme. Following a cadence in the dominant, the section repeats in measures 10–16 with slight alterations and concludes in a G minor perfect cadence.

The "B" subsection of the Alla marcia section (measures 17–24) mirrors the rhythm of the first measure, presenting a sequence of related chords beginning with E♭.

— Measures 17 and 18

In contrast to the Alla marcia, the "B" section introduces a lyrical chordal melody over an extended arpeggiated figure. Beginning in measure 35, a two-measure phrase is repeated and then serially extended in measures 39–41. A counter melody appears at measure 42 in the middle voice, intensifying the passage.

— Measures 35–36

— Measure 42

Following the middle section, the Prelude transitions to a recapitulation of the march section by gradual increases in tempo and dynamics. The section uses chromatically upward moving chords following embellished diminished seventh figures.

— Measure 72

Finally, the piece ends in a highly original way: a short arpeggiated run to a high G, marked pianissimo.

— Measure 84

== Recordings ==
Rachaminov recorded one performance of the work, on a reproducing piano. This recording was published on the album "Masters of the Piano Roll".

Emil Gilels played this prelude at a front in World War II, in support for the Soviet military forces fighting in the war. The narrator says (in Russian): "Gilels is playing at the front, to remind us what the war is worth fighting for: Immortal music!"

This prelude is one of the most performed and recorded pieces of the Op. 23 set.
