= Miss Hawaii Teen USA =

Beauty pageant competition

- Formation: 1983
- Type: Beauty pageant
- Headquarters: Honolulu
- Location: Hawaii
- Members: Miss Teen USA
- Official language: English
- Website: Official website

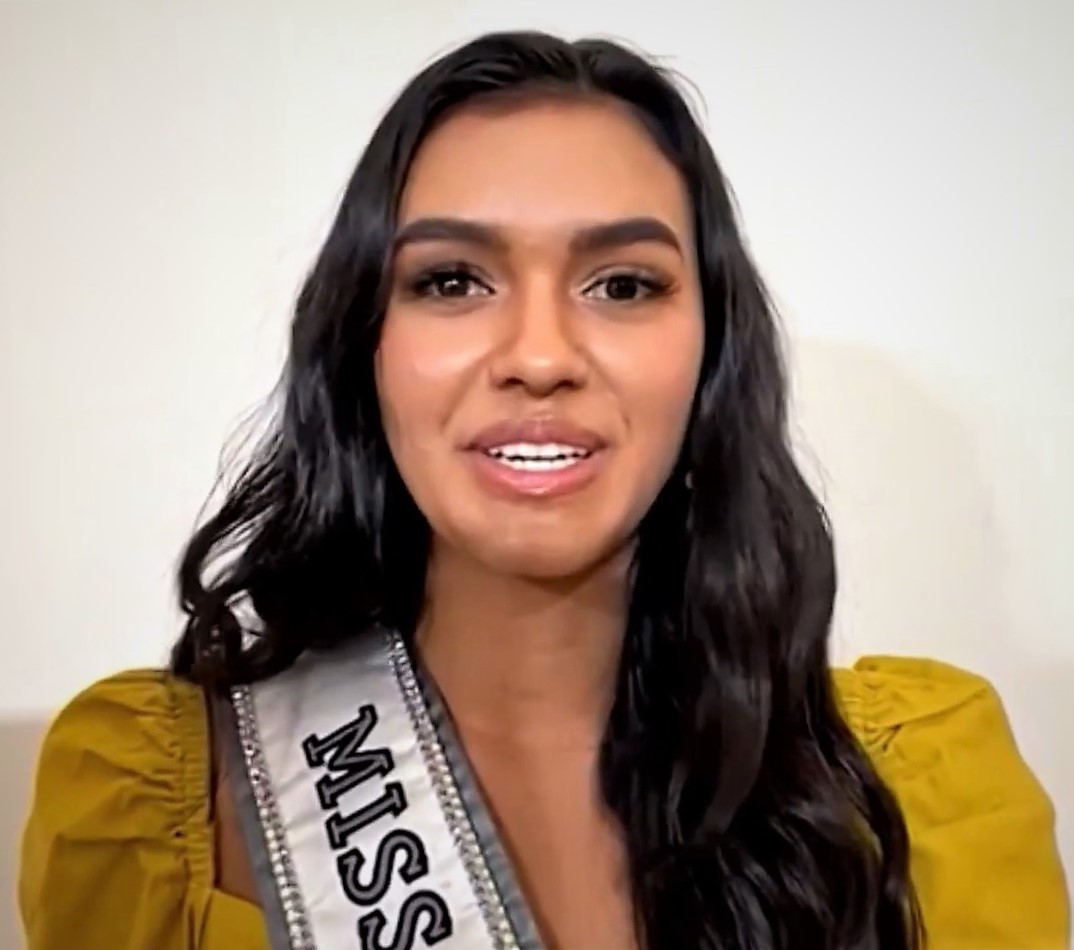
Ki'ilani Arruda, Miss Hawaii Teen USA and Miss Teen USA 2020

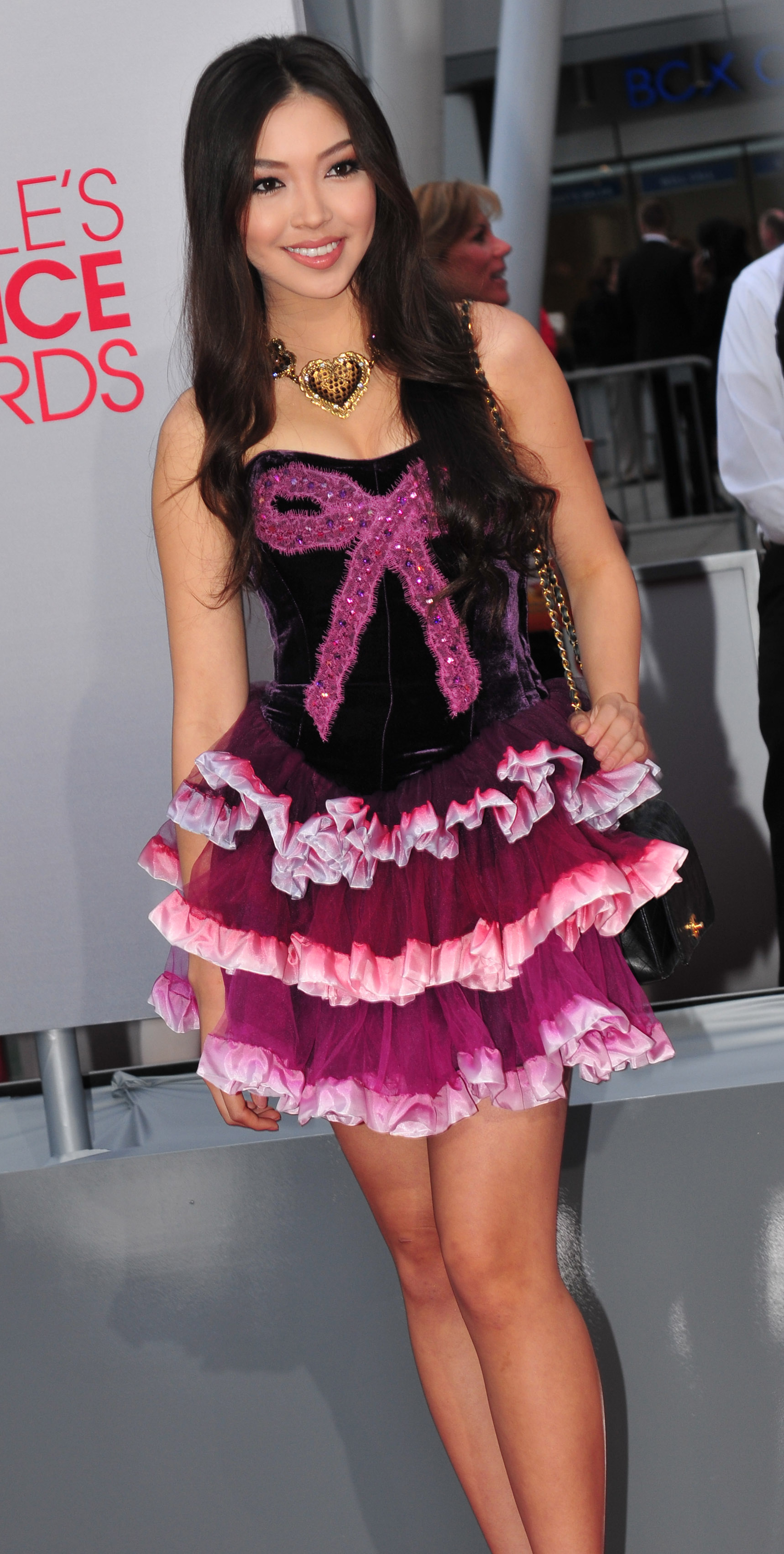
Courtney Coleman, Miss Hawaii Teen USA 2011

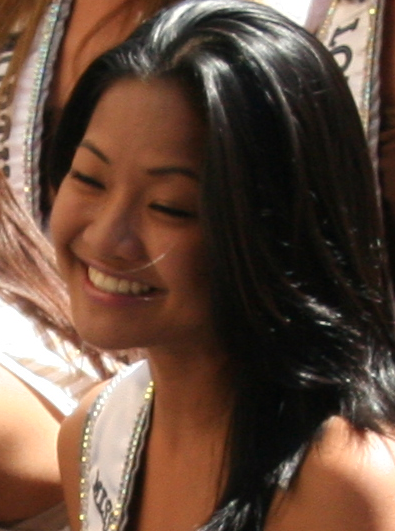
Serena Karnagy, Miss Hawaii Teen USA 2007

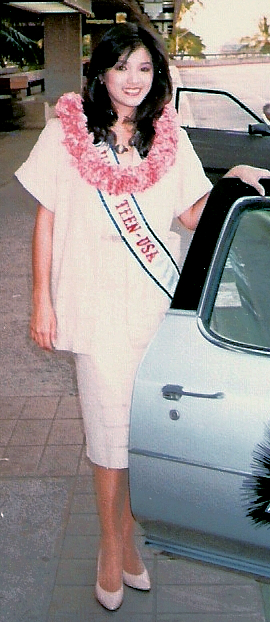
Kelly Hu, Miss Hawaii Teen USA 1985, prior to winning the Miss Teen USA 1985 title

The Miss Hawaii Teen USA competition is the pageant that selects the representative for the state of Hawaii in the Miss Teen USA pageant.

Although Hawaii has made the cut fewer times than many states, they have achieved a number of high placings. Hawaii Teen USAs have been quite successful at Miss Teen USA, and are ranked fifteenth in terms of number and value of placements and were ranked third in the 1980s . Kelly Hu won the competition in 1985 becoming the 3rd state that won the Miss Teen USA title for the first time and Kiʻilani Arruda won in 2020 becoming the 38th Miss Teen USA titleholder, while two other Hawaii teens have placed as first runner-up.

Kelly Hu was the first Hawaii teen to cross over to Miss Hawaii USA, and she was also the most successful. Only four other Teens have competed at Miss USA.

Olivia Tom of Maui was crowned Miss Hawaii Teen USA 2026 on May 15, 2026 at the Hawaii Convention Center in Honolulu. She will represent Hawaii in Miss Teen USA 2026.

== Results summary ==
=== Placements ===
- Miss Teen USA: Kelly Hu (1985), Kiʻilani Arruda (2020)
- 1st runners-up: Malia Yamamura (1984), Sonya Balmores (2004)
- 2nd runners-up: Mahana Walters (1997)
- Top 6: Juliana Kaulukukui (1993)
- Top 10: Camille Peraro (2003)
- Top 15/16: Serena Karnagy (2007), Kathryn Teruya (2012), Samantha Neyland (2013), Malulani Paiste (2022)

Hawaii holds a record of 11 placements at Miss Teen USA.

=== Awards ===
- Miss Congeniality: Juliana Kaulukukui (1993), Ashley Moser (2009)
- Miss Photogenic: Courtney Coleman (2011)

== Winners ==
- Declared as Winner
- Ended as runner-up
- Ended as one of the finalists or semifinalists

Year	Name	Hometown	Age^{1}	Local title	Placement at Miss Teen USA	Special awards at Miss Teen USA	Notes
2026	Olivia Tom	Maui	TBA	Miss Maui Teen			
2025	Sabrina Calma	Lahaina	19	Miss Lahaina Teen			
2024	Hokuaoka’ale Emma "Hokua" Gilman	Maui	19	Miss Maui Teen			
2023	NoeLani Denisi	Kahului	18	Miss Maui Teen			
2022	Malulani Paiste	Mililani	18	Miss Central Oahu Teen	Top 16		
2021	Tia Bustamante	Kaneohe	18	Miss Windward Teen			
2020	Kiʻilani Arruda	Kapaʻa	17	Miss Kauai Teen	Miss Teen USA 2020		2nd runner-up at Miss Hawaii Teen USA 2019
2019	Leimakamae Freitas	Honolulu	17	Miss Hawaii Island Teen			
2018	Kylyn Malia Rapoza	Hilo	17	Miss Hawaii Island Teen			
2017	Lauren Sueko Teruya	Kāhala	18	Miss Kāhala Teen			Sister of Miss Hawaii Teen USA 2012 and Miss Hawaii 2017 Kathryn Teruya; 4th runner-up at Miss Hawaii 2021; Later Miss Hawaii 2022 and Top 11 at Miss America 2023
2016	Joahnnalee Ucol	Maui	16	Miss Maui Teen			First 1st generation immigrant to be crowned Miss Hawaii Teen USA
2015	Kyla Hee	Honolulu	17	Miss Honolulu Teen			Daughter of Miss Hawaii 1987 Luana Alapa
2014	Mariah Gosling	Honolulu	18	Miss Honolulu Teen			
2013	Samantha Neyland	Honolulu	17		Top 16		First African American Miss Hawaii Teen USA; Later Miss Hawaii USA 2020; Top 10 at Miss USA 2020
2012	Kathryn Teruya	Kāhala	15		Top 16		Sister of Miss Hawaii Teen USA 2017, Lauren Teruya; Later Miss Hawaii 2017
2011	Courtney Coleman	Moanalua	17			Miss Photogenic	Represented Hawaii in Miss International 2017
2010	Julianne Chu	Kāhala	18				Later Miss Hawaii USA 2018; Sister of Miss Hawaii 2016 Allison Chu
2009	Ashley Maria Sagisi Moser	Hawai'i Kai	17			Miss Congeniality	
2008	Emily Colleen "Emma" Wo	Honolulu	18				Later Miss Hawaii USA 2015
2007	Serena Sison Karnagy	Honolulu	16		Top 15		Represented Hawaii in Miss International 2008.
2006	Hannah Keikiokanani Thomas	Honolulu	17				
2005	Melissa Marie Benz	Honolulu	18				
2004	Sonya Balmores	Kalaheo	18		1st runner-up		
2003	Camille Christine Peraro	Honolulu	17		Top 10		
2002	Erin Kahelelani Madden	Kailua	17				
2001	Alana Paulo-Tamashiro	Honolulu	16				
2000	Lauren Kristin Madden	Kailua	18				
1999	Aureana Kamaliʻiʻoʻiwalani Kim Len Tseu	Mililani	15				Later Miss Hawaii USA 2009
1998	Tobie Anne Pohaikealoha Carter	Hilo	17				
1997	Mahana Kaʻahumanu Walters	Pupukea	17		2nd runner-up		
1996	Monica Ivey	Mililani	17				
1995	Sara Michelle Hokuokalani Kirby						
1994	Emily Elizabeth Huff	Lāʻie	19				
1993	Juliana Maili Kaulukukui	Honolulu	18		Top 6	Miss Congeniality	
1992	Cameo DeCosta						
1991	Trini-Ann Leilani Kaopuiki		18				Later Miss Hawaii USA 1999
1990	Sunny Kanaiaupuni	Haleʻiwa	18				
1989	Paulette Dean		17				
1988	Michelle Wong	Honolulu	17				
1987	Leslie-Ann Kwailan Lum	Honolulu					Later 1st runner up at Miss Hawaii USA 1997.; Assumed the Miss Hawaii USA 1997 title when Brook Lee became Miss USA 1997 (later Miss Universe 1997).
1986	Donovan Canon				Did not compete		Originally first runner-up, assumed the title when Michele Hardin resigned
1986	Michele Hardin						Resigned in September 1986
1985	Kelly Ann Hu	Honolulu	16		Miss Teen USA 1985		Later Miss Hawaii USA 1993, finished 3rd runner-up at Miss USA 1993
1984	Malia Yamamura	Honolulu	16		1st runner-up		
1983	Erika Matich	Honolulu	15				

^{1} Age at the time of the Miss Teen USA pageant
