= Prelude in D minor (Rachmaninoff) =

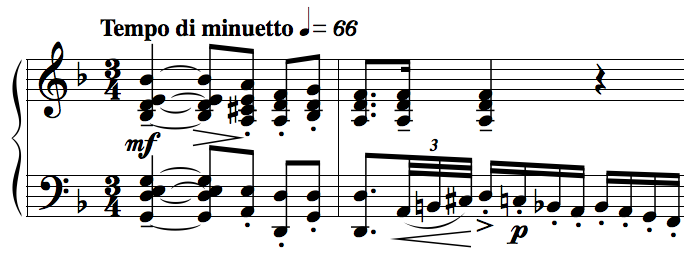
Deceptively minuet-like, the Prelude soon transcends its apparent form.

The Prelude in D minor, Op. 23 No. 3 is a composition by Sergei Rachmaninoff completed and premiered in 1903.

== Structure ==
The prelude is strictly ternary. In measure 8 (part of the "A" section), a parallel period with a semi-cadence is introduced, and in measure 16 a perfect authentic cadence follows. Reference to the "A" section cadence at measure 17:

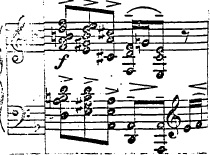
Measure 17

Following the reference, measures 1 and 2 are embellished to form the "B" section. Measures 42–62 mark a return to the "A" section, followed by relatively short coda that reflects the main theme.

Measures 3, 11, 35, show the chord progressions, i-III. In measure 11, the III chord is changed to an F-sharp dim. seventh chord, in measure 35, the i and III chords are presented more closely, and in measure 47 the III chord is replaced with a D minor seventh chord.

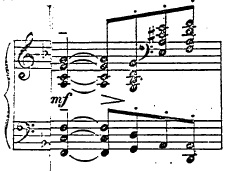
Measure 3

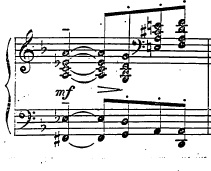
Measure 11

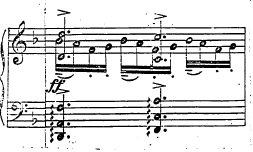
Measure 35

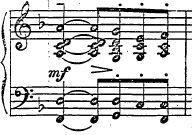
Measure 47

Many contrapuntal passages appear throughout the prelude: diminution at measure 28, augmentation at measure 75, stretto at measure 25, and fragmentation at measure 67.

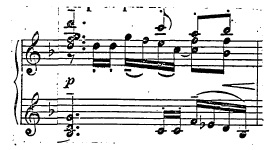
Measure 25
