= Prelude in C minor (Rachmaninoff) =

Composition by Sergei Rachmaninoff

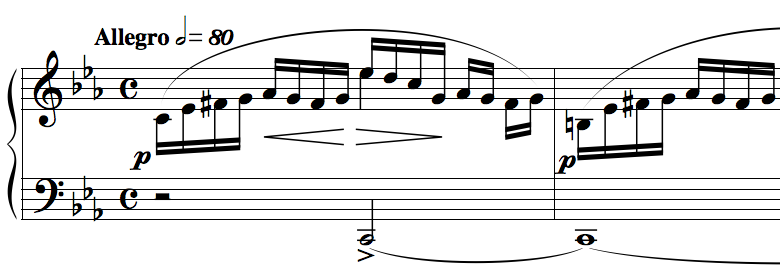
A Baroque sixteenth note theme anchors the seventh prelude.

The Prelude in C minor, Op. 23, No. 7 is a 1903 composition by Sergei Rachmaninoff. It is part of Rachmaninoff's Ten Preludes, Op. 23.

== Structure ==
While the form of this Prelude may at first appear to be ternary, the actual structure is in fact a distorted version of strict ternary form. The A section is a single phrase at measures 1–16 which repeats in measures 16–32. The sixteenth-note figure that spreads throughout the work is introduced in measure 1 over a tonic pedal point. The first note of each measure through measure 10 reveals a descending chromatic pattern, perhaps adding to the sense of dread or urgency of the work. Parallel to the descending first note of each line is another descending chromatic pattern on the melodic quarter-note on the third beat of each measure, creating interplay between the two parts.

Measures 13–16 outline the chromatic figure on the first beat of each measure in the left hand with similar suggestions in the treble half-notes.

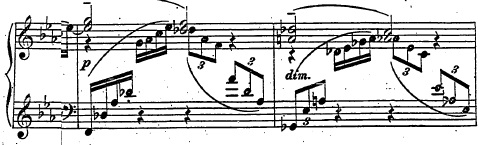
Measures 13 and 14

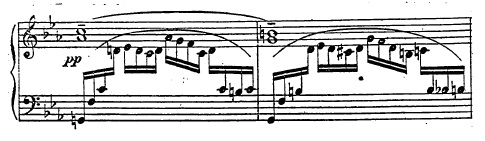
Measures 15 and 16

Following a cadence in C minor, the B section enters at measures 33 and continues to measure 37. The division consists of a descending half-note melody in the bass opposed by the sixteenth note accompaniment. The B section repeats serially at measures 37–41 and 41–44.

Measures 45–48 are a transition, composed of ascending chromatic octaves that form a quasi cadenza at measures 49–52.

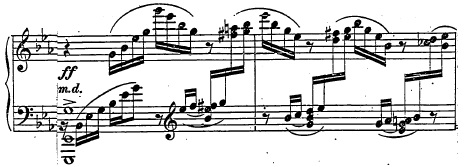
Measures 49 and 50

The "A section" returns at measure 53, but is varied with increased modulation, an arpeggiated left hand figure, and the addition of octaves

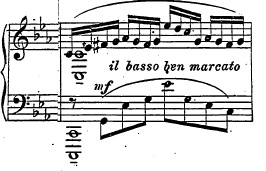
Measure 53

In measure 69, an unusual variation is introduced: the sixteenth-note motive overruns the augmentation of the fragmented theme.

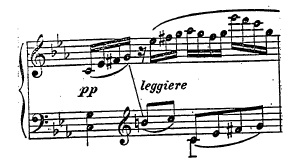
Measure 69

The passages that follow modulate in rapid succession through C minor – G- E flat – F – G – A flat – F minor – D flat – G and diminished and augmented chords in measures 83.

The Prelude ends in a series of embellishing diminished, half-diminished and dominant seventh chords which all contain the tonic note (C). The work draws shut with a perfect cadence.

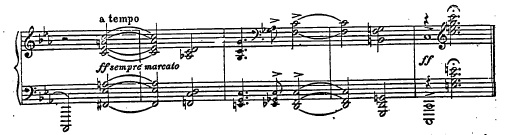

Measures 87–91
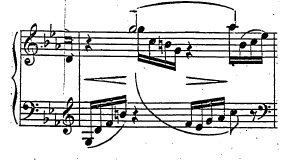

Measure 10

== Recordings ==
Many pianists have recorded all of the preludes or a selection of them, including Sviatoslav Richter.
