= Prelude in D major (Rachmaninoff) =

1903 musical work

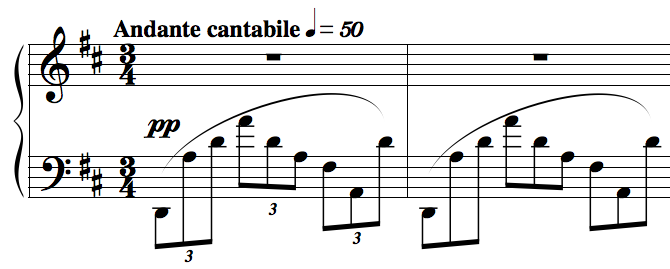
Opening bars of the prelude.

The Prelude in D major, Op. 23 No. 4 is a 1903 composition by Sergei Rachmaninoff. It is part of Rachmaninoff's Ten Preludes, Op. 23.

== Structure ==
The prelude is in ternary form. The theme of the main section is introduced in measure 3:

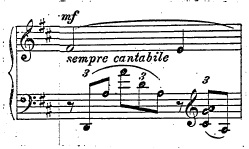
Measure 3

The theme is in the form of a period, composed of two symmetrical phrases, the consequent being a more embellished version of the antecedent, presenting a triplet descant in the treble voice above the main theme in the right-hand alto voice. The right-hand voices are offset against an eighth-note figure in the left-hand:

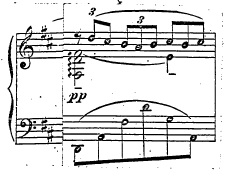
Measure 19

The middle section presents rhythmic changes and several modulations. Triplets appear in the accompaniment, and shorter phrasing is utilized:

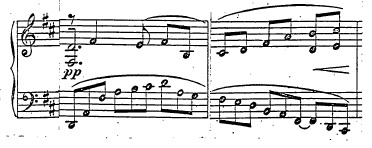
Measures 35 and 36

The piece reaches its climax at measures 50–51, and immediately resolves back into the main section:

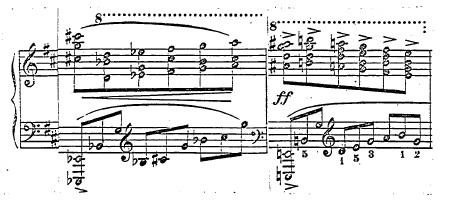
Measures 50 and 51

Here, the triplet flow returns to the left-hand bass line, while a high counterpoint is introduced in the main melody. Only the antecedent of the original phrase is recapitulated, lengthened by eight additional measures that provide closure.

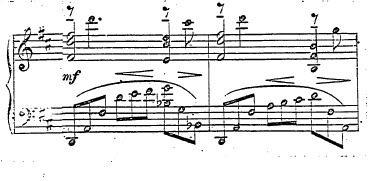
Measures 53 and 54

== Recordings ==
- YouTube Live Recording Live by Willis Miller (2012).
