= Prelude in E-flat major (Rachmaninoff) =

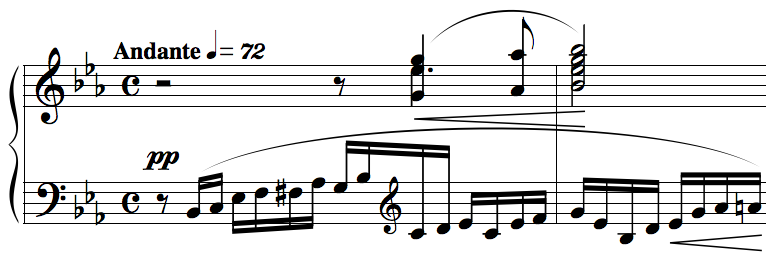
A three note melodic germ in the treble line repeats throughout the piece.

The Prelude in E♭ major, Op. 23, No. 6 is a 1903 composition by Sergei Rachmaninoff. It is part of Rachmaninoff's Ten Preludes, Op. 23.

== Structure ==
The E♭ major Prelude is written in a variation form. An extended sixteenth note accompaniment is offset by a three note reoccurring melodic germ in the right hand. The prelude is a serially reoccurring set of repetitions and variations.

Measures 1–9 establish the theme – a parallel period with a cadence in G minor – that continues throughout the piece. The theme is varied in measures 9–20 in G minor, F, E♭, A♭, F, and G. A repetition of the theme occurs at :Measure 21, and then is drastically simplified.

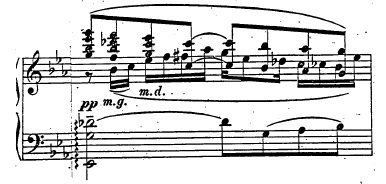
Measure 28

An exchange of ascending and descending chromatic sequences occurs at measures 31 and 32, offset contrapuntally by the changes of the primary theme.

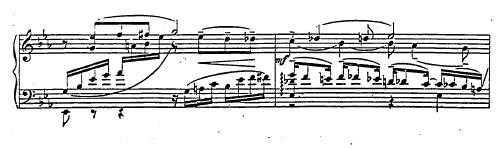
Measures 31 and 32

Towards the end of the Prelude, an emphasis is placed on the sixteenth note accompaniment, which expands into two hands, rising upward in a chromatic pattern to the finish.

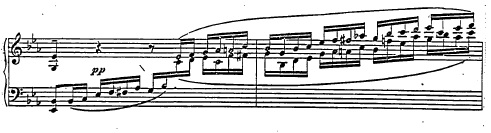
Measures 39–40

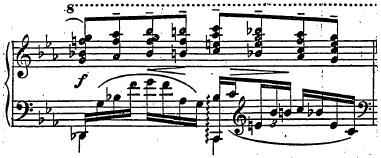
Measure 19

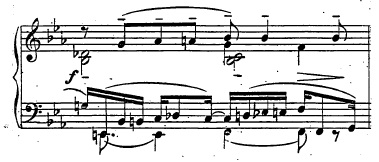
Measure 37

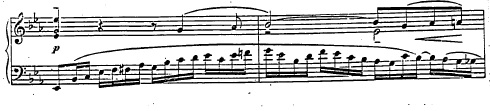
Measures 23–24

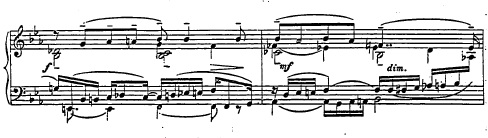
Measures 37–38

== Recordings ==
Alexis Weissenberg as well as Boris Berezovsky have recorded all the preludes written by Rachmaninoff. These works are available on various types of media. Many others recorded outstanding interpretations of the preludes, including Nikolai Lugansky and Van Cliburn.
