= Maui County Council =

The Maui County Council is elected legislative body for the government of Maui County, Hawaii under the Charter of the County of Maui. Legislative powers are vested with the nine-member Maui County Council, while executive powers are rest with the office of the Mayor of Maui County. The council is headquartered in the county seat of Maui County, Wailuku.

== Composition ==
All seats in the county council have residency requirements, but all Maui County voters may vote in elections for all nine at-large seats regardless of residence. Members of the county council are elected on a nonpartisan, at-large basis to two-year terms, with a limit of five consecutive full terms.

Members of the Maui County Council are elected every two years. The Chair of the county council is elected by the body's nine seated members.

Councilmembers
District	Councilmember	Area Represented	Term ends
3	Alice Lee, Council Chair	Wailuku-Waihee-Waikapu Residency Area	2027
7	Yuki Lei Sugimura, Vice-Chair	Upcountry (Pukalani-Kula-Ulupalakua) Residency Area	2027
4	Kauanoe Batangan	Kahului Residency Area	2027
5	Tom Cook	South Maui Residency Area	2027
8	Gabe Johnson	Lanai Residency Area	2027
2	Tamara Paltin	West Maui Residency Area	2027
9	Keani Rawlins-Fernandez	Molokai Residency Area	2027
1	Shane Sinenci	East Maui (Hana-Keanae-Kailua) Residency Area	2027
6	Nohelani Uʻu-Hodgins	Makawao-Haiku-Paia Residency Area	2027
