= Ruth Laredo =

American classical pianist (1937–2005)

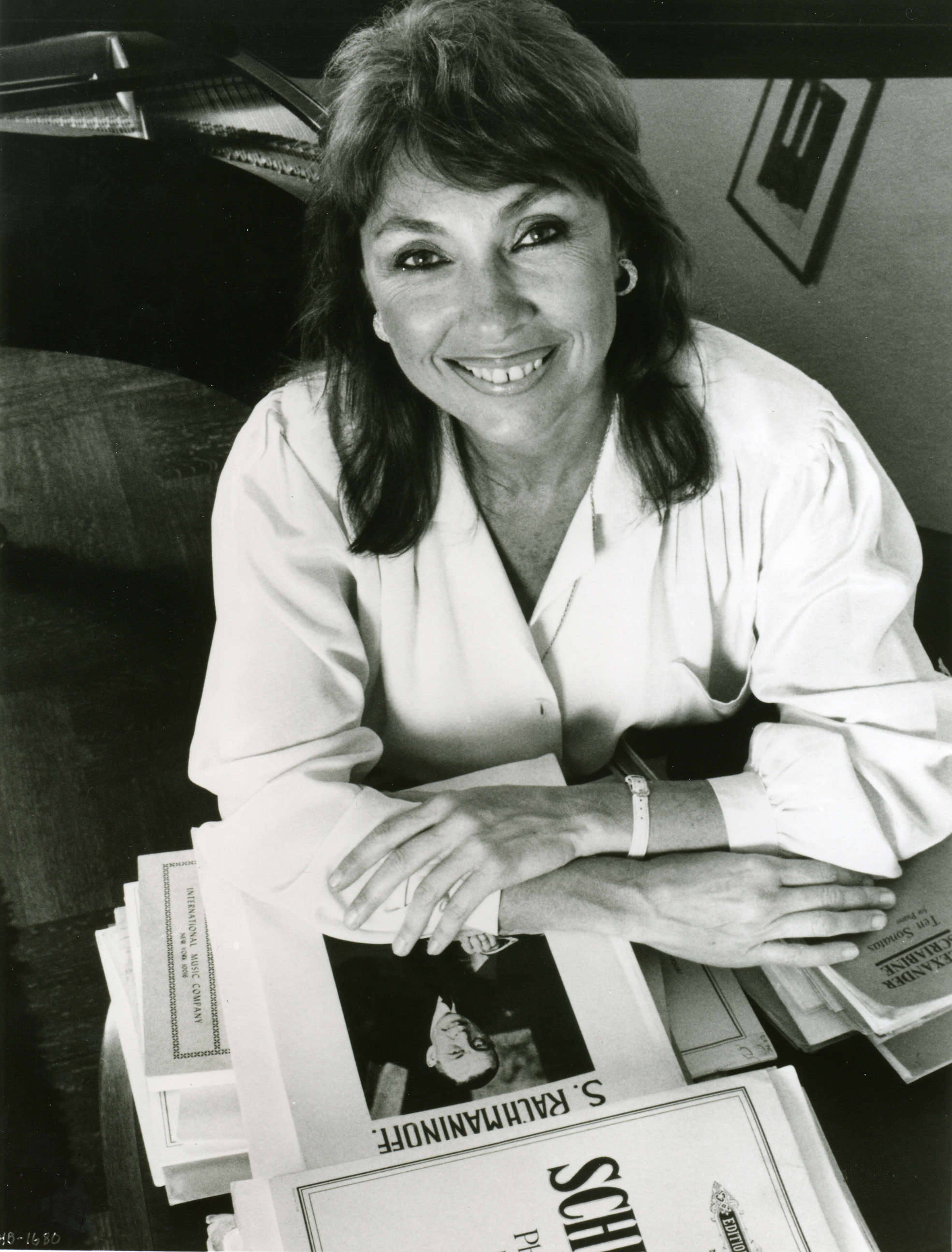
- Ruth Laredo, 1990, in New York City
- Born: Ruth Meckler; November 20, 1937; Detroit, Michigan, United States
- Died: May 25, 2005 (aged 67); New York City, New York, United States
- Resting place: Kensico Cemetery, Valhalla, Westchester County, New York

Ruth Laredo (November 20, 1937 – May 25, 2005) was an American classical pianist.

Laredo became known in the 1970s in particular for her premiere recordings of the 10 sonatas of Scriabin and the complete solo piano works of Rachmaninoff, for her Ravel recordings and, in the last sixteen and a half years before her death, for her series in the Metropolitan Museum of Art “Concerts with Commentary”. She was often referred to as "America's First Lady of the Piano".

== Biography ==
Ruth Meckler was born on November 20, 1937, in Detroit, Michigan, the elder of two daughters of Miriam Meckler-Horowitz, a piano teacher, and Ben Meckler, an English teacher. When Ruth was only two years old and untaught, she was able to play "God Bless America" on her mother's piano.

In 1946, when Ruth was eight years old, her mother took her to a concert of Vladimir Horowitz in the Masonic Auditorium in Detroit. After the concert, Ruth vowed to become a concert pianist. Horowitz played Scriabin, and Laredo was so fascinated by this music that she developed a lifelong passion for Scriabin and other Russian composers, including Scriabin's contemporary Rachmaninoff.

In 1960, Meckler moved to New York City and married the Bolivian-born violinist Jaime Laredo, who was three-and-a half-years younger. She had met him at the Curtis Institute of Music in Philadelphia, and they performed together regularly until their divorce in 1974 (in some publications, erroneously given as 1976). Their union produced a daughter in 1969, Jennifer, who is married to Paul Watkins, chief conductor and music director of the English Chamber Orchestra. Jennifer Laredo Watkins lives in London.

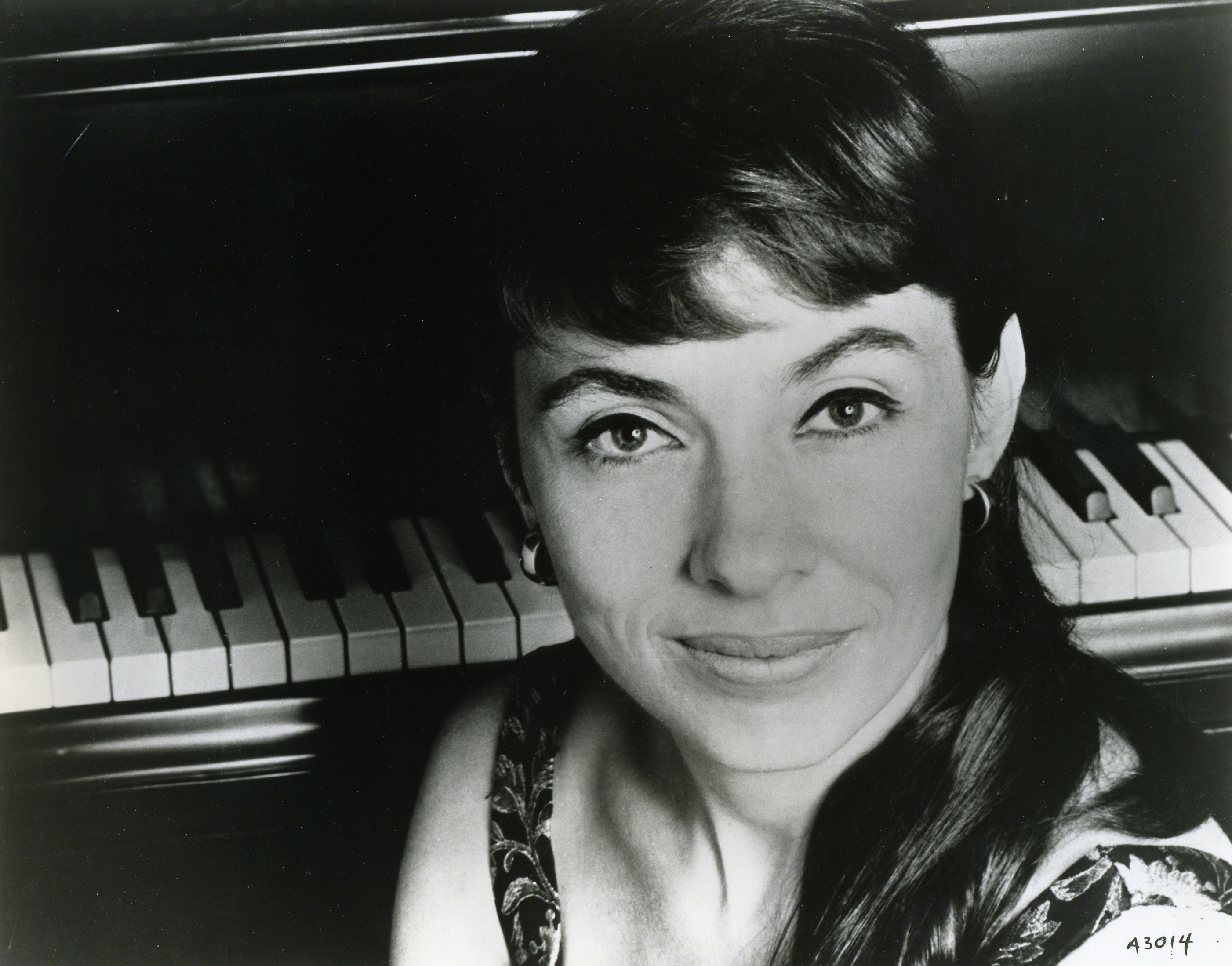
Ruth Laredo, 1970, in New York City.

During the pregnancy and after the birth of her daughter, Ruth Laredo cut back on touring with her husband. Keen to record the music of Scriabin, she approached various record companies with the proposal to record all ten sonatas. Alan Silver from the Connoisseur Society agreed to take the risk, although initially only for one LP (Sonatas No. 5, No. 7, “White Mass”, No. 9, “Black Mass”, Eight Etudes, Op. 42). After the success of this first recording, Connoisseur engaged her to record the remaining seven sonatas, thus making Laredo the first pianist to have recorded the complete cycle: this milestone marked the beginning of her public acclaim as a solo artist.

Laredo explained in The Ruth Laredo Becoming a Musician Book (published in 1992) that it was an alternative way to embark upon a solo career to find a niche repertoire. The more obvious route would have been to win competitions, but apart from the Young Concert Artists International Auditions Laredo never had any success in important competitions.

When her daughter was older, Laredo resumed touring with her husband, but was confronted with his wish to divorce. Finalized in 1974, the divorce pushed Laredo into a personal crisis. She took a teaching job at Yale University and accepted an invitation from Thomas Z. Shepard from CBS Masterworks, who was impressed by the Scriabin recordings, to record the complete solo piano works of Rachmaninoff. This project, said Laredo, saved her life, and with the Rachmaninoff recordings, made from 1974 to 1979 (the latest album released in 1981), her solo career gathered momentum.

In 1982 and 1986, Laredo performed with the Naumburg Orchestral Concerts, in the Naumburg Bandshell, Central Park, in the summer series.

After her landmark recordings, the international music publisher C. F. Peters commissioned Ruth Laredo to edit a new Urtext edition of the complete 24 Preludes of Rachmaninoff, which were published in 1981 (Op. 3, No. 2), 1985 (Op. 23) and 1991 (Op. 32). Laredo thought that many of the markings in the commonly used Rachmaninoff editions were not those of the composer; after studying original manuscripts, which she found in the Library of Congress and in the Rachmaninoff archive in Washington, D.C., and later in the Glinka Museum during her tour to Russia in 1989, her suspicions were confirmed. Her editions were much closer to the composer's original manuscripts.

Laredo wrote articles for the magazines Piano Today and Keyboard Classics, and hosted programs for National Public Radio (NPR), Performance Today and Morning Edition), and the New York classical radio station WQXR (First Hearing and Onstage with Young Concert Artists).

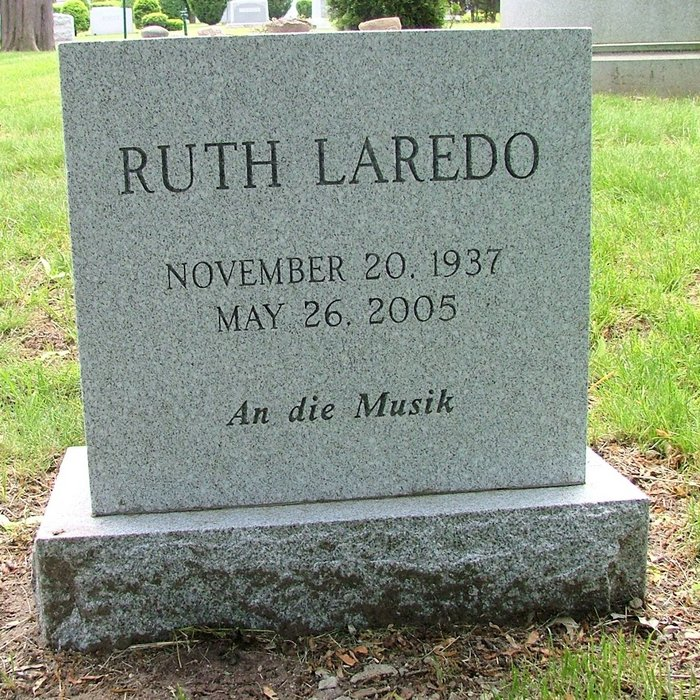
Ruth Laredo's gravestone in Kensico Cemetery, Valhalla, Westchester County, New York, only a few metres away from Rachmaninoff's grave. The inscription "An die Musik" refers to Ruth Laredo's favorite Schubert song.

In 2000, Laredo appeared in a scene of the Woody Allen film Small Time Crooks (2000), in which Hugh Grant's character tries to impress Tracey Ullman's character by taking her to a piano recital, where Ruth Laredo is playing Rachmaninoff.

Laredo was known for wearing striking gowns (most of them made by Lincoln Center's costume designer Catherine Heiser) on stage, which were frequently shown in fashion magazines. She was often seen riding her bicycle or jogging while listening to the music of Phil Collins or the rock group Genesis around Manhattan's Upper West Side, where she lived.

Laredo had a strong commitment to Jewish tradition. In a lecture in the Concerts with Commentary series about Felix Mendelssohn, she discussed the significance and depth of the composer's Jewish background. Abraham Mendelssohn Bartholdy's decision to convert to Protestantism, said Laredo, was a practical means to ensure his son's acceptance into the music profession in Germany.

On May 25, 2005 (20 years ago), Laredo died in her sleep at home of ovarian cancer, a diagnosis made four years earlier, but which did not stop her from giving concerts. She is buried in Kensico Cemetery, Valhalla, New York, a few meters from the grave of Sergei Rachmaninoff, who was so important to her life. At the funeral on May 31, 2005, six days later, two of her closest colleagues performed: Wei Gang Li from the Shanghai Quartet; and Courtenay Budd, with whom – along with the St. Petersburg String Quartet – she had given her last “Concert with Commentary” on May 6, 2005.

On May 18, 2006, her daughter Jennifer organized a memorial concert in the Grace Rainey Rogers Auditorium of the Metropolitan Museum of Art in New York City. The participants were the Guarneri Quartet (with Paul Watkins, Jennifer's husband), Courtenay Budd, Nicolas Kendall, Pei Yao Wang, Edmund Battersby, James Tocco, Susan Wadsworth, director of the Young Concert Artists, and the flutist Paula Robison. Courtenay Budd sang Ruth Laredo's favorite song, Franz Schubert's An die Musik, the title of which Jennifer had chosen for the inscription on her mother's gravestone.

In 2007, the Ruth Laredo Memorial Prize of the Young Concert Artists International Auditions was endowed with contributions from her family and friends and admirers. Laredo had won the Young Concert Artists International Auditions Award in 1962, and later was a frequent and devoted member of the Jury of the Auditions. Winners of the Memorial Prize include Benjamin Moser, Germany, pianist; Bella Hristova, Bulgaria, violinist; Charlie Albright, US, pianist; and George Li, US, pianist.

== Education ==
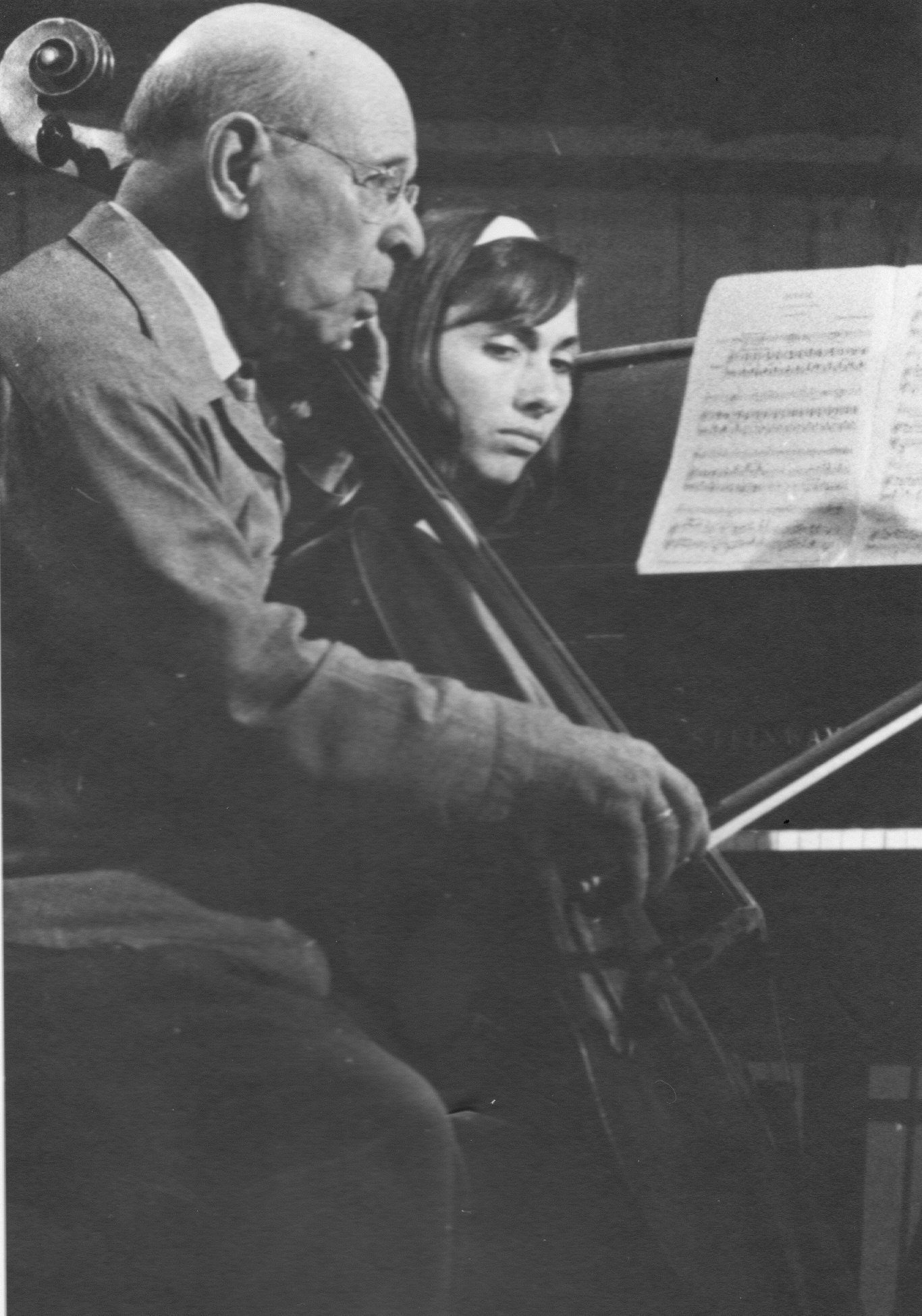
Ruth Laredo, 1963, in Marlboro, Vermont, studying with Pablo Casals.

Ruth Laredo's mother Miriam Meckler, a piano teacher mainly for children, taught Ruth first. When the time came for more formal training in 1947, she sent her to Edward Bredshall. Bredshall had studied with Nadia Boulanger in Paris and was known for his effective methods of teaching. She studied with him four years, and he introduced her to the music of other Russian composers, notably Prokofiev, Stravinsky and Kabalevsky.

Laredo's preference for Russian music led her to team up with a Russian émigré, Mischa Kottler, who also was the teacher of the pianist and singer Muriel Elizabeth Charbonneau and later of the saxophonist and composer Rick Margitza and the jazz pianist Ray Cooke.

From 1951 to 1955, Laredo attended Mumford High School in Detroit. During summer vacations she enjoyed the Indian Hill Summer Workshops in Stockbridge, Massachusetts. After her graduation in 1955 she began her studies with Rudolf Serkin at the Curtis Institute of Music in Philadelphia. She had been introduced to Serkin in 1954 by the violinist Berl Senofsky and the pianist Seymour Lipkin, both of whom she knew from the summer camps. Serkin told her at her audition in Marlboro, Vermont: “I can see that you play like a tiger!” He accepted her as one of only four students.

Rudolf Serkin, a student of Arnold Schoenberg and himself an artist of worldwide reputation, was known for his complete dedication to the music, and his fidelity to the composer. At first, he took a dim view of Laredo's passion for the music of Russian composers; his tastes ran to the Mozart-Beethoven-Schubert-Brahms line of Central European composers. Despite this, Ruth Laredo would become known later for her Scriabin and Rachmaninoff recordings and performances.

Ruth Laredo spent many summers at the Marlboro Music School and Festival near Brattleboro, Vermont, which had been founded in 1950 by Rudolf Serkin and Adolf Busch (then called School of Music). There she continued her studies with Serkin and was coached in chamber music by the cellist Pablo Casals. Fellow students included Murray Perahia, Richard Goode (currently artistic director of the festival, together with Mitsuko Uchida), Emanuel Ax and Yo-Yo Ma. At the end of each festival season, the traditional closing work was Beethoven's Choral Fantasy, Op. 80, with Rudolf Serkin as soloist and the entire Marlboro community in the chorus.

Ruth Laredo graduated in 1960 with a diploma from the Curtis Institute of Music and a Bachelor of Music degree from the University of Pennsylvania. Her graduation took place on a celebration of the fiftieth birthday of the American composer Samuel Barber. By coincidence she had prepared his Sonata in E-flat minor, Op. 26 for her graduation recital, and so became part of the celebration. Barber was in the audience and came back to her after the concert, very warmly congratulated her, and wrote on her copy of the Sonata: “Brava, bravissima.”

== Teaching ==
At the Curtis Institute of Music and at the summer music festival of the Meadowmount School of Music in Elizabethtown, New York, Ruth Laredo was chosen by the violin pedagogue Ivan Galamian and the cellist Leonard Rose to be the piano accompanist for their students, among them Arnold Steinhardt, Michael Tree, Pinchas Zukerman, and Itzhak Perlman.

Ruth Laredo was a member of the faculties of Kent State University (1968–71), Yale University, New Haven, Connecticut, the Curtis Institute of Music, Philadelphia, and the Manhattan School of Music, New York City. She gave master classes in those institutions and at the Eastman School of Music (University of Rochester), Indiana University Bloomington, the New England Conservatory of Music, Boston, the Music Academy of the West in Montecito, California, and Princeton University. For some time she held the Wiley Housewright Eminent Scholar Chair at the Florida State University, Tallahassee. Among her students were the American composer and pianist Curt Cacioppo; Michael Kimmelman, chief art critic of the New York Times; the Czech pianist Adam Skoumal; and the Swiss pianist Oliver Schnyder.

Laredo served as a jury member for several competitions, among them the Young Concert Artists International Auditions, the Naumburg Foundation Competition, the Seventeen Magazine Competition, the New York City Competition, all New York City, and the William Kapell International Piano Competition, Maryland. As late as 2004 she was a jury member of the International Piano-e-Competition in Minneapolis-St. Paul, Minnesota. “We had no idea she was ill,” competition director and pianist Alexander Braginsky told the Minneapolis Star Tribune after Laredo's death: "She was so feisty and opinionated, a powerful personality."

== Concerts ==
Ruth Laredo appeared on stage as a little girl in the Music Club of Metropolitan Detroit. When she was 11, she gave both her first recital in the Detroit Institute of Arts (among the pieces the first movement of Beethoven's Piano Concerto No. 2, where her teacher Edward Bredshall played the orchestral part), and, under Karl Krueger, her first concert with the Detroit Symphony Orchestra, with whom she played the second and third movements of the concerto.

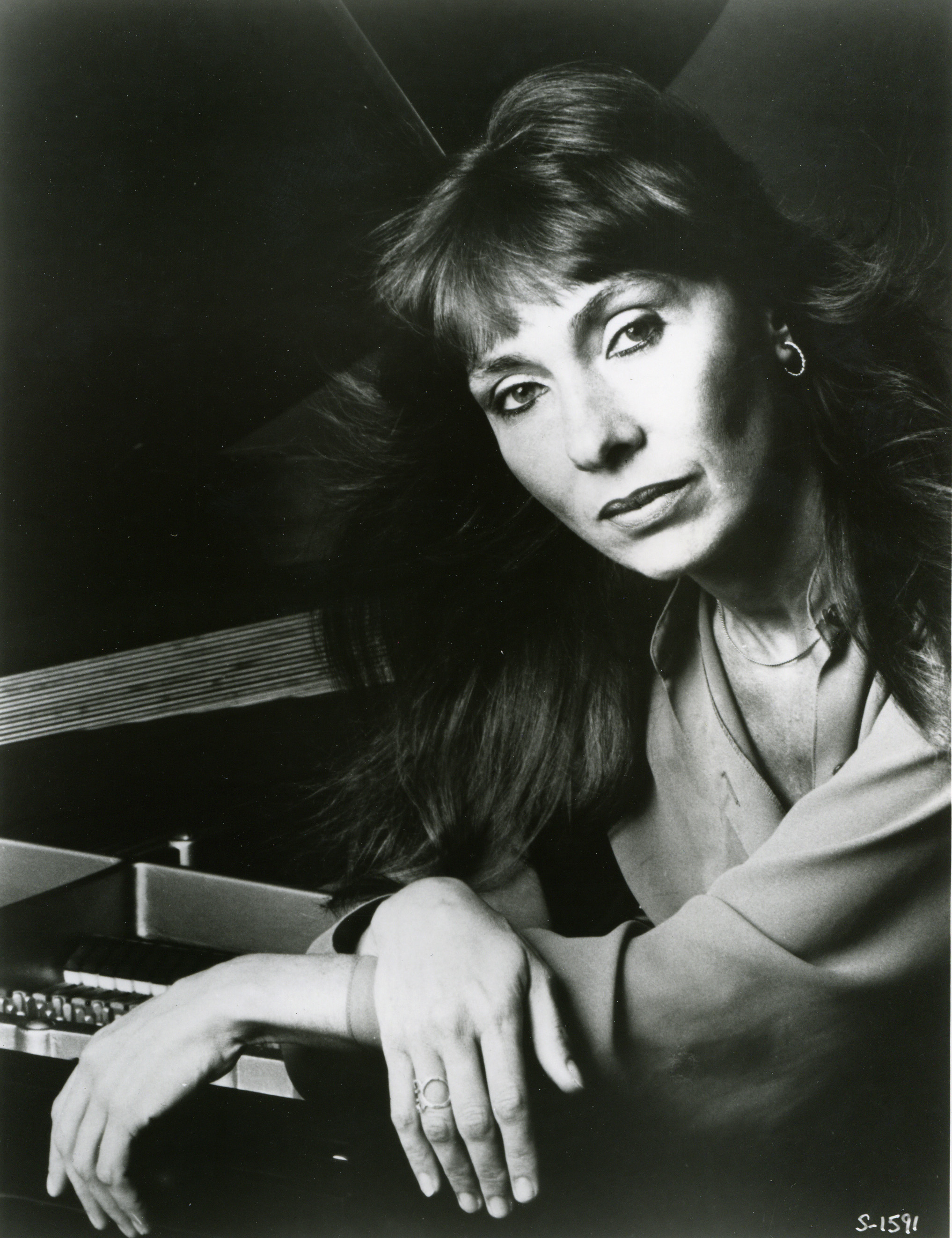
Ruth Laredo, 1995 at a "Concert with Commentary", a series in the Metropolitan Museum of Art in New York City. The series was an own creation of Ruth Laredo and ran from 1988 with at least three concerts per year until shortly before she died in 2005.

Laredo spent much of the first decade of her career as accompanist to her husband Jaime Laredo. At the same time she tried to establish herself as a soloist and in 1962 she made her orchestral debut in Carnegie Hall with the American Symphony Orchestra conducted by Leopold Stokowski. Unfortunately the debut attracted little attention, and it was some time before she became recognized as a solo performer.

Laredo was a founding member of the Music from Marlboro Concerts and in 1965 participated in their first tour, which included a visit to Israel where she played Johann Sebastian Bach's Concerto for three pianos in D minor with Rudolf and Peter Serkin. She appeared in the very first Music from Marlboro Concert, “Isaac Stern and Friends”, in Carnegie Hall in New York City.

In 1974, Laredo's solo career had a major boost, when she gave her debut in Avery Fisher Hall at New York's Lincoln Center. Her performance of Maurice Ravel's Piano Concerto in G major with the New York Philharmonic, conducted by Pierre Boulez, was met with enthusiastic critical acclaim. In 1976 Young Concert Artists presented her solo recital debut in Alice Tully Hall at Lincoln Center with pieces of Beethoven, Scriabin, Rachmaninoff and Ravel, whose “La Valse” would become her signature piece. Her encore in this concert was Gershwin's Second Piano Prelude. In 1981 she made her solo recital debut in Carnegie Hall with a program entitled “Homage to Rachmaninoff”, which included works by Chopin, Beethoven and Scriabin.

In 1988, Laredo participated at the celebration of the 135th anniversary of the first Steinway piano, and the 500,000th piano manufactured by that company. The concert, hosted by Van Cliburn, featured 27 famed pianists, including Alfred Brendel, Shura Cherkassky, Murray Perahia, Rudolf Serkin and Alexis Weissenberg. Laredo played Rachmaninoff's Prelude Op. 32, No. 5 and Coquette from Robert Schumann's Carnaval, Op. 9.

Besides New York City and Detroit, Laredo performed in Washington, D.C. (Kennedy Center, Library of Congress, 1966 in the White House together with her then-husband Jaime Laredo for President Lyndon B. Johnson), in Boston, Buffalo, Chicago, Cleveland, Houston, Indianapolis, Maryland, Nashville, Philadelphia, San Francisco, Santa Barbara and Toronto, at numerous festivals, among them the Amadeus Festival/Midsummer Nights Festival in New Jersey, the Aspen Music Festival and School in Aspen, Colorado, the Bridgehampton Chamber Music Festival in Bridgehampton, New York, the Caramoor International Music Festival in Katonah, New York, the Eastern Music Festival in Greensboro, North Carolina, the Maverick Concerts Festival in Hurley, New York, the Spoleto Festival USA in Charleston, South Carolina, the Great Lakes Chamber Music Festival in Detroit, the Music Mountain Summer Chamber Music Festival in Falls Village, Connecticut, and the Casals Festival in San Juan, Puerto Rico. She made tours in the season 1976/1977 to Europe (Netherlands, Germany) and Japan, and 1979 to Japan and Hong Kong. Particularly remarkable was her tour in 1989 to Russia (then RSFSR, Moscow, St. Petersburg [then Leningrad]) and Ukraine (then USSR, Odessa). For an American to come to Russia to play the music of Russian composers – in the same room of the Moscow Conservatory where Rachmaninoff had played – was an extraordinary undertaking. Laredo enjoyed a very warm welcome by the audience and her concerts were sold out. In the Glinka Museum in Moscow she had the opportunity to see Rachmaninoff's original manuscripts.

In addition to the New York Philharmonic, the Detroit Symphony Orchestra, and the American Symphony Orchestra, Ruth Laredo also played, among others, with the Philadelphia, the Cleveland and the American Composers Orchestra, the Baltimore, Beaumont, Boston, Greenwich, Houston, Indianapolis, Jupiter, Madison, National, New Jersey, St. Louis and Terre Haute Symphony Orchestra, the Buffalo and the Warsaw Philharmonic Orchestra under Kazimierz Kord, with whom in 1993 she performed in Warsaw in a United Nations Day Concert, which was broadcast by TV stations all around Europe, and then toured with the orchestra through the US culminating in a concert in Carnegie Hall with Rachmaninoff's Piano Concerto No. 1.

In the 1988/1989 season, Laredo began her series “Concerts with Commentary” (first called “Speaking of Music”) in the Grace Rainey Rogers Auditorium of the New York Metropolitan Museum of Art. The series ran for 17 seasons until the last concert on May 6, 2005, shortly before her death. The programs became very popular and therefore she performed them in other cities of the US.

The series included works from Brahms, Chopin, Dvořák, Fauré, Franck, Rachmaninoff, Ravel, Clara and Robert Schumann, Scriabin and Tchaikovsky, which she discussed before the performances with great engagement. The final concert was the third of a series entitled “The Russian Spirit” with music from Tchaikovsky, Rachmaninoff, Scriabin and Shostakovich.

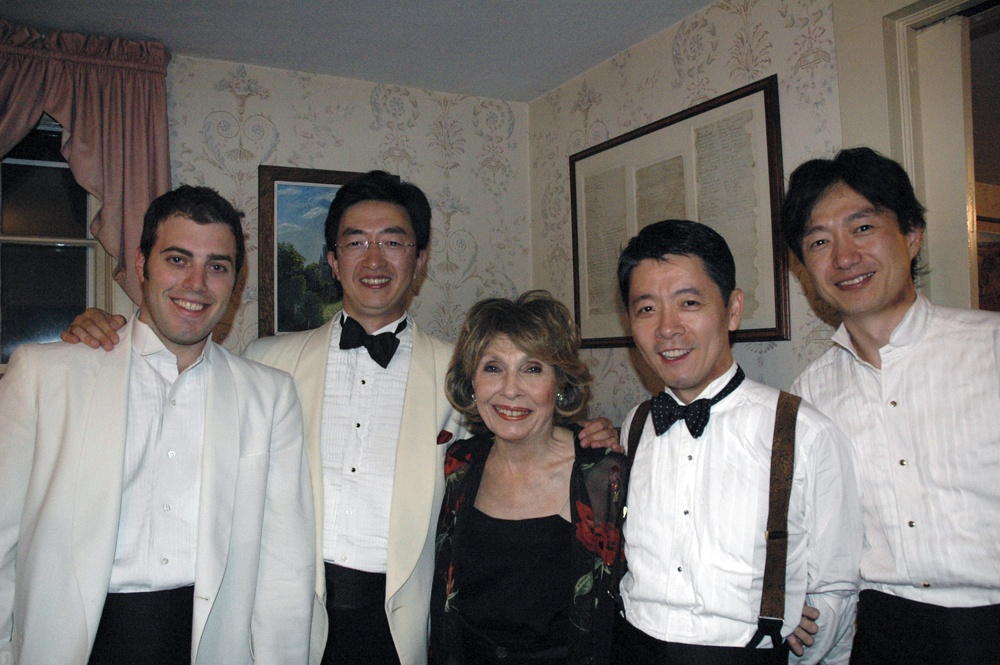
Ruth Laredo, 2004, in Nantucket, Massachusetts, with the Shanghai Quartet, who called her its fifth member.

On September 13, 2001, only two days after the terrorist attacks on the World Trade Center in New York City, Ruth Laredo celebrated the 25th anniversary of her debut in the Alice Tully Hall with a recital as the opening concert of Lincoln Center's 2001 season. Before the concert, she explained to the audience why she had not cancelled the event: “It was important for me to play. Great music gives us spiritual sustenance and gives us hope. It is in that spirit that I play tonight.” The program was similar to that of her debut in 1976 and included works by Robert Schumann, Beethoven, Scriabin, Rachmaninoff and Ravel, with Chopin's Waltz Op. 69, No. 1 as the encore.

In September 2004, Laredo was invited by the Russian ministry of culture to participate in the International Festival of the Rimsky-Korsakov St. Petersburg State Conservatory. At this event, dedicated to the 200th birthday of the Russian composer Mikhail Glinka, she played chamber music as well as solo recitals and gave a master class for Russian students.

Laredo was noted for her strong commitment to chamber music and said that soloists particularly need this experience as a preparation for concerts with big orchestras. She herself noted: "The lack of it is evident when a soloist performs as if the orchestra were a mere accompaniment." She collaborated frequently with the Shanghai Quartet (regularly at the Music Mountain Festival), and among others with the American, Budapest, Emerson, Manhattan, Muir, St. Lawrence, St. Petersburg, Veronika and the Vermeer Quartet, with the Chappaqua, Manhattan Chamber, Orpheus Chamber and Saint Paul Chamber Orchestra, with the Philharmonia Virtuosi, the Sea Cliff Chamber Players and the Orchestra of St. Luke's. She appeared with the Guarneri Quartet and the Tokyo String Quartet in the Lincoln Center series Great Performers. She helped the Tokyo String Quartet several times when a member of the Quartet was indisposed transforming the group temporarily into a piano quartet. Since their first association in 1980 in Alice Tully Hall, she toured each season with the flutist Paula Robison as the “Paula and Ruth” duo.

Laredo also played contemporary music, mainly in the beginning of her career in Marlboro. This was something Pablo Casals – who did not like music beyond the era of Brahms – disapproved of. He would stay home when Leon Kirchner would come to Marlboro for a performance. In the 1983/1984 season she played the world premiere of Peter Martins's work called Waltzes with the New York City Ballet. In 1989 she played Wallingford Riegger's twelve-tone Variations for Piano and Orchestra at Carnegie Hall with the American Composers Orchestra under Paul Lustig Dunkel. Her repertoire included also works by Franz Liszt, Arnold Schoenberg, Béla Bartók, Anton Webern and Alban Berg.

In 1994, Laredo played with jazz pianist Marian McPartland and from 1996 with her and Dick Hyman in programs entitled Three Piano Crossover.

In the final years of her life, Laredo's career as a soloist with orchestras waned, but she was comfortable with a mix of recitals and chamber concerts.

Laredo criticized the rising trend in the US of recording live concerts for broadcast as "troublesome". She preferred the European method of recording the music in radio studios for subsequent broadcast.

== Recordings ==
In 1967, Ruth Laredo recorded a well-received album of piano music by French composer Maurice Ravel, also renowned for music full of pianistic challenges.

In 1970, Laredo made her famous premiere recordings of Scriabin's 10 sonatas on three LPs for Connoisseur Society (reissued in 1984 by Nonesuch Records on a three-LP box and in 1996 on a double CD). She made the recordings in St. Paul's Chapel at Columbia University, New York City, on a Baldwin SD-10 grand piano. The Scriabin LPs were released in a period where little of Scriabin's music was available, and Laredo's recordings led to his rising popularity in the US. "I was kind of a crusader for his music," said Laredo.

From 1974 to 1981, Laredo followed up with Rachmaninoff's complete solo piano works on seven LPs for CBS Masterworks (reissued in 1993 by Sony Classical on five CDs), a project no pianist before had ever dared to undertake (at the same time the German-American pianist Michael Ponti also recorded the Scriabin and Rachmaninoff works). At this time she was a relative rarity as a female piano soloist, particularly in the technically demanding and muscular works of Rachmaninoff. There were only a few others – Gina Bachauer, Myra Hess and later Alicia de Larrocha, for example. The New York Daily News baptised her now “America's First Lady of the Piano”, an appellation which was later used by many others. Laredo initially disliked this as she felt it was sexist: she wanted to be known as a pianist, not a “woman pianist” Later she relented and used the title herself in her book and on her website.

The preparations for the recording of Rachmaninoff's solo piano works proved to be very exhausting. Laredo said she now understood why some of the pieces had never been played by anybody: it was simply because they were so hard. Rachmaninoff, who was 6 ft 4 in (1.93 m) tall with correspondingly large hands, had composed many of his works for himself. One could only wonder how the tiny 5 ft 1 in (1.55 m) Laredo was able to play Rachmaninoff's pieces, some of which indulged in 11-key stretches. After practicing the music of “Rocky”, as she called Rachmaninoff, she had to get her hands massaged.

Laredo also recorded more than 20 albums featuring works of other composers, among them Isaac Albéniz, Bach, Beethoven, Lili Boulanger, Brahms, Chopin, Falla, Debussy, Khachaturian, Fauré, Mozart, Poulenc, Ravel, Clara and Robert Schumann, Tchaikovsky as well as of the American composers Barber, Aaron Copland, Ives, Laderman, Kirchner, Rorem and Siegmeister. Especially acclaimed was the recording with James Tocco of Stravinsky's The Rite of Spring in the version for two pianos for Gasparo Records.

In 1999, Laredo made her final recordings with the Shanghai Quartet, who called her "the fifth member of the Shanghai Quartet" for Arabesque Records (piano quartets by Brahms) and at the Great Lakes Chamber Music Festival with the violinist Philip Setzer for Newport Classic (“Day Music” by Ned Rorem; the CD contains also Norem's “War Scenes” and “End of Summer” performed by other artists, including the composer at the piano). Both CDs were released in 2000.

On February 19, 2004, Laredo performed with jazz pianist Marian McPartland for NPR, on what was probably her last known radio program appearance.

== Awards and recognitions ==
- Winner of the Gabrilowitsch scholarship (1948/49)
- Winner of the Young Concert Artists International Auditions (1962)
- Year's Best Recording Award of Stereo Review and Saturday Review (Ravel: Gaspard de la Nuit, Valses Nobles et Sentimentales, La Valse; 1968)
- Year's Best Recording Award of Saturday Review and High Fidelity (Scriabin: The Complete Sonatas, Vol. 1; 1970)
- Best of the Month of Stereo Review (Scriabin: The Complete Sonatas, Vol. 1; 1970)
- Musician of the Month of High Fidelity/Musical America (1974)
- Nomination for the Grammy Award 1976 (Ravel: Trio for Violin, Cello and Piano, with Jaime Laredo and Jeffrey Solow)
- Best of the Month of Stereo Review (Rachmaninoff, The Complete Works for Solo Piano, Vol. 5; 1979)
- Best Keyboard Artist Award of the Record World Magazine (Rachmaninoff, The Complete Works for Solo Piano, Vol. 5; 1979)
- Nomination for the Grammy Award 1981 (Rachmaninoff: The Complete Works for Solo Piano, Vol. 7)
- selected as one of five pianists for the 90-year anniversary celebration of the Carnegie Hall (1981)
- Nomination for the Grammy Award 1983 (Barber: Sonata for Piano, Op. 26, Souvenirs, Op. 28, Nocturne, Op. 33)
- Honorary Member of the Sigma Alpha Iota International Music Fraternity (1983)
- Distinguished Service to Music in America Award of the Music Teachers National Association (1989)
- Music in Humanity Award at the Music Festival in Mount Gretna, Pennsylvania (1994)
- Best of the Year of the Audiophile Audition Magazine (2nd new edition of the Scriabin Sonatas; 1997)

== Discography ==
- Mozart/Bach. Music from Marlboro; Mozart: Concerto in E-flat for two Pianos (Rudolf Serkin, Peter Serkin); Bach: Concerto in C major for three Pianos (Mieczyslaw Horszowski, Peter Serkin, Rudolf Serkin), Concerto in D minor for three Pianos (Rudolf Serkin, Mieczyslaw Horszowski, Ruth Laredo); Marlboro Festival Orchestra (Alexander Schneider). LP, CBS Masterworks ML 6247, 1964
- Bach. Brandenburg Concerto No. 1, BWV 1046: Members of the Marlboro Festival and Myron Bloom, Robert Johnson (horns), John Mack, Ronald Richards, Peter Christ (oboes), Donald MacCourt (bassoon), Alexander Schneider (violin); Brandenburg Concerto No. 2, BWV 1047: Members of the Marlboro Festival and Robert Nagel (trumpet), Ørnulf Gulbransen (flute), John Mack (oboe); Alexander Schneider (violin); Brandenburg Concerto No. 3, BWV 1048; Orchestral Suite No. 1, BWV 1066: Members of the Marlboro Festival and John Mack, Joseph Turner (oboes), Joyce Kelley (bassoon), Ruth Laredo (piano); Marlboro Festival Orchestra: Pablo Casals. CD, Sony Classical SMK 46253, 1990; recorded 1964 (Brandenburg Concertos 1 and 3), 1965 (Brandenburg Concerto 2) and 1966 (Orchestral Suite)
- Bach. Brandenburg Concerto No. 4, BWV 1049: Members of the Marlboro Festival and Alexander Schneider (violin), Ørnulf Gulbransen, Nancy Dalley (flutes), Rudolf Serkin (piano); Brandenburg Concerto No. 5, BWV 1050: Members of the Marlboro Festival and Ørnulf Gulbransen (flute), Alexander Schneider (violin), Rudolf Serkin (piano); Brandenburg Concerto No. 6, BWV 1051: Members of the Marlboro Festival and Peter Serkin (continuo); Orchestral Suite No. 4, BWV 1069: Members of the Marlboro Festival and Henry Nowak, Wilmer Wise, Louis Opalesky (trumpets), John Mack, Joseph Turner, Patricia Grignet (oboes), Joyce Kelley (bassoon), John Wyre (timpani), Ruth Laredo (piano); Marlboro Festival Orchestra: Pablo Casals. CD, Sony Classical SMK 46254, 1990; recorded 1964 (Brandenburg Concertos) and 1966 (Orchestral Suite)
- Bach. Goldberg Variations, BWV 1087: Members of the Marlboro Festival and Rudolf Serkin (piano); Orchestral Suite No. 2, BWV 1067: Members of the Marlboro Festival and Ornulf Gulbransen (flute), Ruth Laredo (continuo); Orchestral Suite No. 3, BWV 1068: Members of the Marlboro Festival and Henry Nowak, Wilmer Wise, Louis Opalesky (trumpets), John Mack, Patricia Grignet (oboes), John Wyre (timpani), Ruth Laredo (continuo); Marlboro Festival Orchestra: Pablo Casals. CD, Sony Classical SMK 45892, 1990; recorded 1976 (Goldberg Variations) and 1966 (Orchestral Suites)
- Ravel. Gaspard de la Nuit, Valses Nobles et Sentimentales, La Valse. LP, Connoisseur Society CS-2005, 1968
- Scriabin. The Complete Piano Sonatas, Sonata No. 1, Op. 6; Etude, Op. 2, No. 1; Sonata No. 2, Op. 19; Eight Etudes, Op. 42; Sonata No. 3, Op. 23; Sonata No. 4, Op. 30; Sonata No. 5, Op. 53; Sonata No. 6, Op. 62; Désir, Op. 57, No. 1; Caresse dansée, Op. 57, No. 2; Sonata No. 7, Op. 64; Sonata No. 8, Op. 66; Sonata No. 9, Op. 68; Sonata No. 10, Op. 70; Vers la Flamme, Op. 72. 2 CDs, Nonesuch 5973035-2, 1996 (new edition of 3 LPs Connoisseur Society CS-2032/CS-2034/CS-2035, 1970/Nonesuch 73035, 1984)
- Robert Schumann. Music for piano and violin; Ruth Laredo (piano), Jaime Laredo (violin); Sonata No. 1, Op. 105; Sonata No. 2, Op. 121; Intermezzo from F.A.E. Sonata. LP, Desto DC 6442, 1979; recorded 1970
- Laderman/Siegmeister. Ezra Laderman: Duo for Violin and Piano; Elie Siegmeister: Sonata No. 2; Jaime Laredo (violin), Ruth Laredo (piano). Desto Records LP DC 7125, 1971
- Scriabin. 24 Preludes, Op. 11 (incl. No. 9 and No. 10); 5 Preludes, Op. 74 (incl. No. 2); Poem, Op. 32, No. 1. CD, Phoenix USA PHCD 114, 1990 (new edition of LP Desto DC 7145, 1972)

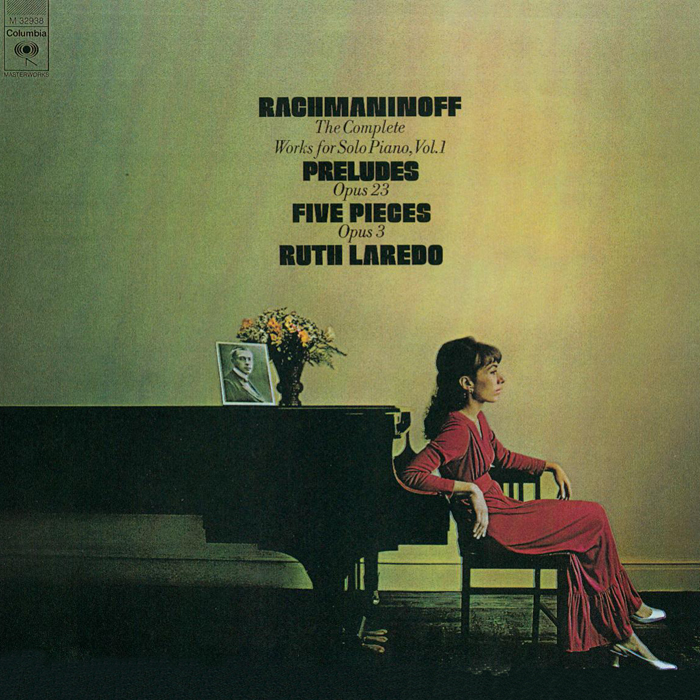
The first of seven LPs of the Complete Works for Piano of Rachmaninoff, 1974

- Rorem/Kirchner. Ned Rorem: Day Music, Leon Kirchner: Sonata concertante; Jaime Loredo (violin), Ruth Laredo (piano). LP, Desto DC 7151, 1973
- Rorem. Day Music: Jaime Laredo (violin), Ruth Laredo (piano); Night Music: Earl Carlyss (violin), Ann Schein (piano). CD, Phoenix USA PHCD123, 1991 (Day Music previously published on LP Desto DC 7151, 1973; Night Music on LP Desto DC 7174, 1974)
- Scriabin. Greatest Hits; Morton Estrin/Ruth Laredo; Ruth Laredo plays Etude, Op. 2, No. 1; Sonata No. 4, Op. 30; Etudes, Op. 42, No. 3 and No. 4; Vers la Flamme, Op. 72; Sonata No. 5, Op. 53. LP, Connoisseur Society CS-2046, 1973
- Ravel. Music from Marlboro, The Marlboro Music Festival, Rudolf Serkin (director); Trio for Violin, Cello and Piano: Jaime Laredo (violin), Ruth Laredo (piano), Jeffrey Solow (cello); Sonata for Violin and Cello: Jaime Laredo (violin), Leslie Parnas (cello). LP, CBS Masterworks M 33529, 1973
- Kirchner/Copland/Ives/Lees. Music for Violin and Piano; Leon Kirchner: Sonata Concertante (Jaime Laredo, violin; Ruth Laredo, piano); Aaron Copland: Sonata for Violin and Piano (Jaime Laredo, violin; Ann Schein, piano); Charles Ives: Sonata No. 4 for Violin and Piano (Jaime Laredo, violin; Ann Schein, piano); Benjamin Lees: Sonata No. 2 (1973; Rafael Druian, violin; Ilse von Alpenheim, piano). CD, Phoenix USA PHCD 136, 1997 (Kirchner previously published on LP Desto DC 7151, 1973, Copland and Ives onLP Desto DC 6439, 1975, Lees on LP Desto DC 7174, 1974)
- Rachmaninoff. The Complete Solo Piano Music, Vol. 1; Fantasy Pieces, Op. 3 (incl. Prelude in C sharp minor); Salon Pieces, Op. 10; Moments Musicaux, Op. 16. CD, Sony Classical SMK 48468, 1993 (new edition on 5 CDs of The Complete Works for Solo Piano on 7 LPs from CBS Masterworks M 32938/M 33430/M 33998/M 34532/M 35151/M 35836/M 35881, 1974–1981)
- Rachmaninoff. The Complete Solo Piano Music, Vol. 2; Piano Transcriptions; Chopin Variations. CD, Sony Classical SMK 48469, 1993 (new edition on 5 CDs of The Complete Works for Solo Piano on 7 LPs from CBS MasterworksM 32938/M 33430/M 33998/M 34532/M 35151/M 35836/M 35881, 1974–1981)
- Rachmaninoff. The Complete Solo Piano Music, Vol. 3; Sonatas No. 1, Op. 28 and No. 2, Op. 36; Corelli Variations. CD, Sony Classical SMK 48470, 1993 (new edition on 5 CDs of The Complete Works for Solo Piano on 7 LPs from CBS Masterworks M 32938/M 33430/M 33998/M 34532/M 35151/M 35836/M 35881, 1974–1981)
- Rachmaninoff. The Complete Solo Piano Music, Vol. 4; Preludes Op. 23 and Op. 32. CD, Sony Classical SMK 48471, 1993 (new edition on 5 CDs of The Complete Works for Solo Piano on 7 LPs from CBS Masterworks M 32938/M 33430/M 33998/M 34532/M 35151/M 35836/M 35881, 1974–1981)
- Rachmaninoff. The Complete Solo Piano Music, Vol. 5; Etudes-Tableaux, Op. 33 and Op. 39; Fragments; Lilacs; Daisies; Oriental Sketch; Two Fantasy Pieces. CD, Sony Classical SMK 48472, 1993 (new edition on 5 CDs of The Complete Works for Solo Piano on 7 LPs from CBS Masterworks M 32938/M 33430/M 33998/M 34532/M 35151/M 35836/M 35881, 1974–1981)
- Rachmaninoff. Romantic Piano Pieces: Morceaux de fantaisie, Op. 3; Morceaux de salon, Op. 10; Moments musicaux, Op. 16;3,5; Preludes, Op. 23;1,3,4,5,6,10; Preludes, Op. 32;2,5,10,12,13, Etudes-Tableaux, Op. 33;7 and Op. 39;2. CD, Sony Classical, SMK 89950, 2002 (collection of previously published material, 1974–1977)
- Rachmaninoff/Debussy/Scriabin/Prokofiev. Recital; Rachmaninoff: Prelude in C-sharp minor, Op. 3, No. 2; Debussy: Feu d’artifice, Bruyères, La fille aux cheveux de lin, Reflets dans l'eau; Scriabin: Etude in C-sharp minor, Op. 2, No. 1; Poem, Op. 32, No. 1; Sonata No. 9 in F, Op. 68 (“Black Mass”); Prokofiev: Sonata No. 3 in A minor, Op. 28. CD, Connoisseur Society 30CD-3020, 1980
- Debussy/Scriabin/Rachmaninoff. Essential Piano Library, The Student's Essential Classics, with Earl Wild, Santiago Rodriguez, David Bar-Illan, Jorge Bolet, Gilbert Kalish; Ruth Laredo plays Debussy, The Girl with the Flaxen Hair (Preludes, Book I), Reflections in the Water (Images, Book I), Fireworks (Preludes, Book II); Scriabin, Etude in C-sharp minor Op. 2, No. 1; Rachmaninoff, Prelude in C-sharp minor, Op. 3, No. 2. 2 LPs Baldwin Piano Artists BDW-700/701, 1981
- Scriabin/Prokofiev/Barber. Essential Piano Library, Masters Perform Master Works. LP, Baldwin Piano Artists BDW-805, 1981
- Ravel. Miroirs, La Valse, Sonatine, Prelude in A major, Menuet sur le nom d'Haydn. CD, Sanctuary, 1998 (new edition of LP CBS Masterworks M 36734, 1982)
- Barber. Piano Sonata, Op. 26; Souvenirs, Op. 28; Nocturne, Op. 33 (Homage to John Field). CD, Sanctuary, 1998 (new edition of LP Nonesuch D 79032, 1982)
- Chopin. Mazurkas, Op. 6, Nos. 2 and 3; Op. 24, No. 2; Op. 33, No. 4; Op. 56, No. 2; Op. 63, No. 3; Waltzes, Op. 34, Nos. 1 and 2; Op. 42; Op. 69, No. 1; Op. 69, No. 2; Etude, Op. 25, No. 4; Nocturne, Op. 15, No. 1; Scherzo, Op. 20. CD, Sanctuary, 1998 (new edition of LP Nonesuch 71450, 1987; recorded 1982/1985)
- Tchaikovsky. The Seasons, Op. 37a; Polka de Salon, Op. 9, No. 2; Mazurka de Salon, Op. 9, No. 3; Humoresque, Op. 10, No. 2; Natha-Valse, Op. 51, No. 4. CD, Sanctuary, 1998 (new edition of LP Nonesuch Digital Stereo 79119, 1985)
- Fauré/Lili Boulanger/Ravel/Poulenc. French Masterpieces for flute and piano, Ruth Laredo (piano), Paula Robison (flute); Gabriel Fauré: Sonata in A major; Lili Boulanger: Nocturne; Maurice Ravel: Pièce en forme de Habanera; Francis Poulenc: Sonata. CD, Pergola, 2006 (new edition of CD Musical Heritage Society 2003 resp. LP Amerco 1991/1992; recorded in 1985)
- Beethoven. Sonatas No. 23 (Appassionata), No. 26 (Les Adieux), No. 3 and No. 20. CD, Second Hearing GS 9007, 1986; recorded live
- Ravel. Pièces pour 2 pianos, Ruth Laredo, Jacques Rouvier; Bolero, Mother Goose Suite, Sites Auriculaires, Frontispièce, La Valse. CD, Denon 33C37-7907, 1986
- Albéniz/Falla. Isaac Albéniz: Songs of Spain, Suite Española; Manuel de Falla: Three Dances from The Three-Cornered Hat, Suite from El Amor Brujo. CD, MCA Classics MCAD-6265, 1988
- Bach/Mozart/Beethoven/Chopin/Debussy/Robert Schumann/Prokofiev. My First Recital; Bach: Prelude No. 1 in C, BWV 846; Two-Part Invention No. 1 in C, BWV 772; Two-Part Invention No. 4 in d, BWV 775; Two-Part Invention No. 8 in F, BWV 779; Mozart: Fantasia in d, K. 397; Sonata in C, K. 545; Beethoven: Für Elise; Sonata No. 20 in G, Op. 49, No. 2; Chopin: Waltz in D, Op. 64, No. 1 (Minute Waltz); Waltz in A, Op. 69, No. 1; Grande Valse Brillante in E, Op. 18; Debussy: The Girl With the Flaxen Hair; Clair de Lune; Schumann: Kinderszenen (From Foreign Lands and People, A Curious Story, An Important Event, Dreaming [Träumerei]); Prokofiev: March from Peter and the Wolf. CD, ESS.A.Y CD1006, 1990
- Bach/Mozart/Beethoven/Robert Schumann/Debussy/Brahms/Chopin/Tchaikovsky/Khachaturian. My Second Recital; Bach: Jesu, Joy of Man's Desiring; Mozart: Rondo alla Turca; Beethoven: Sonata No. 24 in F-sharp major, Op. 78, Adagio Cantabile, Allegro Vivace; Schumann: Arabesque; Debussy: Sarabande; Brahms: Waltz, Op. 39, No. 2 in E major; Waltz, Op. 39, No. 3 in G-sharp minor; Waltz, Op. 39, No. 4 in E minor; Waltz, Op. 39, No. 5 in E major; Waltz, Op. 39, No. 15 in A-flat major; Waltz in Intermezzo in E-flat major, Op. 117, No. 1; Chopin: Mazurka in F-sharp minor; Waltz in C-sharp minor; Nocturne in F-sharp minor; Tchaikovsky: Humoresque, Natha-Valse, Barcarolle; Khachaturian: Toccata. CD, ESS.A.Y CD1026, 1991
- Stravinsky/Rachmaninoff. Music from the Great Lakes Chamber Music Festival, Music for Two Pianos; James Tocco and Ruth Laredo; Stravinsky: Le Sacre du Printemps; Rachmaninoff: Suite No. 2 for 2 Pianos. CD, Gasparo GSCD-313, 1996; recorded 1995
- Rachmaninoff. Piano Concerto No. 3, Op. 30, Vladimir Feltsman (piano), Israel Philharmonic Orchestra (Zubin Mehta); Morceaux de salon Op. 10, Nos. 2, 3 and 7, Ruth Laredo (piano); Vocalise, Op. 34, No. 14, Nelly Lee (sprano), Novosibirsk Philharmonic Orchestra (Arnold Katz); Prelude, Op. 23, No. 5, Prelude, Op. 32, Nos. 5, 1, 7, 8 and 12, Ruth Laredo (piano); Symphonic Dances, Op. 45, Nos. 1, 2 and 3, Novosibirsk Philharmonic Orchestra (Arnold Katz); Etudes-Tableaux, Op. 39, Nos. 2, 5 and 6, Ruth Laredo (piano); Rhapsody on a Theme of Paganini, Op. 43, Vladimir Feltsman (piano), Israel Philharmonic Orchestra (Zubin Mehta). 2 CDs, Sony Classical SB2K 64 343, 1996
- Beethoven. 3 Sonatas; Sonata No. 23, Op. 57 (Appassionata); No. 17, Op. 31; No. 2 (Tempest); No. 26, Op. 81a (Les Adieux); Bagatelle for Piano in A minor (Für Elise); Bagatelle in B major. CD, Connoisseur Society CD-4210, 1997
- Mendelssohn/Robert Schumann/Clara Schumann/Brahms. Such Good Friends; Felix Mendelssohn: Introduction and Rondo capriccioso, Op. 14; Robert Schumann: Eight Fantasy Pieces, Op. 12 (Des Abends, Aufschwung, Warum?, Grillen, In der Nacht, Fabel, Traumes Wirren, Ende vom Lied); Clara Schumann: Romance, Op. 11, No. 1; Johannes Brahms: Intermezzi, Op. 117, Nos. 1, 2 and 3; Pieces for Piano, Op. 118, No. 2, 119, No. 1; Fantasia, Op. 116, No. 4. CD, Open Mike M 4022 (or Sanctuary CD 3001), 1999, recorded 1998
- Brahms. Piano Quartets No. 1, Op. 25, No. 2, Op. 26, No. 3, Op. 60, The Shanghai Quartet and Ruth Laredo (piano). 2 CDs, Arabesque Z6740-2, 2000; recorded April 1999
- Rorem. Chamber Music, Great Lakes Chamber Music Festival; Day Music: Ruth Laredo (piano), Philip Setzer (violin); War Scenes: Kurt Ollmann (baritone), Ned Rorem (piano); End of Summer: Elm City Ensemble. CD, Newport Classic NPD 85663, 2000; recorded June 1999
