= Shanghai Quartet =

String quartet in Shanghai, China

The Shanghai Quartet is a string quartet that formed in 1983. The quartet is made up of: first violinist Weigang Li, second violinist Angelo Xiang Yu, violist Honggang Li, and cellist Nicholas Tzavaras. On November 20, 2020 the ensemble announced the newest member, Angelo Xiang Yu. The Shanghai Quartet accepted the resignation of former violist Yi-Wen Jiang on March 17, 2020. The group's tours have included North America, South America, Japan, China, Australia, New Zealand, and Europe. Among their performances, the Shanghai Quartet has developed a long list of performance collaborators including Yo-Yo Ma, David Soyer, Eugenia Zukerman, Sharon Isbin, Ruth Laredo, Arnold Steinhardt, and Chanticleer.

== History ==
The group was formed in 1983 at the Shanghai Conservatory in China. In 1984 the quartet was selected by the Ministry of Culture (China) to compete at the Portsmouth International Quartet Competition in England where they won 2nd prize. The group then left China in 1985 to study at Northern Illinois University with the Vermeer Quartet until 1987. The Shanghai Quartet made its New York debut in 1987 at Town Hall. In 1989 they became the quartet-in-residence at the University of Richmond. In 2003 the quartet became Distinguished Visiting Artists of the school's Modlin Center for the Arts, giving concerts during the Great Performances season from September to May. They then were established as artists-in-residency at the John J. Cali School of Music at Montclair State University in New Jersey where they are currently located. The four members are also visiting guest professors at the Shanghai Conservatory and Central Conservatory of Music in China where they share in master-classes what they have learned in America. In the fall of 2020, they became resident faculty members at The Tianjin Juilliard School. A documentary film by Hal Rifken, titled Behind the Strings, was released in 2020, telling the adventuresome history of the musicians through their westward journeys out of the Cultural Revolution in China to their current lives on stage and at home in the US.

== Members ==
=== Weigang Li ===
Weigang Li is a native of Shanghai and began studying the violin at age five under the instruction of his parents. He began formal music education at the Shanghai Conservatory when he was 14 years old. In 1981 he studied at the San Francisco Conservatory of Music through an exchange program with the Shanghai Conservatory. Upon finishing his studies in 1985, Weigang became an assistant violin professor at Shanghai. He then left China to study at Northern Illinois University. From 1987 to 1989, he studied at the Juilliard School and was a teaching assistant to the Juilliard String Quartet. Weigang has been the first violinist for the Shanghai Quartet since its inception.

Weigang has been a soloist with the Asian Youth Orchestra, Shanghai Symphony Orchestra, BBC Symphony Orchestra, and BBC Scottish Symphony Orchestra. He appears in the film From Mao to Mozart: Isaac Stern in China. Weigang currently is on the faculty at the Bard College Conservatory of Music, an Artist-in-Residence at Montclair State University's John J. Cali School Of Music, and resident faculty at The Tianjin Juilliard School.

=== Angelo Xiang Yu ===
Angelo Xiang Yu was born in Inner Mongolia China and grew up in Shanghai. His early musical training was with violinist Qing Zheng at the Shanghai Conservatory. His first major international award was First Prize in the 2010 Yehudi Menuhin International Violin Competition. He is the recipient of a 2019 Avery Fisher Career Grant and a 2019 Lincoln Center Emerging Artist Award. Yu received his Bachelor's and Master's degrees and an Artist Diploma from the New England Conservatory. His teachers include Donald Weilerstein and Miriam Fried. Mr. Yu was chosen to be a member of the Chamber Music Society of Lincoln Center's The Bowers Program, joining in the fall of 2018.

=== Honggang Li ===
Honggang Li began his musical studies playing the violin like his brother Weigang, and formed the quartet with him He first attended the Beijing Conservatory and then the Shanghai Conservatory where he became a faculty member in 1984. Later in the United States, he became a teaching assistant at the Juilliard School in New York City. Honggang was the original first violinist for the Shanghai Quartet and later switched to second violin. When violist Zheng Wang left the group they had trouble finding a replacement violist, and upon accepting Yi-Wen Jiang, who the Li brothers had already known, as the second violinist, Honggang learned to play the viola in order to complete the quartet.

Honggang has been a soloist with the Shanghai Philharmonic and the Shanghai Conservatory Orchestra. In 1987 he was given a prize at the Premio Paolo Borciani Competition in Italy by Elisa Pegreffi.

=== Nicholas Tzavaras ===
Nicholas Tzavaras is the only American member of the Shanghai Quartet, having grown up in Harlem in New York City. He studied cello at the New England Conservatory and at the State University of New York Stony Brook. As a graduate student, he began a cello program for the Opus 118 Music Center in East Harlem. He is now an advisory board member for the program. Nicholas was previously on the faculty at the University of Richmond and is currently the string department coordinator and cello professor at Montclair State University. He became the cellist for the Shanghai Quartet in 2000 when past cellist James Wilson left the ensemble.

Nicholas has toured with Musicians from Marlboro and Madonna. He has made appearances on MTV, VH1, David Letterman, and at the White House to perform for President Bill Clinton. He has recorded for labels including Delos, BIS Records, Camerata, and New Albion. He has appeared in the Academy Award nominated documentary Small Wonders and in the major motion picture Music of the Heart with Meryl Streep.

=== Former members ===
Xing-Hua Ma, cellist 1983-1985. Zheng Wang, violist 1983-1994. Käthe Jarka, cellist 1986-1990. James Wilson, cellist 1990-2000. Yi-Wen Jiang, violinist 1994-2020.

== Discography ==
Year	Title	Label	Features
1994	Grieg and Mendelssohn Quartets	Delos	Mendelssohn Quartet No.2 in A major and Grieg Quartet in G minor, Op.27
1994	Spirit Murmur	Delos	Works by Alan Hovhaness including Three Bagatelles for String Quartet, Op. 30, String Quartet No. 1, Op. 8, and Suite from String Quartet No. 2
1995	Music for a Sunday Morning	Delos	Eugenia Zukerman and Anthony Newman, includes Ginastera Impresiones de la Puna, J.S. Bach Overture, Suite No. 2 in B minor BWV 1067
1995	Heigh-Ho Mozart (only tracks)	Delos	
1996	Mozart's Last Two Quartets	Delos	Includes Quartet No. 22 B-flat major K. 589 and Quartet No. 23 in F major K. 590
1997	The Hovhaness Collection (only tracks)	Delos	
1998	Shanghai Quartet Plays Brahms	Delos	Arnold Steinhardt, includes Quartet No. 3, Op. 67, Quintet No. 1, Op. 88
1998	Flowing Stream	Delos	Min Xiao-Fen, includes Zhou Long Chinese Folk Songs (arr.) and Poems from Tang
2000	Brahms Piano Quartets	Arabesque Recordings	Ruth Laredo, includes Quartet No. 1 in G minor, Op. 25, Quartet No. 3 in C minor, Op. 60, and Quartet No. 2 in A major, Op. 26
2001	Shanghai Quartet performs Ravel and Bridge	Delos	Includes Maurice Ravel String Quartet in F major, Frank Bridge Quartet in E minor, and Frank Bridge Novelletten
2002	Chinasong	Delos	Includes traditional and popular Chinese folk songs arranged for string quartet by Yi-Wen Jiang. Also features flautist Eugenia Zukerman.
2003	Bright Sheng: Silent Temple	Bis	Includes New Music from Composer Bright Sheng for Piano Trio as well as music for piano, strings, and pipa, a traditional Chinese instrument.
2004	Beethoven: The Razumovsky Quartets	Delos	Includes Beethoven String Quartet No. 8 in E minor, Op. 59/2, and No. 9 in C major, Op. 59/3
2005	Melinda and Melinda Soundtrack (only tracks)	Milan Records	Soundtrack for a Woody Allen Film, String Quartet No. 4
2005	Dvorák: String Quartet No. 12 "The American"; Mendelssohn: String Octet	Camerata	
2007	Beethoven: String Quartets	CD Accord	
2007	Beethoven: String Quartets	Camerata	Op. 18, Nos. 1-3
2008	Beethoven: String Quartets	Camerata	Op. 18, Nos. 4-6
