= Broadcast Film Critics Association Awards 2000 =

Broadcast Film Critics Association Awards 2000 may refer to:

- 5th Critics' Choice Awards, the fifth Critics' Choice Awards ceremony that took place in 2000
- 6th Critics' Choice Awards, the sixth Critics' Choice Awards ceremony that took place in 2001 and which honored the best in film for 2000
