= Roberta Guaspari =

American violinist and music educator (born 1947)

- Born: September 15, 1947 (age 77); Rome, New York, U.S.
- Occupations: Music Teacher

Roberta Guaspari (born September 15, 1947) is an American violinist and music educator. She is known for her work in Harlem, New York, where she taught during the 1980s and 1990s to keep music alive in inner-city schools. She was portrayed on film by Meryl Streep in Music of the Heart (1999), written by Pamela Gray for which Streep was nominated for an Academy Award as Guaspari. Guaspari was also the subject of the 1995 documentary Small Wonders. As of 2017, she is still an instructor of violin with Opus 118 in New York City.

== Life and career ==
Guaspari was born in Rome, New York, the daughter of Assunta "Sue" (née Vitali 1923–2013) and Guido "Guy" Guaspari (1917–1974). She has a sister, Lois, and two brothers, Alfred and Douglas. Her grandparents on both sides were from Italy. She graduated with a B.A. in music education from the State University of New York at Fredonia and a master's degree in music education from the Boston University College of Fine Arts.

She is divorced from her husband, George Tzavaras, with whom she had two sons, Nicholas and Alexi. She later adopted a daughter from El Salvador named Sophia.

She co-founded Opus 118, a school of music that provides music instruction and teacher development.

Select awards

- The Petra Foundation's annual award in 1992 to “recognize and encourage unsung individuals who are making distinctive contributions to human freedom.”
- Woman of the Year in 1994 by CBS This Morning.
- Heroes for Today Award by Reader's Digest.
- Outstanding Achievement Award by SUNY Fredonia Alumni Association in 1994.
- Arison Award in 2003 presented by NFAA National Foundation for Advancement in the Arts for her “significant influence in the development of young American artists.”
- American Eagle Awards in 2000 from the National Music Council of the United States.
- Barnard College Medal of Distinction, 2011.
