= Broadcast Film Critics Association Awards 1999 =

Broadcast Film Critics Association Awards 1999 may refer to:

- 4th Critics' Choice Awards, the fourth Critics' Choice Awards ceremony that took place in 1999
- 5th Critics' Choice Awards, the fifth Critics' Choice Awards ceremony that took place in 2000 and which honored the best in film for 1999
