= Toccata (Khachaturian) =

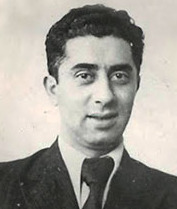
Aram Khachaturian in 1936

The Toccata in E♭ minor is a piece for solo piano written in 1932 by Aram Khachaturian. It is a favorite of piano students, and has been recorded many times.

Khachaturian wrote this work as the first movement of a three-movement suite for piano:

1. Toccata
2. Waltz – Capriccio
3. Dance

He wrote the suite in 1932 while studying at the Moscow Conservatory under Nikolai Myaskovsky. However, the Toccata became so well known so quickly that it is now considered a separate piece; the suite from which it came is little known. The first performance was given by then-classmate Lev Oborin, who also recorded it.

The Toccata utilises some Armenian and Caucasian folk melodies and rhythms, as well as baroque and contemporary 20th Century techniques. It begins Allegro marcatissimo. A central section Andante espressivo leads to a reprise of the opening motifs. The coda is based on the central section's theme. It lasts around 5 minutes.

Those who have recorded the Toccata include Benno Moiseiwitsch, Shura Cherkassky, Şahan Arzruni, Felicja Blumental, Mindru Katz, Ruth Laredo, Roland Pöntinen and Murray McLachlan.
