= Small Wonders =

1995 film

- Directed by: Allan Miller
- Produced by: Susan Kaplan; Allan Miller; Walter Scheuer
- Cinematography: Kramer Morgenthau
- Edited by: Allan Miller
- Production company: Four Oaks Foundation
- Distributed by: Miramax Films
- Release dates: 1995 (premiere); October 4, 1996
- Running time: 77 minutes
- Country: United States
- Languages: English; Spanish
- Box office: $20,819

Small Wonders (also known as Fiddlefest) is a 1995 American documentary film about Roberta Guaspari, a music teacher in East Harlem who teaches underprivileged children how to play the violin. Produced and directed by Allan Miller, it was nominated for an Academy Award for Best Documentary Feature.

== Participants ==
- Roberta Guaspari
- Arnold Steinhardt
- Isaac Stern
- Itzhak Perlman
- Deborah Meyer
- Sid Massey
- Kyle Haver
- Barry Solowey
- Lucy Matos

== See also ==
- Music of the Heart, a 1999 drama film based on Small Wonders
