= Michael Tree =

American violist (1934 - 2018)

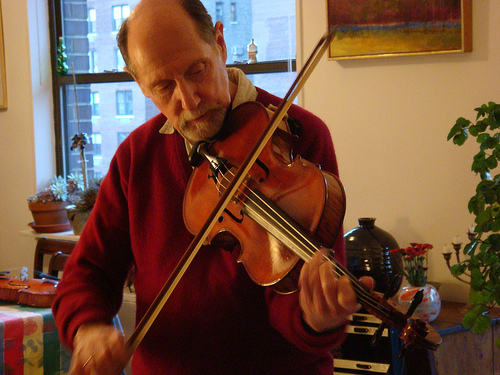

Background information
- Born: February 19, 1934; Newark
- Origin: Newark, New Jersey, United States
- Died: March 30, 2018 (aged 84) Manhattan, New York, United States
- Instrument: viola

Michael Tree (born Michael Applebaum; February 19, 1934 – March 30, 2018) was an American violist.

== Biography ==
Tree was born in Newark, New Jersey. His principal studies were with Efrem Zimbalist on violin and viola at the Curtis Institute of Music. Zimbalist insisted that Tree change his name from Applebaum (German for "apple tree") to advance his career. Subsequent to his Carnegie Hall recital debut at the age of 20, Tree appeared as violin and viola soloist with major orchestras, including the Philadelphia, Baltimore, Los Angeles, and New Jersey. As a founding member of the Marlboro Trio and the Guarneri Quartet, he played throughout the world and recorded more than 80 chamber music works. Prominent among these were ten piano quintets and quartets with Artur Rubinstein. Tree served on the faculty of the Curtis Institute of Music, The Juilliard School, Bard College Conservatory of Music, Manhattan School of Music, University of Maryland School of Music and Rutgers University, and regularly performed at the Marlboro Music School and Festival. He appeared as himself in the 1999 film Music of the Heart, starring Meryl Streep and, among other famous violinists, fellow Guarneri Quartet member Arnold Steinhardt, who, with his photographer wife Dorothea von Haeften, played an important role in the real life story.

In 1962, he was a soloist with the Naumburg Orchestral Concerts, in the Naumburg Bandshell, Central Park, in the summer series.

Tree played a circa 1780 43.25 cm (17 inch) Domenico Busan viola from Venice, Italy. He also played violas of the modern Japanese-American luthier Hiroshi Iizuka. During his early years with the Guarneri Quartet, Tree played on a viola made by mid-20th century luthier Harvey Fairbanks of Binghamton, New York.

Michael Tree received an honorary degree from Binghamton University.

Tree's father, Samuel Applebaum, was a nationally known violin pedagogue who wrote many articles and books about music and composed or edited extensive teaching materials.

Tree died of Parkinson's disease at his Manhattan apartment on March 30, 2018, at the age of 84.

== Discography ==
Outside of the chamber music recordings with the Guarneri Quartet, Tree recorded:

- Beethoven Serenade for Flute, Violin, and Viola with Eugenia and Pinchas Zukerman (on Columbia)
- Bolcom "Let Evening Come" with Benite Valente and Cynthia Raim (on Centaur Records)
- Brahms Viola Sonatas with Richard Goode (on Nonesuch) [1981]
- Brahms Horn Trio with Myron Bloom and Rudolf Serkin (on Sony Classical)
- Brahms G major Viola Quintet with Isaac Stern, Cho-Liang Lin, Jaime Laredo, and Yo-Yo Ma
- Brahms Sextets (on Sony) with Isaac Stern, Cho-Liang Lin, Jaime Laredo, Yo-Yo Ma, and Sharon Robinson
- Mendelssohn Octet with Jaime Laredo, Alexander Schneider, Arnold Steinhardt, John Dalley, Samuel Rhodes, Leslie Parnas, and David Soyer
- Mozart Violin and Viola Duos (on Nonesuch) with Violinist Toshiya Eto
- Mozart Concertone (for 2 violins and orchestra) with Jaime Laredo, violin, and Alexander Schneider conducting the Marlboro Festival Orchestra (on Columbia) (here Michael Tree plays violin.)
- Schmidt Piano Quintet in G (on Sony Classical) with Leon Fleisher, Joel Smirnoff, Joseph Silverstein and Yo-Yo Ma.
