= Ørnulf Gulbransen =

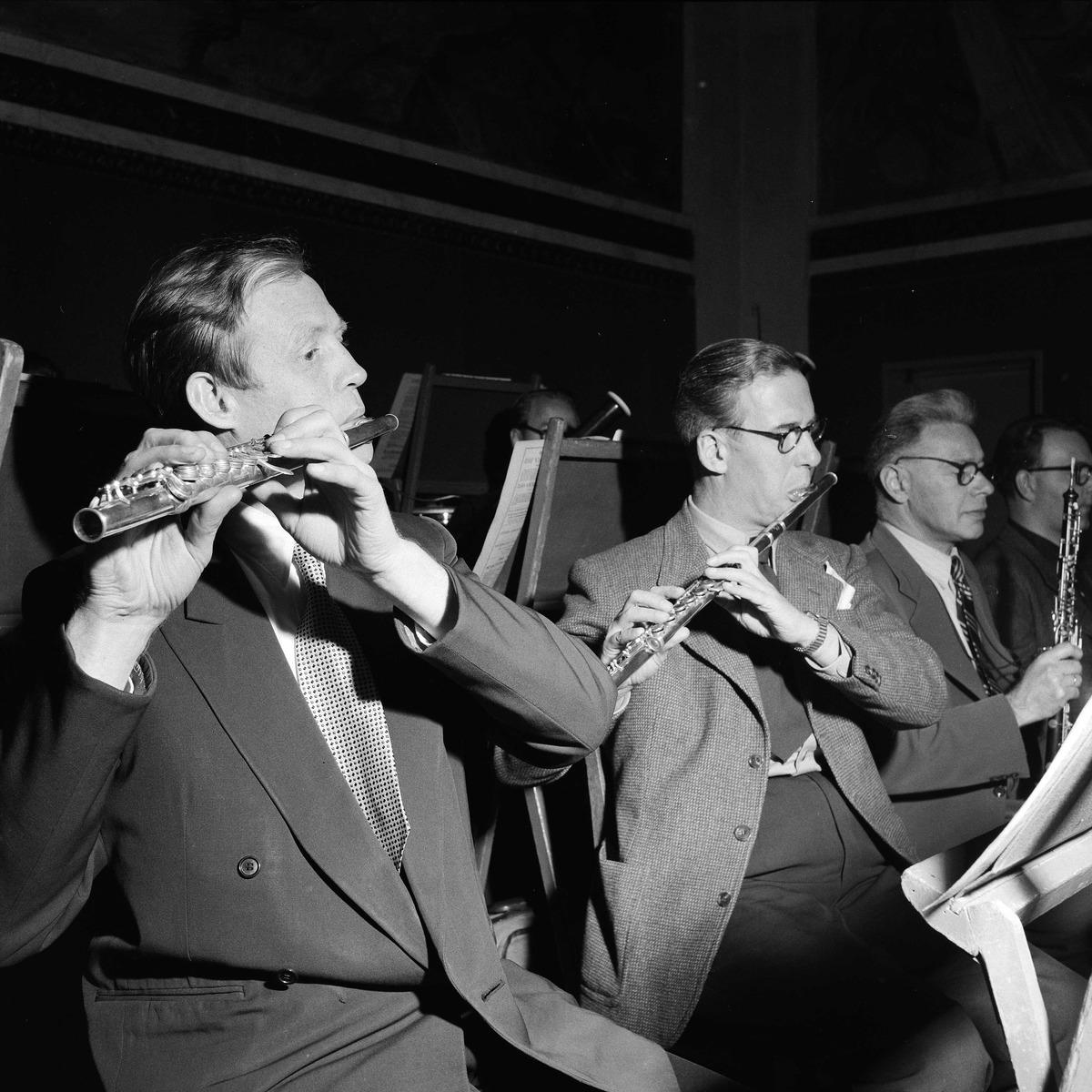
- Ørnulf Gulbransen at left, at a practice with in Universitetets Aula, 1953.

Background information
- Born: 19 December 1916; Kristiania (Oslo)
- Origin: Norway
- Died: 20 February 2004 (aged 87) Oslo
- Genres: Contemporary, classical music
- Occupation: Musician
- Instrument: Flute

Ørnulf Gulbransen (19 December 1916 – 20 February 2004) was a Norwegian classical musician (flute)

== Career ==
Gulbransen was born and died in Kristiania (Oslo), and had a leading position in Norwegian music for more than 50 years. In 1945 he married the violinist Elsa Lilian Gustavsen (born 1921). He was known as an outstanding flautist and flute teacher both in Norway and internationally. He had an immense influence as a soloist, chamber musician and professor at the Norwegian Academy of Music, and was a catalyst for the growth and progress on the Norwegian music scene over the last half century.

Gulbransen debuted in 1938, as solo flutist in Filharmonisk Selskaps orkester (1941–71) and primarius in Den Norske Blåsekvintett (1955–72). He gave extensive education, including at Oslo Musikkonservatorium, Ingesund College of Music (Musikhögskolan Ingesund) and the Royal Danish Academy of Music in Copenhagen. He was assigned Professor at the Norwegian Academy of Music (1975–84). For his educational efforts, he was awarded the Lindemanprisen 1985. In the years 1974–91 he was additionally regular instructor for the Canadian National Youth Orchestra. After retirement in 1984 he continued teaching music at the Barratt Due Institute of Music. His recordings included the Brandenburg concertos by J.S. Bach with Rudolf Serkin and Pablo Casals.

== Honors ==
- 1956: Norwegian Music Critics Award
- 1985: Lindeman award, for his educational efforts

== Discography ==
- 1964: J.S. Bach: Brandenburg Concerto No. 4 & No. 5 (Columbia Masterworks Series/Sony Classical 1990), feat. Rudolf Serkin with Members of the Marlboro Festival Orchestra, conducted by Pablo Casals
- 1966: J.S. Bach: Brandenburg Concerto No. 2 (Columbia Masterworks Series/Sony Classical 1990), feat. Rudolf Serkin with Members of the Marlboro Festival Orchestra conducted by Pablo Casals
- 1976: J.S. Bach: Chromatic Fantasy, Italian Concerto & Goldberg Variations (Aria) (Columbia Masterworks Series/Sony Classical 1990, 2002), feat. Rudolf Serkin with Members of the Marlboro Festival Orchestra conducted by Pablo Casals
- 1991: Ørnulf Gulbransen, Flute – Radio Performances 1960–1976 (Simax Classics)
- 1993: Edvard Fliflet Bræin: Orchestral Works (Simax Classics), feat. Eva Knardahl & Bergen Philharmonic Orchestra conducted by Sverre Bruland & Karsten Andersen
- 1994: Carl Gustav Sparre Olsen & Johann Kvandal: Norwegian Music For Flute (Simax Classics)
