= Music of the Heart =

1999 film by Wes Craven

- Theatrical release poster
- Directed by: Wes Craven
- Written by: Pamela Gray
- Produced by: Susan Kaplan; Marianne Maddalena; Allan Miller; Walter Scheuer
- Starring: Meryl Streep; Aidan Quinn; Angela Bassett; Gloria Estefan; Jane Leeves; Kieran Culkin; Jay O. Sanders
- Cinematography: Peter Deming
- Edited by: Gregg Featherman; Patrick Lussier
- Music by: Mason Daring
- Production company: Craven/Maddalena Productions
- Distributed by: Miramax Films
- Release dates: September 6, 1999 (Venice); October 29, 1999 (United States)
- Running time: 124 minutes
- Country: United States
- Language: English
- Budget: $27 million
- Box office: $15 million

Music of the Heart is a 1999 American biographical musical drama film directed by Wes Craven and written by Pamela Gray, based on the 1995 documentary Small Wonders. A dramatization of the true story of Roberta Guaspari, portrayed by Meryl Streep, who co-founded the Opus 118 Harlem School of Music and fought for music education funding in New York City public schools, the film also stars Aidan Quinn, Angela Bassett, Gloria Estefan in her film debut, Jane Leeves, Kieran Culkin and Jay O. Sanders. It was Craven's sole mainstream cinematic film not in the horror or thriller genre, and also his only film to receive Oscar nominations.

== Plot ==
In 1981 New York City, violinist Roberta Guaspari has recently divorced her U.S. Navy officer husband Charles Demetras, who has instead decided to pursue a romantic relationship with a friend of hers named Lana Holden. Encouraged by her mother Assunta to return to the workforce for the sake of her two sons Alexi and Nicholas, Guaspari attempts to rebuild her life and reconnects with a former classmate named Brian Turner while working as a gift-wrapper at a department store; recalling her childhood love for playing the violin, he arranges for her to be introduced to Janet Williams, the head teacher and principal of East Harlem's Central Park East School. Despite having little experience in actual music teaching, she accepts a substitute violin teaching position at Central Park East, even supplying 50 child-size violins she purchased while living in Greece, where her husband was based. With a combination of her toughness and determination, she inspires a group of children, and their initially skeptical parents. The program slowly develops and attracts publicity, eventually expanding to Central Park East II and River East Schools.

Ten years later, the Central Park East, Central Park East II and River East School string programs work with the New York City Board of Education to help eliminate funding for the programs, which leads to Guaspari's early dismissal. Determined to fight the budget cuts, she enlists the support of former pupils, parents and teachers, and over the next two years, she plans a benefit concert, Fiddlefest, to raise money so that the program can continue. However, a few weeks before the concert, and with all participants furiously rehearsing, they lose the venue. However, Arnold Steinhardt, a violinist in the Guarneri Quartet and the husband of a publicist friend, enlists the support of other well-known musicians, including Isaac Stern and Itzhak Perlman. They arrange for the concert to be mounted at Carnegie Hall. On the day of Fiddlefest, Guaspari and her students perform with Perlman, Steinhardt, Stern, Mark O'Connor, Michael Tree, Charles Veal Jr., Karen Briggs, Sandra Park, Diane Monroe, and Joshua Bell, increasing donations and making the event a massive success.

The epilogue explains that following the events of the film, the $250,000 in proceeds from the concert supported Guaspari's program for three years, during which she and her supporters continued to fund her work through benefit concerts and donations to their private foundation, the Opus 118 Harlem School of Music; Community School District 4 assisted as permitted by its limited resources. Eventually, her violin program was officially reinstated during the production of the film. In addition, she still teaches in East Harlem, where she lives with her daughter Sophia, whom she adopted from El Salvador in 1991. Her eldest son Nicholas has become a professional cellist in a graduate music program, and her youngest son Alexi has been accepted to medical school. Opus 118, which hopes to expand its outreach to more children, remains dependent on the generosity of its donors.

== Cast ==
- Meryl Streep as Roberta Guaspari
- Aidan Quinn as Brian Turner, Roberta's love interest
- Angela Bassett as Janet Williams, the school principal who champions Roberta's cause
- Gloria Estefan as Isabel Vasquez, a teacher who becomes one of Roberta's earliest allies
- Cloris Leachman as Assunta Vitali Guaspari, Roberta's well-meaning but overbearing and acerbic mother
- Josh Pais as Dennis Rausch, a cynical music teacher
- Jane Leeves as Dorothea von Haeften, a wealthy socialite and photographer with connections in the world of classical music
- Kieran Culkin as Alexander ("Alexi"), Roberta's youngest son
  - Henry Dinhofer as Young Alexi
- Charlie Hofheimer as Nicholas, Roberta's eldest son
  - Michael Angarano as Young Nick
- Jay O. Sanders as Dan Paxton, Roberta's other love interest
- Jean-Luke Figueroa as Ramon Olivas, a student
- Omari Toomer as DeSean, a student
  - Jade Yorker as Young DeSean
- Cristina Gómez as Lucy, a student
  - Victoria Gómez as Young Lucy
- Olga Merediz as Concepcion Olivas, Ramon's mother
- Hazel Medina as Alice Crowley
- Adam LeFevre as Mr. Klein
- Betsy Aidem as Mrs. Lamb
- Myra Lucretia Taylor as Beverly Wilson
- Socorro Santiago as Lucy's Mother
- Arthur French as Ernie, the electrician
- Sophia Guaspari (the real-life Roberta's adopted daughter) as Rosario

Itzhak Perlman, Arnold Steinhardt, Isaac Stern, Mark O'Connor, Michael Tree, Charles Veal Jr., Karen Briggs, Sandra Park, Diane Monroe, and Joshua Bell all cameo as themselves in the film's recreation of the Carnegie Hall benefit concert (at which all were actually present).

== Production ==
Roberta Guaspari and the Opus 118 Harlem School of Music was featured in the 1995 documentary film Small Wonders, which was later nominated for an Academy Award for Best Documentary Feature. After seeing Small Wonders, Wes Craven, known for his work on horror films, was inspired to make a full-length film about Guaspari. Immediately following a phenomenally successful preview screening of Scream, Miramax co-founders Harvey and Bob Weinstein offered him a three-picture deal via Dimension Films; two of the films would be in the horror genre, while the third film would be a "petticoat film", a costume drama for which the Weinsteins were known at the time. Craven, both a former teacher and a fan of classical music, chose to pursue Music of the Heart as his "petticoat film", explaining, "It's sort of a culmination of almost 30 years trying to do something outside of the genre. Not because I don’t like the genre, but because I'm a person … an artist who wants to do a lot of different things. Just never before has that opportunity been presented."

Madonna was originally signed to play the role of Guaspari, but left the project before filming began, citing "creative differences" with Craven. When she left, Madonna had already studied for many months to play the violin. Meryl Streep, who replaced Madonna at the last minute at Craven's insistence, learned to play Bach's Concerto for 2 Violins for the film; given six weeks of preparation in order to play the violin, she described, "I had to beg them to give me some more time for the violin part of it." Aside from having the daunting task of learning the violin while acting like a professional, she also found the burden of playing a real person to be particularly challenging, explaining, "Playing a real person carries with it a whole other set of responsibilities than you would have when creating a fictional character. So, I did as much research as I could and then I just sort of threw it away because I can't think of the real Roberta. I had to make it our Roberta, our movie Roberta. The real woman is a sizable phenomenon of energy, inspiration, hard work, irascibility. I tried to capture little parts of her and put it together in the film."

== Critical reception ==
The film received an overall mixed reception, though many reviews tended to be slightly positive. Most critics applauded Meryl Streep's portrayal of Roberta Guaspari. The film has a 63% approval rating from Rotten Tomatoes based on 90 critical reviews; the consensus explains, "Meryl Streep's depiction of an ordinary person doing extraordinary things transcends, inspires, and entertains." Metacritic, which uses a weighted average, assigned the film a score of 54 out of 100, based on 33 critics, indicating "mixed or average" reviews. CinemaScore reported that audiences gave the film a rare "A+" grade.

Critic Eleanor Ringel Gillespie of the Atlanta Journal-Constitution concluded that "There are more challenging movies around. More original ones, too. But "Music of the Heart" gets the job done, efficiently and entertainingly."

Roger Ebert gave the film three stars out of four and wrote that "Meryl Streep is known for her mastery of accents; she may be the most versatile speaker in the movies. Here you might think she has no accent, unless you've heard her real speaking voice; then you realize that Guaspari's speaking style is no less a particular achievement than Streep's other accents. This is not Streep's voice, but someone else's - with a certain flat quality, as if later education and refinement came after a somewhat unsophisticated childhood."

Steve Rosen said that "The key to Meryl Streep's fine performance is that she makes Guaspari unheroically ordinary. Ultimately that makes her even more extraordinary."

=== Box office ===
The film opened at #5 at the North American box office making $3.6 million in its opening weekend.

=== Accolades ===
Award	Category	Nominee(s)	Result
Academy Awards	Best Actress	Meryl Streep	Nominated
Academy Awards	Best Original Song	"Music of My Heart"; Music and Lyrics by Diane Warren	Nominated
ALMA Awards	Outstanding Actress in a Feature Film	Gloria Estefan	Nominated
ASCAP Film and Television Music Awards	Most Performed Songs from Motion Pictures	"Music of My Heart"; Music and Lyrics by Diane Warren	Won
Black Reel Awards	Outstanding Supporting Actress	Angela Bassett	Nominated
Blockbuster Entertainment Awards	Favorite Song from a Movie	Gloria Estefan featuring NSYNC – "Music of My Heart"	Won
Critics' Choice Movie Awards	Best Song	"Music of My Heart"; Music and Lyrics by Diane Warren	Won
Golden Globe Awards	Best Actress in a Motion Picture – Drama	Meryl Streep	Nominated
Golden Reel Awards	Best Sound Editing – Music – Musical Feature (Foreign & Domestic)	Bill Abbott	Nominated
Grammy Awards	Best Song Written for a Motion Picture, Television or Other Visual Media	"Music of the Heart" – Diane Warren	Nominated
NAACP Image Awards	Outstanding Supporting Actress in a Motion Picture	Angela Bassett	Won
Nickelodeon Kids' Choice Awards	Favorite Song from a Movie	Gloria Estefan & NSYNC – "Music of My Heart"	Nominated
Screen Actors Guild Awards	Outstanding Performance by a Female Actor in a Leading Role	Meryl Streep	Nominated
Young Artist Awards	Best Family Feature Film – Drama		Won
Young Artist Awards	Best Performance in a Feature Film or TV Movie – Young Ensemble	Michael Angarano, Melay Araya, Henry Dinhoffer, Jean Luke Figueroa, Victoria Gomez, Justin Spaulding, Zoe Sternbach-Taubman and Jade Yorker	Nominated
YoungStar Awards	Best Young Actor in a Drama Film	Michael Angarano	Nominated

== Soundtrack album track listing ==
1. "Music of My Heart" - Gloria Estefan and *NSYNC (4:32)
2. "Baila" - Jennifer Lopez (3:54)
3. "Turn the Page" - Aaliyah (4:16)
4. "Groove with Me Tonight" (Pablo Flores English radio version) - MDO (4:37)
5. "Seventeen" - Tre O (3:48)
6. "One Night with You" - C Note (5:04)
7. "Do Something" (Organized Noize Mix) - Macy Gray (3:53)
8. "Revancha de Amor" - Gizelle d'Cole (4:06)
9. "Nothing Else" - Julio Iglesias Jr. (4:23)
10. "Love Will Find You" - Jaci Velasquez (4:34)
11. "Music of My Heart" (Lawrence Dermer Remix); mislabeled as "Pablo Flores Remix" - Gloria Estefan and *NSYNC (4:23)
12. "Concerto in D Minor for Two Violins" - Johann Sebastian Bach, played by Itzhak Perlman and Joshua Bell (3:56)

=== Certifications ===
Region	Certification	Certified units/sales
United States (RIAA)	Gold	500,000^{^}
^{^} Shipments figures based on certification alone.
