= St. Petersburg String Quartet =

St. Petersburg String Quartet (Russian: Санкт-Петербургский Струнный квартет; formed 1985) is a Russian string quartet. Their interpretations and recordings of Shostakovich, Tchaikovsky, Borodin, Prokofiev and Glazunov string quartets has been published by such labels as Sony, Melodiya, Hyperion, Delos, Dorian and Marquis.

== History ==
It was created by students of Leningrad Conservatory who studied in the quartet class Vladimir Ovcharek. It was originally called the String Quartet of the Leningrad Conservatory, before it was renamed to St. Petersburg String Quartet.

In the first two years, the band became a laureate of the All-Union Quartet Competition and the First International Shostakovich Competition. In 1989-1991, the quartet entered the international arena, winning awards at chamber ensemble competitions in Tokyo, Florence and Melbourne. In 1995 and 1996, the quartet toured the United States, and in 1996-1997 and 1999-2003, it was a resident at Oberlin College. In 1998, it debuted in Great Britain, including at the Aldeburgh Festival. American reviewers were generous in their praise of the musicians' work: the Los Angeles Times noted their "voluminous, rich sound", and Washington Post singled out the quartet's performance of Dmitri Shostakovich, to which the musicians "brought unsurpassed technique and intonation, and most importantly, the right emotional intensity".

In 1990, the musicians released their first CD through "Melodiya", recorded alongside the quartets Maurice Ravel and Arthur Honegger, — Ilya Teplyakov (second violin), Andrey Gadadin (viola) and Leonid Shukaev (cello) played together with Alla Aranovskaya. In 1994-1995, the pieces for the string quartet were recorded for the Sony Classical label Pyotr Tchaikovsky (double album) and two CDs with six quartets by Shostakovich; one of them (Quartets No. 3, 5 and 7) was nominated for the Grammy Award in the nomination "Best Chamber Music Performance", however, the company did not continue its collaboration with the performers who planned to record all of Shostakovich's string quartets. This plan was realized in 1999-2004 with the British company Hyperion. One of the discs (quartets No. 5, 7 and 9) was recognized as the best chamber recording of 2001 by Chamber Music America and the radio station WQXR. In 2001, they released two works of Alexander Borodin. The quartet also recorded works by Felix Mendelssohn, Antonín Dvořák, Claude Debussy, Alexandra Glazunova, Sergei Prokofiev, as well as the Georgian composer Zurab Nadareishvili, with whom the band had a long-term collaboration: the musicians performed the premiere of his first quartet (1987), and the second was written by their order; in total, the quartet was the first performer of five of his works.

== Members ==
- Alla Aranovskaya Russian: Алла Арановская- 1st violin
- Ned Kelleberger Russian: Нед Келленбергер- 2nd violin
- Boris Vayner Russian: Борис Вайнер- Viola
- Sascha Groschang Russian: Саша Грошанг -cello
