= 5th Critics' Choice Awards =

2000 US film awards

- Date: January 24, 2000
- Official website: www.criticschoice.com

Highlights
- Best Film: American Beauty

The 5th Critics' Choice Awards were presented on January 24, 2000, honoring the finest achievements of 1999 filmmaking.

== Top 10 films ==
(in alphabetical order)

- American Beauty
- Being John Malkovich
- The Cider House Rules
- The Green Mile
- The Insider
- Magnolia
- Man on the Moon
- The Sixth Sense
- The Talented Mr. Ripley
- Three Kings

== Winners ==
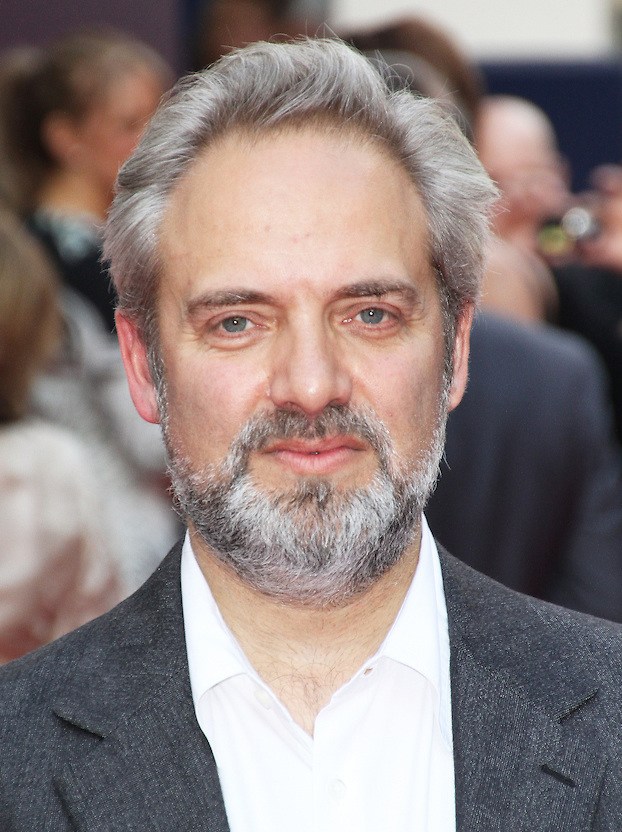
Sam Mendes, Best Director winner

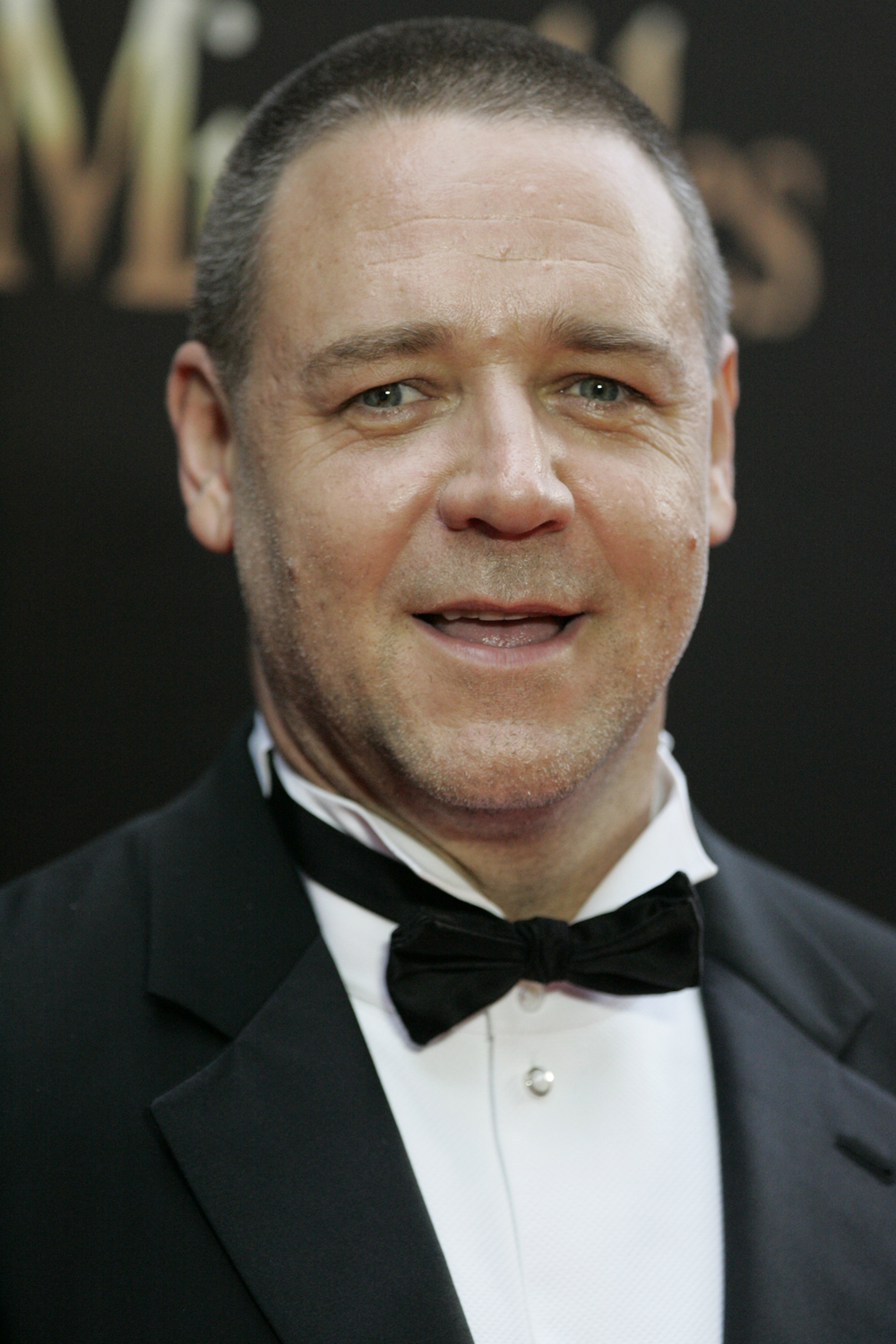
Russell Crowe, Best Actor winner

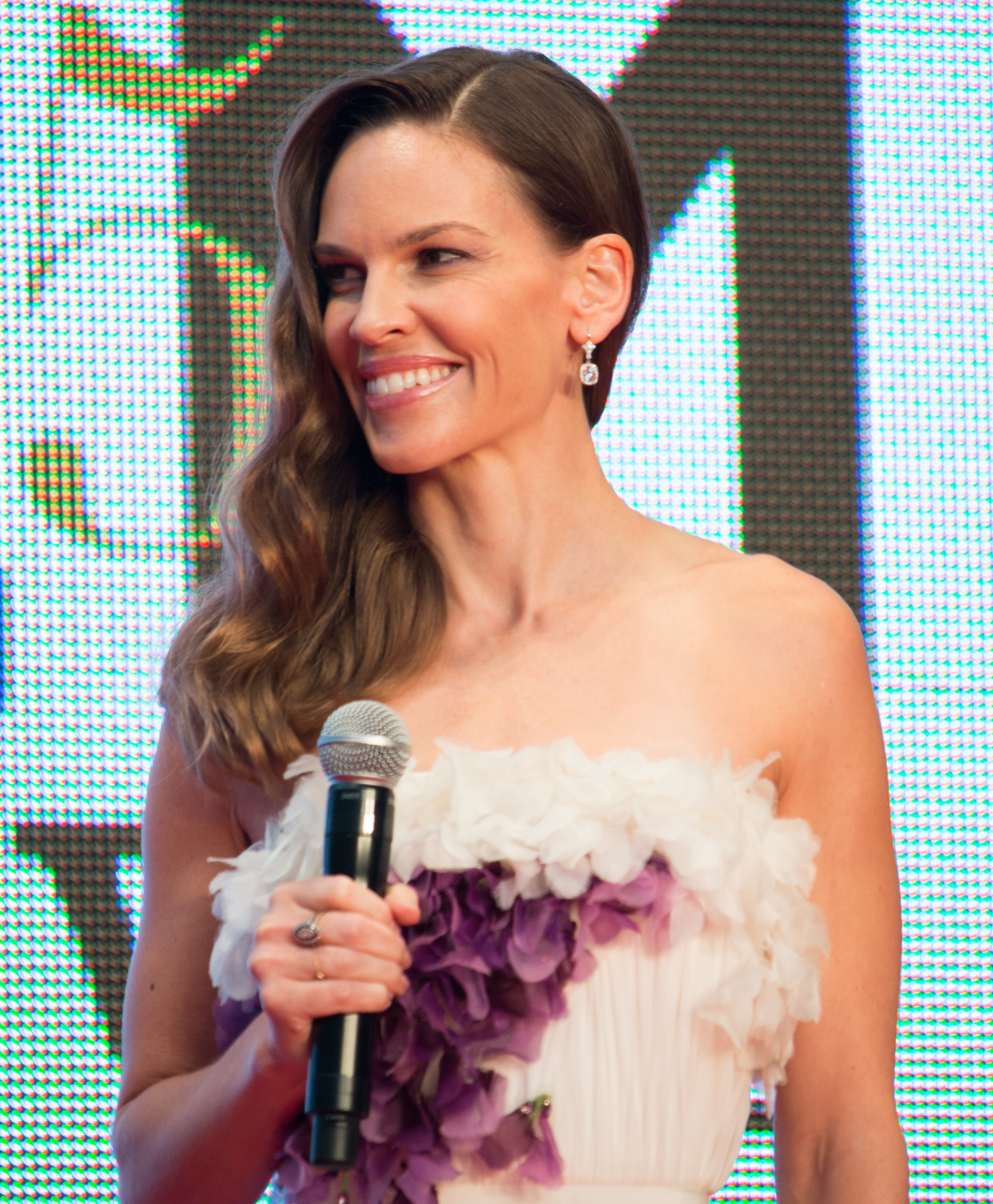
Hilary Swank, Best Actress winner

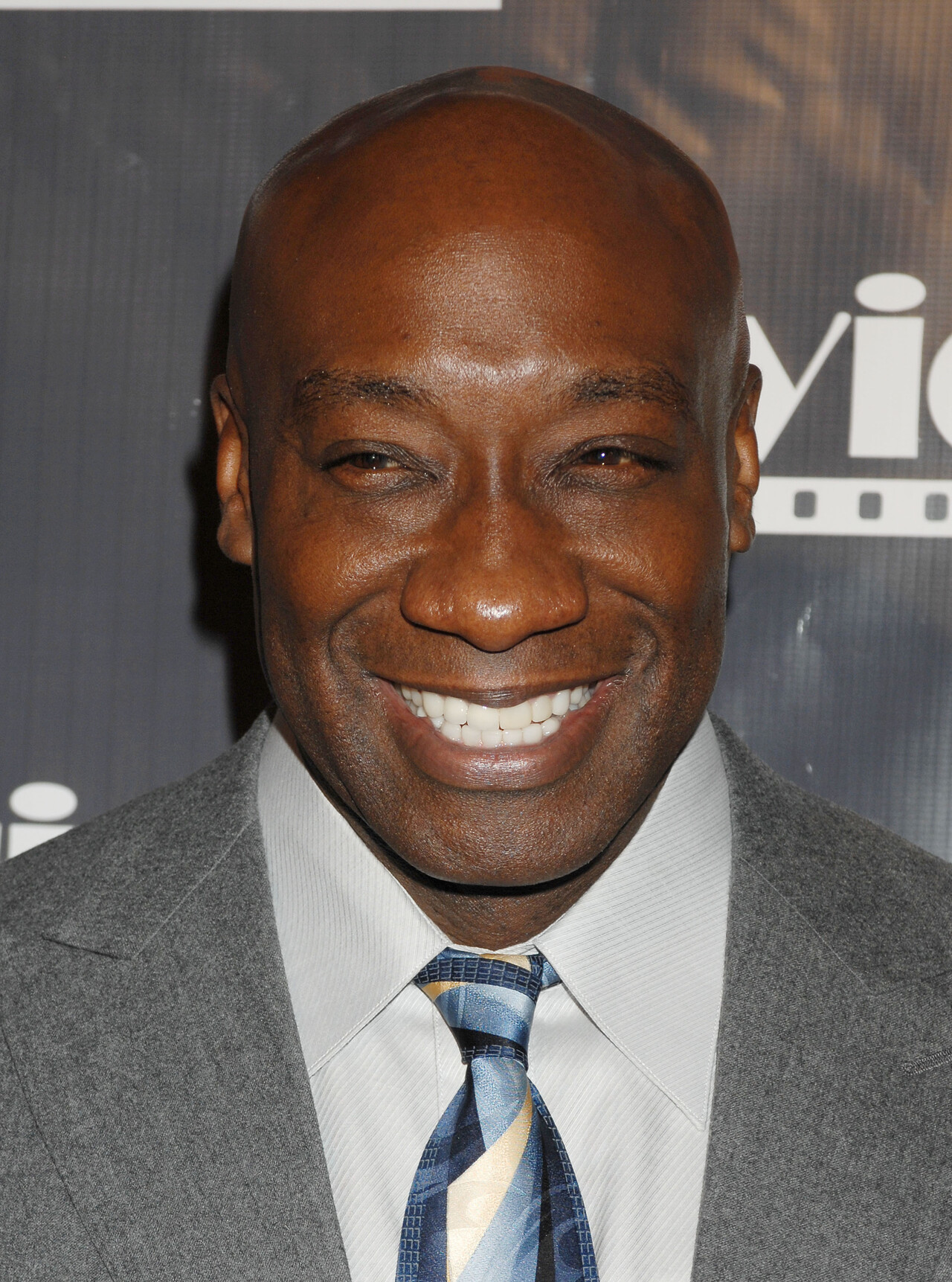
Michael Clarke Duncan, Best Supporting Actor winner

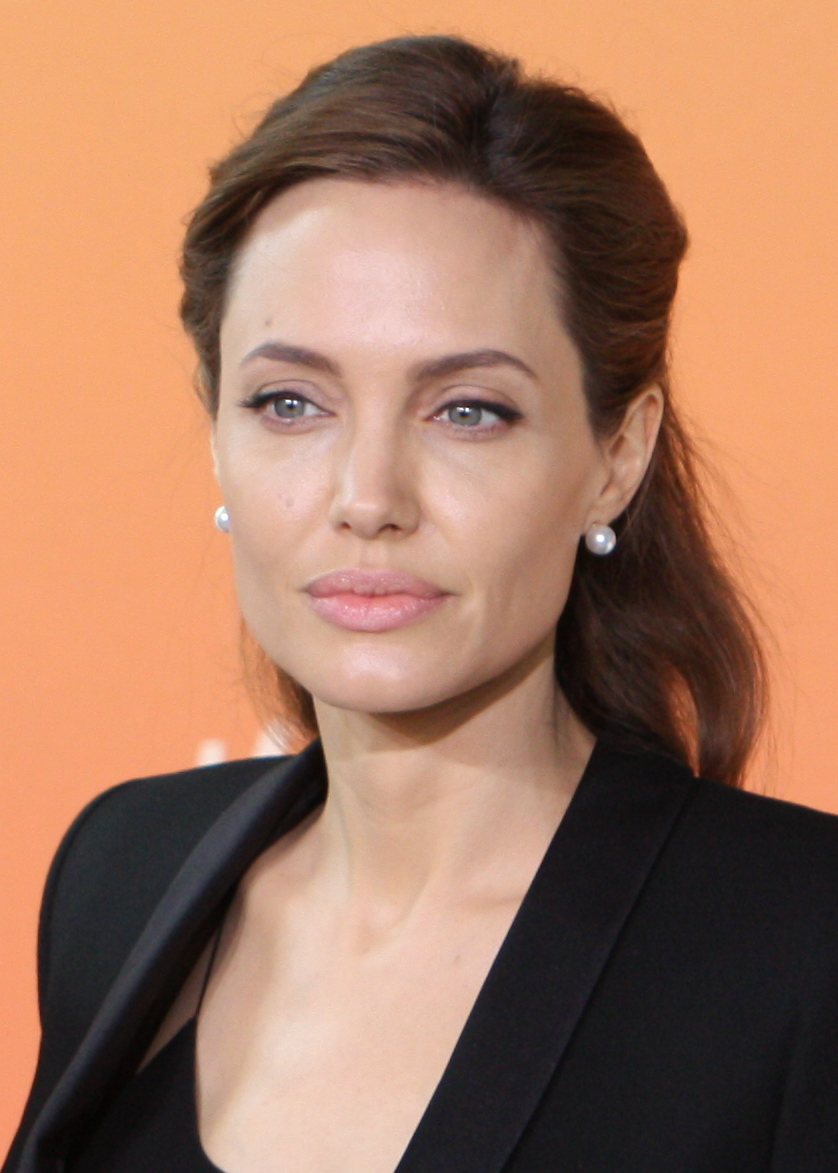
Angelina Jolie, Best Supporting Actress winner

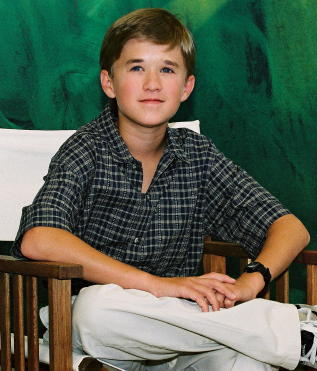
Haley Joel Osment, Best Child Performer winner

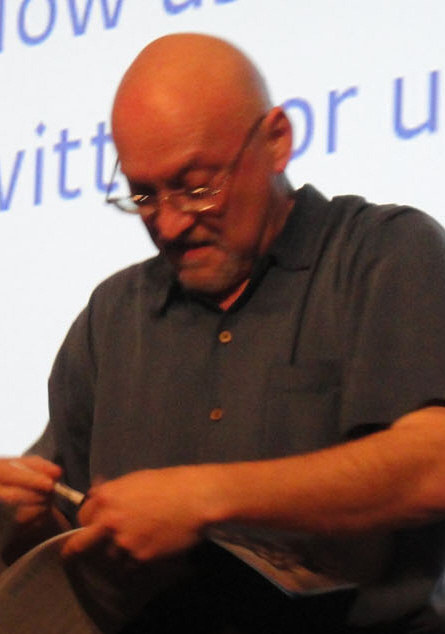
Frank Darabont, Best Adapted Screenplay winner

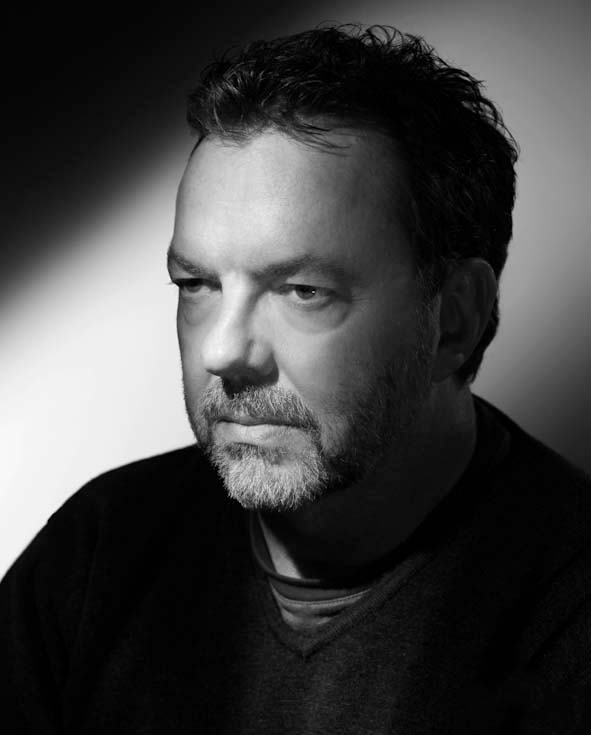
Alan Ball, Best Original Screenplay winner

- Best Actor:
  - Russell Crowe – The Insider
- Best Actress:
  - Hilary Swank – Boys Don't Cry
- Best Animated Feature:
  - Toy Story 2
- Best Child Performer:
  - Haley Joel Osment – The Sixth Sense
- Best Composer:
  - Gabriel Yared – The Talented Mr. Ripley
- Best Director:
  - Sam Mendes – American Beauty
- Best Family Film:
  - October Sky
- Best Feature Documentary:
  - Buena Vista Social Club
- Best Foreign Language Film:
  - All About My Mother (Todo sobre mi madre) • Spain
- Best Picture:
  - American Beauty
- Best Picture Made For Television:
  - RKO 281 / Tuesdays with Morrie (TIE)
- Best Screenplay – Adapted:
  - The Green Mile – Frank Darabont
- Best Screenplay – Original:
  - American Beauty – Alan Ball
- Best Song:
  - "Music of My Heart" – Music of the Heart
- Best Supporting Actor:
  - Michael Clarke Duncan – The Green Mile
- Best Supporting Actress:
  - Angelina Jolie – Girl, Interrupted
- Breakthrough Performer:
  - Spike Jonze – Being John Malkovich and Three Kings
