= Arnold Steinhardt =

American violinist

- Born: April 1, 1937 (age 89); Los Angeles, California, US
- Education: Curtis Institute of Music
- Occupation: violinist

Arnold Steinhardt (born April 1, 1937 in Los Angeles, California) is an American violinist, best known as the first violinist of the Guarneri String Quartet.

Steinhardt made his debut with the Los Angeles Philharmonic Orchestra at the age of 14. He studied at the Curtis Institute of Music in Philadelphia with Ivan Galamian and later in Switzerland with Joseph Szigeti and Toscha Seidel. In 1958, he won the Leventritt International Violin competition and consequently was invited by George Szell to take second chair in the Cleveland Orchestra's first violin section (next to concertmaster Josef Gingold). He was later appointed to the faculty of the Curtis Institute, Rutgers, the State University of New Jersey, and University of Maryland. In 2009, he was appointed to the faculty of the Colburn School in Los Angeles. He has also performed extensively as a soloist.

He lives in Santa Fe, New Mexico, and is the author of two books: Indivisible by Four: A String Quartet in Pursuit of Harmony, an account of his life in the Guarneri String Quartet, and Violin Dreams, an autobiography about his life and experiences as a violinist. He appeared as himself in the 1999 film Music of the Heart, starring Meryl Streep and also featuring violinists Isaac Stern and Itzhak Perlman. His wife, Dorothea von Haeften, is a supporting character in the film, played by Jane Leeves.

Arnold Steinhardt received an honorary degree from Binghamton University.

== Works ==
- Steinhardt, Arnold, Violin Dreams, Houghton Mifflin, 2006, ISBN 978-0-618-36892-1
- Steinhardt, Arnold, Indivisible by Four: A String Quartet in Pursuit of Harmony, Farrar Straus Giroux, 1999, ISBN 0-374-23670-4
