= Cello Sonata (Rachmaninoff) =

1901 composition by Sergei Rachmaninoff

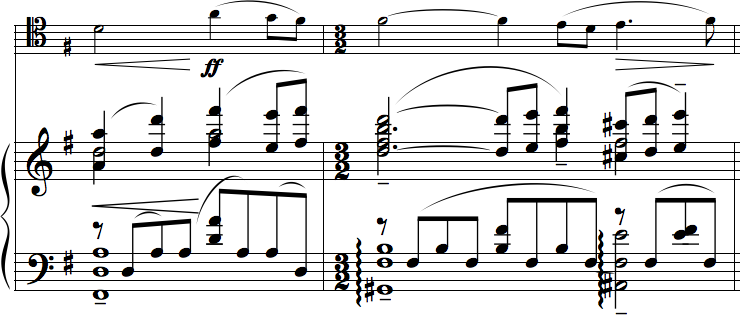
A few bars from the 4th movement

Sergei Rachmaninoff's Sonata in G minor for Cello and Piano, Op. 19, was completed on 20 November 1901; it was premiered by cellist Anatoliy Brandukov, the dedicatee of the work and Rachmaninoff's friend, with the composer at the piano, on 2 December 1901 in Moscow. The final version was completed 10 days after the premiere, 12 December 1901.

Rachmaninoff regarded the role of the piano as not just an accompaniment but equal to the cello. Most of the themes are introduced by the piano, while they are embellished and expanded in the cello's part.

== History ==
After the failure of the premiere of his Symphony No. 1 (Op. 13) in March 1897, Rachmaninoff continued to compose some short pieces for piano, song and choral work while appearing in a number of concerts as an opera conductor. Just as he was finally beginning to recover from his ordeal, in January 1900, he had the opportunity to meet with Leo Tolstoy. However, he once again lost confidence after receiving harsh criticism for his original song "Fate" (Op. 21-1). After an unsuccessful meeting with Tolstoy meant to revoke his writer's block, relatives decided to introduce Rachmaninoff to the neurologist Nikolai Dahl, to which Rachmaninoff agreed without resistance. Between January and April 1900, Rachmaninoff underwent hypnotherapy and supportive therapy sessions with Dahl on a daily basis for over three months, specifically structured to improve his sleep patterns, mood, and appetite and reignite his desire to compose. That summer, Rachmaninoff felt that "new musical ideas began to stir" and successfully resumed composition.

In July 1900, Rachmaninoff finally composed the "Love Duet", a key scene in the opera Francesca da Rimini, which was to be completed in 1906. This song was written earlier than his Piano Concerto No.2, which he began composing in the autumn of 1900, and the "Love Duet" became an important work that marked Rachmaninoff's rebirth as a composer. In particular, there are natural similarities in their lyricism between the three works composed around the same time: Suite No. 2 for Two Pianos (Op. 17), Piano Concerto No. 2 (Op. 18), and the Cello Sonata (Op. 19).

The opening of the first movement of the cello sonata alludes to Rachmaninoff's "signature" Gregorian chant, "Dies irae", and the first two cello notes imply the hidden word "Warum?" (German for "Why?"). The latter was revealed in Yuki Ito's 2023 monograph commemorating the composer's 150th birth anniversary. This "Warum?" motif appears frequently in the sonata in different forms. Throughout the work, there are references to the bells of Russian Orthodox churches (carillons) and homages to Rachmaninoff's Symphony No. 1, which he held dear for his entire life, making this sonata a masterpiece that displays Rachmaninoff's distinctive characteristics.

== Music ==
As typical of sonatas in the Romantic period, it has four movements:

1. Lento – Allegro moderato (G minor)
2. Allegro scherzando (C minor)
3. Andante (E♭ major)
4. Allegro mosso (G major)

The work takes approximately 35 minutes to perform.

== Arrangement ==
- Arcadi Volodos has transcribed the Andante (third movement) of the work for piano solo; he recorded his transcription for Sony Classical (64384) in 2000.

== Notable recordings ==
- 1956 Daniil Shafran, Yakov Flier
- 1956 Zara Nelsova, Artur Balsam
- 1958 Mstislav Rostropovich, Alexander Dedyukhin (repeat in the 1st movement is omitted)
- 1967 Paul Tortelier, Aldo Ciccolini
- 1984 Lynn Harrell, Vladimir Ashkenazy (repeat in the 1st movement is omitted)
- 1990 Yo-Yo Ma, Emanuel Ax
- 1994 Truls Mørk, Jean-Yves Thibaudet
- 2002 Steven Isserlis, Stephen Hough
- 2004 Natalia Gutman, Eliso Virsaladze
- 2005 Mischa Maisky, Sergio Tiempo
- 2006 Gautier Capuçon, Gabriela Montero
- 2006 Alexander Kniazev, Nikolai Lugansky
- 2007 Alexander Ivashkin, Rustem Hayroudinoff
- 2008 David Geringas, Ian Fountain
- 2012 Yuki Ito, Sofya Gulyak (Complete Rachmaninov Cello Works)
- 2012 Steven Doane, Barry Snyder
- 2012 Sol Gabetta, Olga Kern
- 2013 Julian Steckel, Paul Rivinius
- 2021 Pablo Ferrández, Denis Kozhukhin
- 2022 Jean-Guihen Queyras, Alexander Melnikov
