= Bacem Anas Romdhani =

Tunisian-British classical violinist (born 1995)

Bacem Anas Romdhani باسم أنس الرمضاني
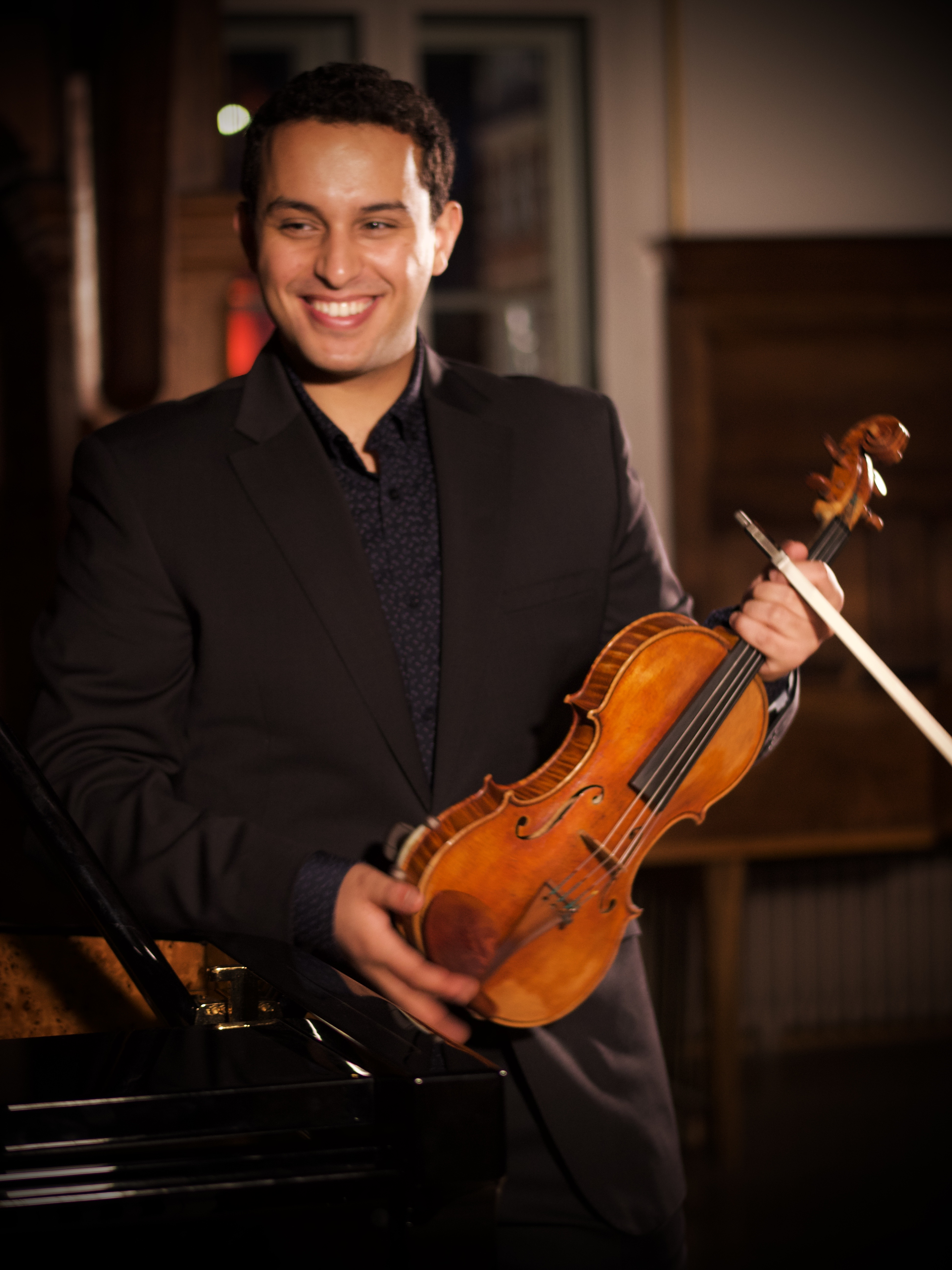
- Romdhani in London 2021

Background information
- Born: 3 December 1995 (age 30); Tunis, Tunisia
- Genres: Classical
- Occupations: Violinist, Performer, Artist, Musician
- Instruments: "Menuhin" 1998 violin by Andreas Hellinge in Geneva, Switzerland
- Years active: 2005-present
- Member of: Orchestre Philharmonique de Nice (2025-Present)
- Formerly of: Slovak State Philharmonic Košice / Štátna Filharmónia Košice (2022-2024)
- Website: bacemanasviolin.com

Bacem Anas Romdhani (Arabic: باسم أنس الرمضاني ; born 3 December 1995) is a Tunisian-British award-winning concert violinist. He was the winner of the World Philharmonic Orchestra International competition in Paris ("Five Children of the World", 2006), where he was scouted to represent Tunisia, Africa, and the Arab world; first prize winner at the Vatelot-Rampal International violin competition in Paris (2007); third prize winner at the Vienna New Year's Concert International music competition in Vienna (2021); and semi-finalist laureate at the Windsor Festival International string competition in the United Kingdom (2021). He performs on the 1998 "Menuhin" violin crafted by Andreas Hellinge in Geneva, Switzerland.

== Biography ==
Born in Tunis, Romdhani's career started in 2005 at the age of nine, when he was invited as a soloist to play with the Tunisian Symphony Orchestra. In 2006, he won the World Philharmonic Orchestra "Five Children of the World" International competition in Paris. He was scouted to represent Tunisia, Africa, and the Arab world. He flew to Paris to join the orchestra as concertmaster under the baton of world-renowned Japanese conductor Yutaka Sado. The event was held at Les Invalides and was attended by various celebrities. During this French tour, he also won first prize at the Vatelot-Rampal International violin competition.

He received a personal invite to the presidential castle by Zine El Abidine Ben Ali of Tunisia to be honoured for his successful musical journey in 2007.

His multi award-winning documentary, Kène ya ma kène... (or Once Upon Our Time; French: Un Conte de Faits) was released in 2010, which chronicles his journey from 2006 to 2010. It was screened at various film festivals and won first prize at the 20th Milan festival of African, Asian, and Latin American cinema, in March 2010, and first prize at the 30th Verona festival in November 2010.

He was the first African-Arab artist to reach the semi-final of the Windsor Festival International String Competition held in September 2021 in the United Kingdom. He won third prize at the Vienna New Year's Concert International Music Competition 2021 and first prize at the Vatelot-Rampal International violin competition (2007) in Paris.

== Early life and education ==
His first violin teachers were Rachid Koubaa and Sem Slimane, both former concertmasters of the Tunisian Symphony Orchestra.

In 2007 aged eleven, he auditioned for one of the world's most prestigious music schools, the Yehudi Menuhin School based in the United Kingdom. He won a place under a full scholarship for the duration of seven years. There he studied with Akiko Ono and ended up meeting his long-time mentor, world renowned pedagogue and performer Simon Fischer. Fischer's musical impact was so profound that he carried his studies with him by joining the Guildhall School of Music and Drama in September 2014. He graduated in July 2018 with a Bachelor of Music (Hons), along with a concert recital diploma awarded for exceptional performance in a specified assessment, at the end of the bachelor's degree.

In September 2018, He moved to the prestigious Royal College of Music to finish his Master of Performance with Polish professor Maciej Rakowski and later concluding his studies with Internationally renowned Romanian-born French professor Radu Blidar with an Artist Diploma in July 2022.

== Instrument ==
Bacem Anas performs on the "Yehudi Menuhin" fine violin made by Andreas Hellinge in Geneva, Switzerland, 1998.

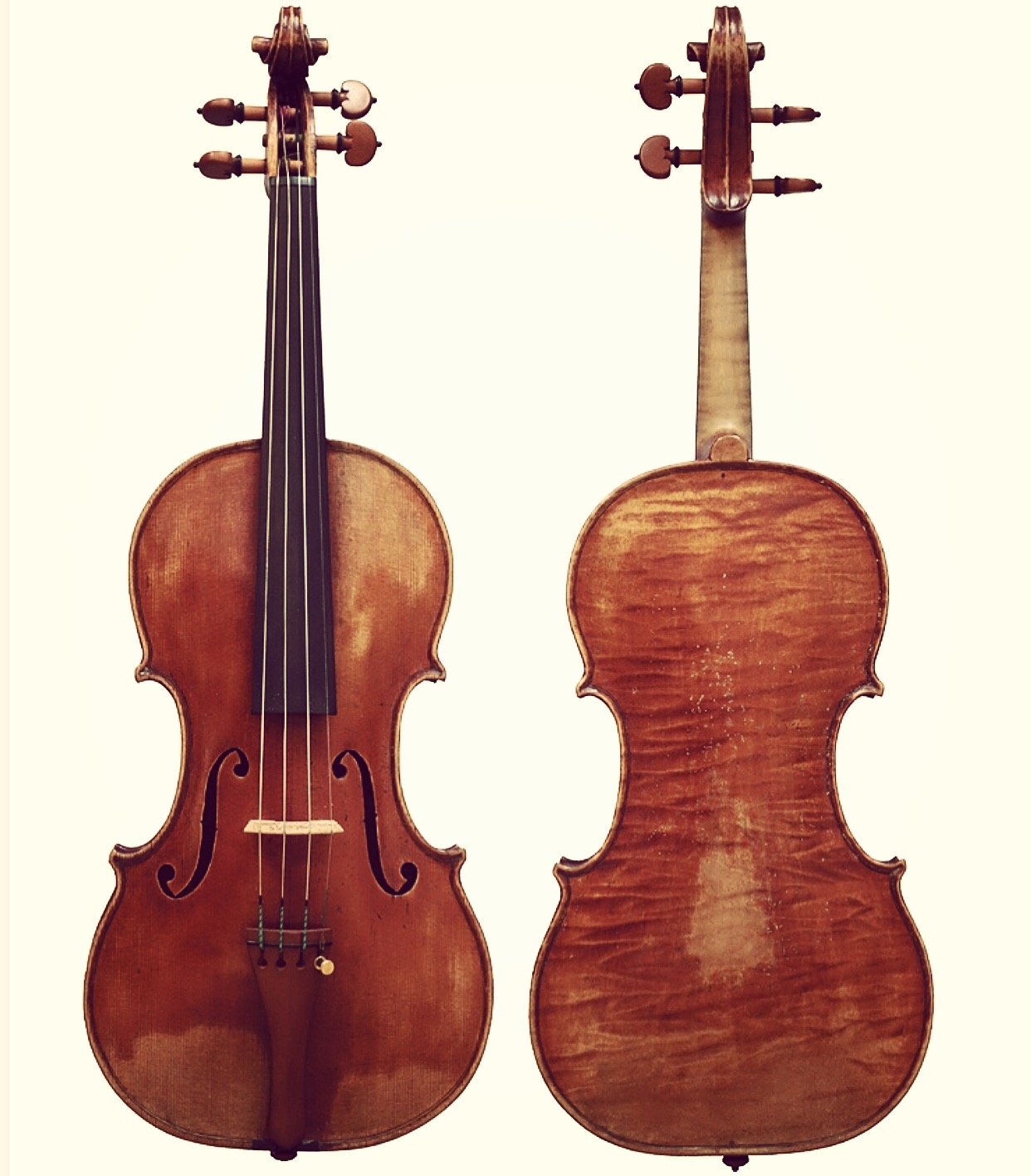
"Yehudi Menuhin" violin made by Andreas Hellinge, Geneva 1998

In 1998, Yehudi Menuhin consigned the 1742 'Lord Wilton' Del Gesu for sale with Hug & Co in Zurich. While it was for sale, the company invited the Swiss maker Andreas Hellinge to produce two 'bench copies' of the violin. This is one of those copes that was intended for presentation to Menuhin as a memento of the sale. It is arguably amongst the most important contemporary violins commissioned for Menuhin. The violin has superb playing qualities, and is both musically and technically one of the best modern del Gesu copies.

== Personal life ==
In 2007 aged eleven, Bacem Anas solely settled in the United Kingdom. He became a naturalised British citizen in April 2022. He lived in Košice, Slovakia, for two years (2022–2024) where he took on the role of associate principal second violin of the Slovak State Philharmonic Košice (Štátna Filharmonia Košice). In January 2025, he became a member of the Orchestre Philharmonique de Nice (a.k.a. L'Opéra Nice Côte d'Azur) and is currently resident in the Côte d’Azur, France.

He is fluent in Arabic, French, and English.

== Dedicated Piece of Music ==
In 2020, the famed Tunisian composer Ouanes Khligene wrote a piece for violin & piano specially for Bacem Anas Romdhani. The piece titled ‘Le Voyageur et La Rose’ (EN: The Traveller & The Rose) with a special story written by the famed Tunisian writer Hechmi Ghachem. A violin concerto for violin & orchestra was also composed for him before the composer's passing.

== Awards ==
- Third prize at Vienna New Year's Concert International Music Competition (Vienna, 2021)
- Semi-Final at Windsor Festival International String Competition (UK, 2021)
- Amsha Trust Award, (Switzerland, 2021)
- Community Jameel Hardship Fund, (Saudi Arabia, 2021)
- Community Jameel Hardship Fund (Saudi Arabia, 2020)
- Full Scholarship Award, Royal College of Music (London, 2020)
- Full Scholarship Award, Royal Academy of Music (London, 2020)
- Parikian Award (London, 2018)
- Full Scholarship Award, Royal College of Music (London, 2018)
- Rambourg Foundation Award (Tunisia, 2015)
- Full Scholarship Award, Guildhall School of Music and Drama (London, 2014)
- Solo Concert Artist in Residence, Tunisian Symphony Orchestra (Tunisia, 2014)
- Scholarship Award, Mawel Association, (Tunisia, 2008)
- Full Scholarship Award, Habib Bourguiba Foundation (Tunisia, 2007)
- Full Scholarship Award, The Yehudi Menuhin School (London, 2007)
- Honours award from the president of Tunisian republic (Tunisia, 2007)
- First prize Vatelot-Rampal International violin competition (Paris, 2007)
- Jean-Luc Lagardère Foundation Scholarship (Paris, 2006)
- World Philharmonic Orchestra 'Five Children of the World' grant (Paris, 2006)

== Recordings ==
- J. S. Bach: Violin Partita No. 3 in E major, BWV 1006: III.Gavotte en Rondeau, 2021
- J. S. Bach: Violin Sonata No.1 in G minor, BWV 1001: I.Adagio (live), 2021
- Fritz Kreisler: Liebesleid, 2022
- Franz Schubert: Serenade, 2022
- Sergei Rachmaninoff: Vocalise, 2022

== Documentary ==
The 2010 film Kène ya ma kène... (Once Upon Our Time) by Hichem Ben Ammar documents Romdhani's journey. In a popular neighborhood of Tunis, a trombonist dreams of his son, Bacem Anas Romdhani, becoming a great musician. The son makes his father's dream his own, and develops extraordinary aptitudes with the violin. After winning several international competitions, he is offered the chance to enroll in one of the world's most prestigious music schools for young kids the Yehudi Menuhin School in the United Kingdom. The film shows Bacem Anas' journey, the obstacles he faces on the way, and his evolution while in Europe from 2006 to 2010.
