= Richard Kogan (physician) =

American psychiatry professor, pianist

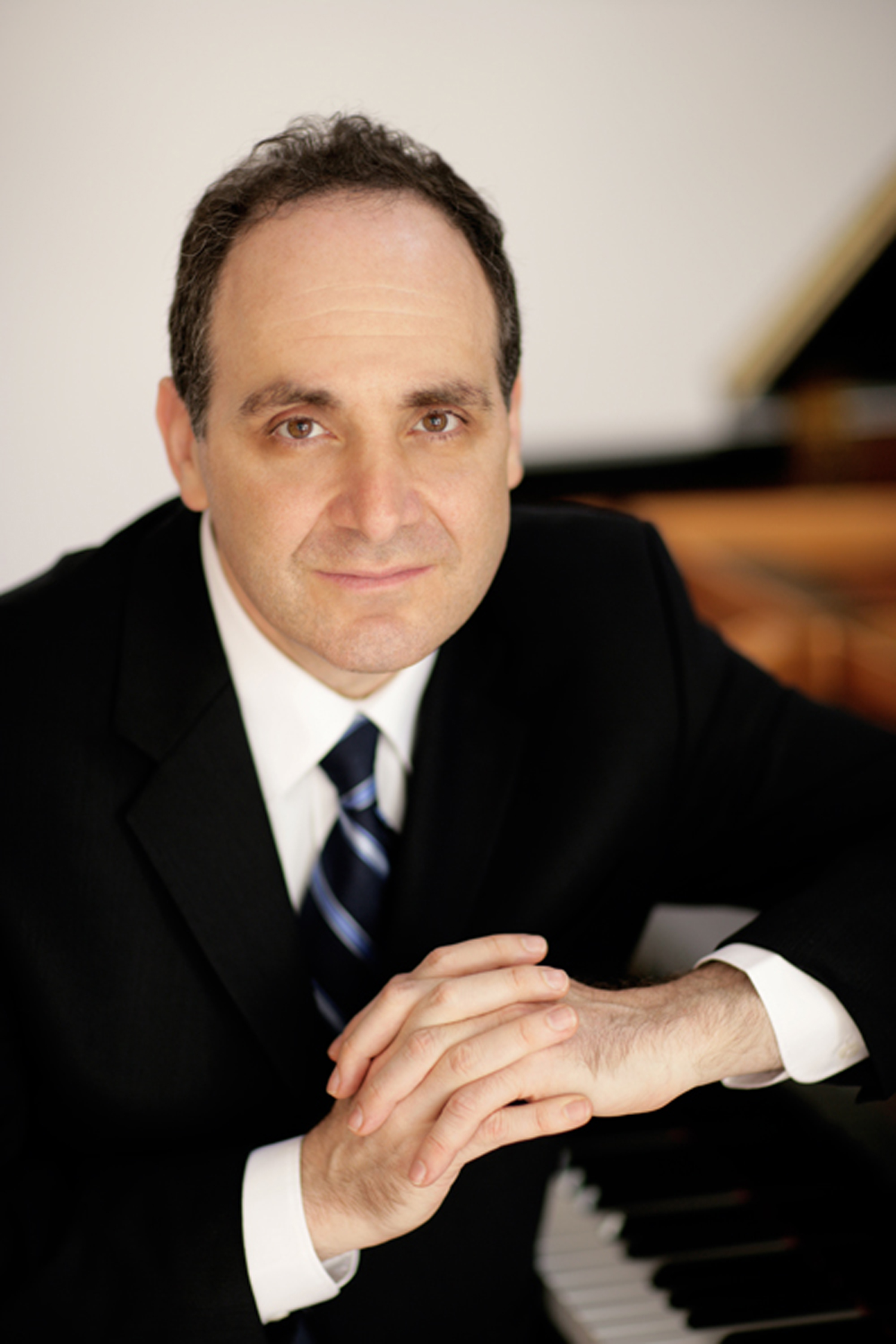
- Born: 1955 (age 70–71)
- Education: Music degree, Harvard University; and M.D. degree, Harvard Medical School
- Occupations: Psychiatry professor, pianist

Richard Kogan is Clinical Professor of Psychiatry at Weill Cornell Medical Center in New York City; Co-Director of the Medical Center's Human Sexuality Program; and Artistic Director of the Weill Cornell Music and Medicine Program.

Kogan is a concert pianist. He developed a series of lecture-recitals that explore the role of music in healing and the influence of psychological factors and medical conditions on the creative work of composers.

== Life ==
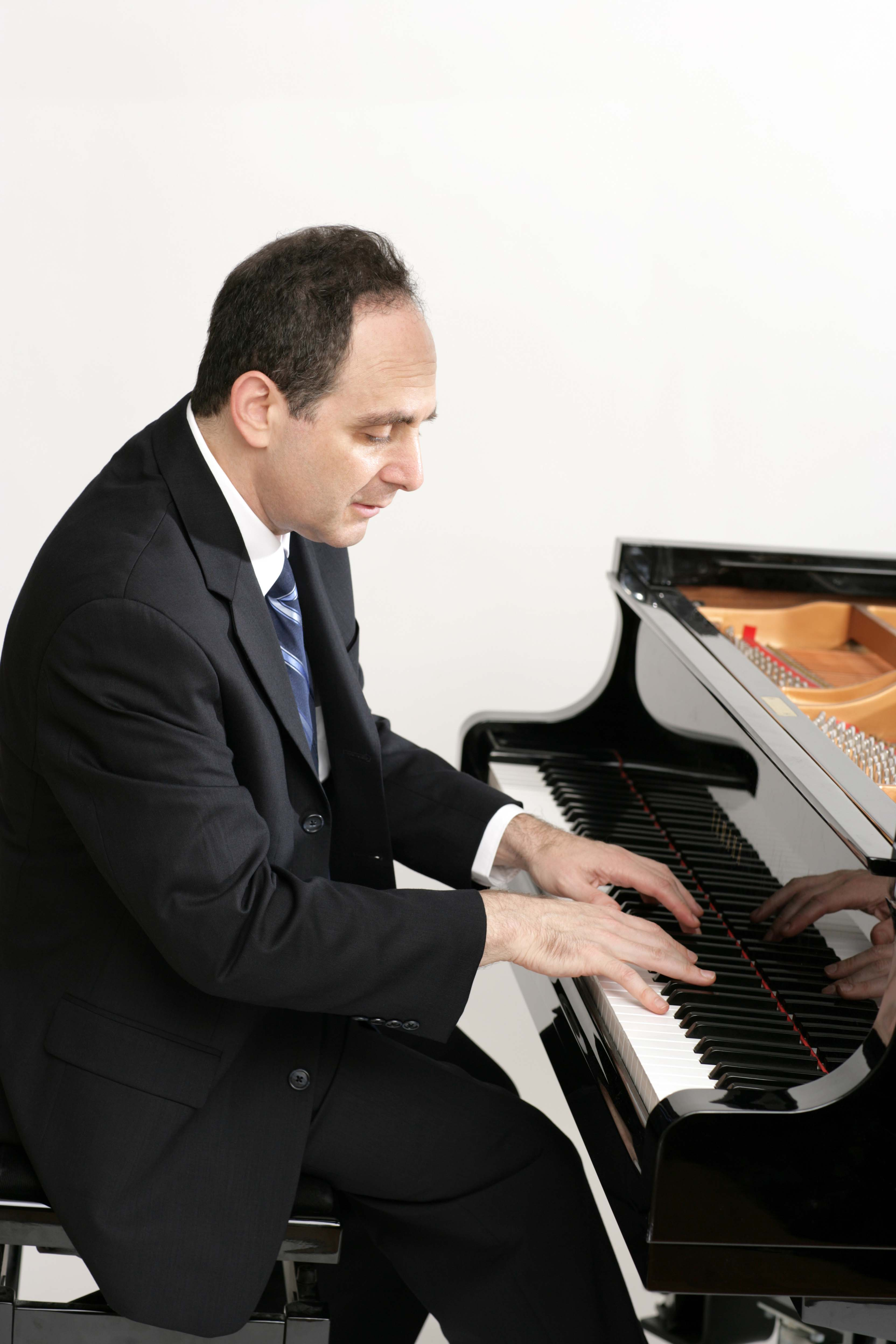
Richard Kogan

Kogan is the son of a gastroenterologist from Elizabeth, New Jersey, and the second of five children. He began piano performances in 1961 at age 6. But the medical world was never far from family life; his father took the boy on medical rounds. His mother enrolled him at the Juilliard School of Music pre-college, where he studied piano with Nadia Reisenberg.

At Harvard University, where he majored in music and completed a pre-medical curriculum, Kogan formed a trio with his Juilliard friend Yo-Yo Ma and violinist Lynn Chang. After earning a bachelor's degree in 1977, he went to Harvard Medical School under a special five-year plan that enabled him to travel and perform concerts.

Kogan received his M.D. degree from Harvard Medical School in 1982. He completed a psychiatry residency and an academic fellowship at New York University.

In 2001 Kogan presented a symposium at the American Psychiatric Association on mental illness and musical creativity. The experience launched him on a new career. It convinced him that exploring composers' psyches made him a better interpreter of their scores, and that understanding the role of creativity in people's lives made him a better psychiatrist.

Kogan's role as artistic director of the Weill Cornell Music and Medicine Program has allowed him to enable medical students and physicians to pursue, as he has, both medicine and music without leaving either behind.

== Music ==
For his lecture-concerts, Kogan selects composers who had intrapsychic conflicts that affected their creative processes, and who wrote for the piano, so that he can illustrate his points with musical examples.

He often uses an anniversary as an occasion to examine a certain composer. In 2006 he explored Mozart's mind and music at the 250th anniversary of his birth. In 2007 he discussed Leonard Bernstein on the 50th anniversary of the world premiere of West Side Story. In 2010 he discussed Chopin on the bicentennial of his birth.

Asked whether it is possible to diagnose psychiatric conditions in deceased composers, Kogan said:

People often say you can't really diagnose anybody you have not had face-to-face interviews with because it is conjecture at best. But Tchaikovsky was a prolific letter writer; he wrote 1,400 letters to his patron, and they were very intimate letters. He clearly had a major depressive disorder; Schumann was clearly bipolar. Beethoven was interesting; I have had trouble getting a good fix on his diagnosis. He had substantial psychological issues with tempestuous mood swings. He was unquestionably depressed. He had suicidal thoughts, though he never made a suicide attempt. And he had clear, overt, psychotic behavior, especially at the end of his life. It is difficult to factor in how much his irregular behavior and eccentricities were influenced or exacerbated by his progressive hearing loss. When I talk to audiences about this, people often come up and say, "I have heard this piece a million times, but I have never heard it that way." I don't think they are talking about the uniqueness of my interpretation. I think they are talking about their understanding of the psychological and historical forces that went into making that piece.

Kogan has said that many famous composers have had mental problems that seem to have both enriched and complicated their music, and certainly complicated their lives. Prominent among them are:

Ludwig van Beethoven (1770–1827): His hearing loss and syphilis may have induced psychosis.

Frédéric Chopin (1810–49): In self-imposed exile from his beloved occupied Poland; evidently experiencing tuberculosis that caused enervation, exhaustion, and a constant awareness of the shadow of death; and bedeviled by visual hallucinations (possibly produced by temporal lobe epilepsy), Chopin, according to Kogan, "not coinciden[tally] composed the most famous funeral march in history."

Robert Schumann (1810–56): Manic episodes in the course of his bipolar disorder brought periods of explosive creativity, but he died in a mental institution of self-starvation.

Peter Ilich Tchaikovsky (1840–93): As a closeted homosexual in czarist Russia, he was deeply depressed for many years and may have ended his life by suicide.

Scott Joplin (1867 or 1868 – 1917): the "King of Ragtime", born in the first generation of freeborn African-Americans after the Civil War. "When you listen to classic ragtime pieces and note the basic tension between the metrically rigid baselines and the captivating, syncopated melodic lines, you can almost hear it as the struggle and eventual triumph of freedom over slavery." By 1916, Joplin had tertiary syphilis and resulting insanity; In January 1917 he was admitted to a mental institution, where he soon died of syphilitic dementia at 49.

George Gershwin (1898–1937) as a child would probably today have been diagnosed with conduct disorder and attention-deficit hyperactivity disorder. Late in his life, psychoanalysis could not relieve depression triggered by an undiagnosed brain tumor, which killed him at 38.

Some other composers' lives, though also marked by periods of mental illness, did not end quite so tragically. Sergei Rachmaninoff (1873–1943), following the disastrous premiere of his Symphony No. 1, experienced severe depression for three years that prevented him from composing. After his psychiatrist, Nikolai Dahl (an amateur musician), cured Rachmaninoff's creative block through hypnosis and psychotherapy, the composer produced his celebrated Piano Concerto No. 2, dedicated to Dahl.

Kogan has said that, while writers and artists have mood disorders in greater proportion than the general population, mental illness is not a prerequisite for creativity. "There have been examples of great composers, such as Bach, Haydn, and Mendelssohn, who seem to have been relatively free of significant psychopathology."

Kogan, the director of a human-sexuality program, sees links between music and human sexuality:

There's a common vocabulary between the two: fantasy, rhythm, harmony, climax... Masters and Johnson tried to define the phases of sexuality with scientific rigor—stages of desire, arousal, climax, and resolution. Many very great pieces of music follow the same arc. Music can get everybody in the room to feel the same way at the same time, and everyone will agree on the climax of the piece. Great composers don't give you immediate gratification; they set up an expectation and then veer you away somewhere else, so when you finally get a release, the resolution is more powerful and more satisfying. There may be a basic mechanism that is common to all pleasure.

While trained as a classical musician, Kogan has said he has "a deep appreciation for a wide variety of musical genres.... I am generally opposed to arbitrary stylistic distinctions. I agree with the viewpoint of Duke Ellington, who once said, 'There are only two kinds of music—good music and bad music. I like both kinds.'"

Kogan has said that he has had at least a dozen favorite composers, including Bach, Mozart, Beethoven, Schubert, Chopin, Brahms, Debussy, Stravinsky, Bartók, and Shostakovich. "My favorite composer seems to be the one whose musical world I've been immersed in most deeply at any given time."

== Resilience ==
Psychological resilience is the ability to recover from traumatic events to such a degree that one's life returns to its pre-traumatic level of functioning. In Kogan’s view, music can foster the development of resilience.

=== Beethoven ===
According to Kogan, Ludwig van Beethoven is an extraordinary example of resilience. When he discovered that he was going deaf, he considered suicide, but decided against it and "actually became a much greater composer after he became deaf.... he wasn't hearing the music written by his contemporaries like Haydn, with whom he had studied as a young man, so he was less under the influence of prevailing traditions, and he began to... conjure up sounds and forms that were different from anything anyone had composed".

Beethoven had experienced trauma early in life. His alcoholic father, as a music teacher, was brutal to him. Whenever Beethoven did not follow his instructions precisely, he would either threaten to beat him or actually do so. "And nothing infuriated his father more than when Beethoven would improvise, which the father considered to be an unacceptable act of rebellion." The desperately unhappy boy retreated into a world of music and fantasy: he practiced prodigiously, especially when his father was not around, and daydreamed that his father was not his actual father—that he was in fact the illegitimate son of King Friedrich Wilhelm II of Prussia.

Isolated as a child, Beethoven became considerably more isolated when he went deaf. In some ways, the deafness worked to his advantage. Before he had been forced to give up public performances as one of the leading pianists of the age, he had been terribly frustrated by the pianos of his time, which were tiny instruments with very little resonance. Once he retreated into his silent world, he conjured up the sounds of the modern grand piano. His Appassionata Sonata was never performed in his lifetime. "[I]t makes no sense on pianos of his era", Kogan has said. "[In] the Sonata, you hear him channeling his rage; but the sound of the modern grand piano seemed to be almost essential to the expression of what he was trying to [convey].... Occasionally some 'authentic' person will try to [play it on a piano of his day], but it sounds really odd."

In the middle period of his life, Beethoven composed very dramatic music, full of heroism and nobility. Toward the end of his life—when he was completely deaf and almost completely isolated—"his music-making became much more intimate, lyrical, expressive. You get the feeling that the music that he was creating was his own way of connecting with the outside world, was a way of establishing some kind of intimacy that was otherwise lacking in his life. [I]n the piano sonatas that he wrote [toward the end of his life] he bares his soul... He's not expressing the kind of heaven-storming rage he expressed in the Appassionata. [Now] he is disclosing a lifetime of suffering, but it's tempered, I believe, by wisdom."

At the end of his life, Beethoven had a host of chronic illnesses, including cirrhosis of the liver, chronic renal failure, pancreatitis, and severe abdominal pain. But according to Kogan, this man, who desperately needed healing himself, "was trying to heal the world.... I'm not sure that there's been any piece of music... that's healed more worldwide trauma than the finale of Beethoven's Ninth Symphony... the Ode to Joy".

=== Chopin ===
Another example of resilience Kogan cites is Frédéric Chopin, who lived out the entire, brief second half of his life in France, in self-imposed exile from his beloved Poland. The Russian Empire's suppression of Poland's November 1830 Uprising had thrown him into such despair that, in a notebook, he wondered how God, if He existed and was not Himself a Russian, could permit such a calamity. Chopin also poured his distress into compositions such as the Revolutionary Étude, which combines a sense of palpable loss with a sense of unvanquishable resistance. In that piece, 20-year-old Chopin showed his resilience by converting his anguish into inner healing through the truest expression of his feelings.

Amid the pain of exile from his beloved family and homeland, Chopin continued composing piano works in many genres, including pieces modeled on a Polish folk dance, the mazurka (named for Poland's Mazovia, Mazowsze, region), and on the stately aristocratic processional dance, the polonaise (named for Poland). He wrote them as a way of demonstrating the continuing vitality of a Poland that did not exist as a sovereign polity. With his more refined piano versions of uniquely Polish music, he made the world aware of his homeland's musical heritage while extending the reach of those forms.

In addition to separation from homeland and family through his entire adult life, Chopin's severe medical conditions—evidently including tuberculosis as well as disturbing visual hallucinations (possibly produced by temporal lobe epilepsy)—caused enervation, exhaustion, and the constant shadow of imminent death. "It was probably not a coincidence", Kogan says, "that this man who was deathly ill for much of his short life composed the most famous funeral march in history."

Kogan describes Chopin's indomitable resilience—his ability to "spring back", an ability that Kogan says can be used to meet daunting challenges in the life of any person, whatever his degree of talent. "Resilience is a skill", he says; "you can practice it. Chopin exhibited many of its components, including discipline. Despite his horrible health, energy fluctuations, and weakness, he maintained a very disciplined work schedule, composing, teaching five hours a day, and practicing." Kogan sees special potential for psychic and physical healing in music and in musical training.

=== Rachmaninoff ===
When Sergei Rachmaninoff was nine years old, living with his family in St. Petersburg, Russia, the boy and his older sister came down with diphtheria. She died; and while he survived, the traumatic experience left him with a lifelong fear of death.

At age 12, Rachmaninoff was sent to Moscow to attend a piano-education program. The program improved his piano skills but deepened his depression. But he found that writing music enabled him to express his emotions. At the Moscow Conservatory, his abilities were recognized by his idol, Pyotr Ilyich Tchaikovsky. After Tchaikovsky's death in 1893, Rachmaninoff, who was determined to live up to Tchaikovsky's expectations of him, began writing his Symphony No. 1.

Its premiere received bad reviews. The orchestra had not rehearsed adequately, and the conductor, Alexander Glazunov, had apparently been drunk during the performance. Rachmaninoff was plunged into a major depression and lost his ability to compose. Finally, in desperation, he consulted a psychiatrist, Nikolai Dahl, who had cured Rachmaninoff’s aunt of a psychosomatic condition.

Himself an accomplished amateur violist, Dahl seems to have used cognitive therapy to suppress the negative thoughts that hindered Rachmaninoff’s musical creativity. At each session he also put the composer into a hypnotic trance and repeated the same encouraging posthypnotic suggestions. Dahl and his patient met daily beginning in January 1900, and by that April Rachmaninoff’s mood, sleep, and appetite had markedly improved. He began work on one of the great works of classical music, his Piano Concerto No. 2, which he gratefully dedicated to Dahl. Kogan discerns another tribute to Dahl in the third movement's notable melody introduced by the violas: "I don't think it is a coincidence that Dr. Dahl's instrument was the viola." "Rachmaninoff's Second Piano Concerto ... is the most popular piano concerto ever written ... that was dedicated to a psychiatrist."

After the Russian Revolution of 1917 Rachmaninoff and his family left Russia, eventually settling in New York City, where he became extremely successful as a concert pianist. Nevertheless, he remained tormented by depression, and his preoccupation with death only grew with age. He made creative use of this preoccupation by including the Dies irae motif in at least 20 of his works.

He also developed phobias involving strangers, darkness, and small animals. He openly acknowledged his mental ailments. He also developed physical ailments that prompted his internist to advise him to cut back on his concertizing. Rachmaninoff refused: "This is my only joy, the concerts…. If I have a pain, it stops when I am playing…. No, I cannot play less… It is best to die on the concert stage."

=== Gershwin ===
A more recent example of an especially resilient composer Kogan cites is George Gershwin. "Part of what's fascinating about Gershwin is that he grew up in a home almost completely without music." He and his siblings spent a lot of their time roaming the streets. "George stole food from pushcarts, regularly engaged in fistfights, even set fires on occasion. He lost his virginity with a girl at age nine. He was a hyperactive kid who showed signs of conduct disorder."

But at age 10 or 11, while playing hooky from school classes, Gershwin overheard a violin recital by a fellow pupil. "On the spot", Kogan says, "he decided that was what he was going to do with the rest of his life."

"Gershwin might have fit a diagnosis of ADHD", Kogan says. "Today a child psychiatrist might have prescribed Adderall or Ritalin, but in Gershwin's case his behavioral problems stopped when he found music."

Gershwin persuaded his parents to let him take piano lessons. He poured all his considerable energy into a musical education that covered classics by Mozart, Schumann, and Beethoven, but he also "inhaled all of Broadway tunes and jazz." Kogan says, "He used to say that 'Studying the piano turned a bad boy into a good boy.'"

At 15 Gershwin dropped out of school and went to a Tin Pan Alley publishing company to promote other people's songs. By 20, he had his own breakout hit with Swanee, recorded by Al Jolson, who had overheard Gershwin performing it at a party.

Kogan points to a train ride that Gershwin and his lyricist brother Ira took when the composer was 25. They were traveling from New York to Boston for the tryout of a musical called Sweet Little Devil. "On the way, George said he paid close attention to the clickety-clack of the train on the tracks and the whooshing sounds of the train in motion. Later, he claimed that the entire construction of Rhapsody in Blue revealed itself to him during that ride." The piece combines elements of classical music and jazz and was finished in a mere three weeks.

"He was stimulated by what others might consider noise", Kogan says. This was also true of the Paris taxi horns that influenced An American in Paris. "Some composers insist on absolute quiet, but Gershwin composed with the window open."

The hyperactivity that characterized him as a youngster persisted for the rest of his life. You can hear it in his music. This, for example, from Rhapsody in Blue. [Kogan plays a fast-tempo passage on the piano.] Tell me: could that have been written by somebody who was not hyperactive? Do you know this song? [Kogan plays a passage from Someone to Watch over Me.] When Gershwin would play this song, it would sound something more like this. [Kogan plays the same passage at a speeded-up tempo.] People asked him, "Why do you play everything that way?" He answered: "We live in an age of staccato [clipped, abrupt, detached playing], not legato [smooth and connected playing]." This was the Jazz Age, it was the Roaring Twenties. But I think Gershwin lived in a central nervous system of staccato and not of legato. The adult Gershwin would not have received an ADHD diagnosis [from a 21st-century psychiatrist]. As a grown-up, he had an excellent attention span; he was no longer prone to impulsive behavior. And, unlike so many conduct-disordered children, he didn't have any antisocial or sociopathic tendencies as an adult. George Gershwin's life was completely transformed by his exposure to music as a youngster. Music didn't just cure him; it made him better than well by unlocking the creative genius within.

At 38 Gershwin died of a brain tumor. Physicians had missed the signs of the tumor, which was not diagnosed until the day he died. He had gone to a hospital, complaining of headaches, and lapsed into a coma. Later a glioblastoma was found on his temporal lobe. He had been showing symptoms: he interrupted rehearsals, complaining about smelling burning garbage, and had trouble with his coordination. But people may have missed the signs because he never stopped working; he wrote music until the last week of his life.

== Destigmatization ==
When asked by psychiatrist Lloyd I. Sederer about other concerns of his, Kogan said that he is trying to destigmatize mental disorders: if geniuses can have a mental illness, then mental illness should not be thought shameful, especially if a mental disorder is part of the creative and inspirational process. Kogan has done numerous benefit concerts for organizations such as the National Alliance on Mental Illness (NAMI).

There is some epidemiologic evidence that the incidence of psychiatric illness, particularly mood disorders, is greater in populations of writers, poets, artists, musicians than in the general population. Throughout history, there have been examples of creative geniuses who grappled with psychiatric illness: Robert Schumann, Tchaikovsky, Beethoven, Michelangelo, van Gogh, Tolstoy, Hemingway, Virginia Woolf, Sylvia Plath. These examples can be beneficial for psychiatrists who are looking to eradicate the stigma associated with mental illness. Because it seems rather perverse to stigmatize a group whose members include some individuals who have made such immense contributions to civilization.

== Mind and body ==
In psychiatry, the overarching paradigm is the biopsychosocial model. This model holds that mind, centered in the brain, is an integral part of the body, and that both mind and body also interact with the social milieu. Each of the three factors—biology, psyche, and society—interacts with and affects the others.

Kogan says that listening to, or playing, music reduces stress levels by releasing the hormone cortisol, and can reduce pain.

Music boosts immunity and releases dopamine, a brain neurotransmitter also released during other pleasurable activities such as sex or eating good food.

Music benefits heart patients by reducing high blood pressure; in stroke patients, it helps restore speech and motor functions; and in the elderly it helps arrest cognitive decline. Music can enhance the motor functioning of people with Parkinson's disease.

"Music needs to be part of the healing techniques adopted by a psychiatrist", Kogan says. "It should not replace traditional medicine, rather supplement it. We need to make it a part of traditional therapy, as it makes the recovery faster."

Kogan recommends that his patients not just listen to music, but make it themselves.

"I especially recommend community listening or playing, where the entire group is enjoying rather than merely tuning in to iPods and other gadgets."

== Recordings ==
- Music and the Mind: The Life and Works of Robert Schumann (DVD), Yamaha Touchstar Productions, 2004.

== Honors ==
- Concert Artists Guild Award
- Kosciuszko Foundation Chopin Competition
- Liebert Award for Applied Psychoanalysis
- McGovern Award for the Art and Science of Medicine
- American College of Psychiatry Public Service Award
- Eighth annual Joan and Stanford Alexander Award in Psychiatry, presented to Kogan at Baylor College of Medicine, April 6, 2016.
