= Yuki Ito (cellist) =

Japanese cellist

Yuki Ito 伊藤 悠貴
- Genres: Classical
- Occupation: Cellist
- Website: Japan Arts Artist Page

Yuki Ito (伊藤 悠貴, Itō Yūki) is a Japanese classical cellist, based in London and Tokyo. He is particularly noted for his interpretations of Sergei Rachmaninoff's works, in particular the Cello Sonata. In 2025 he became the first Japanese cellist to join the international roster of Larsen Strings Artist.

== Biography ==
His debut album, Sergei Rachmaninoff : Complete Cello Works, with pianist Sofya Gulyak released in 2012 October, was selected as The Strad magazine's "Recommended Disc and in 2023 he published his first book: a monograph "Insights on Rachmaninoff -from the Cellist’s perspective-" commemorating the composer's 150th birth anniversary. In the book he revealed a secret story of the Cello Sonata told by Rachmaninoff himself to his friend Anatoliy Brandukov, which have never been uncovered before.

Yuki Ito made his debut with the Philharmonia Orchestra at Windsor Castle in England in 2011. Praised by The Strad as "sensational" and for his "commanding technique and masterfully assured delivery of melody", he has performed around the globe making a multifaceted career, from an "All Rachmaninoff Recital" at Wigmore Hall in London (given for the first time in its history by a cellist) to the world-premiere of Johan de Meij’s Cello Concerto "Casanova" (orchestral version) at Suntory Hall with the Tokyo Philharmonic Orchestra under the baton of the composer himself.

His agency announced his Carnegie Hall recital debut in Spring 2027.

He has been invited to give masterclass by conservatoires such as Academy of Music (Ljubljana) in Slovenia, and in 2025 he served as the youngest chairman of the jury at International Music Competition "FLAME" in Paris.

Yuki Ito was awarded the "Hideo Saito Memorial Award" in 2019 (given by Seiji Ozawa and Tsuyoshi Tsutsumi), one of the most honourable music awards in Japan, for his service to music. In 2026 he received the prestigious Hotel Okura Music Award.

In 2025 he became the first Japanese cellist to join the international roster of Larsen Strings Artist. Other artists on the roster include David Geringas, Jean-Guihen Queyras, Daniel Müller-Schott, Sol Gabetta, Gautier Capuçon, and Julia Fischer.

He plays the "Maragarites" cello by Paolo Antonio Testore (Milan, c.1755).

== Rachmaninoff Cello Sonata ==
After the failure of the premiere of his Symphony No. 1 (Op. 13) in March 1897, Rachmaninoff continued to compose some short pieces for piano, song and choral work while appearing in a number of concerts as an opera conductor. Just as he was finally beginning to recover from his ordeal, in January 1900, he had the opportunity to meet with the great Lev Tolstoy. However, he once again lost confidence after receiving harsh criticism for his original song "Fate" (Op. 21-1). After an unsuccessful meeting with Tolstoy meant to revoke his writer's block, relatives decided to introduce Rachmaninoff to the neurologist Nikolai Dahl, to which Rachmaninoff agreed without resistance. Between January and April 1900, Rachmaninoff underwent hypnotherapy and supportive therapy sessions with Dahl on a daily basis for over 3 months, specifically structured to improve his sleep patterns, mood, and appetite and reignite his desire to compose. That summer, Rachmaninoff felt that "new musical ideas began to stir" and successfully resumed composition.

In July 1900, Rachmaninoff finally composed the "Love Duet," a key scene in the opera Francesca da Rimini, which was to be completed in 1906. This song was written earlier than his Piano Concerto No.2, which he began composing in the autumn of 1900, and the "Love Duet" became an important work that marked Rachmaninoff's rebirth as a composer. In particular, there are natural similarities in their lyricism between the three works composed around the same time: Suite No. 2 for Two Pianos (Op. 17), Piano Concerto No. 2 (Op. 18), and the Cello Sonata (Op. 19).

The opening of the first movement of the Cello Sonata alludes to Rachmaninoff's "signature" Gregorian chant, "Dies irae," and the first two cello notes imply the hidden word "Warum?" (German for "Why?"). The latter was revealed in the monograph “Insights on Rachmaninoff -from the Cellist’s perspective-” commemorating the composer’s 150th birth anniversary, written by cellist and Rachmaninoff researcher Yuki Ito. This "Warum?" motif appears frequently in the sonata in different forms. Throughout the work, there are references to the bells of Russian Orthodox churches (carillons) and homages to Rachmaninoff's Symphony No.1, which he held dear for his entire life, making this sonata a masterpiece that displays Rachmaninoff's distinctive characteristics.

== Discography ==
- Sergei Rachmaninoff : Complete Cello Works (2012 / Champs Hill Records CHRCD-044)
- The Romantic (Anthology) (2017 / Sony Music MECO-1045)
- Yuki Ito / Kazuhiro Gambe : Complete Songs (2020 / Diskart DACD-201)
- Adagio : Ensemble of loneliness (Multi-track recording) (2021 / King Record KICC-1587)
- Casanova : Complete works by Johan de Meij for Cello, Harp and Orchestra (2024 / AMSTEL CLASSICS CD 2024-01)

== Bibliography ==
- Ito, Yuki (2023). Insights on Rachmaninoff -from the Cellist’s perspective- (in Japanese). Tokyo: Keigado Publishing. ISBN 978-4-87430-052-7.

== Conducting ==
- Artistic Director/Principal Conductor of Knightsbridge Philharmonic Orchestra since 2013

== Prizes ==
- 2000: Overall winner, Sapporo Junior Cello Competition
- 2001: Gold medal, Osaka Junior Cello Competition (3rd Category – 13&under)
- 2003: Gold medal, Osaka Junior Cello Competition (2nd Category – 17&under)
- 2003: 1st prize, Japan Performer Competition
- 2006: 1st prize, 6th Antonio Janigro International Cello Competition
- 2007: Pierre Fournier Educational Award
- 2007: 1st prize, Marlow International Music Competition
- 2008: 2nd prize & Audience prize, 77th Music Competition of Japan
- 2009: 1st prize, 20th Paris FLAME International Music Competition
- 2010: 1st prize, 17th International Johannes Brahms Competition
- 2011: 1st prize, 3rd Windsor Festival International String Competition
- 2012: 1st prize, 14th Young Concert Artists European Audition / Special prize, 53rd Young Concert Artists New York Audition
- 2019: The 17th Hideo Saito Memorial Award, given by Seiji Ozawa and Tsuyoshi Tsutsumi
- 2026: The 26th Hotel Okura Music Award

== See also ==
- List of cellists

== Books ==
- Ito, Yuki (2023). Insights on Rachmaninoff -from the Cellist’s perspective- (in Japanese). Tokyo: Keigado Publishing. ISBN 978-4-87430-052-7.
- Bertensson, Sergei; Leyda, Jay (1956). Sergei Rachmaninoff – A Lifetime in Music. New York: New York University Press. ISBN 978-0-814-70044-0.
- Rachmaninoff, Sergei; von Riesemann, Oskar (1970) [1934]. Rachmaninoff's Recollections, Told to Oskar Von Riesemann. Freeport, New York: Books for Libraries Press. ISBN 978-0-8369-5232-2.
- Martyn, Barrie (1990). Rachmaninoff: Composer, Pianist, Conductor. Aldershot: Scolar Press. ISBN 978-0-859-67809-4.
- Harrison, Max (2006). Rachmaninoff: Life, Works, Recordings. London: Bloomsbury Publishing. ISBN 978-0-826-49312-5.
