= Joseph Alfidi =

American pianist, composer, conductor (1949–2015)

- Born: May 28, 1949; Yonkers, New York, U.S.
- Died: February 2, 2015 (aged 65)
- Occupations: Pianist, composer, conductor

Joseph Alfidi (May 28, 1949 – February 2, 2015) was an American pianist, composer, and conductor and initially a child prodigy. He was born in Yonkers, New York, as the son of American-born parents of Italian descent. His father, Frank Alfidi, was an accordion player who ran a music school in Yonkers. Known as "Joey" in his childhood, he was three when he started to play several instruments in his father's studio. By the age of four, he frequently improvised little compositions at the piano, and soon became fascinated by symphonic music as well.

== Biography ==
At the age of six, he had professional engagements to conduct the Miami Symphony Orchestra in Florida and members of the New York Philharmonic on Long Island.

On November 18, 1956, the seven-year-old appeared in Carnegie Hall, conducting the Symphony of the Air. The ambitious program included two overtures, Mozart's The Marriage of Figaro and Rossini's William Tell, as well as Haydn's "Surprise" Symphony and Beethoven's 5th Symphony.

He appeared on two CBS television network Goodson-Todman produced game-shows. On November 14, 1956, he was a guest on I've Got a Secret starring Garry Moore where he performed on four different instruments. On November 17, 1957, at the age of eight, he was a guest on the panel show What's My Line?.

Further appearances in New York with the Symphony of the Air followed in 1957, 1958, and 1960, and Joey conducted in many other American cities and toured Europe. He attended rehearsals and concerts led by Leopold Stokowski, Guido Cantelli, Pierre Monteux, Sir Thomas Beecham, and Leonard Bernstein.

He was invited to the Vatican where he performed for Pope John XXIII, who said the boy might turn out to be "another Mozart".

Joey continued to perform as a piano virtuoso and to write symphonic compositions, chamber music, and piano works as he mastered conducting. In late November 1960, the 11-year-old appeared with the Antwerp Philharmonic and was hailed as "the greatest child prodigy since Mozart". On December 1, 1960, he gave a royal command performance at the Palais des Beaux-Arts in Brussels before the Dowager Queen Elisabeth of Belgium, appearing in his multiple roles as pianist, conductor, and composer.

The live recording of this concert, released as a 2-LP set called Command Performance, contains his own Piano Concerto No. 2, Beethoven's Symphony No 8, Beethoven's 3rd Piano Concerto, Chopin's Etude Op. 25, No. 12, and Rachmaninoff's Prelude in C-sharp minor.

He accepted an invitation from Queen Elisabeth to study at the Brussels Conservatory, where his teachers included Eduardo del Pueyo and Jean Absil. In 1965, he received his Diplôme Supérieur for the piano and joined the Chapelle Musicale Reine Elisabeth for a three-year term of study.

In 1972, Alfidi entered the prestigious Queen Elisabeth Competition in Brussels and won 3rd prize in a tightly contested field, placing ahead of the Polish-American Emanuel Ax and Frenchman Cyprien Katsaris, highly celebrated pianists in their own right. The following year, he took First Prize at the 1973 Concours Complet International in Ourense, Spain.

Several of Alfidi's performances from the 1972 Queen Elisabeth Competition were issued on LP, including his live Rachmaninov 3rd Concerto from the final round with the Belgian National Orchestra (on the Deutsche Grammophon label), and various solo and duo pieces including works of Samuel Barber; Frédéric Chopin (Ballade No. 1, Barcarolle, Scherzo Nos 2 and 4); Beethoven (Moonlight, Pathétique, Appassionata Sonatas); Rachmaninoff's Piano Suites Nos 1 and 2 and Symphonic Dances, Op. 45, Rachmaninoff's Isle of the Dead, Op. 29 (in an arrangement for two pianos), as well as Gershwin's Concerto for piano and orchestra in F – all with the Flanders Philharmonic conducted by Theodor Bloomfield.

He made a number of studio recordings for EMI Belgium including the Leduc Piano Concerto, Brahms' Piano Sonata No. 3 in F minor and another album with Schumann's Kinderszenen, Alfidi's 2 Etudes, Franck's Prelude Chorale and Fugue, and pieces by Rachmaninov.

Arthur Rubinstein heard Alfidi's LP recording of the Rachmaninov 3rd Concerto and was very impressed by it. In 1979, the French film maker François Reichenbach produced for Televisa-Mexico a series of documentaries, including one entitled Arthur Rubinstein and the Young – Joe Alfidi & Arthur Rubinstein in which Alfidi is invited to Rubinstein's Paris apartment, and is shown performing excerpts from Liszt Sonata in B minor, Chopin's Scherzo No. 2, Rachmaninov's 3rd Piano Concerto and Alfidi's own original composition. Rubinstein expresses his admiration for Alfidi whom he describes as a "great musician" and predicts that he would become "one of the finest pianists of our time".

Around the same period, Rubinstein persuaded the conductor Emmanuel Krivine to engage Alfidi as soloist with Radio France's Nouvel Orchestre Philharmonique.

In 1982, Alfidi appeared on European television, performing Rachmaninoff's Piano Concerto No 4 with the RTBF Nouvel Orchestra (of Belgium) under Meir Minsky. A concert featuring Alfidi as soloist with the Lorraine Philharmonic Orchestra was televised on French television FR3 in November 1983.

Alfidi later resided in Belgium where he taught piano at the Royal Conservatory of Liège. He died on 2 February 2015, at the age of 65.
