= The Miserly Knight =

- Opera by Sergei Rachmaninoff
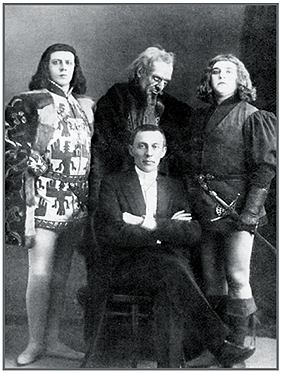
- The composer and members of the premiere cast in 1906
- Native title: Russian: Скупой рыцарь, Skupój rýtsar
- Language: Russian
- Based on: Alexander Pushkin's drama of the same name
- Premiere: 24 January 1906; Bolshoi Theatre, Moscow

The Miserly Knight, Op. 24, also The Covetous Knight (Russian: Скупой рыцарь, Skupój rýtsar’), is a Russian opera in one act with music by Sergei Rachmaninoff, with the libretto based on Alexander Pushkin's drama of the same name. It contains roles for five male singers, but no females. The composer decided essentially to set the Pushkin text as written, and had Feodor Chaliapin in mind for the role of the Baron, however, Chaliapin withdrew from the production over artistic differences.

The first performance was on 24 January (11 January OS) 1906 at the Bolshoi Theatre, Moscow, with the composer himself conducting, in a double-bill performance with another Rachmaninoff opera written contemporaneously, Francesca da Rimini. The director was Vasiliy Shkafer.

Productions of the opera have been rare. In addition, the characterization of the moneylender, who is identified in the story as being Jewish, has been criticized as antisemitic.

== Roles ==
Role	Voice	Premiere Cast 24 January 1906 conductor: Sergei Rachmaninoff
Baron (i.e., the knight of the opera's title)	baritone	Georges Baklanoff
Albert (Albyer), his son	tenor	Anton Bonachich
Ivan, servant (sluga)	bass	
Moneylender (Rostovschik)	tenor	Stepan Barsukov
Duke (Gyertsog)	baritone	Ivan Gryzunov

== Synopsis ==
Place: England
The Middle Ages

=== Scene 1 ===
Albert is a young knight who devotes himself to jousting and courtly pleasures, but is now deeply in debt as a result. His father, a very wealthy but equally frugal baron, refuses to support his son's lifestyle. Albert's ability to maneuver in society is now limited, and he tries to obtain a loan from outside his family. A money-lender denies Albert a loan, but instead offers Albert poison, to allow Albert to murder his father. Albert is appalled at such a suggestion. He resolves then to go to the Duke to make his appeal.

=== Scene 2 ===
The Baron descends to his cellars, exultant now because he has accumulated enough gold to fill his sixth and final storage chest, and gloats before them. However, he realizes that if he died soon, his son Albert could then claim the fortune and fritter it away on his sensual pleasures.

=== Scene 3 ===
Albert has appealed to the Duke for help in obtaining money from his father. Albert hides, as the Duke summons the Baron to a meeting. The Duke asks the Baron to support his son, but the Baron accuses Albert of wanting to steal from him. Albert then angrily reveals his presence and accuses his own father of lying. The Baron challenges Albert to a duel, and Albert accepts. The duke rebukes the father, and banishes the son from his court. However, stressed by this confrontation, the baron collapses fatally. As the Baron dies, his last request is not for his son, but the keys to his chests of gold.

== Recordings ==
Audio

- Melodiya Records SRBL 4121 as The Covetous Knight: Lev Kuznetsov, Ivan Budrin; Moscow Radio Symphony Orchestra; Gennady Rozhdestvensky, conductor. 2 LPs, with Isle of the Dead, by the U.S.S.R. Symphony Orchestra with Yevgeny Svetlanov, conductor.
- Deutsche Grammophon 453 454-2 (1997): Sergei Aleksashkin (The Baron), Sergej Larin (Albert), Vladimir Chernov (The Duke), Ian Caley (Jewish Moneylender), Anatoly Kotscherga (Servant); Gothenburg Symphony Orchestra; Neeme Järvi, conductor.
- Russian Season LDC 288 080, as The Miserly Knight (1994): Mikhail Krutikov (Svetlov) (The Baron), Nikolai Vassiliev (Albert), Vladimir Matorin (The Duke), Vitaly Tarashchenko (Jewish Moneylender), Nikolai Rechetniak (Servant); Russian State Choir; Bolshoi Theatre Orchestra; Andrey Chistiakov, conductor.
- Chandos CHAN 10264: Mikhail Guzhov (The Baron), Vsevolod Grivnov (Albert), Andrei Baturkin (The Duke), Borislav Molchanov (Jewish Moneylender), Vitaly Efanov (Servant); Russian State Symphony Orchestra; Valeri Polyansky, conductor.
- Chandos CHAN 10544: Ildar Abdrazakov (The Baron), Misha Didyk (Albert), Sergey Murzaev (The Duke), Peter Bronder (Jewish Moneylender), Gennady Bezzubenkov (Servant); BBC Philharmonic; Gianandrea Noseda, conductor.
- Naxos 8.557817: excerpts from The Miserly Knight, with Boiko Zvetanov, Niko Isakov and Plamen Beykov; Sofia National Opera Orchestra; Nayden Todorov, conductor.
- Profil Medien, Rachmaninoff: Complete Operas, Cantatas & Fragments (2022): historical recordings including The Miserly Knight, with Vladimir Zakharov, Vladislav Radziyevsky, Nikolay Zakharov and Vadim Ruslanov; Moscow Philharmonic Orchestra; Vassili Nebolsin, conductor.

Video

- Opus Arte OA 0919 D: Sergei Leiferkus (The Baron), Richard Berkeley-Steele (Albert), Maxim Mikhailov (Servant), Viacheslav Voynarovskiy (Jewish Moneylender), Albert Schagidullin (The Duke), Matilda Leyser; London Philharmonic Orchestra; Vladimir Jurowski, conductor; directed by Annabel Arden.

== Books ==
- Rachmaninoff, Sergei; von Riesemann, Oskar (1970) [1934]. Rachmaninoff's Recollections, Told to Oskar Von Riesemann. Freeport, New York: Books for Libraries Press. ISBN 978-0-8369-5232-2.
- Martyn, Barrie (1990). Rachmaninoff: Composer, Pianist, Conductor. Aldershot: Scolar Press. ISBN 978-0-859-67809-4.
- Harrison, Max (2006). Rachmaninoff: Life, Works, Recordings. London: Bloomsbury Publishing. ISBN 978-0-826-49312-5.
- Ito, Yuki (2023). Insights on Rachmaninoff -from the Cellist’s perspective- (in Japanese). Tokyo: Keigado Publishing. ISBN 978-4-87430-052-7.
