= Francesca da Rimini (Rachmaninoff) =

Opera by Sergei Rachmaninoff

- Opera by Sergei Rachmaninoff
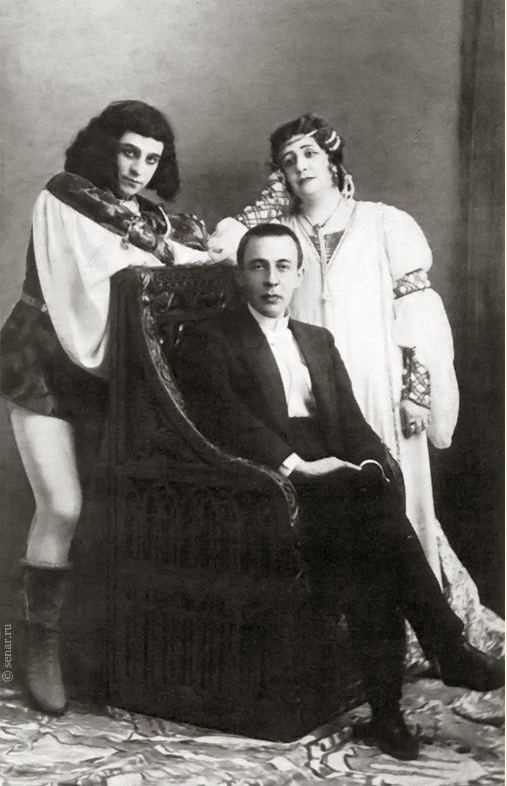
- The composer and members of the premiere cast in 1906
- Native title: Russian: Франческа да Римини
- Librettist: Modest Ilyich Tchaikovsky
- Language: Russian
- Based on: story of Francesca da Rimini in Dante's Inferno
- Premiere: 24 January 1906; Bolshoi Theatre, Moscow

Francesca da Rimini (Russian: Франческа да Римини), Op. 25, is an opera in a prologue, two tableaux and an epilogue by Sergei Rachmaninoff to a Russian libretto by Modest Ilyich Tchaikovsky. It is based on the story of Francesca da Rimini in the fifth canto of Dante's epic poem The Inferno (the first part of the Divine Comedy). The fifth canto is the part about the Second Circle of Hell (Lust).

After the failure of the premiere of his Symphony No. 1 (Op. 13) in March 1897, Rachmaninoff continued to compose some short pieces for piano, song and choral work while appearing in a number of concerts as an opera conductor. Just as he was finally beginning to recover from his ordeal, in January 1900, he had the opportunity to meet with the great Lev Tolstoy. However, he once again lost confidence after receiving harsh criticism for his original song "Fate" (Op. 21–1). After an unsuccessful meeting with Tolstoy meant to revoke his writer's block, relatives decided to introduce Rachmaninoff to the neurologist Nikolai Dahl, to which Rachmaninoff agreed without resistance. Between January and April 1900, Rachmaninoff underwent hypnotherapy and supportive therapy sessions with Dahl on a daily basis for over 3 months, specifically structured to improve his sleep patterns, mood, and appetite and reignite his desire to compose. That summer, Rachmaninoff felt that "new musical ideas began to stir" and successfully resumed composition.

In July 1900, Rachmaninoff finally composed the "Love Duet" for Francesca and Paolo, a key scene in the Francesca da Rimini. This was written earlier than his Piano Concerto No.2, which he began composing in the autumn of 1900, and the "Love Duet" became an important work that marked Rachmaninoff's rebirth as a composer.

He did not resume work on the opera until 1904. The first performance was on 24 January (O.S. 11 January) 1906 at the Bolshoi Theatre, Moscow, with the composer himself conducting, in a double-bill performance with another Rachmaninoff opera written contemporaneously, The Miserly Knight.

== Roles ==
Role	Voice type	Premiere cast 24 January 1906 (Conductor: Sergei Rachmaninoff)
Ghost of Virgil	baritone	
Dante Alighieri	tenor	Dmitri Smirnov
Lanciotto Malatesta	baritone	Georges Baklanoff
Francesca Malatesta, Lanciotto's wife	soprano	Nadejda Salina
Paolo Malatesta, younger brother of Lanciotto	tenor	Anton Bonachich

== Synopsis ==
The setting is the Malatesta castle around the end of the 13th century

=== Prologue ===
The ghost of Virgil leads the poet Dante to the edge of the first circle of the Inferno. They descend into the second, where the wordless chorus of the damned souls is heard. Virgil tells Dante that this is the realms where sinners given over to lust are punished, buffeted by an eternal whirlwind. Dante asks two such souls, Francesca and Paolo, to tell their story.

=== Tableau 1 ===
In the castle courtyard, Lanciotto Malatesta is about to go off to war, but he admits that he no longer takes pleasure in war. Lanciotto is deformed, and knows that his wife, Francesca, does not love him. She had been tricked into marrying Lanceotto by being led to think that she would marry Paolo Malatesta, Lanciotto's handsome younger brother. Lanciotto is suspicious of Francesca and envious of Paolo. He plans to set a trap to catch them in adultery. Francesca then enters, affirming obedience to Lanciotto, but saying that she cannot love him. She asks when he will return, and Lanciotto says that he will not return until after the end of battle. When Francesca leaves, Lanciotto laughs.

=== Tableau 2 ===
Paolo and Francesca are together, alone, in a room in the castle. Paolo tells the story of Sir Lancelot and Queen Guinevere, which parallels their own feelings. While doing so, Paolo declares his love for Francesca. Francesca resists initially, trying to remain faithful to Lanciotto. However, her own resistance erodes at Paolo's continued expressions of love, and her own desire for him. They sing of their secret love, and embrace. Lanciotto has returned, and sees the lovers together. He fatally stabs Paolo and Francesca.

=== Epilogue ===
Paolo and Francesca recede into the whirlwind of the second circle. Dante is overcome with pity and terror, and he and Virgil remain with the thought: 'There is no greater sadness in the world than to remember a time of joy in a time of grief'.

== Recordings ==
- Melodiya: Mikhail Maslov (Virgil's Shade), Alexander Laptev (Dante), Yevgeny Nesterenko (Lanciotto Malatesta), Makvala Kasrashvili (Francesca), Vladimir Atlantov (Paolo); Bolshoi Theatre Choir; Bolshoi Theatre Orchestra; Mark Ermler, conductor.
- Le Chant du Monde / Saison russe: Nikolai Reshetniak (Virgil's Shade), Nikolai Vasiliev (Dante), Vladimir Matorin (Lanciotto Malatesta), Marina Lapina (Francesca), Vitaly Tarashchenko (Paolo); Russian State Choir; Bolshoi Theatre Orchestra; Andrey Chistiakov, conductor.
- Deutsche Grammophon: Sergei Aleksashkin (Virgil's Shade), Ilya Levinsky (Dante), Sergei Leiferkus (Lanciotto Malatesta), Maria Guleghina (Francesca), Sergej Larin (Paolo); Gothenburg Opera Chorus; Gothenburg Symphony Orchestra; Neeme Järvi, conductor. Issued in Rachmaninov: Complete Operas.
- Chandos CHAN10442: Gennady Bezzubenkov (Virgil's Shade), Evgeny Akimov (Dante), Sergey Murzaev (Lanciotto Malatesta), Svetla Vassileva (Francesca), Misha Didyk (Paolo); BBC Singers; BBC Philharmonic; Gianandrea Noseda, conductor.
- Naxos 8.557817: excerpts from Francesca da Rimini, with Mariana Zvetkova (Francesca), Boiko Zvetanov (Paolo), Peter Naydenov, the Sofia National Opera Chorus and the Sofia National Opera Orchestra conducted by Nayden Todorov.

Performance in Kyiv, 2019

== Books ==
- Bertensson, Sergei; Leyda, Jay; Satina, Sophia (2001) [1956]. Sergei Rachmaninoff – A Lifetime in Music. Bloomington, Indiana: Indiana University Press. ISBN 978-0-253-21421-8.
- Rachmaninoff, Sergei; von Riesemann, Oskar (1970) [1934]. Rachmaninoff's Recollections, Told to Oskar Von Riesemann. Freeport, New York: Books for Libraries Press. ISBN 978-0-8369-5232-2.
- Martyn, Barrie (1990). Rachmaninoff: Composer, Pianist, Conductor. Aldershot: Scolar Press. ISBN 978-0-859-67809-4.
- Harrison, Max (2006). Rachmaninoff: Life, Works, Recordings. London: Bloomsbury Publishing. ISBN 978-0-826-49312-5.
- Ito, Yuki (2023). Insights on Rachmaninoff -from the Cellist's perspective- (in Japanese). Tokyo: Keigado Publishing. ISBN 978-4-87430-052-7.
