= Elvira Amazar =

Russian opera singer (1890's–1971)

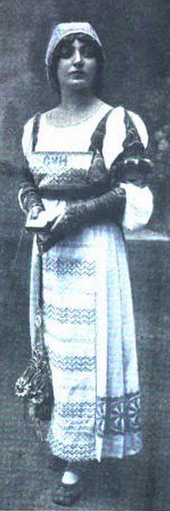
- Elvira Amazar in costume as Marguerite in Faust, from the cover of Musical Courier (September 27, 1917)
- Born: 1890s Serbia
- Died: February 7, 1971; New York City

Elvira Amazar (1890s – February 7, 1971), also known as Vera Amazar or Elaine Amazar, was a Serbian-born Russian-American soprano singer and actress. She was also the subject of the first photograph described as "cheesecake", in 1917.

== Early life ==
Elvira Amazar was born in Serbia. Her father was a mining engineer. She was orphaned as a small girl, when both parents died during a strike. Relatives in Poland took her in, and she was educated in Germany and Moscow. She studied music in Paris and Milan. Among her teachers were Félia Litvinne and Umberto Masetti.

== Career ==
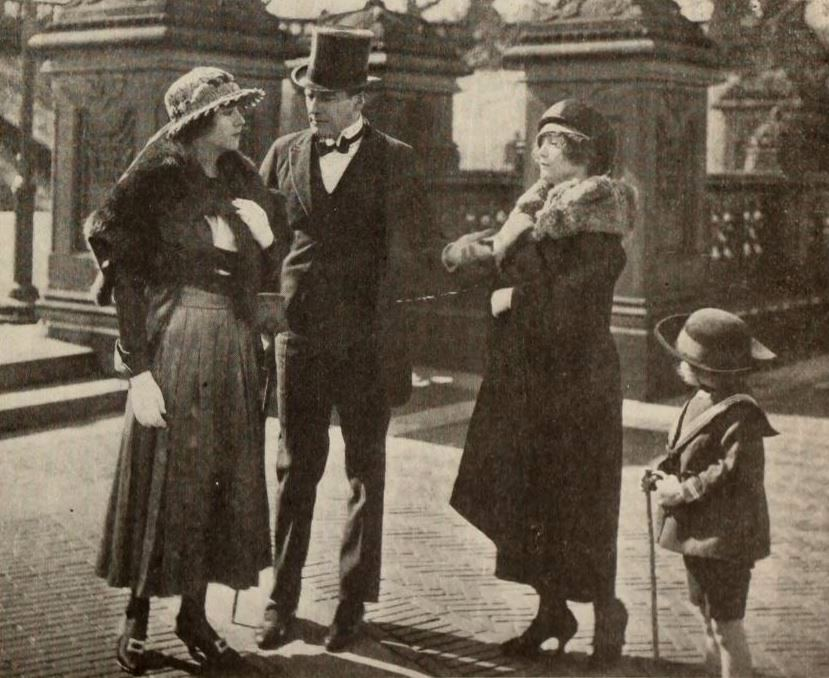
As a Man Thinks (1919) – 3

Amazar began her singing career at the Marinskiy Theater in St. Petersburg (Petrograd), Russia, in Il Pagliacci by Leoncavallo and found further success in Monte Carlo and Milan. She moved to the United States during World War I, a member of the Boston National Opera Company and a client of the Bel Canto Music Bureau. She sued her lover, baritone Georges Baklanoff, for an assault while they were on a Pacific Coast tour in 1917. They later reached a settlement.

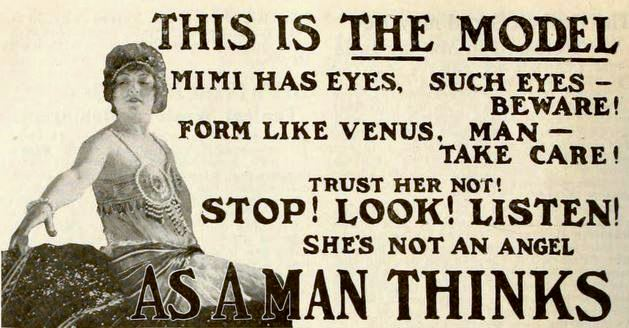
A print advertisement for As a Man Thinks (1919), describing the seductive model character played by Amazar

Amazar appeared in three silent films, The Volcano (1919), As a Man Thinks (1919), and L'Aviateur Masqué (1922). She had a cabaret act in Paris in 1920.

In 1917 she appeared in Ziegfeld's Follies of 1917. In 1925, Amazar was in the cast of another revue, Sinners of 1925, in New York. In 1927 and 1928, she was in the cast of Blossom Time, an operetta based loosely on the life of composer Franz Schubert.

== "Cheesecake" ==
Amazar was known for wearing short skirts and high heels, and is often mentioned in connection with the term "cheesecake". As the story goes, in 1915, Amazar raised her skirt to show some of her bare leg for a photograph. The photographer was George Miller. Miller's editor liked the image enough to declare it "better than cheesecake," and the word "cheesecake" became a term for photographs of attractive young women baring some skin.

== Personal life ==
Elvira Amazar was involved with a married colleague, George Baklanoff, for several years. (His wife and children lived in Russia.) Her claims that he deceived her into traveling with him led to their arrests in Chicago, under the Mann Act, in 1920. The couple left for Paris soon after they were charged; Baklanoff was allowed to re-enter the United States in 1921, and the deportation orders were dropped by 1922. She became a citizen of the United States in 1929.

She had a daughter, Tatiana Amazar (1911–1979), born in Russia, who became a cookbook author and food editor. Elvira Amazar died in New York City in 1971, in her seventies.
