= Windsor Festival =

The Windsor Festival was founded in 1969 with Yehudi Menuhin and Ian Hunter as artistic directors and Laurence West as executive chairman. The original idea for the festival was put forward by Hunter to the Dean of Windsor in 1968, building on the participation of the Menuhin Festival Orchestra with Menuhin using St George's Chapel, the State Apartments of Windsor Castle and the Theatre Royal. The Dean formed the Windsor Festival Society, which then moved to plan the first festival.

Since that time, the festival has continued to attract distinguished artists from around the world, including Dame Judi Dench, Dame Kiri Te Kanawa, Sir Charles Mackerras, André Previn and Arthur Rubinstein, for concerts in Windsor Castle and Eton College and throughout the Royal Borough.

== See also ==
- Windsor Festival International String Competition
