= Georges Baklanoff =

Russian opera singer (1880/81–1938)

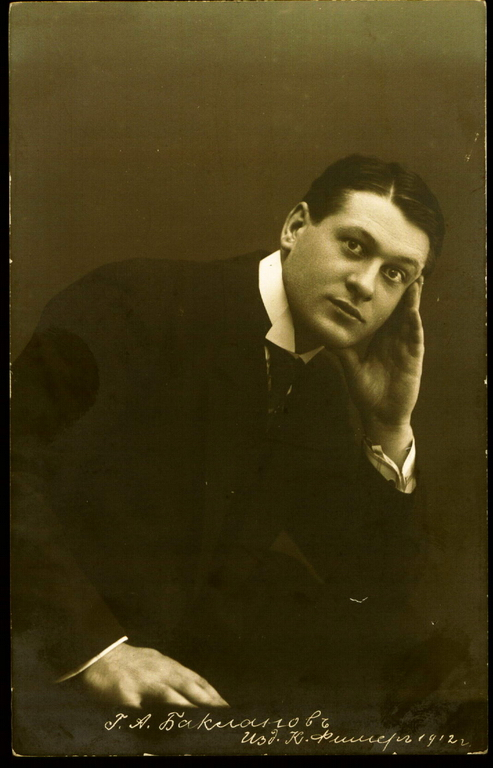

Background information
- Genres: opera
- Instrument: baritone

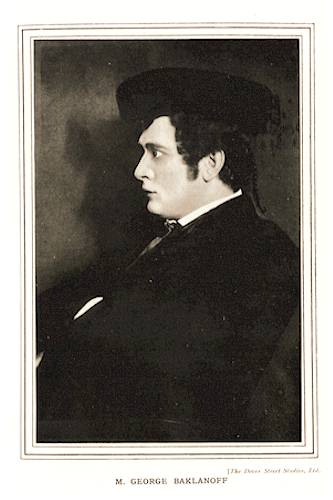
Georges Baklanoff as Escamillo.

Georgy Andreyevich Baklanoff, known as Georges Baklanoff (sometimes spelled Baklanov; 4 January 1881 [O.S. 23 December 1880] – 6 December 1938) was a Russian operatic baritone who had an active international career from 1903 until his death in 1938. Possessing a powerful and flexible voice, he sang roles from a wide variety of musical periods and in many languages. He was also highly praised by audience and critics for his acting abilities.

Baklanoff's early career was spent performing with major theatres in Russia; including the Bolshoi and Mariinsky theatres. In 1910 he began performing with important opera houses internationally, and became a member of both the Boston Opera Company (1910–1915) and the Vienna State Opera (1912–1914). From 1917 to 1928 he was the leading baritone in Chicago and in 1928–1929 he was a member of the Philadelphia Civic Opera Company. From 1932 until his death in 1938 he was a member of Theatre Basel. He also appeared as a guest artist with important theatres internationally.

== Early life, education, and career in Russia ==
Baklanoff was born Alfons-Georg Bakkis in Riga, Latvia. In 1892 he moved to Kiev after the death of his parents. He initially planned to pursue a career as a lawyer, and studied law at both Kiev University and Saint Petersburg State University. His studies were interrupted due to financial difficulties resulting from the theft of his assets by his legal guardian; a man who eventually committed suicide. He then entered the Kiev Conservatory, and after graduating studied singing for two more years in St. Petersburg with the Russian tenor Ippolit Pryanishnikov. He pursued further training in Milan, Italy in 1902 with Vittorio Vanzo.

Baklanoff made his professional opera debut in 1903 in Kiev in the title role of Anton Rubinstein's The Demon. That same year he joined the newly formed Zimin Opera. In 1905 he became a member artist at the Bolshoi Theatre in Moscow where he notably created the title role in the world premiere of Sergei Rachmaninoff's The Miserly Knight and Lanciotto Malatesta in Rachmaninoff's Francesca da Rimini on 24 January 1906. From 1907 to 1909 he was committed to the Mariinsky Theatre in St. Petersburg. There he sang the role of Fyodor Poyarok in the Moscow premiere of Nikolai Rimsky-Korsakov's The Legend of the Invisible City of Kitezh and the Maiden Fevroniya.

== Rise to international success ==
In 1910 Baklanoff made debuts with three important companies, the Boston Opera Company (as The Miserly Knight), the Metropolitan Opera in New York City (as Verdi's Rigoletto), and the Royal Opera House in London (as Rigoletto and Scarpia in Puccini's Tosca). Although he never again performed at the Met, he returned frequently to Boston for performances up through 1915. In 1911 he sang Rigoletto for his debut at the Komische Oper Berlin and the title role in Pyotr Ilyich Tchaikovsky's Eugene Onegin for his first performance in France at the Théâtre Sarah Bernhardt in Paris. He was soon after engaged as a guest artist at the Paris Opera, the Frankfurt Opera, and with theatres in South America. From 1912 to 1916 he was a member of the Vienna State Opera. In 1914 he sang in the posthumous world premiere of Amilcare Ponchielli's I Mori di Valenza at the Opéra de Monte-Carlo.

== Career in Chicago and Philadelphia ==
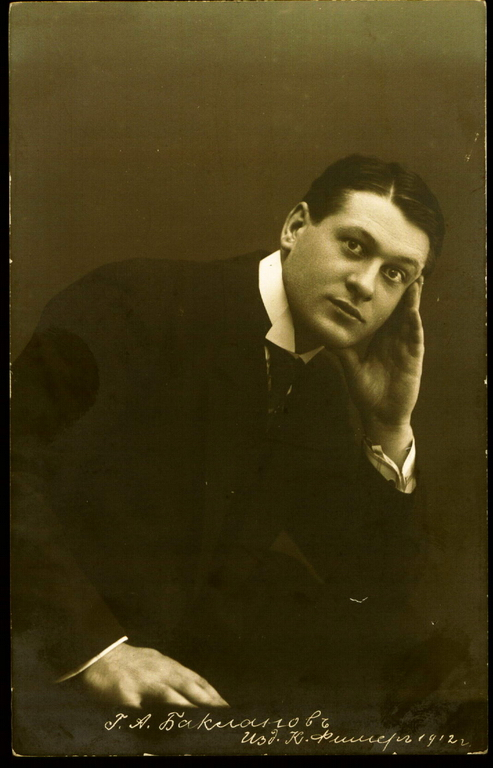
Georges Baklanoff

From 1917 to 1921 Baklanoff sang with the Chicago Opera Association and from 1922 to 1928 he performed with the Chicago Civic Opera. In Chicago he sang in the United States premieres of Henry Février's Monna Vanna (1918), Xavier Leroux's Le chemineau (1919, title role), and Rimsky-Korsakov's The Snow Maiden (1923); all at the Chicago Auditorium. Among the roles he sang in Chicago were Amonasro in Verdi's Aida, Athanaël in Jules Massenet's Thaïs, Escamillo in Georges Bizet's Carmen, the Father in Gustave Charpentier's Louise, King Raimondo in Pietro Mascagni's Isabeau, Méphistophélès in Charles Gounod's Faust, Nilakantha in Léo Delibes' Lakmé, Renato in Verdi's Un ballo in maschera, Rigoletto, Telramund in Richard Wagner's Lohengrin, and Wotan in Wagner's Die Walküre.

In 1928–1929 Baklanoff was a member of the Philadelphia Civic Opera Company; singing such roles as Escamillo, Le chemineau, Méphistophélès, and Wotan. In 1929 he performed the title role in the United States premiere of Modest Mussorgsky's Boris Godunov in a concert version with the Philadelphia Orchestra, soprano Rose Bampton, and conductor Leopold Stokowski. He sang with the Philadelphia Orchestra again in 1935 as Agamemnon in the United States premiere of Christoph Willibald Gluck's Iphigénie en Aulide; this time under the baton of Alexander Smallens.

== Later life and career in Europe ==
While mainly working in the United States from 1917 to 1929, Baklanoff continued to appear as a guest artist with major opera houses in Europe during those years and into the 1930s. Some of the theatres with whom he performed were the Bavarian State Opera, the Belgrade National Theatre, the Brno National Theatre, the Croatian National Theatre in Zagreb, the Finnish National Opera, the Hungarian State Opera House, the Opéra-Comique, the Royal Danish Theatre, the Royal Swedish Opera, the Vienna Volksoper, and the Zurich Opera. In 1932 he moved to Basel, Switzerland, making his debut with Theater Basel that year in the title role of Mozart's Don Giovanni. He lived in that city until his death there 6 years later, having never retired. At one point during his life he was married to the soprano Lydia Lipkowska. He also had a tumultuous five-year relationship with soprano Elvira Amazar.

== Legacy ==
His archival fund was gifted to the Swiss state by his widow Anna Baklanoff in 1952. The responsibility of its storage was given to the Swiss Association for Theatre Culture (Schweizerische Gesellschaft für Theaterkultur). The funds are archived at SAPA Foundation, Swiss Archive of the Performing Arts.
