= Ahmed Achour =

Tunisian music conductor and composer (1945–2021)

- Born: February 6, 1945; Hammam-Lif
- Died: January 29, 2021 (aged 75)
- Occupations: Conductor; Composer

Ahmed Achour (Arabic: أحمد عاشور) was a Tunisian conductor.

== Biography ==
Achour was born in Hammam Lif. After studying law, he studied music and violin at the Tunis Conservatory of Music in Tunis in 1967 where he obtained a diploma in Arabic music and the Presidential Award for violin. He continued his musical studies at the Schola Cantorum in Paris, where he received degrees in several specialties: harmony, counterpoint, conducting and orchestral writing.

When he returned to Tunis in 1971, he joined the Tunisian Symphony Orchestra as first violin. In 1979, he became responsible for directing and administering and over the years worked with many international musicians. He then assumed the direction of the National Conservatory of Music in Tunis and the International Festival of Popular Arts.

Achour has presented numerous concerts with symphony orchestras in Moscow, St. Petersburg, Paris, Brive-la-Gaillarde, Rabat, Algiers and produced operas by Carl Maria von Weber, Abu Hassan, in Sofia (Bulgaria). He won the National Music Prize in 2005.

== Death ==
Achour died on Friday January 29, 2021, at the age of 75.

== Works ==
- Élyssa (ouverture pour orchestre)
- Mosaïques de mon pays (ouverture pour orchestre)
- Prélude Jenin 2000 (Le Camp de la mort)
- Variations orientales
- Danse des marionnettes
- Rhapsodie El Jem pour violoncelle et orchestre
- Illusions pour piano et orchestre à cordes
- Stress pour alto et orchestre à cordes
- Balade pour violon, alto et orchestre
- Trio « Le Destin » pour violon, violoncelle et piano
- Quatre esquisses pour cordes
- Sinfonietta Méditerranée pour orchestre à cordes
- Images pour orchestre à cordes
- Métamorphoses pour flûte et orchestre
- Concerto pour clarinette et orchestre
- Paysages de Sidi Bou Saïd pour clarinette
- Nostalgie pour clarinette
- Concerto pour trombone et orchestre
