= Guillaume Rambourg =

Franco-Canadian asset manager and philanthropist (born 1971)

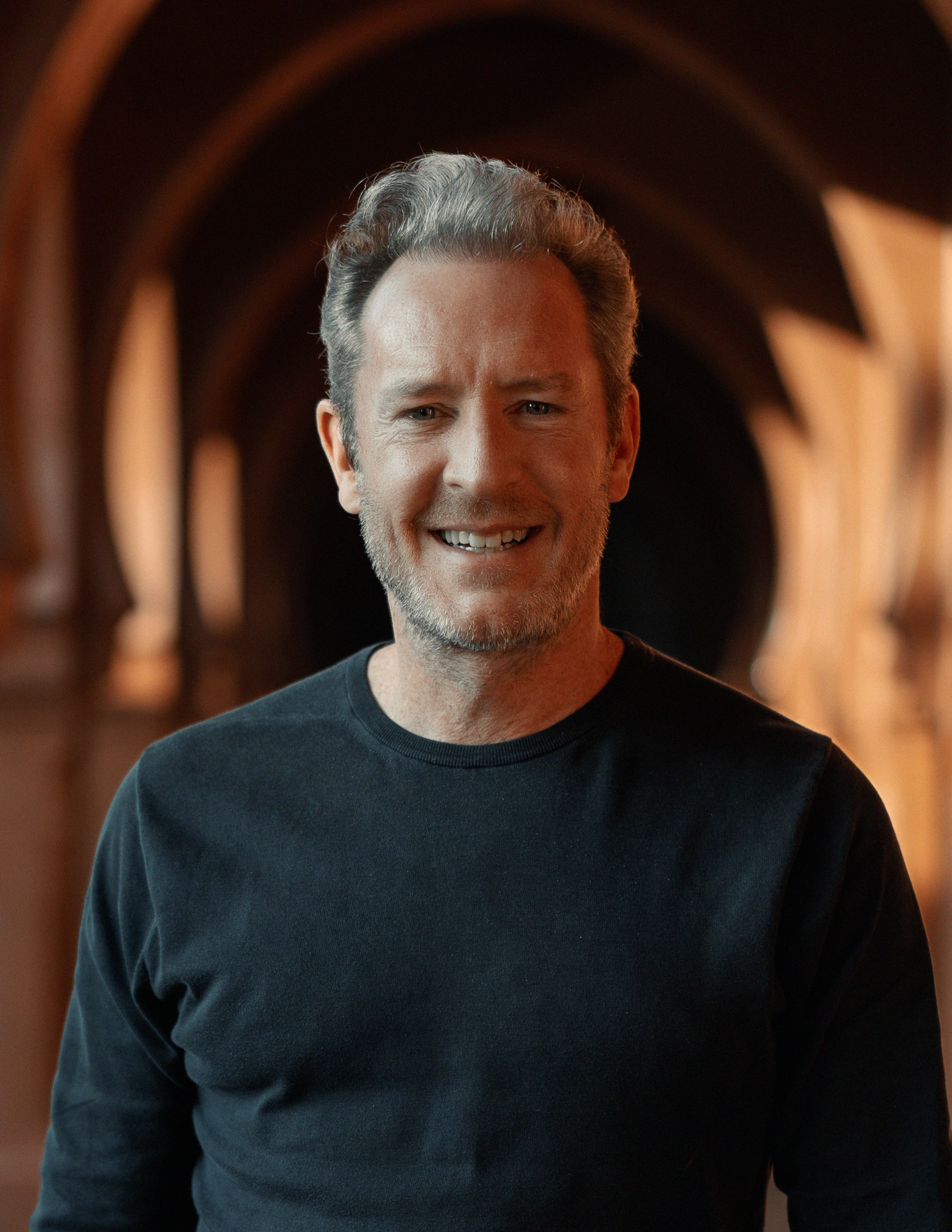
- Born: Guillaume Rambourg; January 8, 1971 (age 55); Ottawa, Canada
- Occupations: Asset manager (retired); Philanthropist
- Years active: 1995–2018
- Works: Rambourg Foundation
- Spouse: Sarah Ben Hsouna (m. 2023)
- Children: 7

Guillaume Rambourg (born January 8, 1971) is a Franco-Canadian asset manager and philanthropist. He is the former deputy managing director at Gartmore Investment Management, a leading firm in the asset management sector. He is also the founder of the Rambourg Foundation, which focuses on promoting education, art, sports, culture, and Human Rights.

== Early life and education ==
Rambourg was born on January 8, 1971, in Ottawa, Canada, to French parents. His father, Michel Rambourg, was a United Nations diplomat, and his mother, Nicole, was a history and geography professor. He spent much of his childhood in New York City before his family moved to France in 1985. He attended the prestigious Lycée Henri-IV and later graduated from the École Supérieure des Sciences Économiques et Commerciales (ESSEC)

== Career ==
Rambourg began his career in asset management in 1995, becoming one of the principal managers and shareholders at the British firm Gartmore Group. He was instrumental in shaping the company's investment strategies and held considerable influence within the organization. However, in 2010, Gartmore suspended Rambourg for internal rule violations concerning order transmission practices. The suspension caused a 31% drop in the company’s stock price. Despite the controversy, Rambourg was later cleared by the UK Financial Services Authority (FSA) in 2011.

In 2011, after 18 years in London’s financial sector, Rambourg launched Verrazzano Capital, a hedge fund he led until his retirement from finance in January 2018.

== Philanthropy ==
Following his departure from finance, Rambourg focused on philanthropy through the Rambourg Foundation, which he founded to promote education, the arts, sports, and cultural preservation, particularly in Tunisia. The foundation plays a significant role in supporting initiatives aimed at fostering social and cultural development in underserved communities.

In addition to his work with the foundation, Rambourg has also supported young athletes, including tennis players such as American Coco Gauff from 2015 to 2018 and Greek player Stefanos Tsitsipas, offering one of his first sponsorship deals.

== Personal life ==
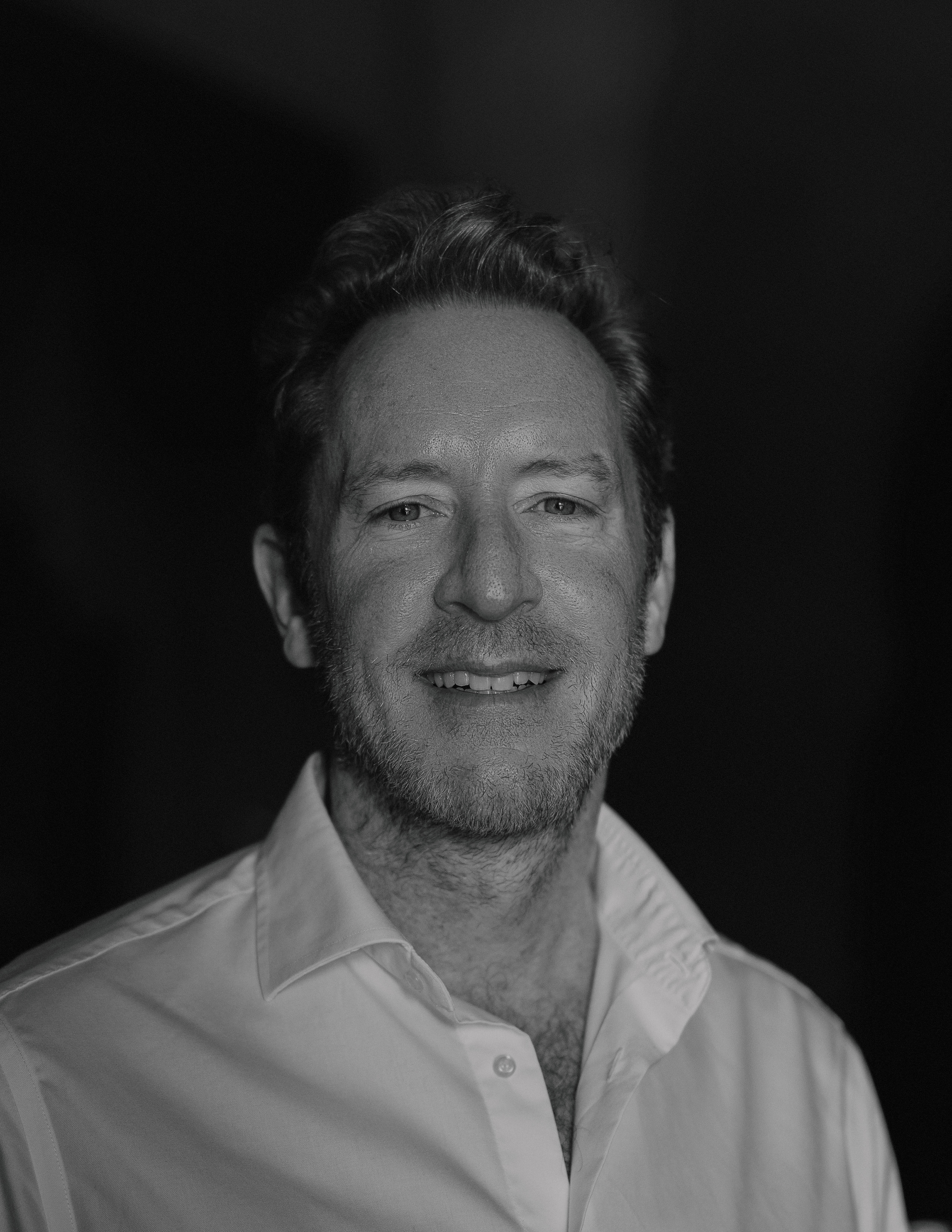
Portrait of Guillaume Rambourg for Wikipedia article

Rambourg has long been committed to addressing social inequalities, a passion that developed during his upbringing in New York and travels throughout Africa with his diplomat father. He has maintained close ties to his French roots and to France’s political landscape. He reportedly became acquainted with Emmanuel Macron during Macron’s time as an advisor at the Élysée Palace, and helped connect the future president with French finance professionals in London. During Macron’s 2017 presidential campaign, Rambourg was one of his major individual donors, contributing the legal maximum of €7,500.

In 2023, Rambourg married Sarah Ben Hsouna.
