= Tunisian Symphony Orchestra =

Symphony orchestra in Tunisia

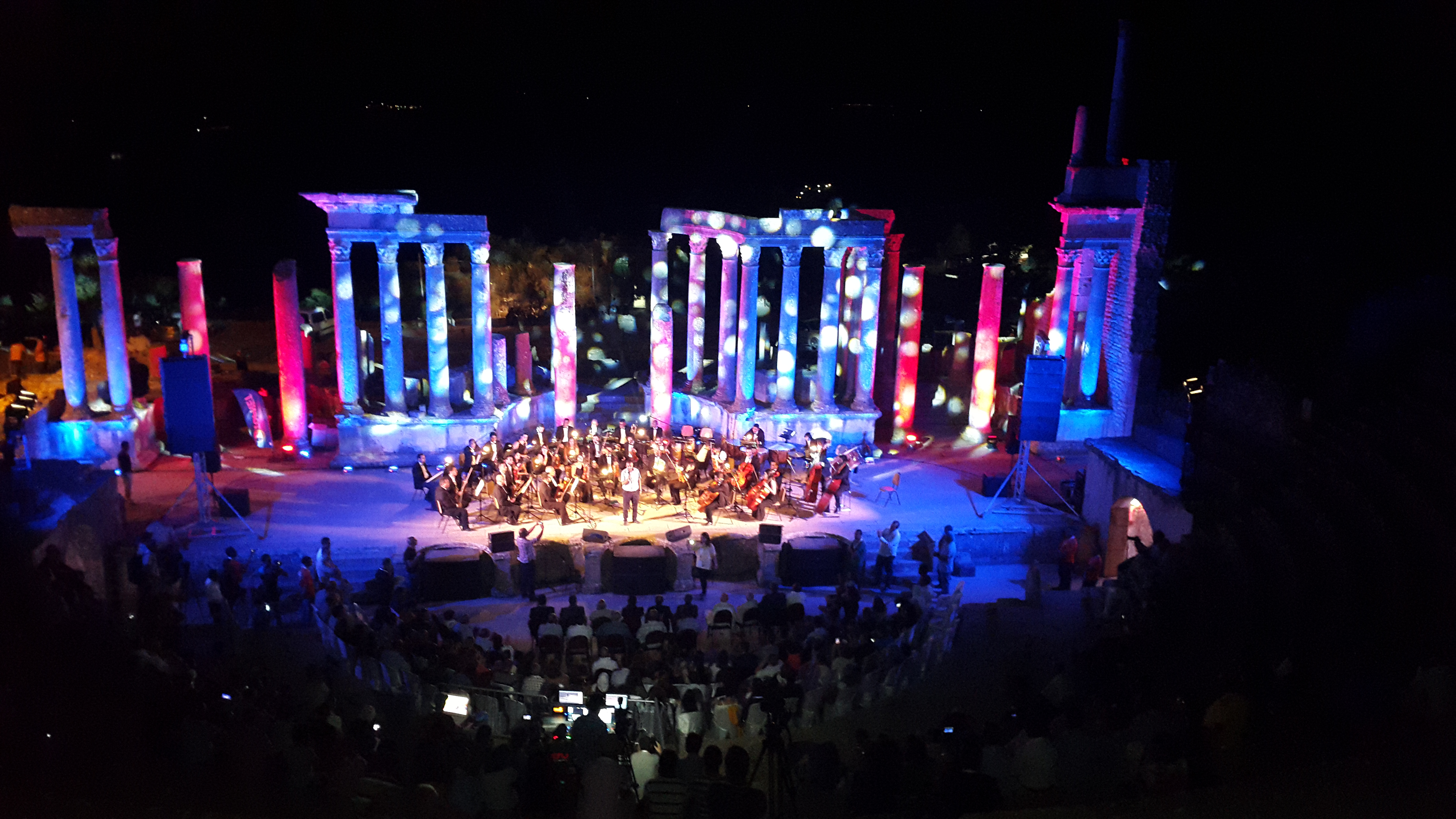
The Tunisian Symphony Orchestra at the International Festival of Dougga in 2016

Tunisian Symphony Orchestra is the national symphony orchestra of Tunisia, based in Tunis. The orchestra was established in 1969 by the Ministry of Culture. It was led by Ahmed Achour from 1979 until 2010, when after falling ill, he was replaced by Sem Slimane.

== History ==
The creation in 1969 of the Tunisian Symphony Orchestra was an initiative of the Ministry of Culture. It is placed under the direction of Salah El Mahdi.

At the beginning, the orchestra uses the recruitment of some Bulgarian teachers-instrumentalists - Mr. Hovanes and Minef and Mrs. Tiffilova and Beleve - to a French conductor - Jean-Paul Nicollet - and several Italian musicians, among which the violinist Guezeppe Venesia, the cellist Bonora, the double bassist Valenti and Mrs. Tescuba Perla. Among the first directors of the orchestra is Fernand Depa, followed by Nicollet, Ahmed Achour becomes the main conductor from 1979.

The greatest Tunisian performers have performed with him, including Sem Slimane, Rachid Koubaa, Bacem Anas Romdhani, Hichem Amari, Mondher Tammar, Mohamed Makni, Hichem makni, Hafedh makni and Bassem Makni. Among the famous works played by the orchestra are Symphony No. 39, under the baton of Jean-Paul Nicollet, Symphony No. 40, under the baton of Ulysses Waterlot, The Magic Flute and Ascanio in Alba by Mozart, L'italiana in Algeri by Rossini, Symphony No. 1 by Beethoven, under the baton of Ahmed Achour, or Carmen by Georges Bizet. It also produces compositions of Tunisian musicians like Salah El Mahdi, Ahmed Achour, Slim Larbi and Ouanès Khligène.

The Tunisian Symphony Orchestra participates in 1988 in the Festival of Classical Music of Algeria. During the closing night of the twentieth edition of the Festival international de musique symphonique d'El Jem, the group of Juan Carmona and the Tunisian Symphony Orchestra presents Sinfonia Flamenca.

On May 31, 2008 at the Municipal Theatre of Tunis, he presented Mogador by Jalloul Ayed, with the participation of the musicians of the Philharmonic Orchestra of Morocco and gave a concert with the Algerian National Symphony Orchestra on July 27, during the 23rd edition of the International Festival of Symphonic Music of El Jem.

On October 15 and 16, 2008, he presented a concert with the Algerian National Symphony Orchestra at the Algerian National Theater in Algiers and at the House of Culture in Sétif under the direction of the Algerian Rachid Saouli and the Tunisian Ahmed Achour.

== Art Directors ==
- Jean-Paul Nicollet (1969-1979)
- Ahmed Achour (1979-2010)
- Sem Slimane (2010-2012)
- Hafedh Makni (2012-2018)
- Mohamed Bouslama (2018-2019)
- Hichem Amari (2019-2020)
- Mohamed Bouslama (since 2020-?)
