= Kène ya ma kène... =

- Directed by: Hichem Ben Ammar
- Screenplay by: Hichem Ben Ammar
- Produced by: Hicham Ben Ammar
- Starring: Bacem Anas Romdhani
- Cinematography: Hatem Nechi Abdessabour Belarbi Hichem Ben Ammar Rabii Messaoudi Anne Closset Louise Purnell Elodie Colomar Walid Mattar
- Edited by: Inès Chérif
- Release date: 2010
- Running time: 85 minutes
- Country: Tunisia

Kène ya ma kène... or Once Upon Our Time (French: Un Conte de Faits) is a 2010 Tunisian documentary film directed by Hichem Ben Ammar and starring Bacem Anas Romdhani.

== Synopsis ==
In a popular neighborhood of Tunis, a trombonist dreams of his son, Bacem Anas Romdhani, becoming a great musician. The son makes his father's dream his own, and develops extraordinary aptitudes with the violin. After winning several international competitions, he is offered the chance to enroll in the prestigious The Yehudi Menuhin School in London. The film shows Bacem Anas’ journey, the obstacles he faces on the way, and his evolution while in Europe from 2006 to 2010.

== Cast ==
- Bacem Anas Romdhani
- Abderraouf Romdhani

== Awards ==
- Verona African Film Festival 2010
- African, Asian and Latin American Film Festival of Milan 2010
