= Rambourg Foundation =

Tunisian philanthropic organization

- Founded: 2011
- Founder: Guillaume Rambourg.
- Type: Non-profit
- Location: London
- Origins: UK
- Key people: Shiran Ben Abderrazak (CEO) Sarah Ben Hsouna (President)
- Website: Official website

The Rambourg Foundation is a nonprofit organization founded in 2011 by Guillaume Rambourg. Originally founded as a charity in the United Kingdom,

Since 2023, the foundation has been led and presided by Sarah Ben Hsouna, its mission is to promote cultural heritage and social development.

== Objectives and mission ==
The mission of the Rambourg Foundation is to facilitate public access to arts and culture by promoting education, sports and handicrafts especially among young Tunisians. The foundation works through its programs to develop a knowledge and creative economy with a special focus on the most remote areas of the country.

== Projects and activities ==
- The Rise of the Nation: Art at the Dawn of Modern Tunisia (1837-1881): an exhibition organised with the collaboration of the organized by the National Heritage Institute to shed lights on a forgotten period in the Tunisian modern history under the rules of the Beys, former kings of Tunisia.
- The Rambourg Foundation Prize for Contemporary Art.
- Inauguration of a cultural center of arts and crafts in Djebel Semmama located in the region of Kasserine to create better opportunities for young people.

== Publications ==
The awakening of a nation, art at the dawn of modern Tunisia (1837–1881) under the direction of Ridha Moumni, November 2016 (ISBN 978-8-899-76525-5).
