= Windsor Festival International String Competition =

Music competition held in the UK

The Windsor Festival International String Competition is a music competition held in the United Kingdom for performers of violin, cello, and viola. The event is held biennially at Windsor Castle in Windsor. It aims to seek out exceptional young string soloists, and to, through the prize package, launch the winner's professional career.

== History ==
In 2008, Windsor Festival launched its International String Competition in honour of Sir Yehudi Menuhin.

The Windsor Festival International String Competition (WFISC) was inaugurated in 2008 to honor the festival's founder, Sir Yehudi Menuhin. Held biennially at Windsor Castle, the competition seeks to identify and support exceptional young string soloists, providing them with opportunities to launch their professional careers. Over the years, WFISC has become one of the foremost competitions of its kind, attracting talented violinists, violists, and cellists from around the world. Notable past winners include cellist Brian O'Kane (2008), violinist Diana Galvydyte (2009), and cellist Andrew Byun (2024).

== Competition format ==
The first round is judged by submission of a video, and eight candidates out of around 200 applicants proceed through to the live rounds in Windsor, UK. The Semi-finals see each competitor perform a 45-minute public recital. Three go through to the Final round, where they compete by playing a 25-minute public recital in front of an audience in the Waterloo Chamber of the Windsor Castle. Prizes are presented by Festival Patron, HRH The Earl of Wessex.

In 2019, the number of accepted Semi-finalists increased from eight to twelve candidates. In 2021, with the global COVID-19 pandemic restricting travel across the world, the competition was held virtually.

== Past winners ==
Year	Winner	Second Prize	Third Prize	Audience Prize
2008	Brian O'Kane	Joo Yon Sir	Not awarded	David McCaroll
2009	Diana Galvydyte	Savitri Grier	Not awarded	Diana Galvydyte
2011	Yuki Ito	Jiafeng Chen	Michael Petrov	Michael Petrov
2013	Benjamin Baker	Yuka Ishizuka	Marisol Lee	Benjamin Baker
2015	Ji Yoon Lee	Timothy Ridout	Elina Buksha	Elina Buksha
2017	Nathan Meltzer	Jonian Ilias Kadesha	Luke Hsu	Nathan Meltzer
2019	Jonathan Swensen	Jamal Aliyev	Mathilde Milwidsky	Jamal Aliyev
2021	Daniil Bulayev	SongHa Choi	Otoha Tabata	Daniil Bulayev
2024	Andrew Ilhoon Byun	Leon Blekh	Leland Ko	Leon Blekh

=== 2009 competition ===
The overall winner of the 2nd WFISC was Diana Galyvdyte from Lithuania who also won the Audience Prize, as voted for by the audience on the night of the Final. The Second Prize went to Savitri Grier.

=== 2011 competition ===
The overall winner of the 3rd WFISC was Yuki Ito from Japan. The Second Prize went to Jiafeng Chen, and Third Prize was awarded to Michael Petrov, who also won the Audience Prize, as voted for by the audience on the night of the Final. The judging panel for the final consisted of Eugene Sarbu, Paul Silverthorne, Gustav Rivinius, Owain Arwel Hughes CBE, and Sean Bishop.

=== 2013 competition ===
The winner of the 4th WFISC was Benjamin Baker from New Zealand. Baker also won the Audience Prize, as voted for by the audience on the night of the Final. The Second Prize went to Yuka Ishizuka, and Third Prize was awarded to Marisol Lee. The judging panel for the final consisted of Erich Gruenberg, Paul Silverthorne, Thomas Demenga, David Whelton, and Alexander Van Ingen.

=== 2015 competition ===
The overall winner of the 5th WFISC was Ji Yoon Lee from South Korea. The Second Prize went to Timothy Ridout from Britain, and Third Prize was awarded to Elina Buksha from Latvia, who also won the Audience Prize, as voted for by the audience on the night of the Final. The judging panel for the final consisted of Erich Gruenberg, Roger Benedict, Raphael Wallfisch, David Whelton, Alexander Van Ingen, and Martin Denny.

=== 2017 competition ===
The winner of the 6th WFISC was then 16-year-old violinist Nathan Meltzer from the United States. The second prize went to Jonian Ilias from Greece, and third prize went to Luke Hse from the United States. The jury consisted of Pierre Amoyal, Edward Vanderspar, Raphael Wallfisch, Helen Sprott, Alexander Van Ingen, and Martin Denny.

=== 2019 competition ===
The winner of the 7th WFISC was cellist Jonathan Swensen from Denmark. The second prize was awarded to cellist Jamal Aliyev from Turkey, and the third prize was awarded to violinist Mathilde Milwidsky from England. The jury consisted of Pierre Amoyal, Wolfram Christ, David Strange, Martin Denny, Alexander Van Ingen, and Hellen Sprott.

=== 2021 competition ===
The winner of the 8th WFISC was violinist Daniil Bulayev from Latvia. The second prize went to violinist SongHa Choi from South Korea, and third place went to violinist Otoha Tabata from Japan. The jury consisted of Clio Gould, Martin Outram, Jo Cole, Martin Denny, and Alexander Van Ingen. The 2021 competition was held virtually because of the COVID-19 pandemic.

=== 2024 competition ===
The winner of the 9th WFISC was Canadian-Korean cellist Andrew Byun. The second prize went to violinist Leon Blekh from Belgium, and third prize went to American-Canadian cellist Leland Ko. The jury consisted of Joji Hattori, Lars Tomter, Natalie Clein, Martin Denny, Alexander Van Ingen, and James Williams.

== See also ==
- List of classical music competitions#String instruments
