= Suite No. 1 (Rachmaninoff) =

1893 musical work for two pianos

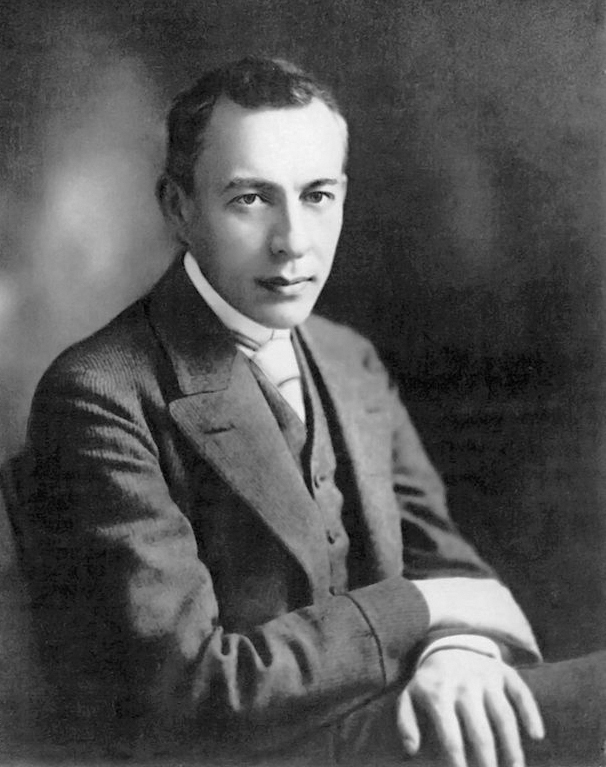
Sergei Rachmaninoff in 1901

Suite No. 1 in G minor (or Fantaisie-tableaux), Op. 5, is a suite for two pianos written by Sergei Rachmaninoff. The suite, a musical depiction of four poems, was written in the summer of 1893 at the Lysikof estate in Lebeden, Kharkov. The premiere took place in Moscow, on November 30, 1893, played by Rachmaninoff himself alongside Pavel Pabst. The work was dedicated to Tchaikovsky, who intended to attend the work's premiere, but died five weeks prior. Its four movements alongside their respective poems are as follows:

1. Barcarolle. Allegretto, in G minor. After Mikhail Lermontov.
2. La nuit... L'amour... (The night...the love...). Adagio sostenuto, in D major. After Lord Byron. La Nuit et l’amour is an orchestral piece of 1888 by Augusta Holmes, which has a very similar opening motif.
3. Les Larmes (The Tears). Largo di molto, in G minor. After Fyodor Tyutchev.
4. Pâques (Easter). Allegro maestoso, in G minor. After Aleksey Khomyakov.

Rachmaninoff composed a second suite for two pianos in 1901. The Suite No. 1 was arranged for orchestra by Rebekah Harkness. A 1968 recording by Jorge Mester and the London Philharmonic Orchestra was released in 1994 on Citadel Records.
