= Master of Performance =

Postgraduate music degree

Master of Performance (often abbreviated to MPerf) is a postgraduate degree awarded by some conservatoires in the United Kingdom. Often offered alongside the more common Master of Music degree, the MPerf develops one's musical skills to a high professional level through intensive and specialised training. Students can specialise in instrumental, vocal or compositional study which is then augmented by advanced study in music theory, aural skills and professional development. The Royal College of Music sees its MPerf degree as a less intensive undertaking to its sister MMus degree, due to the lack of research modules in the former qualification whereas the MPerf degree at the Guildhall School of Music and Drama is more intensive than their MMus and requires an additional year of study.

The degree is currently offered by the Royal College of Music, the Guildhall School of Music and Drama and the Royal Northern College of Music.
