= Suite No. 2 (Rachmaninoff) =

Composition for two pianos by Sergei Rachmaninoff

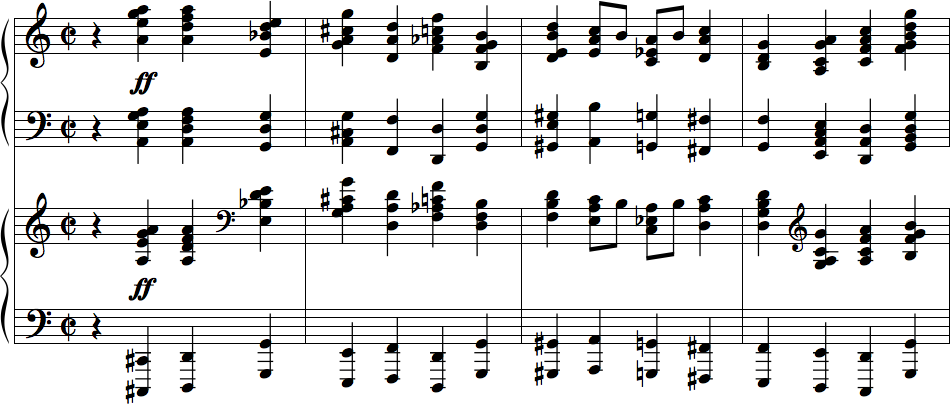
The first movement of Suite No. 2 is full of idiosyncratically large and thick chords.

Suite No. 2, Op. 17, is a composition for two pianos by Sergei Rachmaninoff, written in Italy in the first months of 1901. Alongside his Second Piano Concerto, Op. 18, it confirmed a return of creativity for the composer after four unproductive years caused by the negative critical reception of his First Symphony, Op. 13. The Suite was first performed on November 24 that year by the composer and his cousin Alexander Siloti.

In contrast to the First Suite for Two Pianos, the work is not based on literature, and its form tends to approach the traditional suite. The movements are:

1. Introduction (Alla marcia, in C major)
2. Valse (Presto, in G major)
3. Romance (Andantino, in A♭ major)
4. Tarantelle (Presto, in C minor)

In Los Angeles in the early 1940s, just before Rachmaninoff's death, he and Vladimir Horowitz were at a party and played the piece, the only time they ever did. The Suite No. 2 was arranged for piano and orchestra by Lee Hoiby. A 1968 performance by Lawrence Foster and the London Symphony Orchestra, with Lee Hoiby on piano, was released in 1994 by Citadel Records. An orchestration by David Stanhope has also been completed.

== Sources ==
- Bertensson, Sergei; Leyda, Jay (1956). Sergei Rachmaninoff: A Lifetime in Music. Indiana University Press. ISBN 0-253-33817-4..
