= Piano Concerto No. 2 (Rachmaninoff) =

1901 piano concerto by Sergei Rachmaninoff

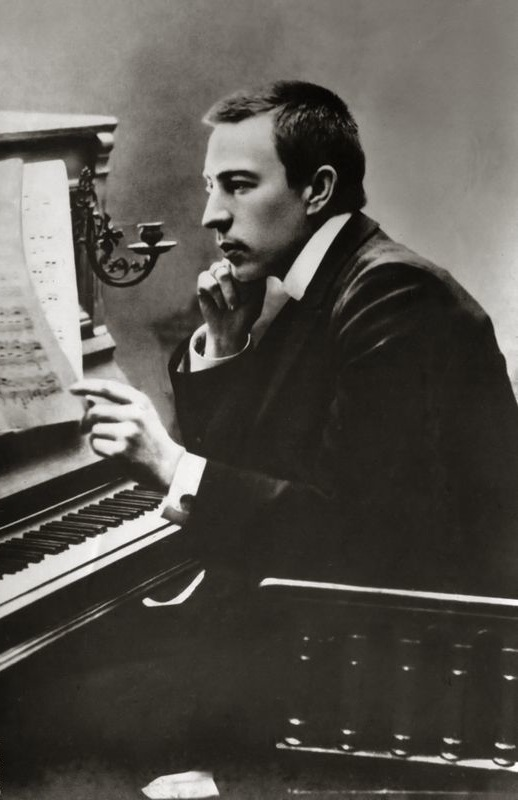
Rachmaninoff in the early 1900s

The Piano Concerto No. 2 in C minor, Op. 18, is a concerto for piano and orchestra composed by Sergei Rachmaninoff between June 1900 and April 1901. The piece established his fame as a concerto composer and is one of his most enduringly popular pieces.

After the failure of the premiere of his Symphony No. 1 (Op. 13) in March 1897, Rachmaninoff continued to compose some short pieces for piano, song and choral work while appearing in a number of concerts as an opera conductor. Just as he was finally beginning to recover from his ordeal, in January 1900, he had the opportunity to meet with the great Leo Tolstoy. However, he once again lost confidence after receiving harsh criticism for his original song "Fate" (Op. 21-1). After an unsuccessful meeting with Tolstoy meant to revoke his writer's block, relatives decided to introduce Rachmaninoff to the neurologist Nikolai Dahl. Between January and April 1900, Rachmaninoff underwent hypnotherapy and supportive therapy sessions with Dahl on a daily basis for over 3 months, specifically structured to improve his sleep patterns, mood, and appetite and reignite his desire to compose. That summer, Rachmaninoff felt that "new musical ideas began to stir" and successfully resumed composition.

In July 1900, Rachmaninoff finally composed the "Love Duet," a key scene in the opera Francesca da Rimini, which was to be completed in 1906. This song was written earlier than his Piano Concerto No. 2, which he began composing in the autumn of 1900, and the "Love Duet" became an important work that marked Rachmaninoff's rebirth as a composer.

He first worked on the second and third movements of the concerto, with the first movement causing him difficulties. Both movements of the unfinished concerto were first performed with him as soloist and his cousin Alexander Siloti conducting on 15 December [O.S. 2 December] 1900. The first movement was finished in 1901, and the complete work had an astoundingly successful premiere on 9 November [O.S. 27 October] 1901, again with the same duo. Gutheil published the concerto the same year.

Rachmaninoff dedicated the concerto to Dahl for successfully treating him by restoring his health and confidence in composition.

== History ==
=== Background ===
Sergei Rachmaninoff had been working on his First Symphony from January to September 1895. In 1896, after a long hiatus, the music publisher and philanthropist Mitrofan Belyayev agreed to include it at one of his Saint Petersburg Russian Symphony Concerts. However, there were setbacks: complaints were raised about the symphony by his teacher Sergei Taneyev upon receiving its score, which elicited revisions by Rachmaninoff, and Nikolai Rimsky-Korsakov expressed dissatisfaction during rehearsal. Eventually, the symphony was scheduled to be premiered in March 1897. Before the due date, he was nervous but optimistic due to his prior successes, which included winning the Moscow Conservatory Great Gold Medal and earning the praise of Pyotr Ilyich Tchaikovsky. The premiere, however, was a disaster; Rachmaninoff listened to the cacophonous performance backstage to avoid getting humiliated by the audience and eventually left the hall when the piece finished. The symphony was brutally panned by critics, and apart from issues with the piece, the poor performance of the possibly drunk conductor, Alexander Glazunov, was also to blame. (Note: Another major factor was a deep-seated antipathy between composers from Moscow and Saint Petersburg.) César Cui wrote:

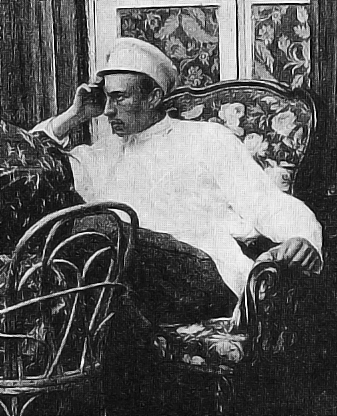
Rachmaninoff in 1897, after the premiere of his First Symphony

If there were a conservatoire in Hell, if one of its talented students were instructed to write a programme symphony on "The Seven Plagues of Egypt", and if he were to compose a symphony like Mr Rachmaninoff's, then he would have fulfilled his task brilliantly and delighted the inmates of Hell. (Note: Cited from Cui, César (1897) in "Novosti i birzhevaya gazeta", p. 3.)

Rachmaninoff initially remained aloof to the failure of his symphony, but upon reflection, suffered a psychological breakdown that stopped his compositional output for three years. He adopted a lifestyle of heavy drinking to forget about his problems. Depression consumed him, and although he rarely composed, he still engaged in performance, accepting a conducting position by the Russian entrepreneur Savva Mamontov at the Moscow Private Russian Opera from 1897 to 1898. It provided income for the cash-strapped Rachmaninoff; he eventually left as it didn't allow time for other activities and due to the incompetence of the theater, which turned piano lessons into his main source of income.

At the end of 1898, Rachmaninoff was invited to perform in London in April 1899, where he was expected to play his Second Piano Concerto. However, he wrote to the London Philharmonic Society that he couldn't finish a second concerto due to illness. (Note: According to So-Ham Kim Chung, the illness was "severe mental depression".) The society requested he play his First Piano Concerto, but he declined, dismissing it as a student piece. Instead, he offered to conduct one of his orchestral pieces, to which the society agreed, provided he also performed at the piano. He made a successful conducting debut, performing The Rock and playing piano pieces such as his popular Prelude in C-sharp minor. The society secretary, Francesco Berger invited him to return next year with a performance of the First Concerto. However, he promised to return with a newer and better one, although he did not perform it there until 1908. Aleksandr Goldenweiser, a peer from the same conservatory, wanted to play his new concerto at a Belyayev concert in Saint Petersburg, thinking its consummation was inevitable. Rachmaninoff, who had thoughts of composing it three years earlier, sent a letter to him stating that nothing had been penned so far.

For the rest of the summer and autumn of 1899, Rachmaninoff's unproductiveness worsened his depression. A friend of the Satins (relatives of Rachmaninoff), in an attempt to revoke the depressed composer's writer's block, suggested he visit Leo Tolstoy. (Note: Max Harrison notes that it is not certain whether there were one or two visits, as Rachmaninoff's accounts are inconsistent.) However, his visit to the querulous author only increased his despondency, and he became so self-critical that he was rendered unable to compose. The Satins, anxious about his well-being, persuaded him to visit Nikolai Dahl, a neurologist who specialized in hypnosis, with whom they had a good experience. Desperate, he agreed without hesitation. From January to April 1900, he treated him daily free of charge using hypnotherapy. Dahl restored Rachmaninoff's health and his confidence to compose. Himself a musician, Dahl engaged in lengthy conversations surrounding music with Rachmaninoff, and would repeat a triptych formula while the composer was half-asleep: "You will begin to write your concerto ... You will work with great facility ... The concerto will be of an excellent quality". Even though the results were not readily evident, they were still successful.

=== Composition and premiere ===
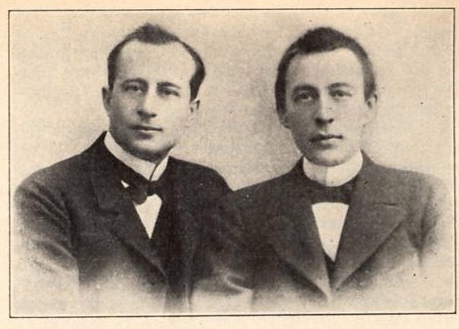
Alexander Siloti (left) with Rachmaninoff (right)

In June 1900, after receiving an invitation to perform Mefistofele in La Scala, Feodor Chaliapin invited Rachmaninoff to live with him in Italy, where he sought his advice while studying the opera. During his stay, Rachmaninoff composed the love duet of his opera Francesca da Rimini and also began working on the second and third movements of his Second Piano Concerto. With newfound enthusiasm for composition, he resumed working on them after returning to Russia, which for the rest of the summer and the autumn were being finished "quickly and easily", although the first movement caused him difficulties. (Note: Barrie Martyn formulates that Rachmaninoff might have rudimentarily written or thought out the first movement prior to the rest and that, according to Goldenweiser, the first movement existed in multiple variants, and Rachmaninoff's indecisiveness to opt for one made him perform the concerto unfinished. Max Harrison states the opposite, namely that the last two movements were composed first.) He told his biographer Oskar von Riesemann that "the material grew in bulk, and new musical ideas began to stir within me—far more than I needed for my concerto". (Note: Cited from Riesemann, Oskar von (1970) [1934]. Rachmaninoff's Recollections, Told to Oskar von Riesemann. New York: Macmillan. p. 112. ISBN 978-0-83695-232-2.)

The two finished movements were to be performed in the Moscow Nobility Hall on 15 December [O.S. 2 December] at a concert arranged for the benefit of the Ladies' Charity Prison Committee. On the eve of the concert, Rachmaninoff caught a cold, prompting his friends and relatives to stuff him with remedies, filling him with an excess of mulled wine; he didn't want to admit his desire to cancel the performance. With him as soloist with an orchestra after an eight-year hiatus and his cousin Alexander Siloti making his conducting debut, it was an anxious event, but the concert was a great success, easing the worries of his close ones. Ivan Lipaev wrote: "it's been long since the walls of the Nobility Hall reverberated with such enthusiastic, storming applause as on that evening ... This work contains much poetry, beauty, warmth, rich orchestration, healthy and buoyant creative power. Rachmaninoff's talent is evident throughout." The German company Gutheil published the concerto as opus number 18 the following year. (Note: The concerto was published before his Suite No. 2. Despite that, the suite received the opus number 17, reversing the order.)

Before continuing composition, Rachmaninoff received financial aid from Siloti to tide him over for the next three years, securing his ability to compose without worrying about rent. By April 1901, while staying with Goldenweiser, he finished the first movement of the concerto and subsequently premiered the full work at a Moscow Philharmonic Society concert on 9 November [O.S. 27 October], again with him at the piano and Siloti conducting. Five days before the premiere, however, Rachmaninoff received a letter from Nikita Morozov (his Conservatory colleague) pestering him regarding the structure of the concerto after receiving its score, commenting that the first subject seemed like an introduction to the second one. Frantic, he replied, writing that he concurred with his opinion and was pondering over the first movement. Regardless, it was an astounding success, and Rachmaninoff enjoyed wild acclaim. Even Cui, who previously scolded his First Symphony, displayed exuberance over the work in a letter from 1903. The piece established Rachmaninoff's fame as a concerto composer and is one of his most enduringly popular pieces. He dedicated it to Dahl for his treatment.

=== Subsequent performances ===
The popularity of the Second Piano Concerto grew rapidly, developing global fame after its subsequent performances. Its international progress started with a performance in Germany, where Siloti played it with the Leipzig Gewandhaus Orchestra under Arthur Nikisch's baton in January 1902. In March, the same duo had a tremendously successful performance in Saint Petersburg; two days preceding this, the Rachmaninoff-Siloti duo performed back in Moscow, with the former conducting and the latter as soloist. May of the same year saw a performance at the Queen's Hall in London, the soloist being Wassily Sapellnikoff with the Philharmonic Society and Frederic Cowen conducting; London would wait until 1908 for Rachmaninoff to perform it there. "One was quickly persuaded of its genuine excellence and originality", The Guardian wrote of the concerto following the performance. England, however, had already heard the work twice prior to the London premiere, with performances by Siloti in Birmingham and Manchester. Rachmaninoff—enhanced by success from repossessing the ability to compose again, coupled with no more financial worries—repaid the loan from Siloti within one year of receiving the last installment.

After marrying his first cousin Natalia Satina, the newly-wed Rachmaninoff received an invitation to play his concerto with the Vienna Philharmonic under the direction of Vasily Safonov in December. Although the engagement guaranteed him a hefty fee, he was anxious that accepting it would show ingratitude towards Siloti. However, after seeking his help, Taneyev reassured Rachmaninoff that this did not offend Siloti. That was followed by concerts in both Vienna and Prague the following spring in 1903 under the same engagement. In late 1904, Rachmaninoff won the Glinka Awards, cash prizes established in Belyayev's will, receiving 500 rubles for his concerto. Throughout his life, Rachmaninoff soloed the concerto a total of 143 times.

=== Early reception ===
After he fulfilled his 1908 London concert engagement at the Queen's Hall under Serge Koussevitzky, a flattering review by The Times emerged: "The direct expression of the work, the extraordinary precision and exactitude of Rachmaninoff's playing, and even the strict economy of movement of arms and hands which he exercises, all contributed to the impression of completeness of performance."

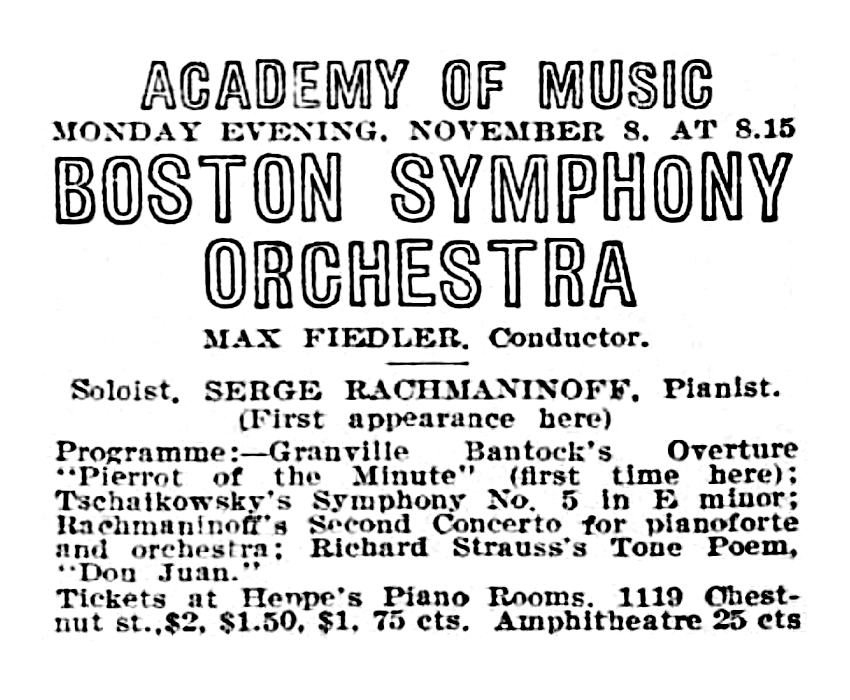
An advertisement for Rachmaninoff's debut with an American orchestra at the Philadelphia Academy of Music, where he gave the US premiere of his concerto

His debut with an American orchestra occurred on 8 November 1909, performing the concerto at the Philadelphia Academy of Music with the Boston Symphony Orchestra under Max Fiedler's baton, including repeat performances in Baltimore and New York City. Critics since the first performance were chiefly dismissive, echoing Philip Hale's program notes for the debut stating that "The concerto is of uneven worth. The first movement is labored and has little marked character. It might have been written by any German, technically well-trained, who was acquainted with the music of Tchaikovsky". (Note: Following a performance at the Paris Opera in 1907, a similar objection emerged, where, in spite of winning the praise of the Parisian concertgoers, French critics considered the concerto to be more Germanic rather than Russian.) Richard Aldrich, who was a music critic for The New York Times, murmured about the overperformance of the work in proportion to its worth, but complimented Rachmaninoff's playing, stating that, with the assistance of the orchestra, "he made it sound more interesting than it ever has before here". His last concert during the American tour was on 27 January 1910, performing the Isle of the Dead and his concerto under Modest Altschuler with his Russian Symphony Society, who farewelled the homesick Rachmaninoff with appraisal of his Isle of the Dead but dismissal of the concerto as "not in any way comparable to Rachmaninoff's third concerto". Rachmaninoff played the concerto eight times during the tour. Despite the concerto's popularity, its critical reception has often remained poor.

Following the 1917 October Revolution, Rachmaninoff and his family escaped Russia, never to return, seeing the US as a haven for remedying his financial situation; they arrived there one day before Armistice Day, following their temporary stay in Scandinavia. Reginald De Koven praised a Rachmaninoff concerto performance under Walter Damrosch, writing that he rarely saw a New York audience "more moved, excited and wrought up". A 1927 Liverpool Post article called the concerto a "somewhat catchpenny work though it had plenty of rather cheap glitter". Rachmaninoff's last performance of the Piano Concerto No. 2 was on 18 June 1942 with Vladimir Bakaleinikov leading the Los Angeles Philharmonic at the Hollywood Bowl. Reviewing the performance in Los Angeles Evening Citizen News, Richard D. Saunders opined that the work is of a "songful quality, imbued with haunting melodies all tinged with sombre pathos and expressed with the graceful refinement characteristic of the composer".

=== Modern reception and legacy ===
No other concerto by Rachmaninoff was as popular with audiences and pianists alike as his Second Concerto; the musicologist Glen Carruthers attributes this popularity with "memorable melodies [which] appear in each movement". Rachmaninoff's biographer Geoffrey Norris characterized the concerto as "notable for its conciseness and for its lyrical themes, which are just sufficiently contrasted to ensure that they are not spoilt either by overabundance or overexposure." Stephen Hough in an article with The Guardian posits that the composition is "his most popular, most often performed and, arguably, the most perfect structurally. It sounds as if it wrote itself, so naturally does the music flow". Another article by John Ezard and David Ward calls it one of the "most often performed concertos in the repertoire. Its emergence – in each year so far of the new century – as the British classical listening public's favourite tune indicates Rachmaninov's position as perhaps the most popular mainstream composer of the last 70 years." In 2023, 2024 and 2025, the piece was voted number one in the Classic FM annual Hall of Fame poll and has consistently ranked in the top three.

Many films—such as William Dieterle's September Affair (1950), Charles Vidor's Rhapsody (1954), and Billy Wilder's The Seven Year Itch (1955)—borrow themes from the concerto. David Lean's romantic drama Brief Encounter (1945) utilizes the music widely in its soundtrack, and Frank Borzage's I've Always Loved You (1946) features it heavily; this has further popularized the work. Steve Pemberton and Reece Shearsmith's Inside No. 9 heavily utilized its soundtrack in the episode "A Quiet Night In", with almost the entire episode being devoid of speech, and the audio almost entirely following the concertos soundtrack. The concerto has also inspired numerous songs (Note: For examples, see § Transcriptions and derivative works) and is frequently used in figure skating programmes.

== Instrumentation ==
The concerto is scored for piano and orchestra:

Woodwinds:

2 flutes
2 oboes
2 clarinets in B♭ (in the first and third movements) and A (in the second and third movements)
2 bassoons

Brass:

4 horns in F
2 trumpets in B♭
3 trombones (2 tenor, 1 bass)
1 tuba

Percussion:

timpani

bass drum
cymbals

Strings:

1st violins
2nd violins
violas
cellos
double basses

== Structure ==
1. Moderato

2. Adagio sostenuto

3. Allegro scherzando
Performed by Sviatoslav Richter and the Warsaw National Philharmonic Orchestra under Stanisław Wisłocki, 1959.

The piece is written in three-movement concerto form:

1. Moderato (C minor)
2. Adagio sostenuto – Più animato – Tempo I (C minor → E major)
3. Allegro scherzando (E major → C minor → C major)

=== I. Moderato ===
First eight bars of the concerto

The opening movement begins with a series of chromatic bell-like tollings on the piano that build tension, eventually climaxing in the introduction of the main theme by the violins, violas, and first clarinet. The piano starts to play very low notes during the theme introduced by the strings and clarinet.

In this first section, while the melody is stated by the orchestra, the piano takes on the role of accompaniment, consisting of rapid oscillating arpeggios between both hands which contribute to the fullness and texture of the section's sound. The theme soon goes into a slightly lower register, where it is carried on by the cello section, and then is joined by the violins and violas, soaring to a climactic C note. After the statement of the long first theme, a quick and virtuosic "piu mosso" pianistic figuration transition leads into a short series of authentic cadences, accompanied by both a crescendo and an accelerando; this then progresses into the gentle, lyrical second theme in E♭ major, the relative key. The second theme is first stated by the solo piano, with light accompaniment coming from the upper wind instruments. A transition which follows the chromatic scale eventually leads to the final reinstatement of the second theme, this time with the full orchestra at a piano dynamic. The exposition ends with an agitated closing section with scaling arpeggios on the E♭ major scale in both hands.

The agitated and unstable development borrows motifs from both themes, changing keys very often and giving the melody to different instruments while a new musical idea is slowly formed. The sound here, while focused on a particular tonality, has ideas of chromaticism. Two sequences of pianistic figurations lead to a placid, orchestral reinstatement of the first theme in the dominant 7th key of G. The development furthers with motifs from the previous themes, climaxing towards a B♭ major "più vivo" section. A triplet arpeggio section leads into the accelerando section, with the accompanying piano playing chords in both hands, and the string section providing the melody reminiscent of the second theme. The piece reaches a climax with the piano playing dissonant fortississimo (fff) chords, and with the horns and trumpets providing the syncopated melody.

While the orchestra restates the first theme, the piano, that on the other occasion had an accompaniment role, now plays the march-like theme that had been halfly presented in the development, thus making a considerable readjustment in the exposition, as in the main theme, the arpeggios in the piano serve as an accompaniment. This is followed by a piano-solo which continues the first theme and leads into a descending chromatic passage to a pianississimo A♭ major chord. Then the second theme is heard played with a horn solo. The entrance of the piano reverts the key back into C minor, with triplet passages played over a mysterious theme played by the orchestra. Briefly, the piece transitions to a C major arpeggio in the piano, and is placid until drawn into the closing section based on the first subject, marked Meno mosso, in which the movement ends in a C minor fortissimo, with the same authentic cadence as those that followed the first statement of the first theme in the exposition.

=== II. Adagio sostenuto ===
The second movement opens with a series of slow chords in the strings which modulate from the C minor of the previous movement to the E major of this movement.

At the beginning of the A section, the piano enters, playing a simple arpeggiated figure. This opening piano figure was composed in 1891 as the opening of the Romance from Two Pieces For Six Hands. The main theme is initially introduced by the flute, before being developed by an extensive clarinet solo. The motif is passed between the piano and then the strings.

Then the B section is heard. It builds up to a short climax centered on the piano, which leads to a cadenza for the piano.

The original theme is repeated with various inversions of chords and lower arpeggios on the piano. The orchestra mainly plays very legato and sweet, however the flutes play staccato chords for most of the ending. After a climactic phrase with piano and strings together, the music starts to die away losing more instruments and focusing more on the piano over time, slowly descending to a finish with just the soloist in E major.

=== III. Allegro scherzando ===
The last movement opens with a short orchestral introduction that modulates from E major (the key of the previous movement) to C minor, before a piano solo leads to the statement of the agitated first theme.

After the original fast tempo and musical drama ends, a short transition from the piano solo leads to the oboe and violas introducing a second lyrical theme in B♭ major. This theme maintains the motif of the first movement's second theme. The exposition ends with a suspenseful closing section in B♭ major.

After that an extended and energetic development section is heard. The development is based on the first theme of the exposition. It maintains a very improvisational quality, as instruments take turns playing the stormy motifs.

In the recapitulation, the first theme is truncated to only 8 bars on the tutti, because it was widely used in the development section. After the transition, the recapitulation's 2nd theme appears, this time in D♭ major, half above the tonic. However, after the ominous closing section ends it then builds up into a triumphant climax in C major from the beginning of the coda. The movement ends very triumphantly in the tonic major with the same four-note rhythm ending the Third Concerto in D minor.

== Recordings ==
Commercial recordings include:

- 1929: Sergei Rachmaninoff with Philadelphia Orchestra conducted by Leopold Stokowski
- 1956: Arthur Rubinstein with Chicago Symphony Orchestra conducted by Fritz Reiner
- 1959: Sviatoslav Richter with Warsaw Philharmonic Orchestra conducted by Stanisław Wisłocki
- 1962: Van Cliburn with Chicago Symphony Orchestra conducted by Fritz Reiner
- 1965: Earl Wild with Royal Philharmonic Orchestra conducted by Jascha Horenstein
- 1970: Alexis Weissenberg with Berlin Philharmonic conducted by Herbert von Karajan
- 1971: Vladimir Ashkenazy with London Symphony Orchestra conducted by André Previn
- 1988: Evgeny Kissin with London Symphony Orchestra conducted by Valery Gergiev
- 2003: Krystian Zimerman with Boston Symphony Orchestra conducted by Seiji Ozawa
- 2004: Stephen Hough with Dallas Symphony Orchestra conducted by Andrew Litton
- 2005: Leif Ove Andsnes with Berlin Philharmonic conducted by Antonio Pappano
- 2011: Yuja Wang with Verbier Festival Orchestra conducted by Yuri Temirkanov
- 2012: Valentina Lisitsa with London Symphony Orchestra conducted by Michael Francis
- 2013: Anna Fedorova with Nordwestdeutsche Philharmonie conducted by Martin Panteleev
- 2017: Khatia Buniatishvili with the Czech Philharmonic conducted by Paavo Järvi
- 2018: Daniil Trifonov with Philadelphia Orchestra conducted by Yannick Nézet-Séguin
- 2023: Yuja Wang with Los Angeles Philharmonic conducted by Gustavo Dudamel

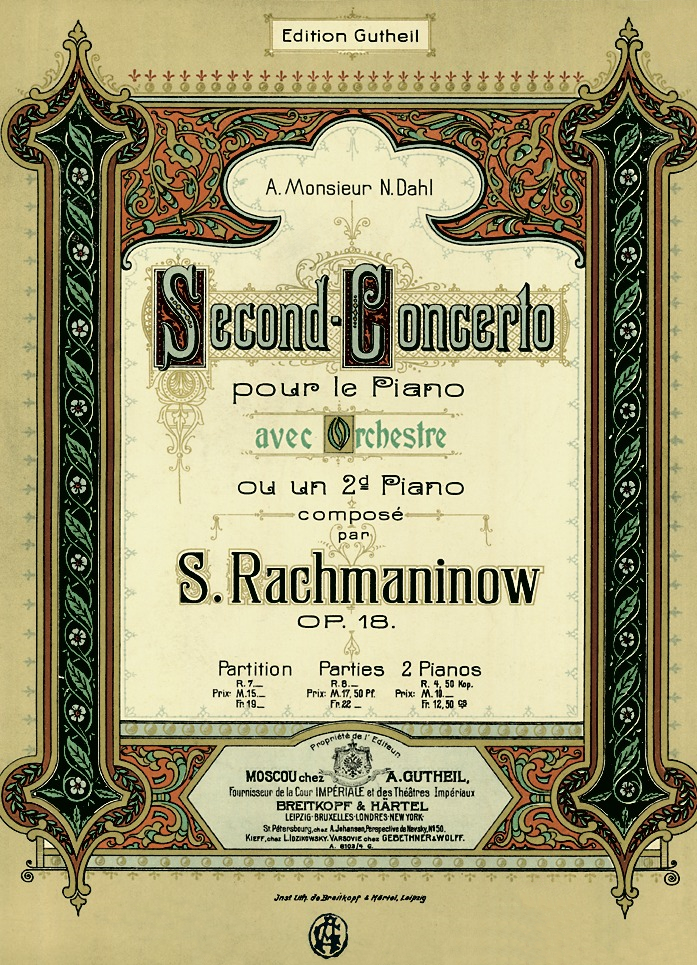
Score cover of the concerto arranged for 2 pianos by the composer

== Transcriptions and derivative works ==
In 1901, Gutheil published the concerto along with the composer's two-piano arrangement. The Austrian violinist and composer Fritz Kreisler transcribed the second movement for violin and piano in 1940, named Preghiera (Prayer). In 1946, Percy Grainger made a concert transcription of the third movement for piano solo. (Note: The transcription is catalogued under Concert Transcriptions of Favourite Concertos for piano solo (CT).) The Classical Jazz Quartet's 2006 arrangement uses thematic sections derived from each movement as grounds for jazz improvisation.

Two songs recorded by Frank Sinatra have roots in the concerto: "I Think of You", from the second theme of the first movement, and "Full Moon and Empty Arms", from the second theme of the third movement. Eric Carmen's 1975 ballad "All by Myself" is based on the second movement.

The English rock band Muse have interpolated elements of the Moderato movement within their 2001 song "Space Dementia", and incorporated musical elements of the Adagio movement within their 2004 song "Butterflies and Hurricanes", and their 2012 song "Explorers" from 'The 2nd Law'.
