= Nikolai Dahl =

Russian physician (1860 – 1939)

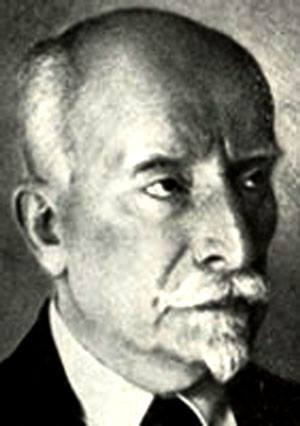
- A portrait of Nikolai Vladimirovich Dahl
- Born: July 17, 1860
- Died: 1939 (aged 78–79)
- Education: Moscow State University
- Occupation: Physician
- Known for: Treating Sergei Rachmaninoff

Nikolai Vladimirovich Dahl, often called Nicolai Dahl (Russian: Николай Владимирович Даль) (July 17, 1860 – 1939) was a Russian physician. He is most notable for his successful treatment of the composer Sergei Rachmaninoff, who was suffering a creative block after the disastrous premiere of his First Symphony. Among his other notable patients were Chaliapin, Scriabin, and Stanislavsky.

== Early life and education ==
Dahl was born in 1860, and graduated from the Moscow University in 1887. He studied in France with Jean-Martin Charcot, who initiated a therapy by hypnotizing his patients.

== Career ==
Dahl had a private practice in Moscow. His speciality was in the fields of neurology, psychiatry and psychology. Dahl was interested in music and he was a competent amateur viola player.

Dahl is best known for treating the composer Sergei Rachmaninoff. The composer had a nervous breakdown because of poor critical reviews of his Symphony No. 1 in 1897 and went into a creative block. Although he continued his career as a pianist and conductor, he found himself unable to compose music. In January 1900 Dahl commenced a treatment program for Rachmaninoff which lasted daily for more than three months, using hypnotherapy and supportive therapy since psychotherapy as started by Freud had yet to be invented. Dahl's treatment, helped by support from Rachmaninoff's own family and friends, cured the composer, who dedicated his Piano Concerto No. 2 (1901) to Dahl.

Dahl emigrated from the Soviet Union in 1925 and settled in Beirut, Lebanon. He played the viola in the orchestra of the American University of Beirut. On one occasion, Rachmaninoff's 2nd Piano Concerto was performed, with Arkadie Kouguell as soloist and conductor. The audience were informed that the dedicatee of the concerto, Dahl, was a member of the viola section of the orchestra, and they asked him to rise and take a bow. He died in Beirut in 1939.

Dahl and Rachmaninoff's relationship was dramatized in the 2015 Off-Broadway musical Preludes by Dave Malloy at Lincoln Center Theater.
