= Performing arts in Louisville, Kentucky =

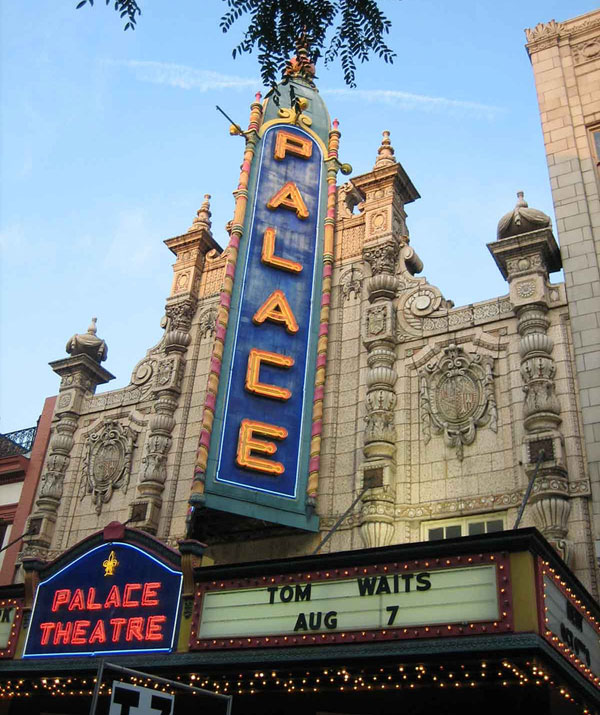
Front view of The Louisville Palace with marquee reading "Tom Waits August 7"

The performing arts community in Louisville, Kentucky is undergoing a renaissance. The Kentucky Center, dedicated in 1983, located in the downtown hotel and entertainment district, is a premiere performing arts center. It features a variety of plays and concerts, and is the performance home of the Louisville Ballet, Louisville Orchestra, Broadway Across America - Louisville, Music Theatre Louisville, Stage One, KentuckyShow! and the Kentucky Opera, which is the twelfth oldest opera in the United States. The center also manages the historic W. L. Lyons Brown Theatre, which opened in 1925 and is patterned after New York's acclaimed Music Box Theatre.

Actors Theatre of Louisville is another performing arts center that has become the cornerstone of the revitalization of Louisville's Main Street. As the centerpiece of the city's urban cultural district, Actors Theatre had significant economic impact on a vital downtown life.

The Palace Theatre is an ornate theatre in downtown Louisville's theatre district. The theatre shows popular movies, old and new, as well as concerts by popular artists. Located nearby is the Kentucky Theater, which was built in 1921 and operated for 60 years as a movie house, but was closed and was almost demolished in 1986. Ultimately it was saved by local arts advocates, and the newly renovated Kentucky Theater opened its doors in 2000 and has become a community arts center and art film house.

Iroquois Park is the home of the renovated Iroquois Amphitheater which hosts a variety of musical concerts in a partially covered outdoor setting. Up through 2008, it also hosted the musical productions of Music Theatre Louisville, which moved to the Kentucky Center in 2009.

The Jewish Community Center of Louisville is home to Center Stage, whose members have performed some of Broadway's best musicals. The shows range from new, hip, modern music all the way to Rodgers and Hammerstein classics. In the 2008 Season, they are introducing straight plays to their stage again with the first part of Angels in America.

Louisville is home to an active indie music scene with notable bands like Love Jones, Flaw, Slint, My Morning Jacket, Wax Fang, VHS or Beta and The Villebillies. It is also home to the post-grunge band Days of the New.

On Fourth Street in downtown is the Fourth Street Live! outdoor entertainment complex, which features a wide variety of restaurants, stores and nightclubs. The complex sponsors many free concerts, as does the popular Waterfront Park.

The large performing arts community played a role in the relocation of ZFX Inc, the second-largest theatrical flying special effects company in the world, from Las Vegas to Louisville in 2006.

== See also ==
- Fund for the Arts
- List of attractions and events in the Louisville metropolitan area
- Theater in Kentucky
- Theatres of Louisville
