= List of theatres in Louisville, Kentucky =

As with all older American cities, Louisville, Kentucky, has several generations of theatres, spanning from live stage theatres to large ornate downtown theatres to standalone neighborhood theatres to modern multiplexes. A great deal of the older theatres have been razed, or their buildings converted to other purposes.

"Years active" refers to years the building was actively used as a theatre. Due to renumbering and consolidation over the years, the address given may not exactly correspond to the modern building or lot at that location.

Name	Years	Address	Notes
Actors Theatre of Louisville	1964 –	316 W Main St	
Alamo Theatre	1914 – 1940	444 S. Fourth St.	Razed. Also called the Ohio (different from the later one on 4th St.)
Alpha 1 Theatre		Kmart Plaza 4921 Dixie Hwy.	Later became Dixie 4. Still standing. Remodeled into what is now Feeder's Supply and RentACenter
Alpha 2 Theatre		Indian Trail Square	Preston Highway. Still standing. Remodeled into what is now Sporting Goods Store and phone store
Alpha 3 Theatre	?-1982	Holiday Manor	US42. Still Standing. Remodeled into restaurant and later store space.
Alpha 4 Theatre		9202 Westport Rd.	Still standing. Converted into an AutoZone store.
Aristo Theatre		1603 S. Second St.	Razed. Also known as The Ritz and The New Ritz
Avenue Theatre			Razed
Bard Theatre	1941-?	2470 Bardstown Road	Razed in 1998. (After closing as a movie theater, the former Bard was converted to a nightclub called Armando's Palace, and then later, after significant remodeling, became a health club that operated on two stories, and included a small pool and indoor track.)
Baxter Avenue Theatre also (later) the Airway			Apex Theatres. Located in Mid City Mall. Eight screens.
Baxter Theatre (later the Airway)		1055 Bardstown Rd.	Building still stands, after a brief period as a youth center, part of back auditorium was razed and interior gutted, theatre converted to a restaurant/sports bar. Theatre originally called The Lincoln when first opened. Called The Airway in the 1950s. Now a restaurant.
Bijou		211 S. Fourth	Razed; Also called The Columbia
Bijou		104 E. Liberty	Razed; Also called The Liberty
Bijou		1230 W. Walnut	Razed; Also called The Olio and The Victory
Broadway Cinemas	1999–2004	1211 W Broadway	Converted from a Winn-Dixie building into 10-screen complex. It was an effort to bring a theater back to the predominantly black West End, after the last of 6 area theaters, Cinema West, closed in 1975. Broadway Cinemas failed due to slow ticket sales and trouble with its creditors. The building was converted again into retail space.
Broadway Theatre (later, Guild Theatre, Mad Hatter Concert Hall, O.R.I. Office Furniture, Launch Louisville)	1915–1960 1960-1969 (Guild) 1969-1980 (Mad Hatter) 1981-2014 (ORI Office) 2018–Present (Launch Louisville)	816 E. Broadway	Originally legitimate theatre, vaudeville, burlesque, and cinema. Renowned for acoustics. Later featured radio performances by a then unknown Gene Autry. Renamed Guild Theatre in 1960, featuring independent play companies. Converted to rock music venue The Mad Hatter in 1969. Building converted to retail/showroom space for an office furniture company in 1981. In 2018, converted to current entrepreneurial/coworking space, Launch Louisville.
Brown Theatre	1925-	317 W. Broadway	Stopped showing films in 1962. Currently operating as a concert/live performance venue in conjunction with The Kentucky Center. Now called the W. L. Lyons Brown Theatre.
Buckingham also known (at times) as the Savoy and Grand Opera House	1820–1897 (operated as the Savoy until ca. 1989.)	223-27 W. Jefferson	Razed; Burlesque. Owned by John Henry Whallen.
Bunbury Theatre Company	1985–present	604 South Third Street/ The Henry Clay Building	Performing at The Bunbury Theatre, the company renovated the space in 2007. 144-seat theatre.
Capitol Theatre		2129 S. Preston	Neighborhood theatre. Building later converted to retail space. Around 850 seats.
Carriage House		1101 S. Fourth St.	Razed.
Casino		317 S. Fourth St.	No longer exists.
Cherokee Blues Club	1989–1994	1589 Bardstown Rd.	In the late 1980s it was converted into a nightclub called The Cherokee Blues Club. It was a well-known spot frequented by popular blues artists and hailed as the 'real-deal' for blues clubs. Capacity issues and neighborhood noise complaints led to the club closing in 1994 and re-opened under new management at another location. The original spot was never a theater, and the second location occupied the former space of a Louisville legend, 'Tewligan's'. The second spot is now a club called Cahoots. The original location is now a consignment shop.
Cherokee		326 W. Market	Razed. Stood where the Kentucky International Convention Center now stands.
Cinema West	?-1975	3312 W. Broadway	Last theater in the West End until the short-lived Broadway Cinemas from 1999 to 2004.
Clifton		2003-5 Frankfort Ave.	Closed. (before 2015)
Colonial		1801 W. Market	Razed. Now an empty lot.
Cozy Theatre	?-1965	3105 S. Third St.	450 seats. Closed in 1965. Razed.
Crescent Theatre (also called the Masonic)	1926-?	2862 Frankfort Ave.	Closed. Also called The Masonic. Art theatre in the 1960s, became a porn theatre before closing. Building eventually became the Brasserie Deitrich restaurant, which opened in 1988 and closed in May 2003. In 2004 the property was purchased by investors to be turned into condos.
Crescent Air Dome		2322 Frankfort Ave.	Closed.
Crown Theatre		1215 S. Seventh Street	Closed. Current home of B.C. Plumbing.
Crystal		456 S. Fourth St	Razed. (within modern day Fourth Street Live)
Crystal		314 W. Market	May now be Actor's Theatre of Louisville Rehearsal Hall
Dixie 4		4921 Dixie Hwy	Originally the Alpha 1 Theatre. Later sold and became Dixie 4. Currently the site of Feeder's Supply and Rent-a-Center.
Dixie Dozen Cinemas	1993–2013	6801 Dixie Hwy	Republic Theatres. Originally owned by Associated Theatres. 12 screens.
Dixie Drive-In Theatre	?-1966	4915 Dixie Hwy (now Kroger)	Closed. Pleasure Ridge Park area.
Dixie Theater		941 S. Preston	Closed. Also called The New Dixie. One of four theatres open to blacks before desegregation.
Downs		3423 Taylor Blvd.	Razed; First called The Aljo
Dreamland	1904-?	444 W. Market	Closed.
East Drive-In Theatre	1948–1966	Shelbyville Rd	Also called: Drive-In Theatre. Razed. Outdoor. Sat on the site of what is today “The Best Buy Center”
Gayety	1910–1936	323 W. Jefferson St.	Razed; Burlesque
Globe	1880-	2010 Portland Ave.	Once a Vaudeville Theater, renamed Nelligan Hall in the 1930s and adopted as area Democratic Campaign Headquarters and home to the North End Social Club. Artists have recently renovated into an artists' studio/gallery/performance space.
Grand Theater		607-11 W. Walnut St.	Closed. One of four theatres open to blacks before desegregation.
Highland		1014-16 Bardstown Rd.	Later called Shibboleth Hall
Highland Amusement Co.		919 Baxter Ave.	Later became the Gem. Closed. The building appears to have changed hands numerous times between 2007 and 2014 as seen on Google Streetview. It is now DiOrio's Pizza and Pub.
Highland Park	1924-?	4506 Park Blvd.	Razed; First called Hi-Land/New Superba. Highland Park
Hilltop Theatre	1920-?	1757 Frankfort Ave.	First theatre in Louisville's east end. Building still stands, currently retail/warehouse space for a novelty company.
Hippodrome Theater	1920-1941/3	144-146 W. Market St	"Located on the corner of S. 2nd Street and W. Market Street. The Hippodrome Theater was opened prior to 1913. It was listed as (Closed) in 1941 & 1943."
Hopkins	ante 1895-?	133 W. Market St.	Closed.
Ideal Theatre	1912-?	2315 W. Market St.	Razed sometime after 1983. Listed individually on National Register of Historic Places.
J-Town 4	1971-1998	9601 Taylorsville Rd	
Kentucky Theater	1921-	649-651 S Fourth St.	Theater had been recently operating as a live performance/concert venue, with occasional film presentations, but is currently closed. Designed by Louisville firm Joseph & Joseph, original interior included Italian marble and chandeliers from Czechoslovakia.
Kenwood Drive-In	1949–2009	7001 Southside Dr	Closed January 2009 by National Amusements.
Knox Theatre		311 W Oak St	Also called the Tower Theatre. Theatre razed, front entrance still stands.
Lakewood Drive-In Theatre		Highway 3 & Highway 62	Closed
Lincoln Theater			Closed (ALSO SEE: Baxter Theatre 1055 Bardstown Road)
Louisville Science Center IMAX Theatre	1988-	727 W Main St	Located in the upper floors of the Kentucky Science Center.
Lyric Theater	1926-?	604 W. Walnut Street [1]	Closed. One of four theatres open to blacks before desegregation. In 2003, proposed to have its name live on as a youth center to be called the Grand Lyric Theatre. Closed by the late 1980s, part of the Walnut Street corridor, a center of a black-owned businesses and entertainment venues.
Macauley's Theatre	1873–1925		Razed in 1925
Majestic Theatre			Majestic Theatre Downtown Palace, 544 S. Fourth Street 1908-1929
Mall St. Matthews	2013-	5000 Shelbyville Road	Cinemark Theaters
Mary Anderson Theatre		612 S. 4th Street	Closed in the 1970s. 1405 seats. Named for Mary Anderson. Theatre was gutted in the late 1980s and converted into office space. Designed by William J. Dodd and Kenneth McDonald.
Masonic 318 W. Chestnut. Downtown theatre also known as the Shubert and the Strand	Movie City	9070 Dixie Hwy	
National Theatre (also known as B. F. Keith Theatre)	1913–1952	500 W. Muhammad Ali Boulevard	Razed in 1953
New Superba Theatre			Razed
Norman Movie Theatre	Years active 1911 to 1962	2051 Portland Ave.	Was previously a vaudeville theatre. Established and run by the Wentzell family of the Portland neighborhood.
Oak Theatre		Dixie Highway & Oak Street	Razed
Ohio Theatre	1941-	655 S. 4th Street	Razed, facade and front entrance still stands, converted to retail space. Art Deco style.
Orpheum Theatre(Also known as the Rodeo) 320 West Jefferson	Orpheus Theatre		Razed
Oxmoor Cinemas		Oxmoor Mall, 7900 Shelbyville Road	Closed. Multiplex theater consisted of a total of five screens, two larger ones located on the ground floor level and three smaller screens located on the second floor of the Oxmoor Mall. Fifth screen used a platter system and could show two films back-to-back without switching projectors. Ground floor converted to retail space, second floor no longer accessible.
Palace Theatre	1928-	625 S Fourth St	Also called: Loews, State, United Artists, United Artists Penthouse. Theatre has been restored and now functions as a live concert/performance venue, with occasional film presentations. Facade and interior designed by John Eberson
Parkland Theatre		2817 W. Dumesnil	Razed. Parkland neighborhood.
Parkway Drive-In Theatre		2702 Millers Ln	Closed
Pix Theatre			Razed
Portland Theatre		2204 Portland Avenue	(razed)
Preston Theatre		1249 S. Preston Street	(building still stands in 2017)
Preston Air-Dome, Open-air theater adjacent to Preston Theatre above			
Preston Drive-In Theatre		6705 Preston Hwy	Even though it was still doing very good business it was purchased by the Furrow's Home Improvement chain in the early 1980s and immediately razed. Furrow's closed and the building became a Salvation Army store. The building is currently empty and for sale.
Rex Theatre		408 S. Fourth Street	Razed
Rialto Theater	1921–1968	616 S.Fourth St	Razed in 1969. Designed by the Louisville firm Joseph & Joseph, opened in May 1921. Featured Italian Renaissance style facade and a white marble staircase, seating capacity of 3,500.
Rodeo Theatre (see Orpheum)			Razed
Savoy Theater	1890–1989	211 W. Jefferson St.	Initially called the Grand Opera House, was Vaudeville, then Burlesque, then film theatre. Building razed following extensive damage resulting from arson in 1989. Was scheduled for demolition and amid Louisville's downtown "porno district" by that point.
Scoop Theatre also at various times: The Walnut Theatre and Drury Lane Theatre	1910-1940s		Building still stands, converted to office/retail space in 2000. Originally known as the Walnut Street Theatre, was a vaudeville house until 1930 when it began showing films. Possibly designed by John Eberson. Then known as the Ritz briefly and the Drury Lane Theatre from 1933 to 1940. Acquired its eventual name in the 1940s when it was a popular newsreel theatre. Converted to convention space by James Graham Brown in the early 1950s.
Shelby Theatre		1224 S. Shelby Street	Razed
Shelmar (also known as the Empire)		736 E. Market Street	Closed. The building is occupied by Royals Hot Chicken true as of August 2022.
Showcase Cinemas Louisville	1965–2004	3408 Bardstown Rd	National Amusements. Closed. 13-screen, A local Christian church had expressed interest in purchasing the site, but the deal fell through. Building was recently demolished. 20-acre (81,000 m^{2}) site. Costco is expected to open its second Louisville store on the site in August 2016.
Showcase Cinemas Stonybrook		2745 S Hurstbourne Pky	National Amusements
Skyway Drive-In Theatre		3609 Bardstown Rd	Closed
Southpark Drive-In Theatre		9205 National Tpke	Closed
Star Theatre	226 S. Fourth Street		Razed
Strand Theatre (also known as the Masonic and the Shubert)		Chestnut St.	Razed. Also called: Shubert Theatre.
Sun Theatre	1116 S. 18th Street		Razed
Tinseltown Louisville	1997-	4400 Towne Center Dr	Cinemark Theatres
Twilite Drive-In Theatre	1950-?	4015 Crittenden Dr	Razed. Also called: Twin Drive-In, Twilight Drive-In
Twin Drive-In Theatre			Closed
Uptown Theatre	1928–1989	1502 Bardstown Rd	Closed. Part of The Schuster Building, the theatre's auditorium was razed in 1994 but the former front entrance and lobby area remain as part of the building fronting Bardstown Road. Louisville's first sound theater, also had an orchestra pit. 1000 seats.
Valley Drive-In Theatre		Dixie Hwy S	Closed
Village 8 Theatres	1970s-2022	4014 Dutchmans Ln	Apex Theatres. Closed on July 5, 2022
Vogue Theatre	1939–1998	3727 Lexington Rd	Closed. Theatre gutted and converted in 2006 to a retail center called "The Vogue", marquee was restored and is still prominent. As a theater, the Vogue was known in later years for its long run showing of The Rocky Horror Picture Show. Was described by The Courier-Journal as "perhaps the last genuine neighborhood movie house in Louisville" at the time of its closing.
Walden Theatre		233 W Broadway	Closed. Apartments now stand on the site.
Westend Theatre		3312 W. Broadway	Razed
Westland 4 Theater	July 1975 - 1990	9070 Dixie Hwy, Louisville, KY 40258	Operated by AMC Theatres until purchase by Mid-States in 1977. USA Cinemas took over in 1986. Renamed Park Place Mall Cinemas in 1989. Closed in 1990. Location on map
Westonian Theatre			Razed
Wood's Theatre			Razed

[1] The Lyric Theatre was actually at 601 W. Walnut per a 1929 advertisement.

== See also ==
- List of attractions and events in the Louisville metropolitan area
- Performing arts in Louisville, Kentucky
