= Yuja Wang =

Chinese and American pianist (born 1987)

- 王羽佳
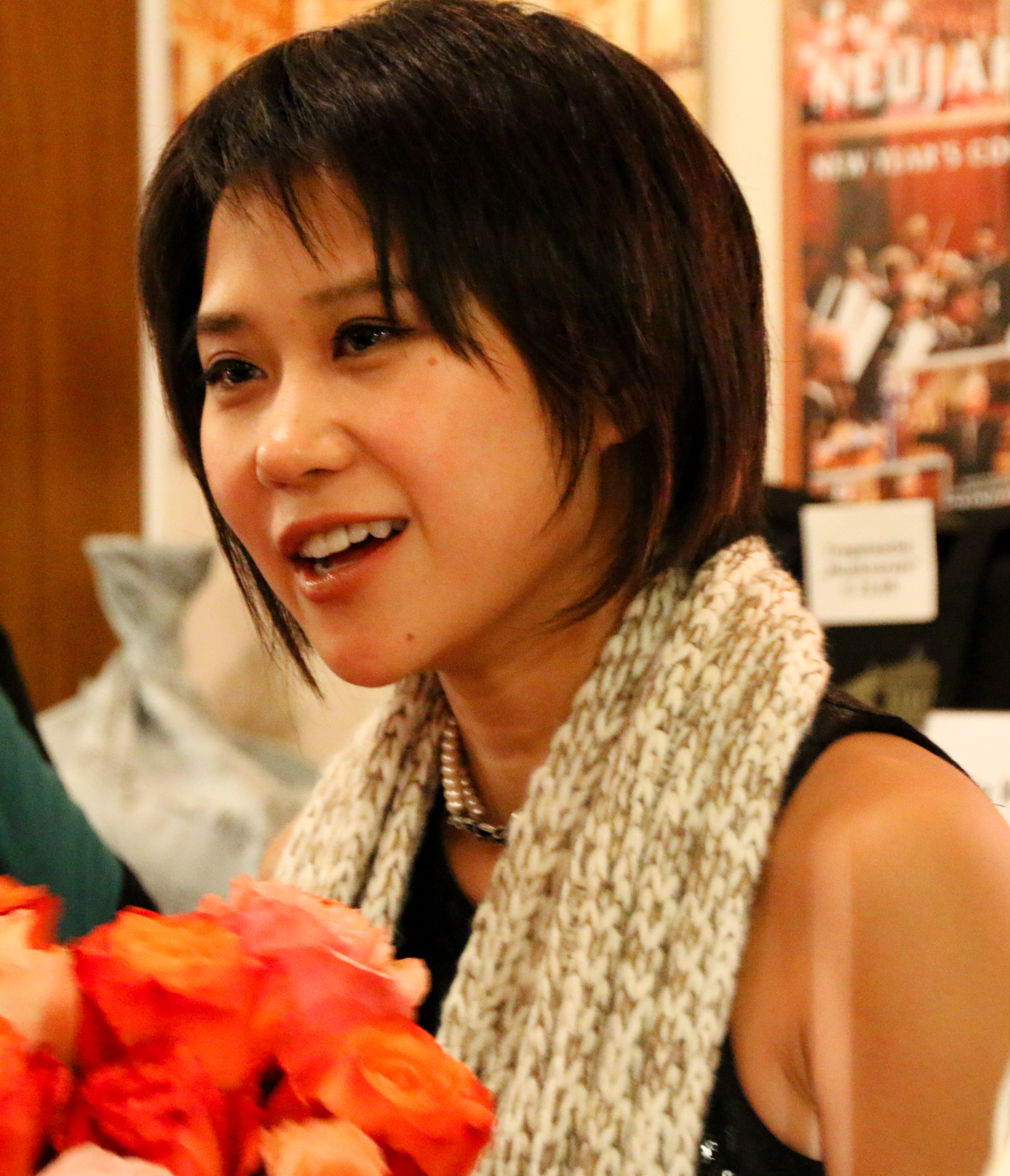
- Wang in Musikverein, Vienna, October 30, 2014
- Born: February 10, 1987 (age 39); Beijing, China
- Citizenship: United States
- Education: Curtis Institute of Music
- Occupation: Classical pianist
- Years active: 1998–present
- Agent: Deutsche Grammophon
- Partner: Klaus Mäkelä (former)
- Awards: Best Classical Instrumental Solo, 66th Annual Grammy Awards

Chinese name
- Traditional Chinese: 王羽佳
Transcriptions
Standard Mandarin
- Hanyu Pinyin: Wáng Yǔjiā
- Gwoyeu Romatzyh: Wang Yeujia
- Wade–Giles: Wang^{2} Yü^{3}-chia^{1}
- Website: yujawang.com

Yuja Wang (Chinese: 王羽佳; pinyin: Wáng Yǔjiā; born February 10, 1987) is a Chinese-born American pianist. She began learning piano at the age of six, and went on to study at the Central Conservatory of Music in Beijing and the Curtis Institute of Music in Philadelphia.

At the age of 21, she was already an internationally recognized concert pianist and signed an exclusive contract with Deutsche Grammophon. Wang resides in New York City.

== Early life and education ==
Wang comes from an artistic family of Hui ethnicity. Her mother is a dancer and her father is a percussionist. Both live in Beijing.

Wang's mother initially hoped her daughter would pursue dance as a career. As a child, however, Wang often amused herself by idly pressing the keys of the family's old piano, a wedding gift to her parents, which sparked her early interest in playing the instrument. She later joked that she was "too lazy" and much preferred "sitting on the piano bench". Wang began learning the piano at age six. At age seven, she began studies at Beijing's Central Conservatory of Music. Her early teachers included Zhou Guangren, Ling Yuan, and other renowned piano pedagogues in China. At age eleven, Wang entered the Morningside Music Bridge International Music Festival (at Mount Royal University in Calgary, Alberta) as the festival's youngest student.

At the age of fifteen, Wang entered the Curtis Institute of Music in Philadelphia, where she studied for five years with Gary Graffman and graduated in 2008. Graffman said that Wang's technique impressed him during her audition, but "it was the intelligence and good taste" of her interpretations that distinguished her.

== Career ==
=== Early career ===
In 1998, at the age of eleven, Wang received third prize in the Ettlingen International Competition for Young Pianists in Germany. Three years later, she won the third prize and the special jury prize (awarded to an outstanding finalist less than 20 years of age, with prize money of 500,000 Japanese yen) at the first Sendai International Music Competition in Sendai, Japan.

In 2002, Wang won the concerto competition at the Aspen Music Festival.

In 2003, Wang made her European debut with the Tonhalle-Orchester Zürich, Switzerland, playing Beethoven's Piano Concerto No. 4 under the baton of David Zinman. She made her North American debut in Ottawa with the National Arts Centre Orchestra in the 2005–2006 season, replacing Radu Lupu performing that Beethoven concerto with Pinchas Zukerman conducting.

On September 11, 2005, Wang was named a 2006 biennial Gilmore Young Artist Award winner, given to the most promising pianists age 22 and younger. As part of the award, she received $15,000, appeared at Gilmore Festival concerts, and had a new piano work commissioned for her.

In 2006, Wang made her New York Philharmonic debut at the Bravo! Vail Music Festival. The following season, she performed with the orchestra under Lorin Maazel during a tour of Japan and Korea by the Philharmonic.

In March 2007, Wang's breakthrough came when she replaced Martha Argerich in concerts held in Boston. Argerich had cancelled her appearances with the Boston Symphony Orchestra on four subscription concerts from March 8 to 13. Wang performed Tchaikovsky's Piano Concerto No. 1 with Charles Dutoit conducting.

=== After 2007 ===
In 2008, Wang toured the U.S. with the Academy of St Martin in the Fields led by Sir Neville Marriner. In 2009, she performed as a soloist with the YouTube Symphony Orchestra, led by Michael Tilson Thomas at Carnegie Hall. Wang performed with the Lucerne Festival Orchestra conducted by Claudio Abbado in Luzern and Beijing, the Royal Philharmonic Orchestra in Spain and in London, and the Hong Kong Philharmonic Orchestra.

In 2009, Wang performed and recorded Mendelssohn's Piano Concerto in G Minor with Kurt Masur at the Verbier Festival, accompanied by Kirill Troussov, David Aaron Carpenter, Maxim Rysanov, Sol Gabetta, and Leigh Mesh. Her performance of Rimsky-Korsakov's "Flight of the Bumblebee" is featured on the Verbier Festival highlights DVD from 2008.

In 2012, Wang toured with the Israel Philharmonic Orchestra and conductor Zubin Mehta in Israel and the U.S., with a performance at Carnegie Hall in New York in September.

Wang toured Asia in November 2012 with the San Francisco Symphony and its conductor Michael Tilson Thomas.

In February 2013, Wang performed and recorded Prokofiev's Concerto No. 2 and Rachmaninoff's Concerto No. 3 with Conductor Gustavo Dudamel and the Venezuelan Orquesta Sinfónica Simón Bolívar. Also in 2013, Wang's recital tour of Japan culminated with her recital debut at Tokyo's Suntory Hall.

Wang made her Berlin Philharmonic debut in May 2015, performing Sergei Prokofiev's 2nd Piano Concerto with Conductor Paavo Järvi. The performance was broadcast live through the orchestra's Digital Concert Hall.

In a departure from her previously predominantly Russian repertoire, Wang played Mozart's Piano Concerto No. 9, the Jeunehomme, in February 2016 at David Geffen Hall in New York on four successive nights with Charles Dutoit conducting, then, in her debut with the Vienna Philharmonic under Valery Gergiev in Munich and Paris.

In March 2016, Wang played for three nights in Messiaen's Turangalîla-Symphonie with Esa-Pekka Salonen conducting. In a recital at Carnegie Hall in May 2016, she played Beethoven's Piano Sonata No. 29, the Hammerklavier, and two Brahms Ballades and Robert Schumann's Kreisleriana.

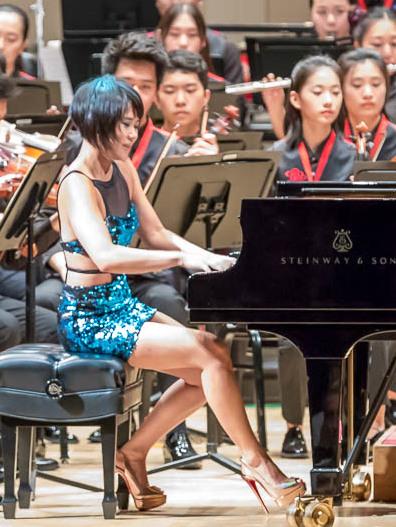
Wang performing at Carnegie Hall in 2017

Wang performed with the National Youth Orchestra of China for its Carnegie Hall premiere on July 22, 2017, with conductor Ludovic Morlot of the Seattle Symphony, performing Tchaikovsky's Piano Concerto No. 1 in B-Flat Minor.

In March 2019, Wang gave the world premiere of the concerto Must the Devil Have All the Good Tunes? by John Adams, composed for Ms. Wang, with the Los Angeles Philharmonic under conductor Gustavo Dudamel. She also paid tribute to Kennedy Center Honoree Michael Tilson Thomas with a rendition of "You Come Here Often?" in 2019.

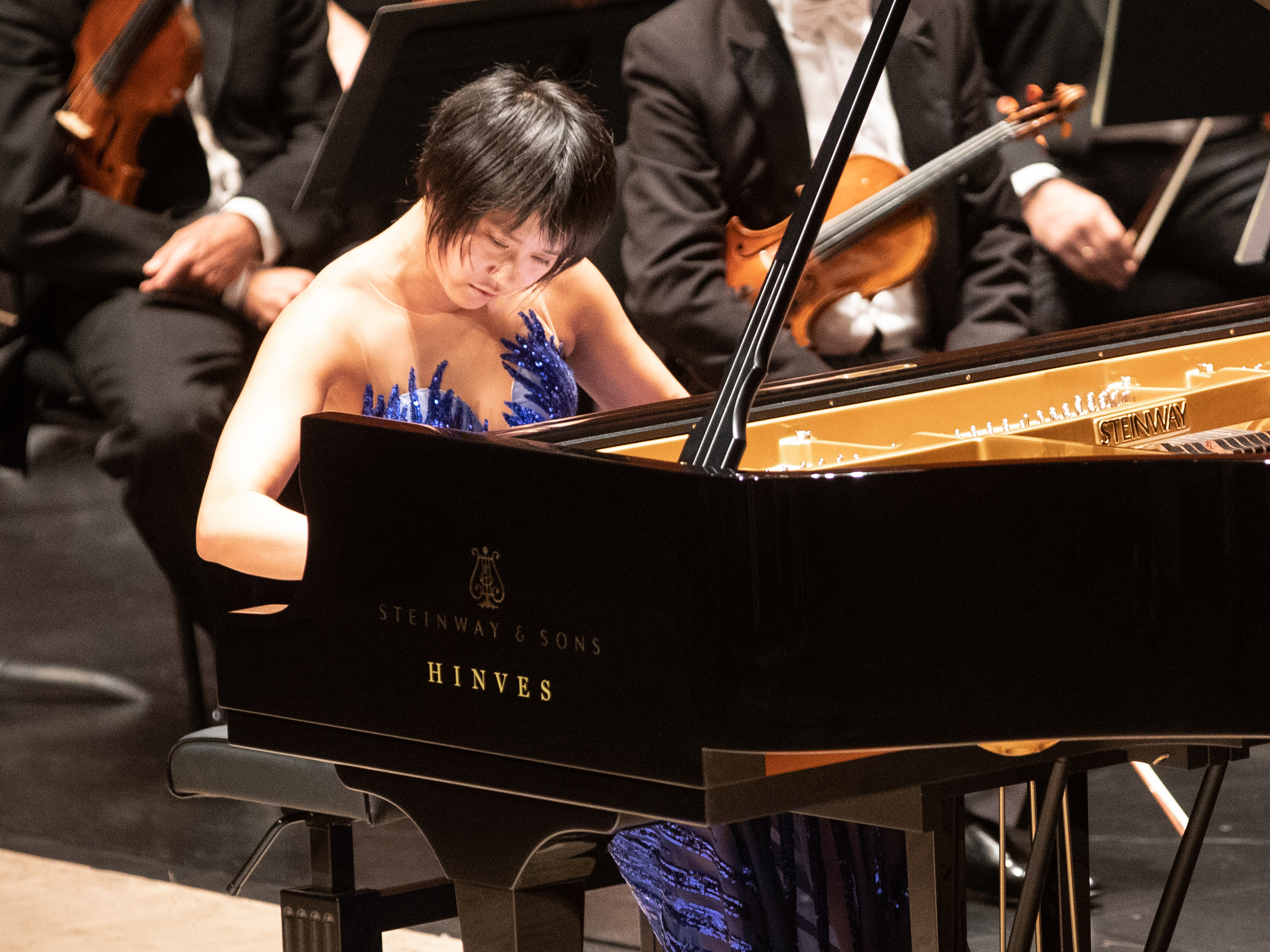
Wang performing with the Orchestre Philharmonique du Luxembourg in 2021

During 2020 and early 2021, many of Wang's scheduled appearances were cancelled or postponed due to the pandemic. As concert activity gradually resumed, she returned to the stage in late 2021.

On October 13, 2022, Wang performed the world premiere of Piano Concerto No. 3 (Lindberg) by Magnus Lindberg with the San Francisco Symphony at Davies Symphony Hall.

On January 28, 2023, Wang performed all four Rachmaninoff piano concertos and his Rhapsody on a Theme of Paganini in a single concert with the Philadelphia Orchestra at Carnegie Hall, a feat conductor Yannick Nézet-Séguin likened to climbing Mount Everest. An audience member collapsed during the last movement of the Piano Concerto No. 2, causing the concert to be paused while they received medical attention. The movement was restarted 20 minutes later. After completing the final concerto, Wang played "Dance of the Blessed Spirits" from Christoph Willibald Gluck's Orfeo ed Euridice as an encore.

In January 2024, Wang was named by Gramophone as one of the "50 Greatest Classical Pianists on Record".

On March 24, 2024, Wang was appointed as the Mary and James G. Wallach Artist-in-Residence of the New York Philharmonic in the 2024–25 season. In October, she signed general management to Askonas Holt and Opus 3 Artists.

On September 23, 2025, Curtis Institute of Music announced the appointment of Wang as Artist Collaborator, Piano, effective for the 2026–27 academic year.

For the 2025–26 season, she is scheduled to open major U.S. orchestras including the San Francisco Symphony and perform at Carnegie Hall and other major venues.

She voiced the character Yuja, radio host of Symphony FM, in the 2026 video game Grand Theft Auto VI.

=== Regular collaborators ===
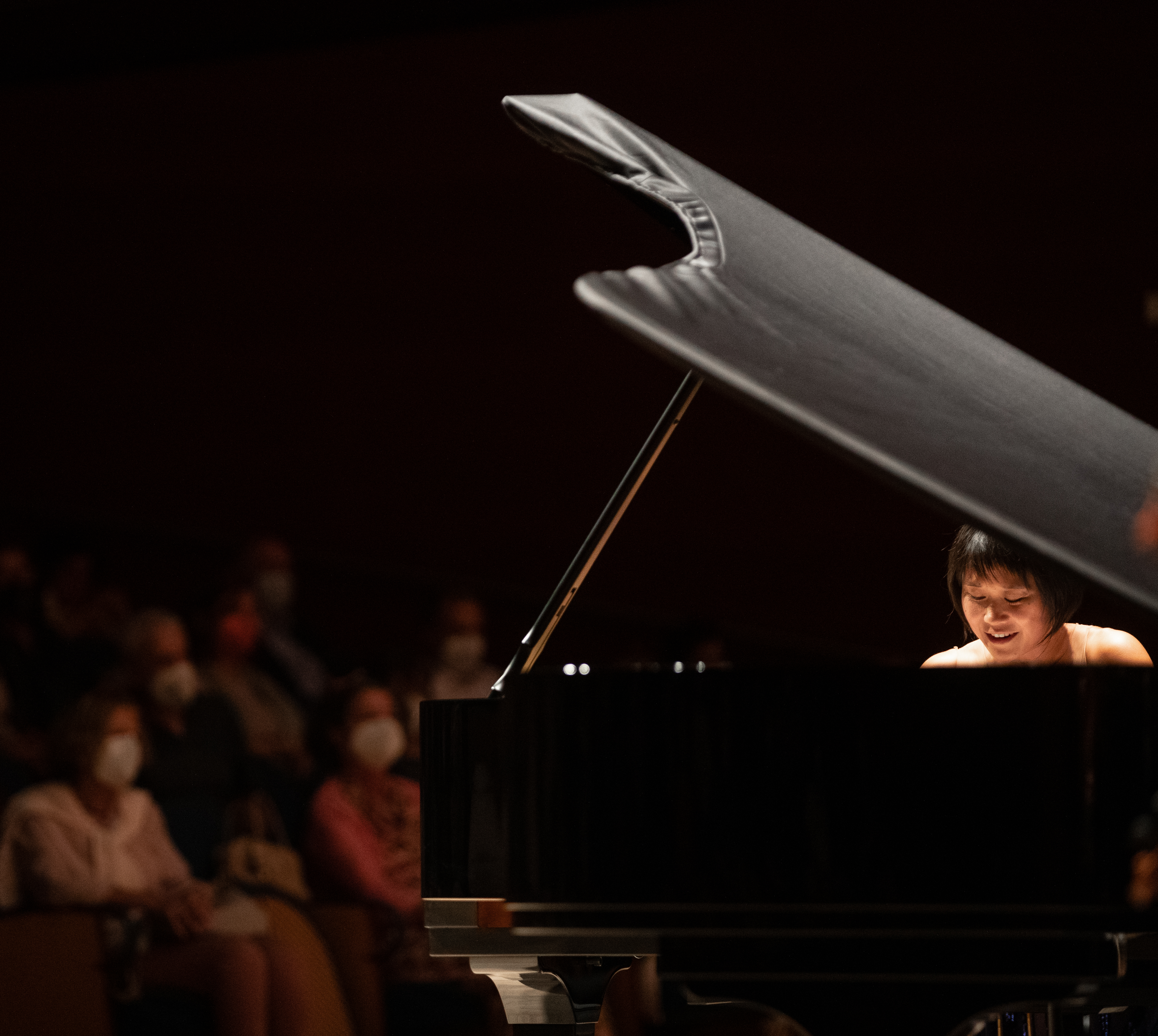
Wang in 2021

Wang has performed with all the major orchestras in the U.S., including the Boston Symphony Orchestra; Chicago Symphony Orchestra; Cleveland Orchestra; Los Angeles Philharmonic; New York Philharmonic; Philadelphia Orchestra; Orlando Philharmonic Orchestra; San Francisco Symphony; St. Louis Symphony Orchestra; and the National Symphony Orchestra.

Internationally, Wang has performed with the Berlin Philharmonic; Czech Philharmonic; Vienna Philharmonic; Royal Concertgebouw Orchestra; London Symphony Orchestra; Orchestre de Paris; Staatskapelle Berlin; Symphonieorchester des Bayerischen Rundfunks; Gewandhausorchester Leipzig; London Philharmonic; Toronto Symphony Orchestra; Israel Philharmonic; Oslo Philharmonic; NHK Symphony Orchestra in Tokyo; Hong Kong Philharmonic Orchestra; and the China Philharmonic, among others.

=== Conducting career ===
Wang has cultivated a long relationship with Mahler Chamber Orchestra (MCO), starting in 2010 with its founder Claudio Abbado, when they recorded the Grammy-nominated album Rachmaninov. In 2017, she ventured into the art of conducting an orchestra with the MCO, leading performances from the piano where she was also the soloist. Since then, she has expanded her pianist-conductor collaborations to include these additional ensembles: Chamber Orchestra of Europe, Lucerne Festival Orchestra, New York Philharmonic, NYO-USA All-Stars, Verbier Festival Chamber Orchestra, Orchestra dell'Accademia Nazionale di Santa Cecilia.

On July 16 2026, she made her podium conducting debut with the Colorado Music Festival Orchestra, leading a performance of the Camille Saint-Saëns Bacchanale without playing the piano.

=== Immersive music ===
In 2023, Wang ventured into playing in an immersive environment in collaboration with the painter David Hockney at the Lightroom in London. This event was called Lightroom Live: Yuja x Hockney; she played piano before an audience surrounded by large-scale 360-degree projections of Hockney's artwork and of Wang in live action. The initial performance in September 2023 was followed by one in September 2024.

In 2025, Wang recorded Playing with Fire: An Immersive Odyssey with Yuja Wang, written and directed by Pierre-Alain Giraud, produced by VIVE Arts and Atlas V, in collaboration with production partner Lightroom. In this mixed reality concert, the audience wears a headset to experience a personalized virtual reality performance, seeing and hearing a recreated holographic Wang playing on a Steinway digital player piano called Spirio. The multisensory immersion also includes fragrances selected by Wang to accompany each musical piece. Playing with Fire premiered at Philharmonie de Paris on 14 November 2025; the installation has since played at the Festival de Cannes Immersive Competition in May 2026, Shanghai in June 2026.

== Personal life ==
Wang was the partner of conductor Klaus Mäkelä.

== Critical reception ==
In a review of her 2011 Carnegie Hall debut, Anthony Tommasini wrote in the New York Times:

From the opening piece, an early Scriabin prelude, Ms. Wang played this Chopinesque music, all rippling left-hand figures, and dreamy melodic lines, with a delicacy, poetic grace, and attention to inner musical details that commanded respect. After intermission she offered a rhapsodic, uncommonly nuanced account of the formidable Liszt Sonata in B minor. But the most revealing performance came in Prokofiev's Piano Sonata No. 6 in A. Completed in 1940, this nearly 30-minute work channels some barbaric, propulsive, harmonically brittle outbursts into a formal four-movement sonata structure. In most readings, intriguing tension results from hearing the music of such aggressive modernism reined in by Neo-Classical constraints. Ms. Wang reconciled these conflicting elements through a performance of impressive clarity and detail.

In June 2012, Joshua Kosman of the San Francisco Chronicle wrote that Wang is "quite simply, the most dazzlingly, uncannily gifted pianist in the concert world today, and there's nothing left to do but sit back, listen and marvel at her artistry."

From a May 2013 Carnegie Hall concert, The New York Times reported that Wang's "fortissimos were fearsome, but so, in a quieter way, were the longing melodic lines of the first movement of Rachmaninoff's Sonata No. 2." The reviewer added:

The liquidity of her phrasing in the second movement of Scriabin's Sonata No. 2 eerily evoked the sound of woodwinds. In that composer's Sonata No. 6 she juxtaposed colors granitic and gauzy to eerily brilliant effect before closing the written program with a rabid rendition of the one-piano version of "La valse", accentuating the sickliness of Ravel's distorted waltzes.

In May 2016, The New York Times reviewed her performance of Beethoven's Hammerklavier Sonata:

Ms. Wang's virtuosity goes well beyond the uncanny facility. Right through this Beethoven performance she wondrously brought out intricate details, inner voices, and harmonic colorings. The first movement had élan and daring. The scherzo skipped along with mischievousness and rhythmic bite. In the grave, with great slow movement, she played with restraint and poignancy. She kept you on edge during the elusive transition to the gnarly, dense fugue, which she then dispatched with unfathomable dexterity. This was not a probing or profound Hammerklavier. But I admired Ms. Wang's combination of youthful energy and musical integrity.

External image
- Wang at the Hollywood Bowl, August 2, 2011

Wang has received attention for her eye-catching outfits and glamorous stage presence as well as for her piano playing. In a much-quoted 2011 review of a concert at the Hollywood Bowl, Los Angeles Times classical music critic Mark Swed wrote:

But it was Yuja Wang's orange dress for which Tuesday night is likely to be remembered… Her dress Tuesday was so short and tight that had there been any less of it, the Bowl might have been forced to restrict admission to any music lover under 18 not accompanied by an adult. Had her heels been any higher, walking, to say nothing of her sensitive pedaling, would have been unfeasible.

Swed was criticized for this aspect of his review by Anne Midgette in a Washington Post article titled "Which offends? Her short dress or critic's narrow view?"

In 2017, Michael Levin of HuffPost described Wang after her concert with Leonidas Kavakos at David Geffen Hall as "one of the most talented, enthralling, and even mesmerizing performers on the world scene".

In January 2023, Wang's more than four-hour marathon concert of all four Rachmaninoff piano concertos at Carnegie Hall garnered widespread attention and acclaim. Clemency Burton-Hill wrote that "Wang's ability to reconcile the many complexities of the moment with such grace, even joy, was notable." Zachary Woolfe in the New York Times wrote: "virtuosity on this level, in material this ravishing, is elevating to witness – which is why, even after so many hours, I was left at the end feeling an exhilarated lightness."

In May 2024, Wang released her new album, The Vienna Recital, and Gramophone music critic Jonathan Dobson wrote:

Yuja Wang is one of the most gifted and influential pianists of our time. She possesses a technique of flawless precision, phenomenal power and stamina, a rhythmic sense as accurate as an atomic clock, and a diamond-white sound that whatever it lacks in warmth, depth and sonority, it makes up for in sheer clarity, dynamic range and glitter. Wang generates the kind of visceral excitement that Argerich and Horowitz did in their youth. The more difficult and complex the music, the better – and the faster she plays it – as this recital programme from a concert in Vienna in 2022 amply demonstrates.

In February 2026 she accused the critic Norman Lebrecht of misogynistic bullying, following his response to her withdrawing from a scheduled BBC interview with him.

== Discography ==
In January 2009, Wang signed a recording contract with Deutsche Grammophon.

Although there are reports Wang released a debut CD in 1995, there is little information available about it.

- 2009: Sonatas & Etudes
- 2009: Mendelssohn Piano Concerto No. 1 with Verbier Festival Orchestra conducted by Kurt Masur – live at Verbier Festival, Switzerland
- 2009: Prokofiev Piano Concerto No. 3 with Lucerne Festival Orchestra conducted by Claudio Abbado – live at Lucerne Festival, Switzerland
- 2010: Transformation
- 2010: Schubert, Schumann, Scriabin and Prokofiev – live at Verbier Festival, Switzerland
- 2011: Rachmaninov Piano Concerto No. 2 & Rhapsody on a Theme of Paganini with Mahler Chamber Orchestra conducted by Claudio Abbado – live in Ferrara, Italy
- 2011: Rachmaninov Piano Concerto No. 2 with Verbier Festival Orchestra conducted by Yuri Temirkanov – live at Verbier Festival, Switzerland
- 2012: Fantasia
- 2014: Rachmaninov Piano Concerto No. 3 & Prokofiev Piano Concerto No. 2 with Orquesta Sinfónica Simón Bolívar de Venezuela conducted by Gustavo Dudamel – live in Caracas, Venezuela
- 2014: Brahms: The Violin Sonatas with Leonidas Kavakos
- 2015: Maurice Ravel Complete Orchestral Works with Tonhalle-Orchester Zürich conducted by Lionel Bringuier
- 2017: The Asia Tour with Berliner Philharmoniker conducted by Sir Simon Rattle – live in Wuhan, China
- 2018: The Berlin Recital – live from Berlin, Germany
- 2018: The Peace Concert Versailles with Wiener Philharmoniker conducted by Franz Welser-Möst – live at Palace of Versailles, France
- 2019: Blue Hour with Andreas Ottensamer
- 2019: Sommernachtskonzert: Gershwin Rhapsody in Blue with Wiener Philharmoniker conducted by Gustavo Dudamel – live at Schönbrunn Palace, Austria
- 2019: Franck, Chopin with Gautier Capuçon
- 2020: Adams, Must the Devil Have All the Good Tunes? with Los Angeles Philharmonic conducted by Gustavo Dudamel
- 2020: Rachmaninov Cello Sonata, Op. 19 with Lynn Harrell – live at Verbier Festival 2008
- 2023: The American Project featuring You Come Here Often? by Michael Tilson Thomas and Piano Concerto by Teddy Abrams
- 2023: The Verbier Festival Debut Recital 2008 – live at Verbier Festival 2008
- 2023: Rachmaninoff: The Piano Concertos & Paganini Rhapsody; with Gustavo Dudamel and the Los Angeles Philharmonic
- 2024: The Vienna Recital – live from Vienna, Austria
- 2025: Dmitri Shostakovich: The Piano Concertos & Solo Works; with Andris Nelsons and the Boston Symphony Orchestra
- 2025: Olivier Messiaen: Turangalîla-Symphonie with Cécile Lartigau and Andris Nelsons and the Boston Symphony Orchestra

== World premieres ==
Works written for and premiered by Wang include the following:

- 2009: Artless Pages (Seven Impromptus for Piano) by Rodion Shchedrin: Église de Verbier in Verbier, Switzerland (August 1, 2009)
- 2009: Piano Concerto by Jennifer Higdon: National Symphony Orchestra conducted by Andrew Litton, Kennedy Center in Washington, D.C., United States (December 3, 2009)
- 2015: You Come Here Often? for solo piano by Michael Tilson Thomas: Barbican Centre in London, United Kingdom (March 15, 2015)
- 2015: Farewell My Concubine for Peking Opera Soprano and Piano by Tan Dun: Guangzhou Symphony Orchestra conducted by Long Yu, Xinghai Concert Hall in Guangzhou, China (July 31, 2015)
- 2019: Must the Devil Have All the Good Tunes? by John Adams: Los Angeles Philharmonic conducted by Gustavo Dudamel, Walt Disney Concert Hall in Los Angeles, USA (March 7, 2019)
- 2022: Piano Concerto by Teddy Abrams: Louisville Orchestra conducted by Teddy Abrams, Kentucky Center for the Performing Arts in Louisville, USA (January 7, 2022)
- 2022: Piano Concerto No. 3 by Magnus Lindberg: San Francisco Symphony conducted by Esa-Pekka Salonen, Davies Symphony Hall in San Francisco, USA (October 13, 2022)

Other pieces that received world premieres with Wang as soloist include the following:

- 2015: The Food of Love by Carlo Galante: Filarmonica della Scala conducted by Daniele Rustioni, La Scala in Milan, Italy (February 23, 2015)
- 2016: Cello Sonata by Evgeny Kissin: with cellist Gautier Capuçon, Salle des Combins in Verbier, Switzerland (July 25, 2016)
- 2025: Displaced Études for piano No. 1 by Ahmed Alom: with Tiler Peck, David Geffen Hall in New York, USA (January 25, 2025)

== Awards ==
- 2006: Gilmore – Young Artist Award
- 2009: Gramophone – Young Artist of the Year
- 2009, 2011, 2018, 2019, 2026: Grammy Award – nominee
- 2010: Avery Fisher Career Grant
- 2011: Echo Klassik Awards – Young Artist of the Year
- 2017: Musical America – Artist of the Year
- 2019: Gramophone – Instrumental Award for The Berlin Recital
- 2021: Opus Klassik – for recording of John Adams: Must the Devil Have All the Good Tunes?
- 2023: Grammy Award – The American Project with Teddy Abrams and the Louisville Orchestra
- 2023: Pianote – Classical Pianist of the Year
- 2025: Asia Society – Asia Game Changer Award
- 2026: Grammy Award – Messiaen: Turangalîla-Symphonie with Andris Nelsons and the Boston Symphony Orchestra

== Movie scores ==
- 2013: Summer in February
- 2023: The Hunger Games: The Ballad of Songbirds & Snakes
