= Piano Concerto (Abrams) =

Teddy Abrams

- by Teddy Abrams
- Audio recording album cover
- Genre: Contemporary classical, Orchestral jazz
- Composed: 2022
- Duration: c. 38 minutes
- Scoring: Piano concerto

Premiere
- Date: January 7, 2022
- Location: Kentucky Center for the Performing Arts
- Conductor: Teddy Abrams
- Performers: Louisville Orchestra, Yuja Wang

The American composer and conductor Teddy Abrams composed his Piano Concerto for pianist Yuja Wang, who was his classmate during their student days at the Curtis Institute of Music. Wang performed its world premiere in Whitney Hall at the Kentucky Center for the Performing Arts with the Louisville Orchestra conducted by Abrams on 7 January 2022. An audio recording of the performance on the next day, 8 January, was released by Deutsche Grammophon on 12 January 2023 as the main piece in the album The American Project. The album received a Grammy Award for Best Classical Instrumental Solo on February 4, 2024 for Wang and Abrams.

== Composition ==
Abrams initially developed this composition as a short companion to Gershwin's Rhapsody in Blue, then following a discussion with Wang about her recording the Rhapsody with the orchestra, the work transformed into a standalone orchestral showpiece and was dedicated to Wang.

The Gershwin influence is apparent in the big-band overture and an “orchestra break”. Orchestration is more than big-band, however: the premiere employed more than 60 orchestral players, "including several imported for the occasion (on three saxophones, electric guitar and bass, drum kit, etc.), a band within the larger group". Four semi-improvised cadenzas in the classical style showcase the virtuosity of the soloist. Several other instrumental solos are featured throughout the piece, including violin, oboe, trumpet, and saxophone.

A performance of the piano concerto has a duration of roughly 35 to 40 minutes. The single-movement concerto is constructed in eleven sections, traversing multiple genres and styles.

1. Overture. Swing
2. Cadenza I
3. Exposition
4. Orchestra Break
5. Exploration
6. Cadenza II
7. Relaxed
8. Solos
9. Cadenza III
10. Return. Swing
11. Cadenza IV & Coda

== Reception ==
Annette Skaggs of Arts-Louisville thought it was "a marvelous and charismatic concerto", though it "needs to be honed a little more", and sometimes "it was very difficult to hear the sax".

David Mermelstein of the Wall Street Journal found "it lacks originality, even as it revels in craft", and is "missing a vision beyond the sum of its parts".

Richard S. Ginell of San Francisco Classical Voice said "I rather like this piece" even though the “Solos” section "gets a bit awkward".

Nathan Cone of Texas Public Radio was "immediately taken from the get-go", only wishing "the strings could have been mixed a little hotter, as they sometimes get overpowered by the brass and saxophones".
