= Music Theatre Louisville =

Music Theatre Louisville was a non-profit organization in Louisville, Kentucky, dedicated to producing, presenting, and developing diverse and affordable entertainment. Up through 2008, the company staged several shows during the summer at Iroquois Amphitheater in Iroquois Park. In 2009, the company moved to the Bomhard Theater at The Kentucky Center.

In 2008, the company officially changed its name to Broadway at Iroquois, banking on the name recognition of its Iroquois Park location. However, after its move to the Kentucky Center, they reverted to the Music Theatre Louisville moniker.

After the 2011 season, Music Theatre Louisville merged with Stage One Children's Theatre to form Stage One Family Theatre.

== 1987 season ==
- Annie
- Kismet
- Pirates of Penzance

== 1988 season ==
- Oklahoma!
- Grease
- Peter Pan

== 1989 season ==
- Annie Get Your Gun
- Camelot
- The Wizard of Oz

== 1990 season ==
For the 1990 season, Music Theatre Louisville moved to the Macauley Theatre (now the Brown Theatre) in downtown Louisville.

- West Side Story
- Little Shop of Horrors
- Evita

== 1991 season ==
- You're a Good Man, Charlie Brown

== 1992 season ==
- Hello, Dolly!
- Big River
- Annie

== 1993 season ==
- South Pacific
- Fiddler on the Roof
- The Music Man

== 1994 season ==
- 1776
- Rodgers and Hammerstein's Cinderella
- Anything Goes

== 1995 season ==
- The Secret Garden
- Little Shop of Horrors
- Brigadoon

== 1996 season ==
- Bye Bye Birdie
- A Chorus Line
- Oliver!

== 1997 season ==
- The Sound of Music
- Two By Two
- Seven Brides for Seven Brothers

== 1998 season ==
- Once Upon a Mattress
- Oklahoma!

== 1999 season ==
- The Music Man
- West Side Story

== 2000 season ==
- Annie
- Godspell

== 2001 season ==
- The Fantasticks
- Broadway Under the Stars

Due to the extensive renovation of Iroquois Amphitheatre, Music Theatre Louisville produced a limited season in the summer of 2001, with only one production on a small stage set up adjacent to the amphitheatre. There was no 2002 season.

Music Theatre Louisville also presented an original Broadway Revue show on the temporary stage in 2001, entitled "Broadway Under the Stars"

== 2003 season ==
- The Wizard of Oz

After more than two years of renovation, Iroquois Amphitheatre reopened to the public in the summer of 2003. The renovation yielded (among other things) a roof over the front section of seating with multiple ceiling fans, new sound and lighting equipment, new concession areas sponsored by local vendors, a bright new show curtain, increased backstage and scene shop space, and comfortable new seats. Music Theatre Louisville marked the occasion with a premiere song-and-dance review in June 2003 before presenting their summer-long production of The Wizard of Oz.

== 2004 season ==
- Peter Pan
- Joseph and the Amazing Technicolor Dreamcoat
- Crazy for You

In 2004, Music Theatre Louisville added a unique new feature to their lineup, the Rising Stars Program. Beginning this year, one local high school would be selected to present their production from the previous school year, on the Iroquois Amphitheatre stage, in collaboration with the MTL crew.

For the inaugural Rising Stars Program, MTL selected Crazy for You, a production of New Albany High School in nearby New Albany, Indiana. This acclaimed production had also been taken to the International Thespian Festival in Lincoln, Nebraska that same summer.

The production was so successful that the Rising Stars Program became an annual event and a favorite of MTL audiences.

== 2005 season ==
- You're a Good Man, Charlie Brown
- Disney's Beauty and the Beast
- Seussical the Musical
- Jesus Christ Superstar

For the first time in its history, Music Theatre Louisville produced a daytime show, intended mainly for smaller children, with its limited-run matinee production of You're a Good Man, Charlie Brown.

The 2005 Rising Stars Production was Floyd Central High School's production of Seussical the Musical. Like the previous Rising Stars show, Seussical had also been presented at the International Thespian Festival.

== 2006 season ==
- Schoolhouse Rock Live! May 9–20, 2006
- West Side Story, June 16–25, 2006
- Anything Goes, July 7–16, 2006
- Rodgers and Hammerstein's Cinderella, August 4–13, 2006
- Brigadoon, September 8–17, 2006

== 2007 season ==
- A Year with Frog and Toad May 8–18, 2007
- Hello Dolly!, June 15–24, 2007
- 42nd Street, July 6–15, 2007
- Disney's High School Musical, August 3–12, 2007
- Oliver!, September 7–16, 2007

== 2008 season ==
- Willy Wonka & the Chocolate Factory June 13–22, 2008
- Cats July 11–20, 2008
- The Wiz August 8–17, 2008

== 2009 season ==
- Mame June 26 - July 3, 2009
- Singin' in the Rain July 10–18, 2009
- Hairspray July 31 - August 9, 2009

== 2010 season ==
- 1776 June 25 - July 3, 2010
- Nunsense July 16–25, 2010
- Annie August 6–15, 2010

== 2011 season ==
- Ain't Misbehavin' June 24 - July 2, 2011
- Guys and Dolls July 15–23, 2011
- Big: The Musical August 5–14, 2011
