= ArtSpace Louisville =

Coordinates: 38°14′46.9″N 85°45′27.0″W

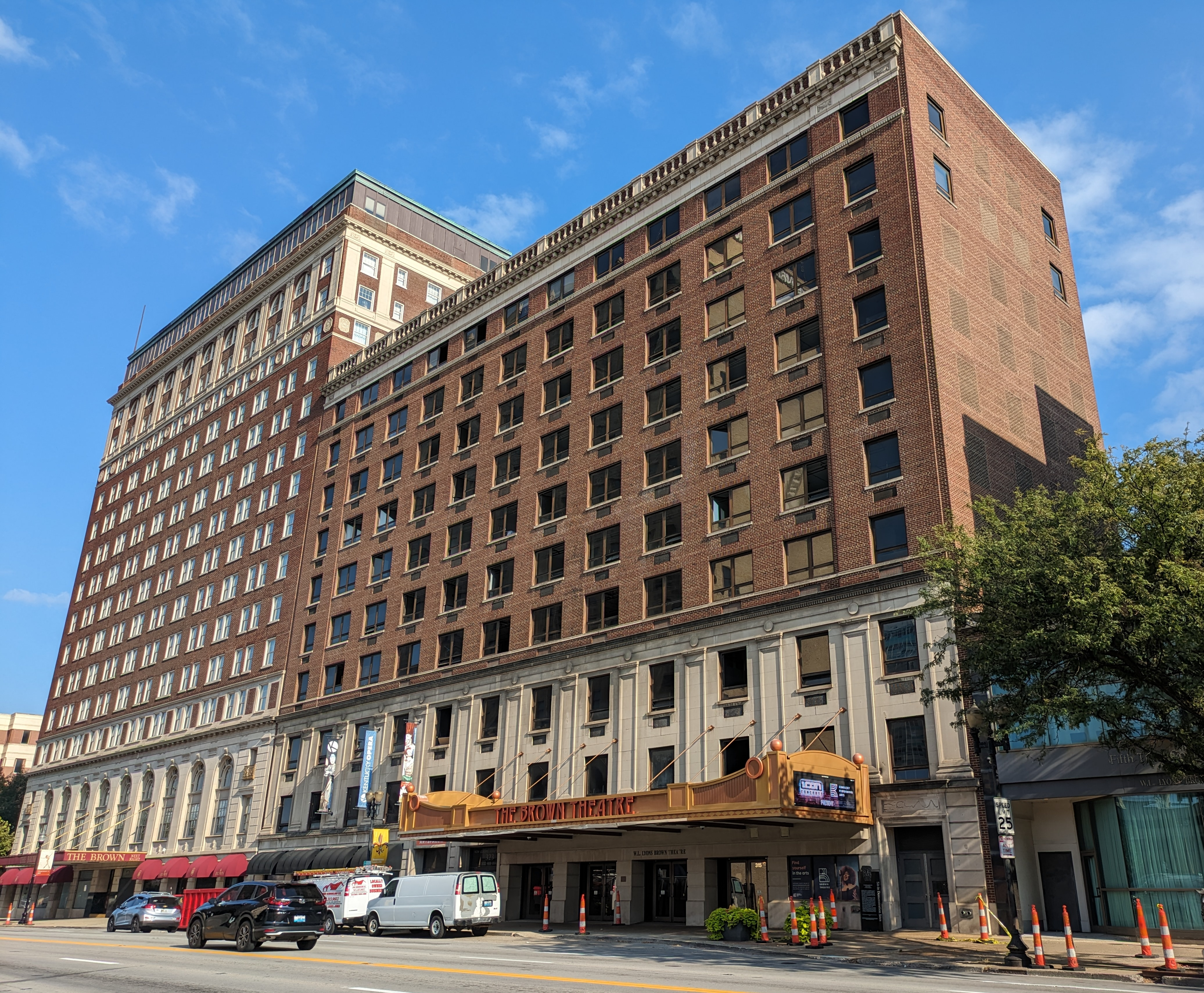

Formerly the Brown Office Building, ArtSpace is a mixed-use development space for not-for-profit organizations and educational institutions in Louisville, Kentucky. The space includes the Brown Theatre, a non-profit business incubator, arts administrative offices, classrooms, meeting spaces, a rehearsal hall, and costume shop.

== History ==
ArtSpace is directed by a partner corporation of the Fund for the Arts, FFTA Properties Inc., and managed by the Kentucky Center for the Performing Arts, under a contract with the Fund.

The ArtSpace lobby and floors one through eight were donated to the Fund for the Arts in 2006 by members of Brown Office Building LLC. Brown Office Building LLC retained ownership of the ninth and tenth floors for development into residential condominiums known as the Lofts at ArtSpace.

The building is used to house several local arts groups and to create an incubator setting for emerging artists and groups in the city. By housing several arts groups in a single location, many administrative functions are shared thereby saving the groups several hundreds of thousands of dollars each year.

A nonprofit business catalyst, C², is also a collaborative effort between the Fund for the Arts, the University of Louisville College of Business, Center for Nonprofit Excellent and Jefferson Community and Technical College, among others sponsored by Brown-Forman Corporation. C² serves as a resource for all arts member groups associated with the Fund for the Arts and is likewise housed in ArtSpace.

ArtSpace is located at 321 W. Broadway in Louisville, Kentucky and adjoins the W.L. Lyons Brown Theatre.
