= Lucky (2017 American film) =

Drama film directed by John Carroll Lynch

- Theatrical release poster
- Directed by: John Carroll Lynch
- Written by: Logan Sparks; Drago Sumonja
- Produced by: Ira Steven Behr; Danielle Renfrew Behrens; Greg Gilreath; Adam Hendricks; Richard Kahan; John H. Lang; Logan Sparks; Drago Sumonja
- Starring: Harry Dean Stanton; David Lynch; Ron Livingston; Ed Begley Jr.; Tom Skerritt
- Cinematography: Tim Suhrstedt
- Music by: Elvis Kuehn
- Production companies: Superlative Films; Divide/Conquer; Lagralane Group
- Distributed by: Magnolia Pictures
- Release dates: March 11, 2017 (SXSW); September 29, 2017 (U.S.)
- Running time: 88 minutes
- Country: United States
- Language: English
- Box office: $955,925

Lucky is a 2017 American independent neo-Western drama film directed by John Carroll Lynch in his directorial debut, written by Logan Sparks and Drago Sumonja, and starring Harry Dean Stanton, with supporting roles played by David Lynch, Ron Livingston, Ed Begley Jr., Tom Skerritt, Barry Shabaka Henley, James Darren, and Beth Grant. The film tells the story of 90-year-old Lucky as he comes to terms with his own mortality and searches for enlightenment.

The film premiered at South by Southwest in March 2017, and was released in the United States by Magnolia Pictures in September of that year. It received positive reviews from critics and received several accolades. It was one of Stanton's final onscreen roles before his death, and Darren's final film role. Stanton posthumously won the Satellite Award for Best Actor in a Motion Picture for his performance.

== Plot ==
90-year-old Lucky lives in an isolated house in a small desert town in Arizona. At a convenience store, Lucky buys a pack of cigarettes and a carton of milk. The owner, Bibi, says that her son Juan is having his tenth birthday in a week. That evening, Lucky stops at a bar called Elaine's and has Bloody Marias with the locals. One of the regulars, Howard, is depressed that his pet tortoise, named President Roosevelt, has escaped.

The next morning, Lucky becomes entranced by the blinking numbers on his coffeepot. He gets light-headed and falls over, smashing his ceramic mug. At a clinic, Dr. Christian Kneedler gives Lucky a clean bill of health and says that Lucky has out-smoked the majority of people his age. At a diner, Lucky mentions how he fell and everyone becomes concerned for his safety. That night, Lucky calls a friend while watching TV. Lucky says that when he was a boy in Kentucky, he shot a mockingbird with his BB gun. It was the saddest thing he ever experienced.

Back at the bar, Lucky listens to a story from local Paulie about how he met and married his wife. Lucky, on the other hand, never married or had any lasting relationships. Lucky sees Howard talking with lawyer Bobby Lawrence about making a will for himself and wanting to leave all of his possessions to President Roosevelt. Lucky becomes hostile and challenges Bobby to a fight outside. However, Paulie says that Bobby will not fight and that Lucky should go home. Later, Loretta, a woman who works at the diner, visits Lucky to check on him. While smoking marijuana, Lucky shows Loretta old photos of his time in the US Navy, and they watch old VHS tapes of Liberace concerts. While having coffee at the diner, Lucky runs into Bobby and mentions his accident. In turn, Bobby talks about a time when he nearly got hit by a garbage truck and tells Lucky to always be prepared for the unexpected. Lucky visits a pet store and buys a box of crickets.

Lucky meets Fred, a World War II Marine veteran, and mentions his time in the US Navy during the war in the Pacific. Lucky got his nickname from having the relatively safe job of cook on an LST. (Note: In his own life, the actor Stanton did a stint as a cook aboard the USS LST-970, in World War II.) Fred tells a story about how after the Marines secured a beach, the locals began to commit suicide by jumping off cliffs. After a battle, he encountered a child, smiling amidst the carnage. Fred remarked to his fellow Marine that at least someone was glad to see them, only to be told that the girl was a Buddhist and was smiling at the prospect of dying. The story leaves Lucky speechless. Upon returning home, he sets the clock on his coffee machine to the correct time, stopping it from blinking. He attends Juan's birthday party and enjoys himself. He spontaneously sings "Volver Volver" for the party goers.

That evening, Lucky returns to the bar for more Bloody Marias. Howard has not found his tortoise and has concluded that all things must eventually come to an end. Lucky then attempts to light a cigarette at the bar despite being ordered not to do so by the owner, Elaine. He then delivers a speech that everything goes away eventually and that we are left with nothing. Elaine asks what is one supposed to do with nothing. Lucky replies "you smile". The remark transforms the mood of the bar; Lucky lights up his cigarette and steps outside.

The next morning, Lucky goes for a walk through town, passing by the outdoor botanic garden and the bar. In the desert, Lucky looks up at a saguaro cactus and lights a cigarette. He smiles before heading back into town. As Lucky walks down the road alone, a tortoise trudges nearby.

== Cast ==
- Harry Dean Stanton as "Lucky"
- David Lynch as Howard
- Ron Livingston as Bobby Lawrence
- Ed Begley Jr. as Dr. Christian Kneedler
- Tom Skerritt as Fred
- Barry Shabaka Henley as Joe
- James Darren as Paulie
- Beth Grant as Elaine
- Yvonne Huff as Loretta
- Hugo Armstrong as Vincent
- Bertila Damas as Bibi
- Ana Mercedes as Victoria, Bibi's Mother
- Amy Claire as Frances, Pet Shop Worker
- Pam Sparks as Pam

== Production ==
On July 7, 2016, it was revealed that Lucky had begun filming in Los Angeles.

On April 7, 2017, it was announced that Magnolia Pictures acquired U.S. and international rights to distribute the film. The film was released in the United States on September 29, 2017, two weeks after Stanton's death.

== Reception ==
On Rotten Tomatoes, Lucky has a rating of 97%, based on 139 reviews, with an average score of 7.82/10. The website's critical consensus reads, "Lucky is a bittersweet meditation on mortality, punctuating the career of beloved character actor Harry Dean Stanton." On Metacritic, the film has a score of 80 out of 100, based on 34 critics, indicating "generally favorable" reviews.

Matt Zoller Seitz of RogerEbert.com gave the film four out of four stars, writing that the film is: "The humblest deep movie of recent years, a work in the same vein as American marginalia like 'Stranger Than Paradise' and 'Trees Lounge,' but with its own rhythm and color, its own emotional temperature, its own reasons for revealing and concealing things." Seitz later named Lucky as the best film of 2017, stating that "I didn't expect much more than indie-film quirk when I read the description of this film, but emotionally it destroyed me."

=== Accolades ===
Award	Date of ceremony	Category	Recipient(s)	Result	Ref.
Camerimage International Film Festival	November 18, 2017	Directors' Debuts Competition	John Carroll Lynch	Nominated	
Chicago Film Critics Association	December 12, 2017	Best Actor	Harry Dean Stanton	Nominated	
Chicago Film Critics Association	December 12, 2017	Most Promising Filmmaker	John Carroll Lynch	Nominated	
Gijón International Film Festival	November 25, 2017	AISGE Award for Best Actor	Harry Dean Stanton	Won	
Gijón International Film Festival	November 25, 2017	Best Original Score	Elvis Kuehn	Won	
Gotham Independent Film Awards	November 27, 2017	Best Actor	Harry Dean Stanton	Nominated	
Haifa International Film Festival	October 14, 2017	Carmel Award for Best Film	Lucky	Nominated	
Haifa International Film Festival	October 14, 2017	Fedeora Award - Directors of Tomorrow	John Carroll Lynch	Won	
Lisbon & Estoril Film Festival	November 26, 2017	Jaeger - LeCoultre Best Film Award	Lucky	Nominated	
Locarno Film Festival	August 12, 2017	Golden Leopard	Lucky	Nominated	
Locarno Film Festival	August 12, 2017	Prize of the Ecumenical Jury	Lucky	Won	
Satellite Awards	February 11, 2018	Best Actor – Motion Picture	Harry Dean Stanton	Won (Note: Tied with Gary Oldman for Darkest Hour)	
Satellite Awards	February 11, 2018	Special Achievement Award for Best First Feature	John Carroll Lynch	Won	
Saturn Awards	June 27, 2018	Best Independent Film	Lucky	Nominated	
Tallgrass Film Festival	October 22, 2017	Outstanding Screenplay	Logan Sparks and Drago Sumonja	Won	
