= Harry Dean Stanton =

American actor (1926–2017)

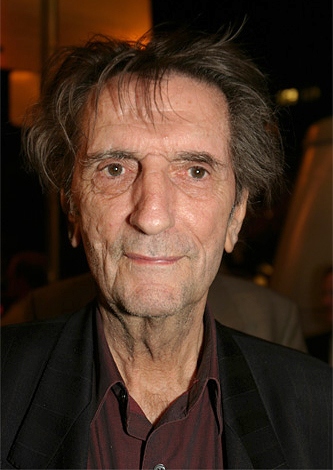
- Stanton in 2006
- Born: July 14, 1926; West Irvine, Kentucky, U.S.
- Died: September 15, 2017 (aged 91); Los Angeles, California, U.S.
- Occupations: Actor, Musician
- Years active: 1954–2017
- Website: www.harrydeanstanton.org

Harry Dean Stanton (July 14, 1926 – September 15, 2017) was an American actor and musician. In a career that spanned more than six decades, Stanton played supporting roles in films including Cool Hand Luke (1967), Kelly's Heroes (1970), Dillinger (1973), The Godfather Part II (1974), Alien (1979), Escape from New York (1981), Christine (1983), Repo Man (1984), One Magic Christmas (1985), Pretty in Pink (1986), The Last Temptation of Christ (1988), Dream a Little Dream (1989), Wild at Heart (1990), The Straight Story (1999), The Green Mile (1999), The Man Who Cried (2000), Alpha Dog (2006), Inland Empire (2006), Rango (2011), The Avengers (2012), and Seven Psychopaths (2012). He had rare lead roles in Paris, Texas (1984) and Lucky (2017).

== Early life and education ==
Stanton was born in West Irvine, Kentucky, to Sheridan Harry Stanton, a tobacco farmer and barber, and Ersel (née Moberly), a cook. His parents divorced when Stanton was in high school; both later remarried.

Stanton had two older half sisters, Quincy Alice Stanton (Brown) and Lillian Hester Stanton (McKenna) two younger brothers (Ralph and Archie) and a younger half-brother, Stan McKnight). His family had a musical background. Stanton attended Lafayette High School and the University of Kentucky in Lexington, where he performed at the Guignol Theatre under the direction of theater director Wallace Briggs, and studied journalism and radio arts. "I could have been a writer," he told an interviewer for a 2011 documentary, Harry Dean Stanton: Crossing Mulholland, in which he sings and plays the harmonica. "I had to decide if I wanted to be a singer or an actor. I was always singing. I thought if I could be an actor, I could do all of it." Briggs encouraged him to leave the university and become an actor. He studied at the Pasadena Playhouse in Pasadena, California, where his classmates included his friends Tyler MacDuff and Dana Andrews.

During World War II, Stanton served in the United States Navy, including a stint as a cook aboard the USS LST-970, a Landing Ship, Tank, during the Battle of Okinawa.

== Career ==
Stanton made his first television appearance in 1954, with a role in the Inner Sanctum episode "Hour of Darkness". He played Stoneman in the 1959 Have Gun – Will Travel episode "Treasure Trail", credited as Dean Stanton. He made his film debut in the 1957 Western Tomahawk Trail. He appeared (uncredited) as a complaining BAR rifleman at the beginning of the 1959 film Pork Chop Hill, starring Gregory Peck. Then in 1962, he had a very small part in How the West Was Won, portraying one of Charlie Gant's (Eli Wallach) gang. The following year he had a minor role as a poetry-reciting beatnik in The Man from the Diner's Club.

Early in his career, he took the name Dean Stanton to avoid confusion with the actor Harry Stanton.

His breakthrough part came with the lead role in Wim Wenders' Paris, Texas. Playwright Sam Shepard, who wrote the film's script, had spotted Stanton at a bar in Santa Fe, New Mexico, in 1983 while both were attending a film festival in that city. The two fell into conversation. "I was telling him I was sick of the roles I was playing," Stanton recalled in a 1986 interview. "I told him I wanted to play something of some beauty or sensitivity. I had no inkling he was considering me for the lead in his movie." Not long afterward, Shepard phoned him in Los Angeles to offer Stanton the part of the protagonist, Travis, "a role that called for the actor to remain largely silent ... as a lost, broken soul trying to put his life back together and reunite with his estranged family after having vanished years earlier."

Stanton appeared in indie and cult films such as Two-Lane Blacktop (1971), Cockfighter (1974), Escape from New York (1981), Repo Man (1984), The Straight Story (1999), and Inland Empire (2006), as well as mainstream Hollywood productions, including Cool Hand Luke, (1967), Kelly's Heroes (1970), Dillinger (1973), The Godfather Part II (1974), Alien (1979), The Rose (1979), Private Benjamin (1980), Young Doctors in Love (1982), Christine (1983), Red Dawn (1984), One Magic Christmas (1985), Pretty in Pink (1986), The Last Temptation of Christ (1988), Wild at Heart (1990), Down Periscope (1996), Fire Down Below (1997), The Green Mile (1999), The Man Who Cried (2000), Alpha Dog (2006), and Rango (2011). He had eight appearances between 1958 and 1968 on Gunsmoke, four on the network's Rawhide, three on The Untouchables, two on Bonanza, and an episode of The Rifleman. He played the wrongly accused Lucius Brand (credited as Dean Stanton) in The Wild Wild West S3 E7 "The Night of the Hangman" (1967). He later had a cameo in Two and a Half Men (having previously appeared with Jon Cryer in Pretty in Pink and with Charlie Sheen in Red Dawn). Beginning in 2006, Stanton featured as Roman Grant, the manipulative leader/prophet of a polygamous sect on the HBO television series Big Love.

Stanton also occasionally toured nightclubs as a singer and guitarist, playing mostly country-inflected cover tunes. He appeared in the Dwight Yoakam music video for "Sorry You Asked", portrayed a cantina owner in a Ry Cooder video for "Get Rhythm", and participated in the video for Bob Dylan's "Dreamin' of You". He worked with a number of musical artists, Dylan, Art Garfunkel, and Kris Kristofferson among them, and played harmonica on The Call's 1989 album Let the Day Begin.

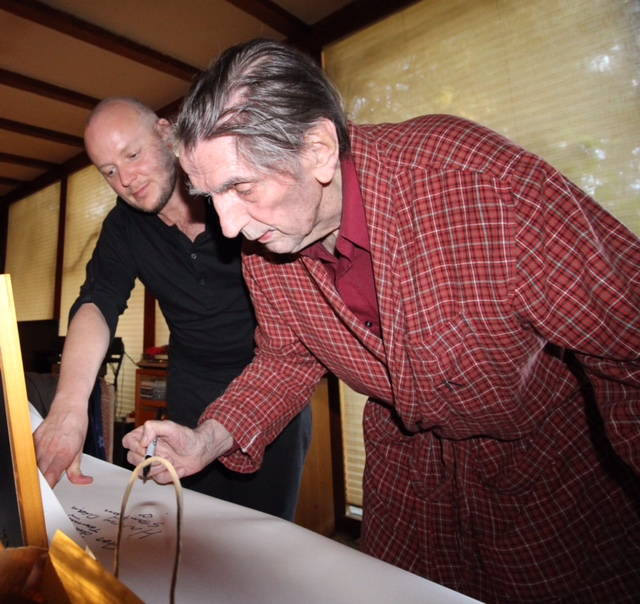
Stanton signing autographs in 2015

In 2010, Stanton appeared in an episode of the TV series Chuck, reprising his role in the 1984 film Repo Man. In 2011, the Lexington Film League created an annual festival, the Harry Dean Stanton Fest, to honor Stanton in the city where he spent much of his adolescence. (Note: The first Harry Dean Stanton Fest was three days of film screenings including Paris, Texas, Repo Man, Cool Hand Luke, and the premiere of a PBS documentary by director Tom Thurman entitled Harry Dean Stanton: Crossing Mulholland. All screenings were held at the historic Kentucky Theater. Hunter Carson, Stanton's co-star in Paris, Texas, attended the festival and conducted a Q&A following the film. The second annual Harry Dean Stanton Fest was held over a weekend in May 2012 at the Kentucky Theater and other venues in downtown Lexington. Festival co-producer Lucy Jones visited with Stanton in California and brought back a filmed greeting for the festival, with introductions to the films and talk about films he was working on. The May 2013 Stanton festival in Lexington included an appearance by Crispin Glover, a co-star with Stanton in Wild at Heart, the 1989 comedy Twister and the Lynch-directed HBO original series Hotel Room in 1993; and a pre-release screening of the documentary Partly Fiction.) In 2012, he had a brief cameo in The Avengers and a key role in the action-comedy Seven Psychopaths. He also appeared in the Arnold Schwarzenegger action film The Last Stand (2013). Stanton was the subject of a 2013 documentary, Harry Dean Stanton: Partly Fiction, directed by Sophie Huber and featuring film clips, interviews with collaborators (including Wenders, Shepard, Kris Kristofferson, and David Lynch), and Stanton's singing.

In 2017, he appeared in Twin Peaks: The Return, a continuation of David Lynch's 1990–91 television series. Stanton reprised his role as Carl Rodd from Twin Peaks: Fire Walk with Me. His last on-screen appearances are as a sheriff in Frank & Ava and a starring role as a 90-year-old man nicknamed 'Lucky' and his struggles against encroaching old age in Lucky.

Stanton was a favorite actor of the directors Sam Peckinpah, John Milius, David Lynch, and Monte Hellman, and was also close friends with Francis Ford Coppola and Jack Nicholson. He was best man at Nicholson's wedding in 1962.

Stanton was a favorite of film critic Roger Ebert, who said that "no movie featuring either Harry Dean Stanton or M. Emmet Walsh in a supporting role can be altogether bad." However, Ebert later admitted that Dream a Little Dream (1989), in which Stanton appeared, was a "clear violation" of this rule.

== Personal life ==
Stanton was never married, though he had a short relationship with actress Rebecca De Mornay from 1981 to 1982. "I might have had two or three [kids] out of marriage," he once told the Associated Press. "But that's another story."

Appearing in the documentary Harry Dean Stanton: Partly Fiction, whilst in conversation with David Lynch, Stanton commented "Two or three times, girls said they were pregnant just out of brief affairs. Sad, sad story. I never had a DNA test, but one kid I'm sure is mine. I never really bonded with the mothers or them. I've just been a loner all my life."

=== Death ===
Stanton died aged 91 on September 15, 2017, from heart failure, at the Cedars-Sinai Medical Center in Los Angeles, California. A small marker containing his cremated remains was established in a cemetery in Nicholasville, Kentucky.

== Legacy ==
=== In popular culture ===
Stanton was celebrated in "I Want That Man", a 1989 song recorded by Deborah Harry which begins with the line "I want to dance with Harry Dean." In her memoir, Harry writes that Stanton heard the song and arranged to meet her at a club in London.

Stanton is mentioned in the 2013 song "Christmas in L.A." by the Killers. The song's music video begins with a dialogue between the voices of Owen Wilson and Harry Dean Stanton.

Pop Will Eat Itself released a track titled "Harry Dean Stanton" on their album The Looks or the Lifestyle? His lead role in the film Paris, Texas, was memorialized in Hayes Carll's 2019 song "American Dream" with the lyrics, "like Harry Dean Stanton on a drive-in screen, a tumbleweed blowing through Paris, Texas, he fell down into the American dream."

Ian McNabb recorded the song "Harry Dean Stanton" on his album Utopian, released in January 2021. McNabb noted the following about the track: "I didn't know too much about him and didn't really want to because I knew I had to write a song using his name as the title, so I wrote these lyrics for and around him – I imagined what it must be like to be him – while dropping some of my own experiences into the narrative. I was lurking around Dylan's "Blind Willie McTell" and "Lenny Bruce" – I wanted that atmosphere. I've never claimed to be original."

Harry Dean Stanton appears in the 2004 documentary Dig!, which chronicles the rivalry between bands The Brian Jonestown Massacre and The Dandy Warhols. He is not the subject of the film, but rather makes a memorable cameo at one of the band's parties.

== Filmography ==
=== Selected credits ===
==== Film ====
- Revolt at Fort Laramie (1957)
- Ride in the Whirlwind (1966)
- Cool Hand Luke (1967)
- Day of the Evil Gun (1968)
- Kelly's Heroes (1970)
- Two-Lane Blacktop (1971)
- Dillinger (1973)
- Pat Garrett & Billy the Kid (1973)
- Where the Lilies Bloom (1974)
- The Godfather Part II (1974)
- Farewell, My Lovely (1975)
- The Missouri Breaks (1976)
- Straight Time (1978)
- Alien (1979)
- The Rose (1979)
- Wise Blood (1979)
- Private Benjamin (1980)
- Escape from New York (1981)
- Christine (1983)
- Repo Man (1984)
- Paris, Texas (1984)
- Red Dawn (1984)
- One Magic Christmas (1985)
- Pretty in Pink (1986)
- The Last Temptation of Christ (1988)
- Wild at Heart (1990)
- Twin Peaks: Fire Walk with Me (1992)
- Down Periscope (1996)
- Fire Down Below (1997)
- Fear and Loathing in Las Vegas (1998)
- The Green Mile (1999)
- The Straight Story (1999)
- The Man Who Cried (2000)
- The Pledge (2001)
- The Wendell Baker Story (2005)
- Alpha Dog (2006)
- Inland Empire (2006)
- This Must Be the Place (2011)
- Rango (2011)
- The Avengers (2012)
- Seven Psychopaths (2012)
- The Last Stand (2013)
- Lucky (2017)

==== Television ====
Year	Title	Role	Notes
1958	Decision	Simeon Dawson	Season 1, Episode 4: "The Tall Man"
1959	U.S. Marshal	Robby Crane	Season 1, Episode 15: "The Diner"
1960	Alfred Hitchcock Presents	Lemon	Season 5, Episode 37: "Escape to Sonoita"
1968	The Virginian	Clint Daggert	Season 7, Episode 8: "Ride to Misadventure"
1969	Petticoat Junction	Ringo	Season 7, Episode 4: "One of Our Chickens is Missing" (credited as Dean Stanton)
1982	Laverne and Shirley	Johnny Velvet	Season 7, Episode 14: "Star Peepers"
1987	Faerie Tale Theatre	Rip Van Winkle	Season 6, Episode 1: "Rip Van Winkle"
2004	Two and a Half Men	Himself	Season 2, Episode 1: "Back Off, Mary Poppins"
2006–2010	Big Love	Roman Grant	37 episodes
2010	Chuck	Harry The Repo Man	Season 4, Episode 1: "Chuck Versus the Anniversary"
2013–2015	Getting On	Leonard Butler	3 episodes
2017	Twin Peaks: The Return	Carl Rodd	5 episodes

== See also ==
- List of actors who have appeared in multiple Palme d'Or winners
