= List of theaters in Kentucky =

Theater venues in Kentucky include:

== Ashland ==
- Paramount Arts Center, a Kentucky landmark on the Historic Register, opened in 1931.

== Bardstown ==
- Stephen Foster - The Musical (formerly The Stephen Foster Story) at My Old Kentucky Home State Park

== Bowling Green ==
- Capitol Arts Center, vaudeville house in the late 1890s, a movie house in the mid-1930s, and today a thriving live performance theatre.

== Danville ==
- Pioneer Playhouse, the oldest outdoor theater in the state
- Norton Center for the Arts, Centre College

== Falmouth ==
- Kincaid Regional Theatre, Northern Kentucky's Only Professional Summer Theatre

== Hopkinsville ==
- Alhambra Theater, a community landmark

== Horse Cave ==
- Kentucky Repertory Theatre (formerly Horse Cave Theatre), also listed on the Historic Register

== Lexington ==
- The Kentucky Theater

== Louisville ==
- The Kentucky Center, the largest performing arts center in Kentucky, featuring touring plays and performances by the Kentucky Opera and the Louisville Ballet
- The Kentucky Shakespeare Festival, presenting free Shakespeare performances every summer in Louisville's Central Park.
- Actors Theatre of Louisville
- The Louisville Palace
- CenterStage at the Jewish Community Center, Community Theatre which began in 1914, features Broadway-style musicals, professional children's theatre, and youth musical theatre training.
- Iroquois Amphitheater
- The Kentucky Theater

== Murray ==
- Playhouse in the Park

== Olive Hill ==
- Olive Hill Center for Arts & Heritage has an active community theater program.

== Paducah ==
- The Market House

== Prestonsburg ==
- Jenny Wiley Theatre
- Mountain Arts Center

== Pine Knob ==
- The Pine Knob Theatre, presenting two plays from 1950s Daddy took the T-Bird Away/Lucy and Ruth's Diner and two from an earlier time period The Legend of Doc Brown and Down in Hoodoo Holler. The plays run from June to September in Pine Knob Kentucky.

== Somerset ==
- Flashback Theater Co.

== See also ==
- Performing arts in Louisville, Kentucky
- Theater in the United States
