= Teddy Abrams =

American songwriter

- Abrams in 2026

Background information
- Born: Edward Paul Maxwell Abrams; May 6, 1987 (age 39)
- Origin: Berkeley, California, U.S.
- Genres: Classical, Jazz, Folk, Klezmer
- Occupation: Conductor/Composer/Instrumentalist
- Instruments: Piano, Clarinet, Organ
- Years active: 1998-present
- Member of: Louisville Orchestra, Britt Festival Orchestra
- Website: www.teddyabrams.com

Edward "Teddy" Paul Maxwell Abrams (born May 6, 1987) is an American conductor, pianist, clarinetist, and composer. He is currently music director of the Louisville Orchestra and previously led the Britt Festival Orchestra.

== Early life and education ==
Abrams was born in Berkeley, California, to non-musician parents, and raised in the San Francisco Bay Area. Abrams is a fourth-generation American. His ancestors immigrated to the US from Russia, Poland, and Hungary. Abrams started improvising on piano at the age of three and began formal lessons at the age of five. At age of eight, Abrams began playing clarinet, in elementary school band, and he developed an interest in conducting, after seeing a San Francisco Symphony performance at age of nine. He began studying conducting and musicianship with Michael Tilson Thomas, the music director of the San Francisco Symphony, at the age of 12.

Abrams never attended middle or high school. Instead, he took general education courses at community colleges in the Bay Area, including Laney College and Foothill College, from age 11 to 16. He then transferred to the San Francisco Conservatory of Music, graduating with a Bachelor of Music at age 18 and studying piano with Paul Hersh and clarinet with David Breeden. In 2005, Abrams entered the Curtis Institute of Music as a conducting major, studying with Otto-Werner Mueller and Ford Lallerstedt. Abrams also studied with David Zinman at the Aspen Music Festival and School. Abrams was the youngest conducting student ever accepted at both Curtis and Aspen.

== Career ==
Teddy's 2017–18 season included debuts with the Los Angeles, Malaysian, and Rhode Island Philharmonics; the Milwaukee, Fort Worth, Princeton, and Omaha Symphonies; and The St. Paul Chamber Orchestra. Recent guest conducting highlights include engagements with the San Francisco, Houston, Vancouver, Colorado, and Phoenix Symphonies; Florida Orchestra; the Louisiana and New Mexico Philharmonics; and at the Kennedy Center. He has a longstanding relationship with the Indianapolis Symphony, and recently conducted them with Time for Three for a special recorded for PBS.

From 2008 to 2011, Abrams was the Conducting Fellow of the New World Symphony in Miami Beach. Abrams has conducted the New World Symphony in Miami Beach, Washington DC, and at Carnegie Hall; his 2009 Education Concerts with the New World Symphony (featuring the world premiere of one of Abrams' own orchestral works) were webcast to hundreds of schools throughout South Florida.

From 2011 to 2012, Abrams served as resident conductor of the MAV Symphony Orchestra in Budapest, Hungary. In 2012, he was appointed assistant conductor of the Detroit Symphony Orchestra, where he conducted the orchestra's neighborhood, community, and education programs. He also helped program its chamber music and contemporary music concerts, and led subscription and pops performances. Abrams served as assistant conductor of the Detroit Symphony from 2012 to 2014.

Abrams performs frequently as a pianist and clarinetist, and he co-founded the Sixth Floor Trio with Harrison Hollingsworth and Johnny Teyssier in 2008. The Trio has performed around the country, establishing residencies in communities in North Carolina, Philadelphia, New York and South Florida; and founded and directed GardenMusic, the music festival of the world-renowned Fairchild Tropical Garden in Miami. The Sixth Floor Trio has served as the resident ensemble for the Knight Foundation's Random Acts of Culture series nationwide having performed more than 260 pop-up performances.

Abrams performed as a keyboardist with the Philadelphia Orchestra, won the 2007 Aspen Composition Contest, and was the assistant conductor of the YouTube Symphony at Carnegie Hall in 2009. He has held residencies at the La Mortella music festival in Ischia, Italy and at the American Academy in Berlin.

Abrams has conducted many orchestras around the world, including the Houston Symphony, Phoenix Symphony, Edmonton Symphony, San Francisco Symphony, Los Angeles Philharmonic, Indianapolis Symphony, Florida Orchestra, Jacksonville Symphony, Louisiana Philharmonic, Detroit Symphony, National Symphony Orchestra, and New Mexico Philharmonic.

As the music director and conductor for the Britt Music & Arts Festival Orchestra, Abrams was designated to lead approximately 40 Britt Orchestra musicians in the performances at Crater Lake National Park in July 2016. The project was funded by the National Endowment for the Arts project "Imagine Your Parks", which celebrated the centennial of the National Parks.

In June 2016, Abrams composed and recorded "Float Rumble Rest" as a tribute to Muhammad Ali and a benefit for the Muhammad Ali Center in Louisville. The song features My Morning Jacket's Jim James on guitar.

=== Louisville Orchestra ===
As Music Director of The Louisville Orchestra, Abrams' mission has been to make broad, inclusive music available to everyone in the community by undertaking ambitious creative projects, and developing a large body of commissioned works. Abrams and The Louisville Orchestra have collaborated with the Louisville Ballet, Aoife O'Donovan, Rachel Grimes, Chase Morrin, Mason Bates, Béla Fleck, and hundreds of Louisville community musicians for Leonard Bernstein's Mass.

Abrams debuted more than 10 world premieres of major works in his first two seasons with The Louisville Orchestra. The 2017 world premiere of Abrams' own composition, Muhammad Ali Portrait, as part of a two-week Festival of American Music that also featured guest conductor Michael Tilson Thomas.

=== Film and video ===
Music Makes a City Now is a PBS web series that followed Abrams and The Louisville Orchestra through the first two seasons of his tenure.

== Compositions ==
- Unified Field (2016) for orchestra
- Overture In Sonata Form (2014) for orchestra
- Still Standing (2014) for voice and orchestra
- Kentucky Royal Fanfare (2015) for brass ensemble
- Fiddling (2015) for string orchestra
- Questions (2015) for voice and orchestra
- Schubertiade (2015) for violin or two violins and piano or orchestra
- Rye Smooth (2015) for jazz ensemble
- Actuality (2014) for piano or ensemble
- Seconds (2015) for jazz ensemble
- Romance (2015) for contrabass and orchestra
- The Well And The Road (2014) for voice and orchestra
- Rock (2012) for clarinet, bassoon, and piano
- Sixth Floor (2007) for clarinet, bassoon, violin, bass, vibraphone, drumset, piano
- Bassoon Sonata (2007) for bassoon and piano
- Piano Concerto (2022)

== Awards ==
- 2007 Aspen Composition Contest
- 2016 Louisville Fund for the Arts Innovation Award
- 2024 Grammy for Best Classical Instrumental Solo for The American Project

== Discography ==
- The Order of Nature – (Jim James with Teddy Abrams and the Louisville Orchestra) (2019)
