= Robert Whitney (conductor) =

American conductor (1904–1986)

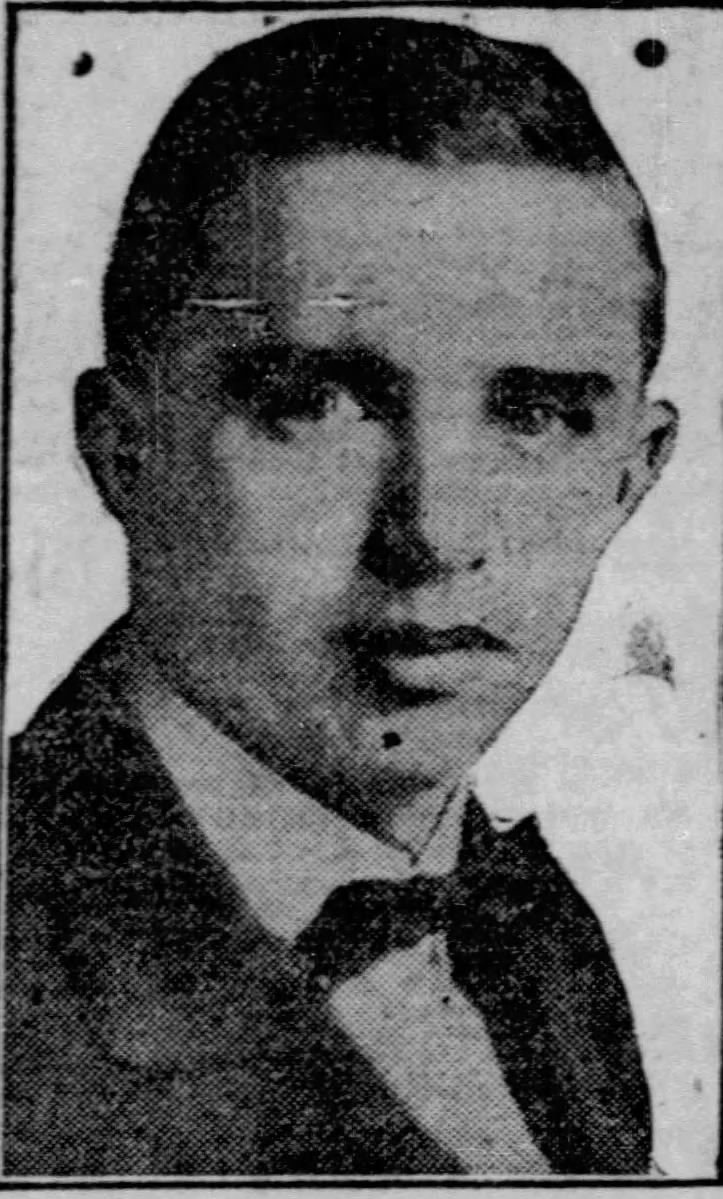
Whitney as a radio announcer in 1925

Robert Sutton Whitney (July 9, 1904 – November 22, 1986) was an American conductor and composer. He was a student of Leo Sowerby.

Robert Whitney was best known for founding, in November 1937, together with the mayor of Louisville, Kentucky the Louisville Orchestra, and becoming its first conductor, a post he held until 1967. (Its original name was the "Louisville Civic Arts Association," which was later changed to the "Louisville Philharmonic Society." The orchestra finally adopted its current name after it filed an amendment to its articles of incorporation in 1977.) His concerto grosso had earlier (1934) been performed by the Chicago Symphony Orchestra.

Whitney also served as dean of the School of Music of the University of Louisville, from 1956 to 1971.

He was a National Patron of Delta Omicron, an international professional music fraternity.

Whitney Hall, the largest performance venue in The Kentucky Center for the Performing Arts is named for him.
