= Kentucky Opera =

American opera company in Louisville, Kentucky

The Kentucky Opera is an American opera company based in Louisville, Kentucky. The company is resident at the Brown Theatre, as part of Kentucky Performing Arts. The Louisville Orchestra is the accompanying orchestra for the company.

Moritz von Bomhard founded the company in 1952 as the State Opera of Kentucky. The company performed in the Columbia Auditorium until 1964, when they moved to the Macauley Theater (now called the Brown Theatre). Bomhard served as general director of the company until his 1982 retirement. Thomson Smillie succeeded Bomhard as general director, and during his tenure, the company began to give some performances at Whitney Hall in 1984. Smillie was general director until 1997. In 1998, Deborah Sandler became the company's general director. During her tenure, the company moved all of its productions to Whitney Hall.

In January 2006, the company announced David Roth as its next general director. Roth served in the post until his July 2015 death in a car accident. Following interim leadership by William Blodgett, in 2016, Ian Derrer became the company's general director. Barbara Lynne Jamison was named general director in 2018.
