= Kentucky Theatre (Lexington) =

Movie theater in Lexington, Kentucky, United States

- The theater's facade with marquee glowing at night.
- Interactive map of Kentucky Theatre
- Location: 214 East Main Street; Lexington, Kentucky
- Coordinates: 38.04443°N 84.49516°W
- Owner: Lexington-Fayette Urban County Government
- Operator: Friends of the Kentucky Theatre
- Capacity: 816
- Type: Indoor movie theatre

Construction
- Groundbreaking: October 1921
- Opened: October 4, 1922
- Renovated: 1987–1992

Website
- https://www.kentuckytheatre.org/

The Kentucky Theatre is a historic cinema in downtown Lexington, Kentucky, United States, that first opened in October 1922. The building is currently owned by the Lexington-Fayette Urban County Government and leased to a non-profit that shows films, and hosts concerts and events. The theater's schedule emphasizes foreign, independent, and art films, although more typical Hollywood movies are occasionally shown, as well. It is one of a few remaining movie palaces in the United States.

Each summer, the Kentucky Theatre hosts a Summer Classics series, showing a different classic film each Wednesday throughout the summer. Most films in the series are paired as one-night double-features or shown with an accompanying cartoon. These also include performances by organists part of the Bluegrass Chapter of the American Theatre Organ Society, which include classic and modern pieces and a sing-along before the show.

== History ==
Following extensive damage in 1987, from a fire in an adjacent restaurant, the theater was closed. Over the next five years, a number of renovations were conducted and the grand reopening was held on April 11, 1992.

In the late 1990s, the city renovated and reopened the adjoining theater. It is referred to informally as the State Theatre, although it is operated as a second screen for the Kentucky. The State was a long-time venue for the Woodsongs Old-Time Radio Hour which now plays at the Lyric theater.

In 2000, the Kentucky and its manager Fred Mills found themselves embroiled in controversy over the showing of an X-rated film entitled Disco Dolls in Hot Skin. Undercover officers confiscated the film and Mills was charged with distributing obscene material. The theater filed suit and the film was returned. Mills' charges were dismissed upon arraignment, and the Lexington city council voted 11 to 4 against holding a review on the issue. The phrase "Defend the First Amendment" was put onto the marquee after the incident.

In 2020, the Kentucky was shuttered due to the COVID-19 pandemic. The Lexington-Fayette Urban County Government terminated the operating contract with The Kentucky Theatre Group, Inc. at the company's request.

In September 2021, the Mayor recommended that the management contract be given to the Friends of the Kentucky Theatre, a non-profit 501(c)(3). In January 2022, the theater reopened under the direction of the Friends of the Kentucky Theatre.

== See also ==
- Theater in Kentucky
