= USS LST-970 =

1944 LST-542-class tank landing ship

Coordinates: 33.329885°S 60.208885°W

History

United States
- Name: LST-970
- Builder: Bethlehem-Hingham Shipyard, Hingham, Massachusetts
- Yard number: 3440
- Laid down: 14 November 1944
- Launched: 16 December 1944
- Commissioned: 13 January 1945
- Decommissioned: 10 July 1946
- Stricken: 15 August 1946
- Identification: Hull symbol: LST-970; Code letters: NKIT
- Honors and awards: 1 × battle star
- Fate: Sold for operations, 25 April 1947

United States
- Name: New York
- Owner: American Overseas Chartering; Trailerships, Inc.
- Route: New York City to Albany, New York
- Acquired: 25 April 1947
- Out of service: September 1955
- Fate: Confiscated by US Marshals, September 1955

United States
- Name: New York
- Owner: McAllister Brothers
- Acquired: September 1955
- Fate: Sold, March 1957

United States
- Name: Old Point Comfort
- Owner: Chesapeake Bay Ferry District
- Acquired: March 1957
- Fate: Sold

United States
- Name: Old Point Comfort
- Owner: Chesapeake Bridge and Tunnel District
- Fate: Sold, 16 December 1964

Uruguay
- Name: Atlantico
- Owner: Navegacion, Atlantida, S.A.
- Route: Buenos Aires, Argentina and Colonia del Sacramento, Uruguay
- Acquired: 16 December 1964
- Identification: IMO number: 5262081
- Fate: Abandoned c. 1993–1994

General characteristics
- Class & type: LST-542-class tank landing ship
- Displacement: 1,625 long tons (1,651 t) (light); 4,080 long tons (4,145 t) (full (seagoing draft with 1,675 short tons (1,520 t) load); 2,366 long tons (2,404 t) (beaching)
- Length: 328 ft (100 m) oa
- Beam: 50 ft (15 m)
- Draft: Unloaded: 2 ft 4 in (0.71 m) forward; 7 ft 6 in (2.29 m) aft; Full load: 8 ft 3 in (2.51 m) forward; 14 ft 1 in (4.29 m) aft; Landing with 500 short tons (450 t) load: 3 ft 11 in (1.19 m) forward; 9 ft 10 in (3.00 m) aft; Limiting 11 ft 2 in (3.40 m); Maximum navigation 14 ft 1 in (4.29 m)
- Installed power: 2 × 900 hp (670 kW) Electro-Motive Diesel 12-567A diesel engines; 1,800 shp (1,300 kW)
- Propulsion: 1 × Falk main reduction gears; 2 × Propellers
- Speed: 11.6 kn (21.5 km/h; 13.3 mph)
- Range: 24,000 nmi (44,000 km; 28,000 mi) at 9 kn (17 km/h; 10 mph) while displacing 3,960 long tons (4,024 t)
- Boats & landing craft carried: 2 x LCVPs
- Capacity: 1,600–1,900 short tons (3,200,000–3,800,000 lb; 1,500,000–1,700,000 kg) cargo depending on mission
- Troops: 16 officers, 147 enlisted men
- Complement: 13 officers, 104 enlisted men
- Armament: Varied, ultimate armament; 2 × twin 40 mm (1.57 in) Bofors guns; 4 × single 40 mm Bofors guns; 12 × 20 mm (0.79 in) Oerlikon cannons

Service record
- Part of: LST Flotilla 31
- Operations: Assault and occupation of Okinawa Gunto (21 May–30 June 1945)
- Awards: China Service Medal; American Campaign Medal; Asiatic–Pacific Campaign Medal; World War II Victory Medal; Navy Occupation Service Medal w/Asia Clasp

USS LST-970 was an LST-542-class tank landing ship in the United States Navy. Like many of her class, she was not named and is properly referred to by her hull designation.

== Construction ==
LST-970 was laid down on 14 November 1944, at Hingham, Massachusetts, by the Bethlehem-Hingham Shipyard; launched on 16 December 1944; sponsored by Major Anne B. Cowan, WAC; and commissioned on 13 January 1945.

== Service history ==
During World War II, LST-970 was assigned to the Asiatic-Pacific theater and participated the assault and occupation of Okinawa Gunto in May and June 1945.

Following the war, she performed occupation duty in the Far East and saw service in China until late February. She returned to the United States and was decommissioned on 10 July 1946, and struck from the Navy list on 15 August, that same year. On 25 April 1947, the ship was sold to Trailerships, Inc., for operation.

== Awards ==
LST-970 earned one battle star for World War II service.

== Notable crew ==
Character actor Harry Dean Stanton was assigned to the 970 for the whole of his wartime service.

== Bibliography ==
Online resources

- "LST-970". Dictionary of American Naval Fighting Ships. Naval History and Heritage Command. This article incorporates text from this source, which is in the public domain.
- "Bethlehem-Hingham, Hingham MA". www.ShipbuildingHistory.com. 11 August 2011.
- "USS LST-970". NavSource. 27 May 2016.
