= Macauley's Theatre =

Coordinates: 38°15′04.9″N 85°45′24.0″W

Macauley's Theatre was the premier theatre in Louisville, Kentucky during the late 19th and early 20th century. It opened on October 18, 1873, on the north side of Walnut Street between Third and Fourth Streets, and was founded by Bernard "Barney" Macauley, a prominent Louisville actor since the 1850s. The theater was designed by architect John B. McElfatrick. It opened with the comedy Extremes. Debts forced him to sell the playhouse to his brother John in 1879.

The theatre was a success under John Macauley, featuring the top actors of the day, such as Sarah Bernhardt, Lillie Langtry, Edwin Booth, George M. Cohan and showman Buffalo Bill. Louisvillian Mary Anderson made her debut at the theatre in 1875 while the actress Alice Oates and her company appeared there four times between 1876 and 1879.

With changing times, Macauleys began to occasionally show motion pictures in the 1910s. It continued to serve as Louisville's premier live theatre however, until it was razed in 1925. The final performance was of The Naughty Wife on August 29, 1925. Theatre in Louisville lived on at the 1,400-seat Brown Theatre, which opened in 1925 and rechristened as The Macauley Theatre from 1971 to 1998. Before closing its doors in 1998, the world renowned jam band Phish played two different shows across a four-month period in 1993, which is unheard of in today's music wheelhouse.

Macauley's lobby was decorated with pictures of the famous actors and actresses who had performed there, many with personal inscriptions and dedications. When the theatre closed, these were donated to the University of Louisville, which still includes them in their archives.
