= Fund for the Arts =

The Fund for the Arts is a united arts fund in Louisville, Kentucky, United States.

Mayor Charles R. Farnsley, served as mayor of the City of Louisville from 1948 to 1953, and first conceived of the Fund for the Arts in 1949. He based its structure on that of the Community Chest, now known as United Way. The 2011 campaign raised more than $7.3 million, an increase from its first campaign in 1949, of $99,000. The Fund currently provides financing, facilities and administrative support for twenty-nine Louisville area arts groups and programs. In addition, it awards over 200 community access grants annually to community groups and schools in Kentucky and Southern Indiana. Other Fund sponsored activities include the annual Whittenberg Young Artist Scholarship. Conceived of and directed by the Fund for the Arts, ArtSpace, the W.L. Lyons Brown Theatre and the Fifth Third Conference Center are owned by the Fund for the Arts Properties Foundation, Inc., a Fund for the Arts partner corporation.

For 35 years, the Fund for the Arts was headed by president and CEO, Allan Cowen, who retired in 2012. Barbara Sexton Smith, was named president and CEO in April 2012 and announced her retirement as of June, 2014.

== See also ==
- Performing arts in Louisville, Kentucky
