= Louisville Orchestra =

Classical orchestra in Louisville, Kentucky

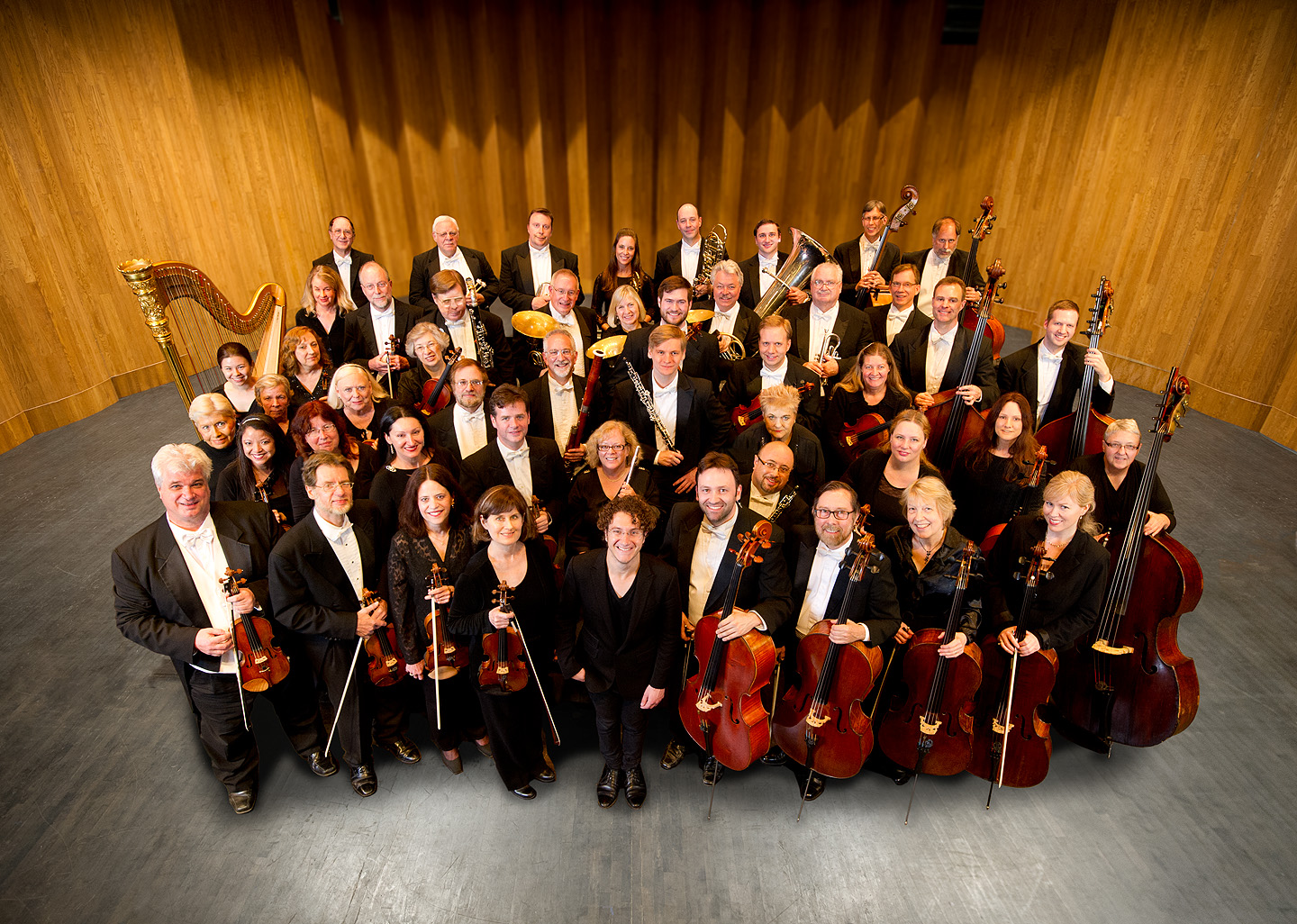
- Former name: Louisville Philharmonic Society
- Founded: 1937
- Location: Louisville, Kentucky
- Concert hall: Kentucky Center for the Performing Arts
- Music director: Teddy Abrams
- Website: louisvilleorchestra.org

The Louisville Orchestra is the primary orchestra in Louisville, Kentucky. It was founded in 1937 by Robert Whitney (1904–1986). The Louisville Orchestra employs salaried musicians, and offers a wide variety of concert series to the community, including classical programs featuring international guest artists, pops performances, and education and family concerts. In 1942 the orchestra adopted the name of the former Louisville Philharmonic Society (founded in 1866), which it kept until 1977 before reverting to its original name. The orchestra is the resident performing group for the Louisville Ballet and the Kentucky Opera, and presents several concerts across the Kentucky/Indiana area.

The orchestra performs its concerts at Whitney Hall (named for its founder) in the Kentucky Center for the Arts and The Brown Theatre. The current music director of the Louisville Orchestra is Teddy Abrams, who began his tenure in 2014.

== First Edition Recordings ==
Ten years after its origin, the orchestra launched First Edition Records, becoming the first American orchestra to own a recording label. In 1953, the orchestra received a Rockefeller grant of $500,000 to commission, record and premiere 20th-century music by living composers, placing the Louisville Orchestra on the international circuit. Between 1955 and 1992 at least 170 LPs were released, containing more than 450 compositions by living 20th Century composers.

Eight compact discs were compiled and released by First Edition Records between 1990 and 1994. Around 1999, the Louisville Orchestra was awarded grants from the Aaron Copland Fund for Music and the National Endowment for the Arts, both for the purpose of digitizing all of their master tapes and restoring the music scores for archiving the orchestra's historic first edition Records recordings. Between 2001 and 2006 some 55 of the recordings were compiled by composer and re-released on CD on the First Edition Music label, which was not part of First Edition Records. The label ceased operations in 2006.

== Awards and recognition ==
The Louisville Orchestra has earned nineteen ASCAP awards for Adventurous Programming of Contemporary Music. The history of commissioned works project is detailed in the documentary film Music Makes a City. The Louisville Orchestra has performed for many events including "A Festival for the Arts" at the White House, the Inter-American Music Festival at the Kennedy Center, "Great Orchestras of the World" at Carnegie Hall, and toured Mexico City. In 2001, the Louisville Orchestra received the Leonard Bernstein Award for Excellence in Educational Programming, presented annually by ASCAP and the American Symphony Orchestra League to one orchestra in North America.

== Music directors of the Louisville Orchestra ==
- Robert Whitney (1937–1967)
- Jorge Mester (1967–1979)
- John Nelson, artistic advisor (1979–1980)
- Akira Endo (1980–1982)
- Lawrence Leighton Smith (1983–1994)
- Joseph Silverstein, artistic advisor (1994–1995)
- Max Bragado-Darman (1994–1998)
- Uri Segal (1998–2004) Uri Segal
- Raymond Leppard served as artistic advisor (2004–2006)
- Jorge Mester (2006–2014)
- Teddy Abrams (2014–present)

== See also ==
- List of symphony orchestras
- List of attractions and events in the Louisville metropolitan area
