= Kentucky Theater =

Former movie theater in Louisville, Kentucky

Coordinates: 38.247213°N 85.758162°W

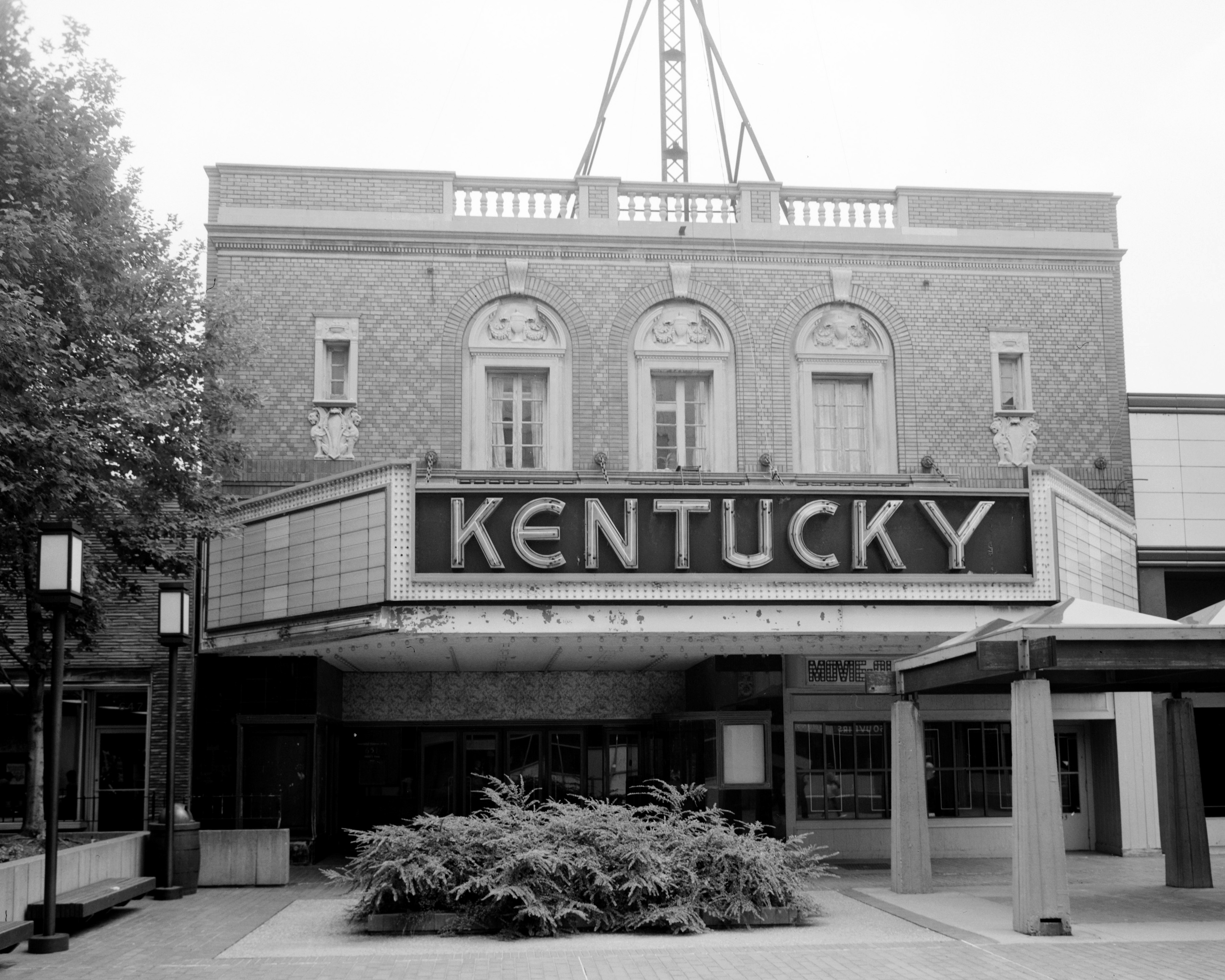
- Exterior of venue in undated photo
- Interactive map of Kentucky Theater
- Address: 651 S. 4th St.
- Location: Downtown Louisville
- Type: 1921
- Current use: Kentucky Theater Shops

The Kentucky Theater was a theater and performing arts center at 651 S. 4th St., located in the theater district of downtown Louisville, Kentucky in the United States of America.

Built in 1921, the building served for sixty years as a movie house. The movie house closed in 1986, and was almost scheduled for demolition until a local entrepreneur bought it at auction and turned it over to two arts advocates who created a non-profit arts organization, called the Kentucky Theater Project, Inc. The newly renovated Kentucky Theater opened its doors in 2000 and is now a community arts center and art film house. In 2008, the Kentucky Theater was renovated into the Kentucky Theater Shops. It now includes a gourmet food shop, a wine and spirits shop, a bagel shop and a florist shop.

== See also ==
- List of attractions and events in the Louisville metropolitan area
- Theater in Kentucky
