= Louisville Ballet =

American dance company and school

The Louisville Ballet is a ballet school and professional ballet company based in Louisville, Kentucky. It is the official state ballet of the Commonwealth of Kentucky. The Ballet was established in 1952 and currently employs 25 professional dancers. As of 2025, the company is led by new Artistic Director Anthony Krutzkamp and CEO Leslie Smart.

== History ==
The Louisville Ballet is a professional ballet company and school based in Louisville, Kentucky. The organization was incorporated in December 1951 under its first artistic director, Thomas Jordan, and gave its first production in March 1952. In its early years, the company was sponsored by the Louisville Dance Council, a nonprofit organization founded in 1949 under Estelle Volin, a modern dance instructor at the University of Louisville. The company initially did not maintain a permanent roster of dancers; performers auditioned for individual productions, rehearsed in borrowed spaces, and supplied their own costumes and shoes.

In April 1960, the organization changed its name to the Louisville Civic Ballet, reflecting an increased emphasis on local dancers. That year, dancers began auditioning for membership in the company rather than for individual productions. The company began an annual production of The Nutcracker in 1963.

In 1965, Larry Gradus was engaged as the company's first full-time resident artistic director. Around 1970, Nels Jorgensen became artistic director. The organization changed its name to the Louisville Ballet Company in 1970.

In 1973, dancers Richard Munro and Cristina Stirling became artistic directors. During their tenure, the organization moved toward establishing a permanent professional company and training program.

The Academy of the Louisville Ballet, now known as the Louisville Ballet School, was established in 1975 by Munro and Stirling with Alun Jones and Helen Starr. Jones initially served as associate director of the academy, while Starr taught at the academy and appeared as a guest dancer with the company.

In 1976, Louisville Ballet hired eight contracted dancers, marking its transition from a civic organization to a professional ballet company.

Alun Jones era

Munro and Stirling left Louisville Ballet in 1978, and Alun Jones became artistic director. His wife, Helen Starr, became the company's principal dancer and subsequently also served as associate artistic director and répétiteur.

Jones remained artistic director for 24 years, from 1978 until his retirement in 2002. During his tenure, Louisville Ballet presented 78 world premieres and 65 Louisville premieres. Jones also choreographed, directed, and designed productions for the company, including versions of Romeo and Juliet, Cinderella, Peter Pan, The Merry Widow, and Lucy.

Louisville Ballet developed a notable association with Mikhail Baryshnikov during this period. Baryshnikov first performed with the company in Louisville in 1978, dancing with Starr, and returned in 1979. In 1981, he invited Louisville Ballet to perform with him during engagements in Houston and Dallas.

In 1993, Louisville Ballet moved from its former location at 1300 Bardstown Road to its headquarters at 315 East Main Street in downtown Louisville.

Jones established the company's Choreographers' Showcase in 1994, providing company dancers with opportunities to create choreography. The program later became a recurring part of Louisville Ballet's repertory.

Louisville native Wendy Whelan, who became a principal dancer with New York City Ballet, returned to perform with Louisville Ballet during the 1994–95 season. She later returned for performances in 2002, 2006, 2009, and 2012.

Starr retired as a principal dancer in 1998 after 22 seasons with the company. In addition to her performing career, she served Louisville Ballet as associate artistic director and répétiteur.

Bruce Simpson era

Jones retired in 2002 and was succeeded as artistic director by Bruce Simpson.

Simpson continued the company's emphasis on both classical repertory and new choreography. During his tenure, the Choreographers' Showcase, which had been established by Jones, became a regular component of the company's programming.

In 2009, Louisville Ballet premiered a new production of The Nutcracker, known as The Brown-Forman Nutcracker.

Simpson served as artistic director until 2014.

Robert Curran era

Robert Curran, a former principal dancer with The Australian Ballet, was appointed artistic director in 2014 following an international search.

During Curran's tenure, Louisville Ballet presented a mixture of classical productions, contemporary choreography, new commissions, and works by established and emerging choreographers. His tenure also included programming and organizational changes associated with the COVID-19 pandemic and the company's subsequent return to live performance.

Curran left Louisville Ballet in 2023.

Following his departure, former artistic director Bruce Simpson and former associate artistic director Helen Starr returned to the organization as interim artistic advisors.

Mikelle Bruzina and Harald Uwe Kern

In 2023, longtime Louisville Ballet artists Mikelle Bruzina and Harald Uwe Kern were appointed artistic directors.

Both had held a number of artistic positions within the organization before their appointments. Bruzina had performed with the company and subsequently served as ballet mistress and in artistic leadership roles associated with the Louisville Ballet Studio Company. Kern had served as a dancer, ballet master, and senior ballet master.

Bruzina served as artistic director for two seasons and subsequently became Louisville Ballet's senior rehearsal director.

Anthony Krutzkamp era

In August 2025, Louisville Ballet announced the appointment of Anthony Krutzkamp as artistic director following a national search. His appointment became effective October 1, 2025.

Krutzkamp had previously served as artistic director and later artistic and executive director of Sacramento Ballet. Before entering arts administration, he performed as a principal dancer with Cincinnati Ballet and subsequently held artistic, teaching, and administrative positions with several dance organizations.

Under Krutzkamp, Louisville Ballet announced its 75th Anniversary Season for 2026–27. The season included Hamlet & Ophelia, Frankenstein, The Brown-Forman Nutcracker, Carmen, Bourbon & Ballet, and Momentum.

In 2026, the company also established the Commonwealth Choreography Award, an international annual award supporting the creation and premiere of a new choreographic work. The program provides $100,000 toward the selected project, including a $25,000 honorarium for the selected choreographer.

Artistic leadership

Years

Artistic leader

Position

1951–

Thomas Jordan

First artistic director

1965–

Larry Gradus

Resident artistic director

c. 1970–1973

Nels Jorgensen

Artistic director

1973–1978

Richard Munro and Cristina Stirling

Artistic directors

1978–2002

Alun Jones

Artistic director

Jones era

Helen Starr

Associate artistic director and répétiteur

2002–2014

Bruce Simpson

Artistic director

2014–2023

Robert Curran

Artistic director

2023

Bruce Simpson and Helen Starr

Interim artistic advisors

2023–2025

Mikelle Bruzina and Harald Uwe Kern

Artistic directors

2025–present

Anthony Krutzkamp

Artistic director

== Description and school ==
The company presents full-length ballets each year, which have included Swan Lake, The Sleeping Beauty, Coppelia, Romeo and Juliet, Cinderella, Giselle and Don Quixote. Additionally, Choreographer Val Caniparoli created the Brown-Forman Nutcracker, now an annual tradition for the Louisville Ballet.

As of 2025, the professional company is made up of 25 dancers and has a $5.5 million yearly budget. The 2025–2026 season is titled "Favorites + Fantasies" and will include performances of Dracula and Swan Lake. The following season, 2026–2027, will be the 75th anniversary season for the company.

Most of the company's productions are accompanied by the Louisville Orchestra. The company performs at three venues in the city: The Brown Theatre, The Kentucky Center, and the Louisville Ballet Main Studio.

The Louisville Ballet School is connected with the professional company and serves as its official school. The school has a Youth Ensemble that performs with the professional company. Members of this program have joined many different professional companies. Additionally, many lower level programs as well as options for adults are offered within the school. The school also offers summer intensive programming. The school provides training to over 900 students. The Louisville Ballet Studio Company offers a level between the school and the professional company. This four-year, free program can allow dancers to build skills and work toward a professional career.

The Louisville Ballet can be found on East Main Street housed in a $2.2 million building that contains both studios and offices. The American Institute of Architects gave this building the Honor Award for Excellence in Architectural Design. The Ballet's building was also featured in Architecture.
