= The Kentucky Center =

Performing arts center in Louisville, Kentucky, United States

The Kentucky Center for the Performing Arts
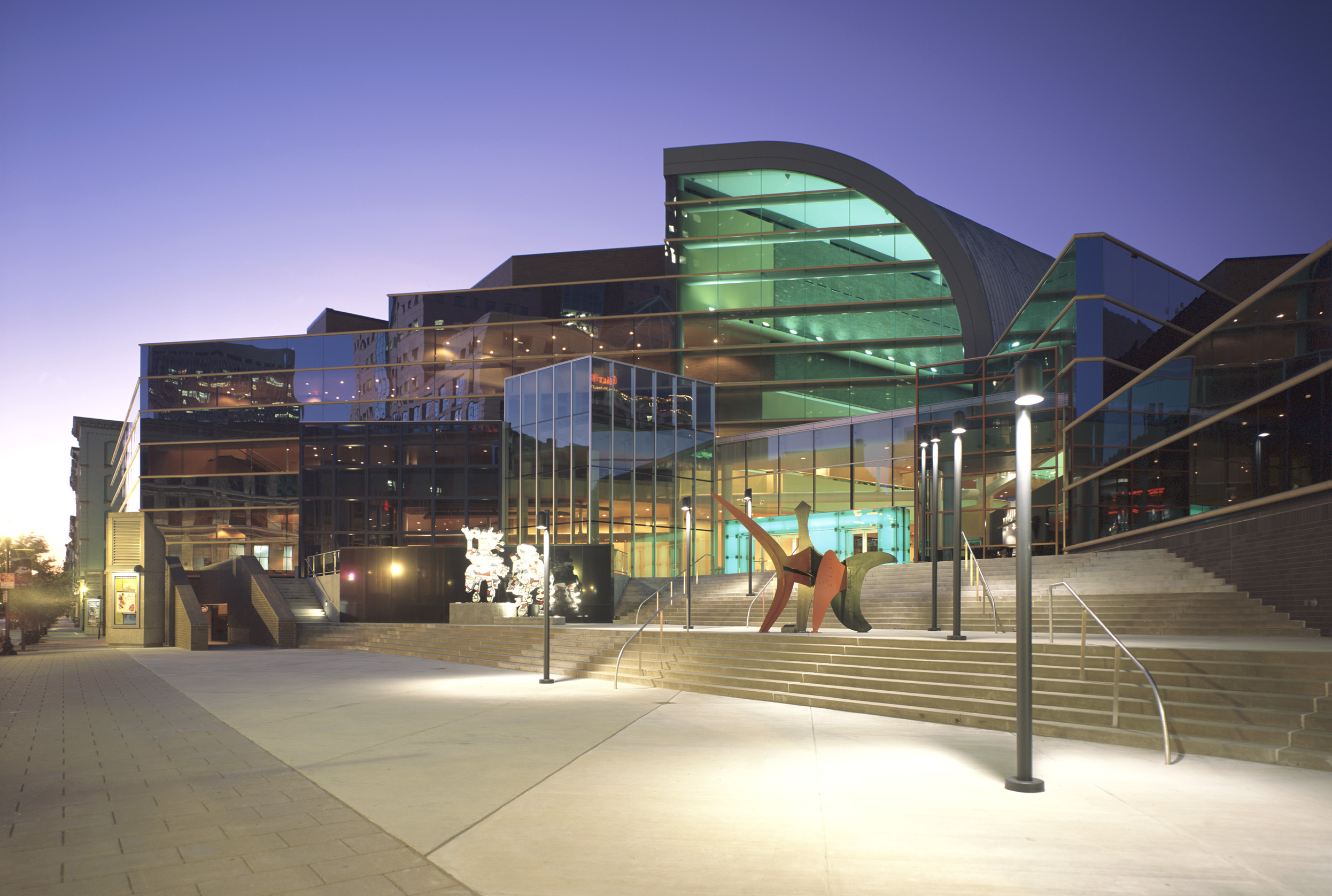
- Interactive map of The Kentucky Center for the Performing Arts
- Address: 501 West Main Street; Louisville, Kentucky; United States
- Coordinates: 38°15′26.3″N 85°45′31.7″W
- Capacity: Robert S. Whitney Hall: 2,406; Moritz von Bomhard Theatre: 619; Boyd Martin Theatre: 139
- Type: performing arts center

Construction
- Opened: November 19, 1983
- Architect: Caudill Rowlett Scott

Tenants
- Broadway Across America, Kentucky Opera, Louisville Ballet, Louisville Orchestra, Stage One

Website
- www.kentuckyperformingarts.org

The Kentucky Center for the Performing Arts in Louisville, Kentucky, which opened in 1983, is owned by Kentucky Performing Arts and has tenants that include Kentucky Opera, Louisville Ballet, the Louisville Orchestra, StageOne Family Theatre and Broadway Across America. Sculptural artwork at the site is by Alexander Calder, Joan Miró, John Chamberlain, Jean Dubuffet and others.

The center was dedicated on November 19, 1983. Attendees included Charlton Heston, Diane Sawyer and Lily Tomlin. In 1984 the center hosted one of the U.S. presidential election debates between Ronald Reagan and Walter Mondale.

== Performance spaces ==
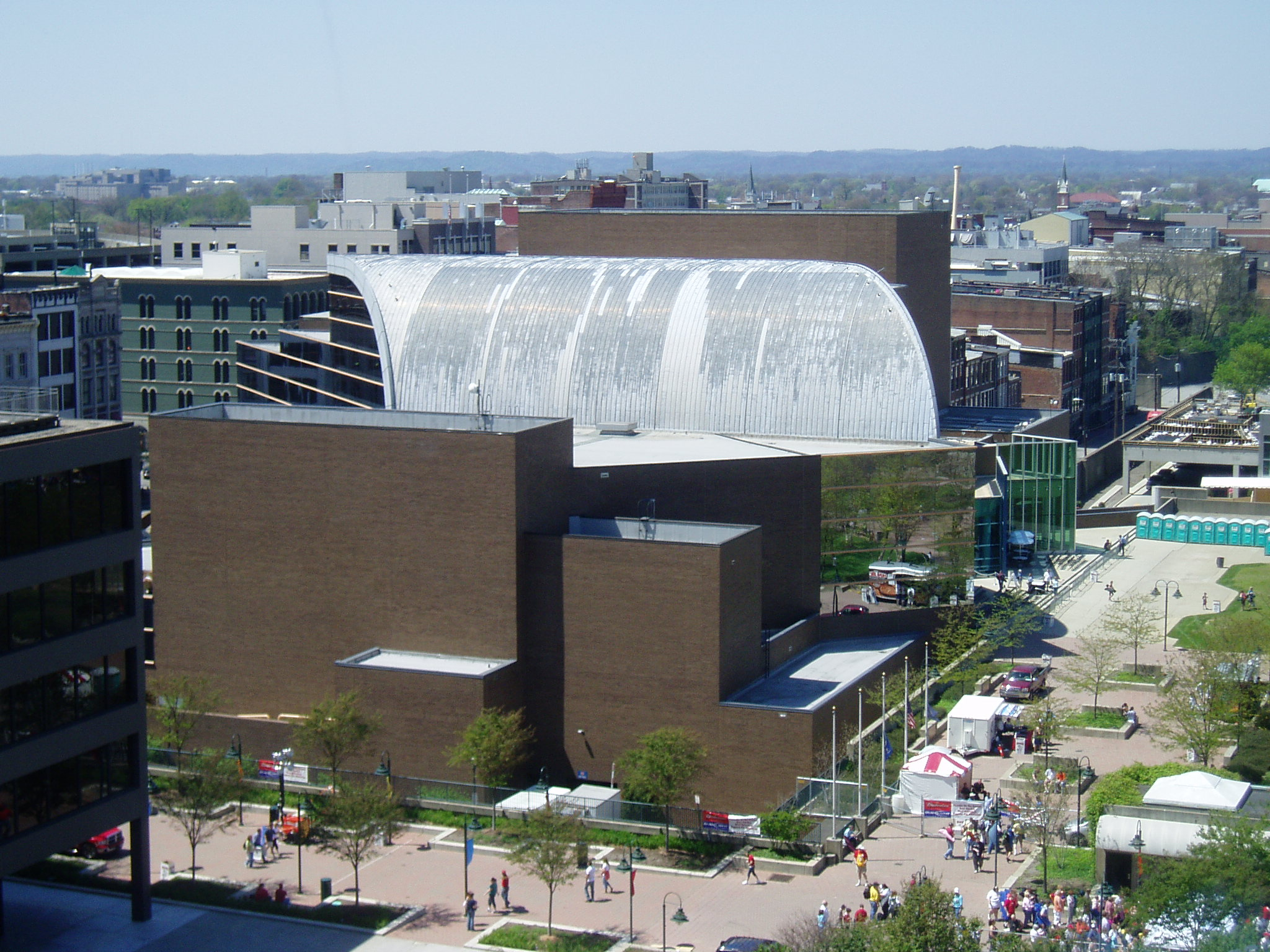
The Kentucky Center building

The Kentucky Center has three performance spaces:

- Robert S. Whitney Hall, with 2,406 seats, is the largest and named after the founding conductor of the Louisville Orchestra, Robert S. Whitney.
- Moritz von Bomhard Theatre, with 619 seats is named for the founder of the Kentucky Opera, Moritz von Bomhard. The Moritz von Bomhard Theatre features a M1D Meyer Sound system for sound reinforcement.
- Boyd Martin Theatre, with 139 seats is also known as "The MeX" . Named for a film and theater critic who wrote for the Louisville Courier-Journal: Boyd Martin.

== Kentucky Performing Arts ==
The Kentucky Center is one of three venues owned by Kentucky Performing Arts:

- Brown Theatre, with 1,400 seats, is named for industrialist James Graham Brown, and is located eight blocks away on Broadway, between Third and Fourth Streets. The Brown was completed in 1925, and is modeled on the Music Box Theatre in New York City.
- Paristown Hall opened in July 2019 and is located in the Paristown Pointe neighborhood east of downtown. It is a standing-only venue with a capacity of 2,000, and features a patio, balcony area, and bars.

Its stages are only a part of what the Kentucky Performing Arts does throughout Kentucky. For example, the center has an education department, with programs for children and adults that travel into all corners of Kentucky. Programs include:

- ArtsReach: Collaborates with community centers in Louisville, Hopkinsville, Ashland, Mt. Sterling, Cadiz, Lexington, Owensboro, and Paducah to provide arts programs, with a strong emphasis on hands-on experiences.
- Governor's School for the Arts: Over 200 of Kentucky's most promising young artists come together for three weeks of interaction, training, and artistic exploration each summer.
- Gheens Great Expectations Project: This partnership with the Gheens Foundation and the Fund for the Arts presents young classical musicians in concert and in community residencies.

Kentucky Performing Arts also administers programs that assist and teach teachers in bringing the arts into the classroom, such as:

- Arts Academies: The Kentucky Center provides one-week Arts Academies for Kentucky's public school teachers at six sites across the Commonwealth each summer.
- Kentucky Institute for Arts in Education: This two-week professional development seminar involves teachers in creative writing, dance, drama, music, and visual arts.
- Arts Education Showcase: At a showcase held as part of the Kentucky Teaching and Learning Conference, educators and members of the public can see prescreened artists and performers whose arts education programs are available for students.

Kentucky Performing Arts also provides access services that make the theater experience possible for patrons with disabilities. Kentucky Performing Arts also provides consultancy services to many of the performing arts centers across Kentucky, including:

- Actors Theatre of Louisville (Jefferson County)
- Plaza Theatre (Barren County)
- Paramount Arts Center (Boyd County)
- Alhambra Theatre (Christian County)
- RiverPark Center (Daviess County)
- Hardin County Playhouse (Hardin County)
- Singletary Center for the Arts at the University of Kentucky (Fayette County)
- Four Rivers Arts Center (McCracken County)
- Capitol Arts Center (Warren County)
- Jenny Wiley Theatre (Floyd County)
- Lake Cumberland Center for the Arts (Pulaski County)

== See also ==
- List of attractions and events in the Louisville metropolitan area
- List of concert halls
- List of theaters in Kentucky
- Performing arts in Louisville, Kentucky
