= Brown Theatre =

The Brown Theatre
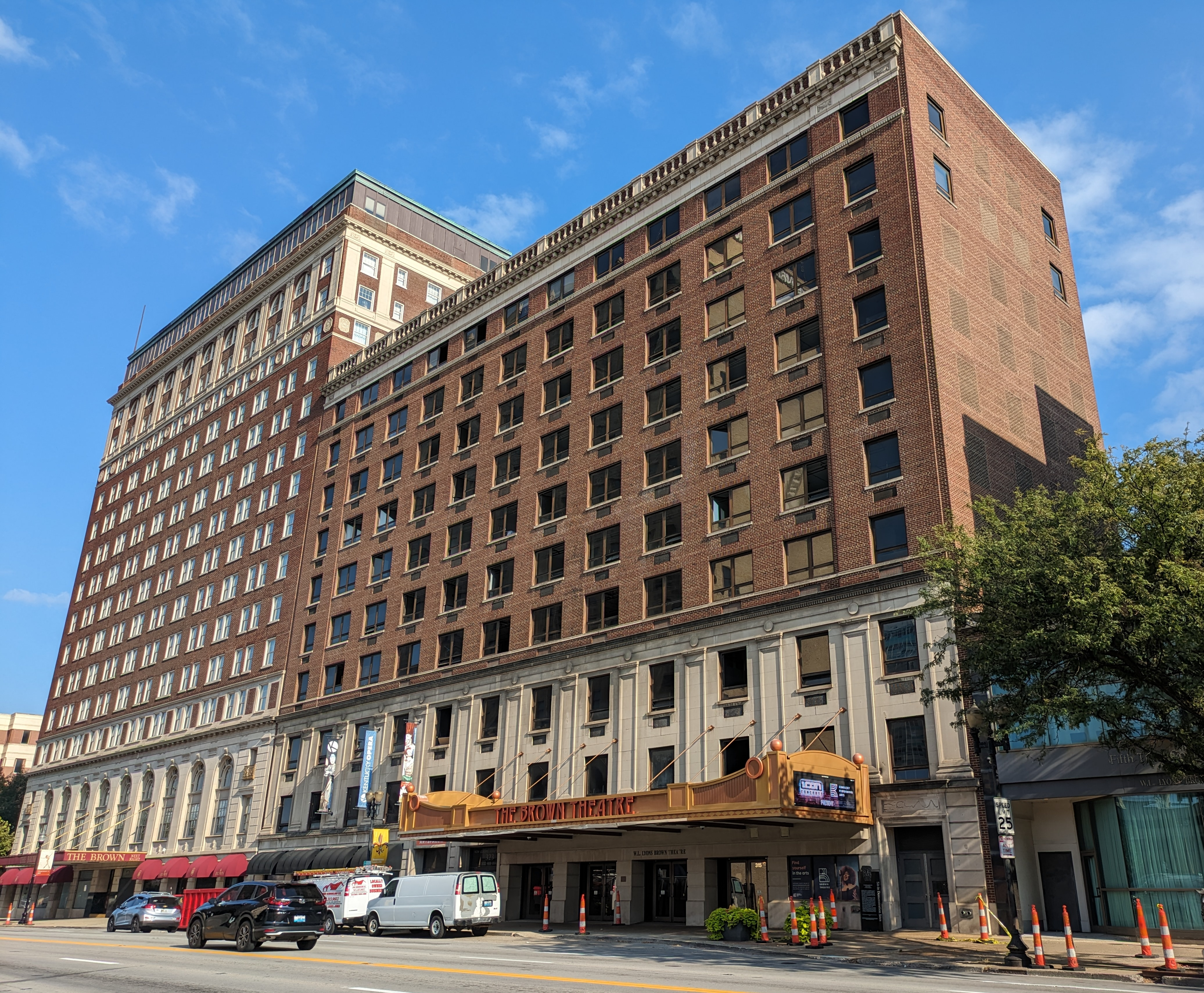
- Interactive map of The Brown Theatre
- Address: 315 W. Broadway; Louisville, Kentucky
- Coordinates: 38.24623°N 85.75739°W
- Owner: Kentucky Performing Arts
- Operator: Kentucky Performing Arts
- Capacity: 1,400

Construction
- Opened: 1925

The W. L. Lyons Brown Theatre, originally called the Brown Theatre, is a restored theatre in Louisville, Kentucky. Dating to 1925, it seats approximately 1,400 patrons and is one of three venues owned by Kentucky Performing Arts.

== History ==
The Theatre opened on October 5, 1925. The space was named for James Graham Brown, an Indiana native and longtime Louisville resident. Modeled after New York's famous Music Box Theatre, the space boasts a 40' x 40' stage.

With the onset of the Great Depression, the Brown was leased to the Fourth Avenue Amusement Company in the 1930s as a movie theater. By 1962 the Brown Theatre was renovated so that it could once again stage live performances.

Another renovation took place in 1971 and afterwards was sold to the Louisville Board of Education, operating under contract to the Louisville Theatrical Association. The theatre was briefly rechristened The Macauley Theatre. In 1982, the Broadway-Brown Partnership was formed and purchased the theatre and adjoining hotel in an effort to rejuvenate the southern end of Louisville's downtown business district.

Louisville's Fund for the Arts acquired the building in 1997, undertaking to finance the remainder of the $4.2 million restoration with Kentucky Performing Arts under contract to manage the theatre. Gifts were also received from the W.L. Lyons Brown Foundation, the Brown family of Louisville, and the Brown-Forman Corporation.

In 1998, re-christened the W.L. Lyons Brown Theatre, new stage equipment and rigging, a modernized computer marquee, and new heating and air conditioning systems are put into place. Further gifts from Owsley Brown Frazier resulted in the main reception area adjoining the Fifth Third Conference Center being named the Frazier Lobby.

== See also ==
- List of attractions and events in the Louisville metropolitan area
- List of concert halls
- Theater in Kentucky
