= Daniil Trifonov discography =

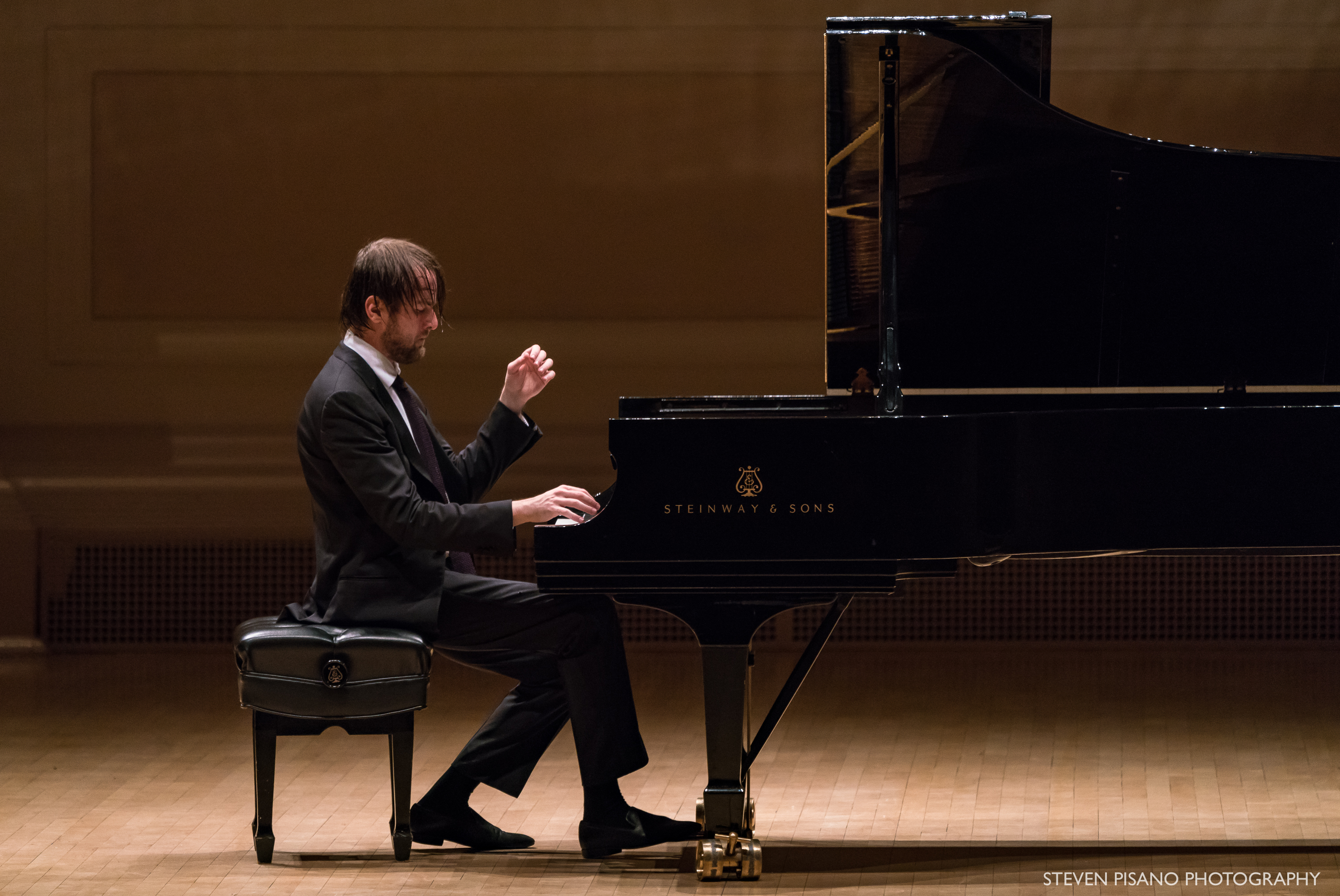
- Daniil Trifonov performing at Carnegie Hall, October 2017
- Studio albums: 9
- Live albums: 3
- Compilation albums: 1
- Contributions: 2
- Video releases: 2

The recording career of Russian pianist and composer Daniil Trifonov initially focused on the music of Frédéric Chopin. His first three albums, recorded in 2010 and released in 2011, exclusively consisted of works of Chopin: the first album, Daniil Trifonov plays Frédéric Chopin, consisting of music performed live in recitals in Italy, was released by Decca Records in April; his second album, Chopin: Mazurki; Konzert, containing performances from the 16th Chopin International Piano Competition in Warsaw (where he won the third prize), was released in May; and finally, his third album, Chopin, a studio recording, was released in July. Trifonov's next album, Tchaikovsky: Piano Concerto No. 1, released in 2012, included a performance of Tchaikovsky's Piano Concerto No. 1 with the Mariinsky Theatre Orchestra conducted by Valery Gergiev.

In February 2013, Trifonov signed an exclusive recording contract with Deutsche Grammophon (DG). His first album for DG, The Carnegie Recital, is a live recording of a recital he had given in Carnegie Hall that month. Other recitals and chamber music concerts were recorded at festivals such as those of Verbier and Lockenhaus, resulting in a few works, including Mieczysław Weinberg's Sonatina in a performance with Gidon Kremer, being issued on other labels courtesy of DG. Trifonov's second album for DG, Rachmaninov Variations, was devoted to music by Sergei Rachmaninoff, and included the Rhapsody on a Theme of Paganini recorded with the Philadelphia Orchestra conducted by Yannick Nézet-Séguin, the Chopin and Corelli solo piano variations, and Rachmaniana, one of his own piano compositions which he wrote during his first year as a student of the Cleveland Institute of Music in 2009–10. This album was issued mid-2015. Soon after, a double DVD with two films directed by Christopher Nupen was released. The first DVD included a documentary which featured Trifonov performing excerpts of his own Piano Concerto in E-flat minor; the other DVD featured a live recital interspersed with interviews.

Trifonov's 2016 album for DG, Transcendental, consisting of the complete piano études of Franz Liszt, was a major success. It reached the number one position in the Specialist Classical Albums Chart in the United Kingdom in October 2016, was designated one of "The Best Classical Music Recordings of 2016" by The New York Times, and won the 2018 Grammy Award for Best Classical Instrumental Solo. In 2016, Trifonov also received Gramophone's Artist of the Year Award. In 2017, Trifonov released three albums with DG: an album consisting of piano trios by Rachmaninoff performed with Gidon Kremer and Giedrė Dirvanauskaitė; Chopin Evocations, an album with music written by or in homage of Chopin; and an album with chamber music by Franz Schubert performed with such artists as Anne-Sophie Mutter. Trifonov then recorded two further albums dedicated to Rachmaninoff, Destination Rachmaninov • Departure and Destination Rachmaninov • Arrival, which were released in 2018 and 2019 respectively; the albums comprise the composer's four piano concertos with Nézet-Séguin and the Philadelphia Orchestra, in addition to J.S. Bach's Partita for violin solo No. 3 in E major (BWV 1006) arranged for piano solo by Rachmaninoff and Trifonov's own transcriptions for piano solo of Vocalise (Op. 34 No. 14) and The Silver Sleigh Bells (first movement of The Bells, Op. 35).

Trifonov has earned considerable commercial and critical success. In addition to earning a Grammy for Transcendental, he earned Grammy nominations for Rachmaninov Variations and The Carnegie Recital. In 2016, Trifonov received the Gramophone Classical Music Awards' Artist of the Year Award. His successes also include appearances on international record chart rankings, including eight albums that have ranked on the Billboard Top Classical Album chart.

== Albums ==
=== Studio albums ===
Title	Album details	Peak chart positions								
Title	Album details	AUS Cl.	BEL (Fl)	BEL (Fl) Cl.	BEL (Wa) Cl.	FRA	NLD	GER	UK Cl.	US Cl.
Chopin	Released: 24 July 2011; Recorded: St. Moniuszko Academy of Music in Gdansk, December 2010; Contributing artists: Polish Chamber Philharmonic Orchestra and Wojciech Rajski (Chopin Piano Concerto No. 1); Label: Dux Records; Format: CD, digital download; Works: Frédéric Chopin: Piano Concerto No. 1 in E minor, Op. 11; Chopin: Barcarolle in F-sharp major, Op. 60; Chopin: Impromptu in A-flat major, Op. 29; Chopin: Impromptu in F-sharp major, Op. 36; Chopin: Tarantella in A-flat major, Op. 43	—	—	—	—	—	—	—	—	—
Tchaikovsky: Piano Concerto No. 1	Released: 27 August 2012; Recorded: Concert Hall of the Mariinsky Theatre in Saint Petersburg; Contributing artists: Mariinsky Theatre Orchestra and Valery Gergiev (Tchaikovsky Piano Concerto No. 1); Label: Mariinsky; Format: Super Audio CD, LP, digital download; Works: Pyotr Ilyich Tchaikovsky: Piano Concerto No. 1 in B-flat minor, Op. 23; Tchaikovsky: Un poco di Chopin, Op. 72 No. 15; Frédéric Chopin: Barcarolle in F-sharp major, Op. 60; Franz Schubert (arr. Franz Liszt): Erlkönig; Schubert/Liszt: Frühlingsglaube; Schubert/Liszt: Die Forelle; Schubert/Liszt: Auf dem Wasser zu singen; Schubert/Liszt: Die Stadt; Robert Schumann (arr. Franz Liszt): Widmung; Modest Mussorgsky: Gopak (LP only)	—	—	—	—	—	—	—	—	—
Rachmaninov Variations	Released: 15 June 2015; Recorded: Verizon Hall at the Kimmel Center for the Performing Arts in Philadelphia, March 2015 (Paganini Rhapsody); American Academy of Arts and Letters in New York City, March 2015 (Chopin Variations, Corelli Variations, Rachmania); Contributing artists: Philadelphia Orchestra and Yannick Nézet-Séguin (Rachmaninoff Rhapsody); Label: Deutsche Grammophon; Format: CD, digital download; Nominated for the Grammy Award for Best Classical Instrumental Solo at the 58th Annual Grammy Awards; Works: Sergei Rachmaninoff: Rhapsody on a Theme of Paganini, Op. 43; Rachmaninoff: Variations on a Theme of Chopin, Op. 22; Rachmaninoff: Variations on a Theme of Corelli, Op. 42; Daniil Trifonov: Rachmaniana	2	—	6	5	—	90	—	—	10
Transcendental: Daniil Trifonov Plays Franz Liszt	Released: 7 October 2016; Recorded: Siemens-Villa in Berlin, September 2015; Label: Deutsche Grammophon; Format: CD, digital download; Winner of the Grammy Award for Best Classical Instrumental Solo at the 60th Annual Grammy Awards; Works: Franz Liszt: Transcendental Études, S 139; Liszt: Two Concert Études, S 145; Liszt: Three Concert Études, S 144; Liszt: Grandes études de Paganini, S 141	3	149	3	4	186	42	94	1	4
Preghiera – Rachmaninov: Piano Trios	Released: 24 February 2017; Recorded: Echternach/Luxembourg, Trifolion, 1–3 May 2015; Contributing artists: Gidon Kremer, violin and Giedrė Dirvanauskaitė, cello; Label: Deutsche Grammophon; Format: CD, digital download; Works: Fritz Kreisler: Preghiera for piano trio (after II. Adagio sostenuto from Sergei Rachmaninoff's Piano Concerto No. 2); Sergei Rachmaninoff: Trio élégiaque No. 1; Sergei Rachmaninoff: Trio élégiaque No. 2	4	—	6	8	—	—	—	—	25
Chopin Evocations	Released: 6 October 2017; Recorded: Bad Kissingen, Regentenbau, Rossini-Saal; Hamburg-Harburg, Friedrich-Ebert-Halle; and Konzerthaus Dortmund, July 2016; Contributing artists: Mahler Chamber Orchestra and Mikhail Pletnev (Chopin piano concertos, "Là ci darem la mano" variations), Sergei Babayan (Chopin rondo); Label: Deutsche Grammophon; Format: CD, digital download; Works: Chopin: Piano Concerto No. 2 in F minor, Op. 21 (orchestrated by Mikhail Pletnev); Chopin: Piano Concerto No. 1 in E minor, Op. 11 (orchestrated by Mikhail Pletnev); Chopin: Variations on "Là ci darem la mano", Op. 2; Chopin: Rondo in C major for two pianos, Op. 73; Chopin: Fantaisie-Impromptu, Op. 66; Robert Schumann: "Chopin" from Carnaval, Op. 9; Edvard Grieg: Study "Hommage à Chopin", Op. 73 No. 5; Samuel Barber: Nocturne, Op. 33; Pyotr Ilyich Tchaikovsky: Un poco di Chopin, Op. 72; Federico Mompou: Variations on a Theme of Chopin	—	—	7	10	198	65	142	—	6
Schubert: Trout Quintet	Released: 3 November 2017; Recorded: Festspielhaus Baden-Baden, June 2017; Contributing artists: Anne-Sophie Mutter, violin (Trout Quintet, Notturno, Ständchen, Ave Maria); Hwayoon Lee, viola (Trout Quintet); Maximilian Hornung, cello (Trout Quintet and Notturno); Roman Patkoló, double bass (Trout Quintet); Label: Deutsche Grammophon; Format: CD, digital download; Works: Franz Schubert: Piano Quintet in A major, D 667 ("Trout"); Schubert: Notturno for piano trio in E-flat major, D 897; Schubert (arr. Mischa Elman for violin and piano): Ständchen from Schwanengesang, D 957/4; Schubert (arr. Jascha Heifetz for violin and piano): Ave Maria, D 839	—	—	15	11	—	—	—	—	17
Destination Rachmaninov • Departure	Released: 12 October 2018; Recorded: Verizon Hall at the Kimmel Center for the Performing Arts in Philadelphia, April 2018 (Piano Concerto No. 2 and Bach-Rachmaninoff Partita) and October 2015 (Piano Concerto No. 4; live); Contributing artists: Philadelphia Orchestra and Yannick Nézet-Séguin (piano concerti); Label: Deutsche Grammophon; Format: CD, LP, digital download; Works: Sergei Rachmaninoff: Piano Concerto No. 2 in C minor, Op. 18; Johann Sebastian Bach: Partita for violin solo No. 3 in E major, BWV 1006 (arr. for piano solo by Rachmaninoff); Rachmaninoff: Piano Concerto No. 4 in G minor, Op. 40	—	—	9	5	—	—	89	—	4
Destination Rachmaninov • Arrival	Released: 11 October 2019; Recorded: Verizon Hall at the Kimmel Center for the Performing Arts in Philadelphia, April 2018 (Piano Concerto No. 3; live) and November 2016 (Piano Concerto No.1); Philharmonie in Berlin, February 2019 (The Silver Sleigh Bells; live); Richardson Auditorium in Alexander Hall at Princeton University, January 2019 (Vocalise); Contributing artists: Philadelphia Orchestra and Yannick Nézet-Séguin (piano concerti); Label: Deutsche Grammophon; Format: CD, LP, digital download; Works: Sergei Rachmaninoff: The Bells, Op. 35; I. The Silver Sleigh Bells (arr. for solo piano by Trifonov); Rachmaninoff: Piano Concerto No. 1 in F♯ minor, Op. 1; Rachmaninoff: Vocalise, Op. 34 No. 14 (arr. for piano solo by Trifonov); Rachmaninoff: Piano Concerto No. 3 in D minor, Op. 30	—	—	—	—	—	—	—	—	—
Silver Age	Released: 5 November 2020; Recorded: Richardson Auditorium at Princeton University, January 2019 (all works except for concerti); Mariinsky Theatre in St. Petersburg, November 2019 (concerti); Contributing artists: Mariinsky Orchestra and Valery Gergiev (concerti); Label: Deutsche Grammophon; Format: CD, LP, digital download; Works: Igor Stravinsky: Serenade in A; Sergei Prokofiev: Sarcasms, Op. 17; Prokofiev: Piano Sonata No. 8 in B-flat major, Op. 84; Stravinsky: The Firebird (arr. Guido Agosti); Prokofiev: Concert for Piano and Orchestra No. 2 in G minor, Op. 16; Stravinsky: Three Movements from Petrushka; Alexander Scriabin: Concerto for Piano and Orchestra in F-sharp minor, Op. 20									
Bach: The Art of Life	Released: 8 October 2021; Recorded: Mechanics Hall, Worcester, December 2020; Label: Deutsche Grammophon; Format: CD, digital download; Works: Johann Sebastian Bach: The Art of Fugue, BWV 1080; Johann Sebastian Bach: Musette in D major, BWV Anh. 126; Johann Sebastian Bach: Gedenke doch, mein Geist, BWV 509; Johann Sebastian Bach: Minuet in G major, BWV Anh. 114; Johann Sebastian Bach: Minuet in G major, BWV Anh. 116; Johann Sebastian Bach: Polonaise in F major, BWV Anh. 117a; Johann Sebastian Bach: Polonaise in D minor, BWV Anh. II / 128; Johann Sebastian Bach: Gib dich zufrieden, BWV 511; Johann Sebastian Bach: Menuett in A minor, BWV Anh. II / 120; Johann Sebastian Bach: Minuet in F major, BWV Anh. 113; Johann Sebastian Bach: Polonaise, BWV Anh. 125; Johann Sebastian Bach: Menuett in C minor, BWV Anh. II / 121; Johann Sebastian Bach: Cantata BWV 147 'Herz und Mund und Tat und Leben'; Wilhelm Friedemann Bach: Twelve Polonaises, F. 12 No. 8 in E minor; Carl Philipp Emanuel Bach: Clavier‐Sonaten und freie Fantasien nebst einigen Rondos, Wq 59 IV. Rondo in C minor, H. 283; Johann Christoph Friedrich Bach: Variations on "Ah vous dirais-je, Maman," HW 12 no 2; Johann Christian Bach: Harpsichord Sonata, Op. 17 No. 5; Johannes Brahms: Chaconne von JS Bach (arr. for piano); Gottfried Heinrich Stölzel: Bist du bei mir	—	—	—	—	—	—	—	—	—
Lieder	Released: 10 June 2022; Recorded: Teldex Studio, Berlin, October 2018; Contributing artists: Matthias Goerne, baritone; Label: Deutsche Grammophon; Format: CD, digital download; Works: Alban Berg: Four Songs, Op. 2; Robert Schumann: Kerner Lieder, Op. 35; Hugo Wolf: Various Lieder; Dmitri Shostakovich: Suite on Verses of Michelangelo Buonarroti, Op. 145; Johannes Brahms: Vier Ernste Gesänge, Op. 121	—	—	—	—	—	—	—	—	—
Rachmaninoff for Two	Released: 29 March 2024; Recorded: Konzerthaus, Vienna, July 2023; Contributing artists: Sergei Babayan, piano; Label: Deutsche Grammophon; Format: CD, digital download; Works: Sergei Rachmaninoff: Adagio from Symphony No. 2 in E minor, Op. 27 (arr. Trifonov for two pianos); Rachmaninoff: Suite No. 1 for two pianos, Op. 5; Rachmaninoff: Suite No. 2 for two pianos, Op. 17; Rachmaninoff: Symphonic Dances, Op. 45 (arr. for two pianos)	—	—	—	—	—	—	—	—	—
My American Story - North	Released: 4 October 2024; Recorded: Various locations, 2023; Contributing artists: Philadelphia Orchestra and Yannick Nézet-Séguin; Label: Decca Records; Format: CD, digital download; Works: Art Tatum: "Cover the Waterfront"; George Gershwin: Concerto in F; Aaron Copland: Piano Variations; Victor Young/Bill Evans: "When I Fall in Love"; John Adams: China Gates; John Corigliano: Fantasia on an Ostinato; Dave Grusin: "Memphis Stomp"; Thomas Newman: American Beauty; Mason Bates: Piano Concerto; John Cage: "4’33" (Field Version)	—	—	—	—	—	—	—	—	—
Tchaikovsky	Released: 3 October 2025	—	—	—	—	—	—	—	—	—
Mi Historia Americana: Sur	Released: 2 October 2026; Label: Deutsche Grammophon	—	—	6	8	—	—	—	—	—

=== Live albums ===
Title	Album details	Peak chart positions		
Title	Album details	AUS Cl.	BEL (Wa) Cl.	US Cl.
Daniil Trifonov plays Frédéric Chopin	Released: 2 April 2011; Recorded: La Fenice, Venice, Italy, May 2010 (Rondo à la Mazur, Waltz in E-flat major, Etude in F major, and Andante spianato et grande polonaise brilliante); Fazioli Concert Hall, Sacile, Italy, November 2010 (Mazurkas, B minor sonata); Label: Decca Classics; Format: CD, digital download; Works: Frédéric Chopin: Rondo à la Mazur in F major, Op. 5; Chopin: Waltz in E-flat major, Op. 18; Chopin: Etude in F major, Op. 10 No. 8; Chopin: Andante spianato et grande polonaise brillante, Op. 22; Chopin: 3 Mazurkas, Op. 56; Chopin: Piano Sonata in B minor, Op. 58	—	—	15
Chopin: Mazurki; Konzert	Released 20 May 2011; Recorded: National Philharmonic in Warsaw (during the XVII International Chopin Piano Competition), October 2010; Contributing artists: Warsaw Philharmonic Orchestra and Antoni Wit (Piano Concerto No. 1); Label: Fryderyk Chopin Institute; Format: CD; Works: Frédéric Chopin: Etude in F major, Op. 10 No. 8; Chopin: Etude in G-sharp minor, Op. 25 No. 6; Chopin: Nocturne in B major, Op. 62 No. 1; Chopin: Scherzo in E major, Op. 54; Chopin: Waltz in E-flat major, Op. 18; Chopin: Barcarolle in F-sharp major, Op. 60; Chopin: Mazurkas, Op. 56; Chopin: Scherzo in C-sharp minor, Op. 39; Chopin: Andante spianato et Grande Polonaise brillante in E flat major, Op. 22; Chopin: Rondo à la Mazur in F major, Op. 5; Chopin: Polonaise-Fantasy in A-flat major, Op. 61; Chopin: Tarantella in A-flat major, Op. 43; Chopin: Sonata in B minor, Op. 58; Chopin: Piano Concerto in E minor, Op. 11	—	—	—
Trifonov: The Carnegie Recital	Released: 30 September 2013; Recorded: Stern Auditorium at Carnegie Hall, 5 February 2013; Label: Deutsche Grammophon; Fomat: CD, digital download; Nominated for the Grammy Award for Best Classical Instrumental Solo at the 57th Annual Grammy Awards; Works: Alexander Scriabin: Piano Sonata No. 2 in G-sharp minor "Sonata-Fantasy", Op. 19; Franz Liszt: Piano Sonata in B minor, S. 178; Frédéric Chopin: 24 Preludes, Op. 28; Nikolai Medtner: Fairy Tale in E-flat major, Op. 26 No. 2	5	10	18

=== Compilations ===
Title	Album details
Trifonov Live	Released: 7 October 2014; Label: Deutsche Grammophon; Format: CD; Works: From Trifonov: The Carnegie Recital: Alexander Scriabin: Piano Sonata No. 2 in G-sharp minor "Sonata-Fantasy", Op. 19; Franz Liszt: Piano Sonata in B minor, S. 178; Frédéric Chopin: 24 Preludes, Op. 28; Nikolai Medtner: Fairy Tale in E-flat major, Op. 26 No. 2; From Daniil Trifonov plays Chopin: Frédéric Chopin: Rondo à la Mazur in F major, Op. 5; Chopin: Waltz in E-flat major, Op. 18; Chopin: Etude in F major, Op. 10 No. 8; Chopin: Andante spianato et grande polonaise brillante, Op. 22; Chopin: 3 Mazurkas, Op. 56; Chopin: Piano Sonata in B minor, Op. 58

=== Recordings ===
This section includes a non-exhaustive list of his recorded performances, including non-commercial releases. This list includes live performances of piano concertos, mainly of Russian composers, with such conductors as Valery Gergiev, which were broadcast by radio stations such as BBC and Radio France as well as by the video streaming platform Medici.tv.

Daniil Trifonov recordings
Date	Work	Composer (Work ID)	Other performers	Venue	Type	Release
2010-05	Rondo à la mazur	Chopin (Op. 5)	—	Venice, La Fenice	Live	B0018271-02
2010-05	Grande valse brillante	Chopin (Op. 18)	—	Venice, La Fenice	Live	B0018271-02
2010-05	Étude in F major	Chopin (Op. 10 No. 8)	—	Venice, La Fenice	Live	B0018271-02
2010-05	Andante spianato & Polonaise	Chopin (Op. 22)	—	Venice, La Fenice	Live	B0018271-02
2010-10-03	Étude in F major	Chopin (Op. 10 No. 8)	—	Warsaw, National Phil.	Live	NIFCCD 606
2010-10-03	Étude in G♯ minor	Chopin (Op. 25 No. 6)	—	Warsaw, National Phil.	Live	NIFCCD 606
2010-10-03	Nocturne in B major	Chopin (Op. 62 No. 1)	—	Warsaw, National Phil.	Live	NIFCCD 606
2010-10-03	Scherzo No. 4 in E major	Chopin (Op. 54)	—	Warsaw, National Phil.	Live	NIFCCD 606
2010-10-09	Grande valse brillante	Chopin (Op. 18)	—	Warsaw, National Phil.	Live	NIFCCD 606
2010-10-09	Barcarolle in F♯ major	Chopin (Op. 60)	—	Warsaw, National Phil.	Live	NIFCCD 606
2010-10-09	Mazurkas Nos. 33–35	Chopin (Op. 56)	—	Warsaw, National Phil.	Live	NIFCCD 606
2010-10-09	Scherzo No. 3 in C♯ minor	Chopin (Op. 39)	—	Warsaw, National Phil.	Live	NIFCCD 606
2010-10-09	Andante spianato & Polonaise	Chopin (Op. 22)	—	Warsaw, National Phil.	Live	NIFCCD 606
2010-10-14	Rondo à la mazur	Chopin (Op. 5)	—	Warsaw, National Phil.	Live	NIFCCD 606
2010-10-14	Polonaise-Fantaisie	Chopin (Op. 61)	—	Warsaw, National Phil.	Live	NIFCCD 607
2010-10-14	Tarantelle in A♭ major	Chopin (Op. 43)	—	Warsaw, National Phil.	Live	NIFCCD 607
2010-10-14	Piano Sonata No. 3 in B minor	Chopin (Op. 58)	—	Warsaw, National Phil.	Live	NIFCCD 607
2010-10-18	Piano Concerto No. 1 in E minor	Chopin (Op. 11)	Wit, Warsaw Phil.	Warsaw, National Phil.	Live	NIFCCD 607
2010-11	Mazurkas Nos. 33–35	Chopin (Op. 56)	—	Sacile, Fazioli Hall	Live	B0018271-02
2010-11	Piano Sonata No. 3 in B minor	Chopin (Op. 58)	—	Sacile, Fazioli Hall	Live	B0018271-02
2010-12	Piano Concerto No. 1 in E minor	Chopin (Op. 11)	Rajski, Sopot Orch.	Gdańsk, Moniuszko Ac.		DUX 0832
2010-12	Barcarolle in F♯ major	Chopin (Op. 60)	—	Gdańsk, Moniuszko Ac.		DUX 0832
2010-12	Impromptu No. 1 in A♭ major	Chopin (Op. 29)	—	Gdańsk, Moniuszko Ac.		DUX 0832
2010-12	Impromptu No. 2 in F♯ major	Chopin (Op. 36)	—	Gdańsk, Moniuszko Ac.		DUX 0832
2010-12	Tarantelle in A♭ major	Chopin (Op. 43)	—	Gdańsk, Moniuszko Ac.		DUX 0832
2011-05-16	Sonata in D minor	Scarlatti (L 108)	—	Tel Aviv, Museum of Art	Video	Ar. Rub. Soc.
2011-05-16	Piano Sonata in D major	Haydn (Hob.XVI:42)	—	Tel Aviv, Museum of Art	Video	Ar. Rub. Soc.
2011-05-16	Piano Sonata No. 3 in A minor	Prokofiev (Op. 28)	—	Tel Aviv, Museum of Art	Video	Ar. Rub. Soc.
2011-05-16	Barcarolle in F♯ major	Chopin (Op. 60)	—	Tel Aviv, Museum of Art	Video	Ar. Rub. Soc.
2011-05-16	Mazurka No. 35	Chopin (Op. 56/3)	—	Tel Aviv, Museum of Art	Video	Ar. Rub. Soc.
2011-05-16	Mephisto Waltz No. 1	Liszt (S 514)	—	Tel Aviv, Museum of Art	Video	Ar. Rub. Soc.
2011-05-19	Five Pieces for piano (extract)	Ben-Haim (Op. 34)	—	Tel Aviv, Museum of Art	Video	Ar. Rub. Soc.
2011-05-19	Piano Sonata No. 3 in F♯ minor	Scriabin (Op. 23)	—	Tel Aviv, Museum of Art	Video	Ar. Rub. Soc.
2011-05-19	Études Op. 25, Nos. 1–12	Chopin (Op. 25)	—	Tel Aviv, Museum of Art	Video	Ar. Rub. Soc.
2011-05-21	Piano Quintet in E♭ major	Schumann (Op. 44)	Ariel String Quartet	Tel Aviv, Museum of Art	Video	Ar. Rub. Soc.
2011-05-23	Piano Concerto No. 23 in A major	Mozart (K 488)	Biron, Isr. Camer.	Tel Aviv, Mann Audit.	Video	Ar. Rub. Soc.
2011-05-26	Piano Concerto No. 1 in E minor	Chopin (Op. 11)	Fisch, Israel Ph.	Tel Aviv, Mann Audit.	Video	Ar. Rub. Soc.
2011–2012	Piano Concerto No. 1 in B♭ minor	Tchaikovsky (Op. 23)	Gergiev, Mariinsky	St Petersburg, Mariinsky		MAR0530
2011–2012	Un poco di Chopin	Tchaikovsky (Op. 72/15)	—	St Petersburg, Mariinsky		MAR0530
2011–2012	Barcarolle in F♯ major	Chopin (Op. 60)	—	St Petersburg, Mariinsky		MAR0530
2011–2012	Erlkönig (arr.)	Schubert/Liszt (S 558/4)	—	St Petersburg, Mariinsky		MAR0530
2011–2012	Frühlingsglaube (arr.)	Schubert/Liszt (S 558/7)	—	St Petersburg, Mariinsky		MAR0530
2011–2012	Die Forelle (arr.)	Schubert/Liszt (S 564)	—	St Petersburg, Mariinsky		MAR0530
2011–2012	Auf dem Wasser zu singen (arr.)	Schubert/Liszt (S 558/2)	—	St Petersburg, Mariinsky		MAR0530
2011–2012	Die Stadt (arr.)	Schubert/Liszt (S 560/1)	—	St Petersburg, Mariinsky		MAR0530
2011–2012	Liebeslied (arr. of "Widmung")	Schumann/Liszt (S 566)	—	St Petersburg, Mariinsky		MAR0530
2012	Fairy Tales in A minor–E♭–B♭ major minor from Skazki	Medtner (Op. 20/1 ao)	—	Boston, WGBH	Live	NPR Music
2012	Études Op. 25, Nos. 1–12	Chopin (Op. 25)	—	Boston, WGBH	Live	NPR Music
2012	Firebird, "Danse infernale" (arr.)	Stravinsky/Agosti	—	Boston, WGBH	Live	NPR Music
2012-03	Études Op. 10	Chopin (Op. 10)	—	Tel Aviv	Video	Ar. Rub. Soc.
2012-03	Die Fledermaus, Overture (arr.)	Strauss, J. II/Trifonov	—	Tel Aviv	Video	Ar. Rub. Soc.
2012-03	Piano Sonata in B♭ (1st mvt.)	Schubert (D 960/1)	—	Tel Aviv	Video	Ar. Rub. Soc.
2012-03	Frühlingsglaube (arr.)	Schubert/Liszt (S 558/7)	—	Tel Aviv	Video	Ar. Rub. Soc.
2012-03	Die Stadt (arr.)	Schubert/Liszt (S 560/1)	—	Tel Aviv	Video	Ar. Rub. Soc.
2012-03	Partita for violin No. 3, Gavotte (arr.)	Bach/Rachmaninoff (p.)	—	Tel Aviv	Video	Ar. Rub. Soc.
2012-03	Grande valse brillante	Chopin (Op. 18)	—	Tel Aviv	Video	Ar. Rub. Soc.
2012-04-15	Piano Concerto No. 1 in D♭ major	Prokofiev (Op. 10)	Gergiev, Mariinsky	Moscow, Conservatory	Video	Medici.tv
2012-07-28	Études Op. 10, Nos. 5, 6 and 11	Chopin (Op. 10)	—	Verbier, church	Video	Medici.tv
2012-07-28	Études Op. 25, Nos. 1, 5–7 and 11	Chopin (Op. 25)	—	Verbier, church	Video	Medici.tv
2012-07-28	Hommage à Rameau	Debussy (Images I/2)	—	Verbier, church	Video	Medici.tv
2012-07-28	Firebird, "Danse infernale" (arr.)	Stravinsky/Agosti	—	Verbier, church	Video	Medici.tv
2012-07-31	Piano Concerto No. 2 in F minor	Chopin (Op. 21)	Suzuki, Verbier	Verbier, Combins	Video	Medici.tv
2012-07-31	Partita for violin No. 3 (arr.)	Bach/Rachmaninoff (p.)	—	Verbier, Combins	Video	Medici.tv
2012-07-31	Grande valse brillante	Chopin (Op. 18)	—	Verbier, Combins	Video	Medici.tv
2013-01-10	Fantasia No. 3 in D minor	Mozart (K 397)	—	Paris, Louvre	Live	Medici.tv
2013-01-10	Piano Sonata in B minor	Liszt (S 178)	—	Paris, Louvre	Live	Medici.tv
2013-01-10	Rachmaniana	Trifonov	—	Paris, Louvre	Live	Medici.tv
2013-01-10	Firebird, "Danse infernale" (arr.)	Stravinsky/Agosti	—	Paris, Louvre	Live	Medici.tv
2013-01-10	Partita for violin No. 3, Gav. (arr.)	Bach/Rachmaninoff (p.)	—	Paris, Louvre	Live	Medici.tv
2013-01-10	Liebeslied (arr. of "Widmung")	Schumann/Liszt (S 566)	—	Paris, Louvre	Live	Medici.tv
2013-02-05	Piano Sonata No. 2 in G♯ minor	Scriabin (Op. 19)	—	New York, Carnegie Hall	Live	DG 479 1728
2013-02-05	Piano Sonata in B minor	Liszt (S 178)	—	New York, Carnegie Hall	Live	DG 479 1728
2013-02-05	Preludes Nos. 1–24	Chopin (Op. 28)	—	New York, Carnegie Hall	Live	DG 479 1728
2013-02-05	Fairy Tale in E♭ major from Skazki	Medtner (Op. 26 No. 2)	—	New York, Carnegie Hall	Live	DG 479 1728
2013-07	Sonatina for violin and piano in D	Weinberg (Op. 46)	Kremer (vl)	Lockenhaus	Live	ECM 2368
2013-07-28	Piano Sonata No. 2 in G♯ minor	Scriabin (Op. 19)	—	Verbier, church	Video	Medici.tv
2013-07-28	Piano Sonata in B minor	Liszt (S 178)	—	Verbier, church	Video	Medici.tv
2013-07-28	Preludes Nos. 1–24	Chopin (Op. 28)	—	Verbier, church	Video	Medici.tv
2013-07-28	Rachmaniana	Trifonov	—	Verbier, church	Video	Medici.tv
2013-07-28	Cinderella, Suite No. 2: Waltz & Galop (arr.)	Prokofiev (Op. 108)/Pletnev	Pletnev (pno)	Verbier, Combins	Video	Id. Aud. 2060658
2013-07-28	Preludes Nos. 12, 17 (arr.)	Chopin (Op. 28/12, /17)/Sitkovetsky	Kavakos (vl)	Verbier, Combins	Video	Id. Aud. 2060658
2013-07-31	Piano Quintet No. 2 in A major	Dvořák (Op. 81)	Capuçon, R. and Frang (vl), Bashmet (va), Capuçon, G. (ce)	Verbier, Combins	Video	Medici.tv
2013-08-13	Piano Concerto No. 2 in B major	Glazunov (Op. 100)	Gergiev, LSO	London, Royal Albert H.	Live	BBC (Proms)
2013-12-01	Piano Concerto No. 1 in C minor	Shostakovich (Op. 35)	Martynov (tr), Gergiev, Mariinsky	Paris, Salle Pleyel	Video	Arthaus 107552 (DVD 3 of 8)
2014	Étude in F major	Chopin (Op. 10 No. 8)	—	Castelfranco Veneto, Teatro Accademico	Video	A 19 CN D (DVD 2 of 2)
2014	Étude in C♯ minor	Scriabin (Op. 42 No. 5)	—	Castelfranco Veneto, Teatro Accademico	Video	A 19 CN D (DVD 2 of 2)
2014	Variations on a Theme of Chopin	Rachmaninoff (Op. 22)	—	Castelfranco Veneto, Teatro Accademico	Video	A 19 CN D (DVD 2 of 2)
2014	Die Fledermaus, Overture (arr.)	Strauss, J. II/Trifonov	—	Castelfranco Veneto, Teatro Accademico	Video	A 19 CN D (DVD 2 of 2)
2014-07-20	Theme & Variations from Pieces	Tchaikovsky (Op. 19/6)	—	Verbier, Combins	Video, Live	Medici.tv, 0825646078042
2014-07-20	Variations on a Theme of Chopin	Rachmaninoff (Op. 22)	—	Verbier, Combins	Video	Medici.tv
2014-07-20	Symphonic Studies	Schumann (Op. 13)	—	Verbier, Combins	Video	Medici.tv
2014-07-20	Preludes Nos. 8, 17	Chopin (Op. 28/8, /17)	—	Verbier, Combins	Video	Medici.tv
2014-07-20	Grande valse brillante	Chopin (Op. 18)	—	Verbier, Combins	Video	Medici.tv
2014-07-20	Piano Sonata	Trifonov	—	Verbier, Combins	Video	Medici.tv
2014-07-24	Piano Concerto No. 3 in D minor	Rachmaninoff (Op. 30)	Temirkanov, Verbier	Verbier, Combins	Video	Medici.tv
2014-07-29	Violin Sonata No. 1 in A minor	Schumann (Op. 105)	Kavakos (vl)	Verbier, church	Video	Medici.tv
2014-07-29	Violin Sonata No. 2 in E minor	Busoni (BV 244)	Kavakos (vl)	Verbier, church	Video	Medici.tv
2014-07-29	Suite Italienne	Stravinsky (1933)	Kavakos (vl)	Verbier, church	Video	Medici.tv
2014-07-29	Violin Sonata in E♭ major	Strauss, R. (Op. 18)	Kavakos (vl)	Verbier, church	Video	Medici.tv
2014-07-29	Liebesleid	Kreisler (1905)	Kavakos (vl)	Verbier, church	Video	Medici.tv
2014-11-11	Piano Concerto No. 2 in C minor	Rachmaninoff (Op. 18)	Noseda, Vienna Ph.	Vienna, Konzerthaus	Video	Allegro
2014-12-10	Fantasia and Fugue in G minor, BWV 542 (arr.)	Bach/Liszt (S 463)	—	New York, Carnegie Hall	Video	Medici.tv
2014-12-10	Piano Sonata No. 32 in C minor	Beethoven (Op. 111)	—	New York, Carnegie Hall	Video	Medici.tv
2014-12-10	Études d'exécution transcendante	Liszt (S 139)	—	New York, Carnegie Hall	Video	Medici.tv
2014-12-10	Forgotten Melodies I, No. 8	Medtner (Op. 38/8)	—	New York, Carnegie Hall	Video	Medici.tv
2015-03	Rhapsody on a Theme of Paganini	Rachmaninoff (Op. 43)	Nézet-Séguin, Philadelphia Orch.	Philadelphia, Kimmel Center	Vid.	DG 479 4970
2015-03	Variations on a Theme of Chopin	Rachmaninoff (Op. 22)	—	New York, Arts & Letters		DG 479 4970
2015-03	Rachmaniana	Trifonov	—	New York, Arts & Letters		DG 479 4970
2015-03	Variations on a Theme of Corelli	Rachmaninoff (Op. 42)	—	New York, Arts & Letters		DG 479 4970
2015-05	Preghiera (arr. of Rach 2/2)	Rachmaninoff/Kreisler	Kremer (vl)	Echternach, Trifolion		DG 479 6979
2015-05	Trio élégiaque No. 2 in D minor	Rachmaninoff (Op. 9)	Kremer (vl), Dirvanauskaitė (ce)	Echternach, Trifolion		DG 479 6979
2015-05	Trio élégiaque No. 1 in G minor	Rachmaninoff (no Op.)	Kremer (vl), Dirvanauskaitė (ce)	Echternach, Trifolion		DG 479 6979
2015-06-19	Piano Concerto No. 3 in D minor	Rachmaninoff (Op. 30)	Chung, R. France	Paris, Philharmonie	Live	Radio France
2015-07-22	Andante and variations	Schumann (Op. 46)	Babayan (pno), Harrell and Maisky (ce), Darbellay (hn)	Verbier, Combins	Video	Medici.tv
2015-07-23	Concerto for three pianos	Mozart (K 242)	Matsuev (pno), Gergiev, Verbier	Verbier, Combins	Video	Medici.tv
2015-07-25	Suite No. 1 for two pianos	Rachmaninoff (Op. 5)	Babayan (pno)	Verbier, Combins	Video	Medici.tv
2015-07-25	Suite No. 2 for two pianos	Rachmaninoff (Op. 17)	Babayan (pno)	Verbier, Combins	Video	Medici.tv
2015-07-25	Études d'exécution transcendante	Liszt (S 139)	—	Verbier, Combins	Vid.	Medici.tv
2015-07-31	Piano Trio in D major, "Ghost"	Beethoven (Op. 70/1)	Gringolts (vl), Mørk (ce)	Verbier, church	Video	Medici.tv
2015-07-31	Notturno for piano trio in E♭ major	Schubert (D 897)	Gringolts (vl), Mørk (ce)	Verbier, church	Video	Medici.tv
2015-07-31	Piano Trio No. 1 in B major	Brahms (Op. 8)	Gringolts (vl), Mørk (ce)	Verbier, church	Video, Live	DG 483 5143 (CD 3 of 4)
2015-09	Études d'exécution transcendante	Liszt (S 139)	—	Berlin, Siemensvilla	Vid.	DG 479 5529
2015-09	Two Concert Études	Liszt (S 145)	—	Berlin, Siemensvilla		DG 479 5529
2015-09	Three Concert Études	Liszt (S 144)	—	Berlin, Siemensvilla		DG 479 5529
2015-09	Grandes études de Paganini	Liszt (S 141)	—	Berlin, Siemensvilla		DG 479 5529
2015-09-08	Piano Concerto No. 1 in D♭ major	Prokofiev (Op. 10)	Gergiev, LSO	London, Royal Albert H.	Live	BBC (Proms)
2015-09-08	Piano Concerto No. 3 in C major	Prokofiev (Op. 26)	Gergiev, LSO	London, Royal Albert H.	Live	BBC (Proms)
2015-10	Piano Concerto No. 4 in G minor	Rachmaninoff (Op. 40)	Nézet-Séguin, Philadelphia Orch.	Philadelphia, Kimmel Center	Live	
2016-01-14	Piano Concerto No. 2 in G minor	Prokofiev (Op. 16)	Conlon, ONF	Paris, Maison d. l. Radio	Live	Radio France
2016-07	Rondo for two pianos in C major	Chopin (Op. Posth. 73)	Babayan (pno)	Bad Kissingen, Rossini-S		DG 479 7518
2016-07-16	Piano Concerto No. 1 in B♭ minor	Tchaikovsky (Op. 23)	Gergiev, Munich P.	Munich, Odeonsplatz	Video	BR-Klassik
2016-07-24	Partita for violin No. 2, Cia. (arr.)	Bach/Brahms (WoO)	—	Verbier, Combins	Video	Medici.tv
2016-07-24	Piano Sonata in G major	Schubert (D 894)	—	Verbier, Combins	Video	Medici.tv
2016-07-24	Variations on a Theme of Paganini	Brahms (Op. 35/Book I)	—	Verbier, Combins	Video	Medici.tv
2016-07-24	Piano Sonata No. 1 in D minor	Rachmaninoff (Op. 28)	—	Verbier, Combins	Video	Medici.tv
2016-07-24	Forgotten Melodies I, No. 8	Medtner (Op. 38/8)	—	Verbier, Combins	Video	Medici.tv
2016-07-24	Prelude and Nocturne for the L. H.	Scriabin (Op. 9)	—	Verbier, Combins	Video	Medici.tv
2016-07-29	Fantasiestücke (cello and piano)	Schumann (Op. 73)	Capuçon, G. (ce)	Verbier, church	Video	Medici.tv
2016-07-29	Cello Sonata in G minor	Rachmaninoff (Op. 19)	Capuçon, G. (ce)	Verbier, church	Video	Medici.tv
2016-07-29	Piano Trio in G minor	Smetana (Op. 15)	Kavakos (vl), Capuçon, G. (ce)	Verbier, church	Video	Medici.tv
2016-09-07	Piano Concerto No. 21 in C major	Mozart (K 467)	Thielemann, Staatsk. Dresden	London, Royal Albert H.	Live	BBC (Proms)
2016-10-06	Three Concert Études/3	Liszt (S 144/3)	—	Berlin, Yellow Lounge	Video	UMG
2016-10-06	Grandes études de Paganini/6	Liszt (S 141/6)	—	Berlin, Yellow Lounge	Video	UMG
2016-10-06	Fairy Tale "La Campanella"	Medtner (Op. 20/2)	—	Berlin, Yellow Lounge	Video	UMG
2016-12-08	Kinderszenen	Schumann (Op. 15)	—	New York, Carnegie Hall	Video	Medici.tv
2016-12-08	Toccata in C major	Schumann (Op. 7)	—	New York, Carnegie Hall	Video	Medici.tv
2016-12-08	Kreisleriana	Schumann (Op. 16)	—	New York, Carnegie Hall	Video	Medici.tv
2016-12-08	Three Movements from Petrushka	Stravinsky (1921)	—	New York, Carnegie Hall	Video	Medici.tv
2016-12-08	Prelude and Fugue in E minor, A major, A minor, D major, D minor	Shostakovich (Op. 87)	—	New York, Carnegie Hall	Video	Medici.tv
2016-12-08	Fairy Tales from Skazki	Medtner (Op. 20/2 ao)	—	New York, Carnegie Hall	Video	Medici.tv
2017-04	Variations on "Là ci darem la mano"	Chopin (Op. 2)	—	Hamburg, F.-Ebert-Halle		DG 479 7518
2017-04	Chopin: Agitato, from Carnaval	Schumann (Op. 9/12)	—	Hamburg, F.-Ebert-Halle		DG 479 7518
2017-04	Study "Hommage à Chopin"	Grieg (Op. 73 No. 5)	—	Hamburg, F.-Ebert-Halle		DG 479 7518
2017-04	Nocturne "Homage to John Field"	Barber (Op. 33)	—	Hamburg, F.-Ebert-Halle		DG 479 7518
2017-04	Un poco di Chopin	Tchaikovsky (Op. 72/15)	—	Hamburg, F.-Ebert-Halle		DG 479 7518
2017-04	Variations on a Theme of Chopin	Mompou (1957)	—	Hamburg, F.-Ebert-Halle		DG 479 7518
2017-04	Fantaisie-Impromptu	Chopin (Op. 66)	—	Hamburg, F.-Ebert-Halle		DG 479 7518
2017-04→05	Piano Concerto No. 2 in f (arr.)	Chopin (Op. 21)/Pletnev	Pletnev, Mahler Or.	Dortmund, Konzerthaus	Vid.	DG 479 7518
2017-04→05	Piano Concerto No. 1 in E minor (arr.)	Chopin (Op. 11)/Pletnev	Pletnev, Mahler Or.	Dortmund, Konzerthaus	Vid.	DG 479 7518
2017-07	Trout Quintet	Schubert (D 667)	Mutter (vl), Lee (va), Hornung (ce), Patkoló (db)	Baden-Baden, Festspielhaus		DG 479 7570
2017-07	Notturno for piano trio in E♭ major	Schubert (D 897)	Mutter (vl), Hornung (ce)	Baden-Baden, Festspielhaus		DG 479 7570
2017-07	Ständchen, No. 4 from Schwanengesang (arr.)	Schubert (D 957/4)/Elman	Mutter (vl)	Baden-Baden, Festspielhaus		DG 479 7570
2017-07	Ave Maria, Op. 52 No. 6 (arr.)	Schubert (D 839) /Wilhelmj/Heifetz	Mutter (vl)	Baden-Baden, Festspielhaus		DG 479 7570
2017-11-13	Fantaisie-Impromptu	Chopin (Op. 66)	—	Washington, Tiny Desk	Video	NPR Music
2017-11-13	Chopin: Agitato, from Carnaval	Schumann (Op. 9/12)	—	Washington, Tiny Desk	Video	NPR Music
2017-11-13	Study "Hommage à Chopin"	Grieg (Op. 73 No. 5)	—	Washington, Tiny Desk	Video	NPR Music
2017-11-13	Variations on "Là ci darem..."/5b	Chopin (Op. 2/Coda)	—	Washington, Tiny Desk	Video	NPR Music
2017-10-17	Fantaisie-Impromptu	Chopin (Op. 66)	—	Berlin, Yellow Lounge	Video	UMG
2017-10-17	Variations on a Theme of Chopin	Mompou (1957)	—	Berlin, Yellow Lounge	Video	UMG
2018-04	Piano Concerto No. 2 in C minor	Rachmaninoff (Op. 18)	Nézet-Séguin, Philadelphia Orch.	Philadelphia, Kimmel Center	Live	
2018-04	Piano Concerto No. 3 in D minor	Rachmaninoff (Op. 30)	Nézet-Séguin, Philadelphia Orch.	Philadelphia, Kimmel Center	Live	
2018-06-14	Piano Concerto No. 1 in B♭ minor	Tchaikovsky (Op. 23/1)	Bashmet, Youth Or.	Moscow, River	Video	FIFA

=== Contributions ===
Title	Album details
Mieczyslaw Weinberg	Released: 28 January 2014; Recorded: Neuhardenberg and Lockenhaus, November 2012 and July 2013; Label: ECM Records; Format: CD; Works: Trifonov performs the Mieczysław Weinberg Violin Sonatina, Op. 46 with Gidon Kremer
Verbier Festival: 25 Years of Excellence	Released: 6 July 2018; Label: Deutsche Grammophon; Format: CD; Works: Trifonov performs the Brahms Piano Trio No. 1 in B major, Op. 8 with Ilya Gringolts and Truls Mørk, recorded at Verbier Church in Verbier at the Verbier Festival, 31 July 2015

== Video releases ==
Title	Details	Notes
The Magics of Music / The Castelfranco Veneto Recital	A DVD with two films: The Magics of Music, a portrait film where Trifonov performs Chopin, Ravel, and his own Piano Concerto in E-flat minor; The Castelfranco Veneto Recital, performed live at the Teatro Accademico in Castelfranco Veneto with music by Chopin, Scriabin, Strauss (arr. Trifonov) and Rachmaninoff	Released 25 September 2015; Directed by Christopher Nupen; Produced by Allegro Films
Shostakovich: Complete Symphonies & Concertos	Shostakovich's Piano Concerto No. 1 with Trifonov as soloist included in this box	Released 28 April 2015; Produced by Arthaus Musik
