= Trio élégiaque =

Sergei Rachmaninoff composed two piano trios titled Trio élégiaque:

- Trio élégiaque No. 1 for piano, violin and cello
- Trio élégiaque No. 2 for piano, violin and cello
