= Alexis Weissenberg =

Bulgarian-born French pianist

- Алексис Вайсенберг
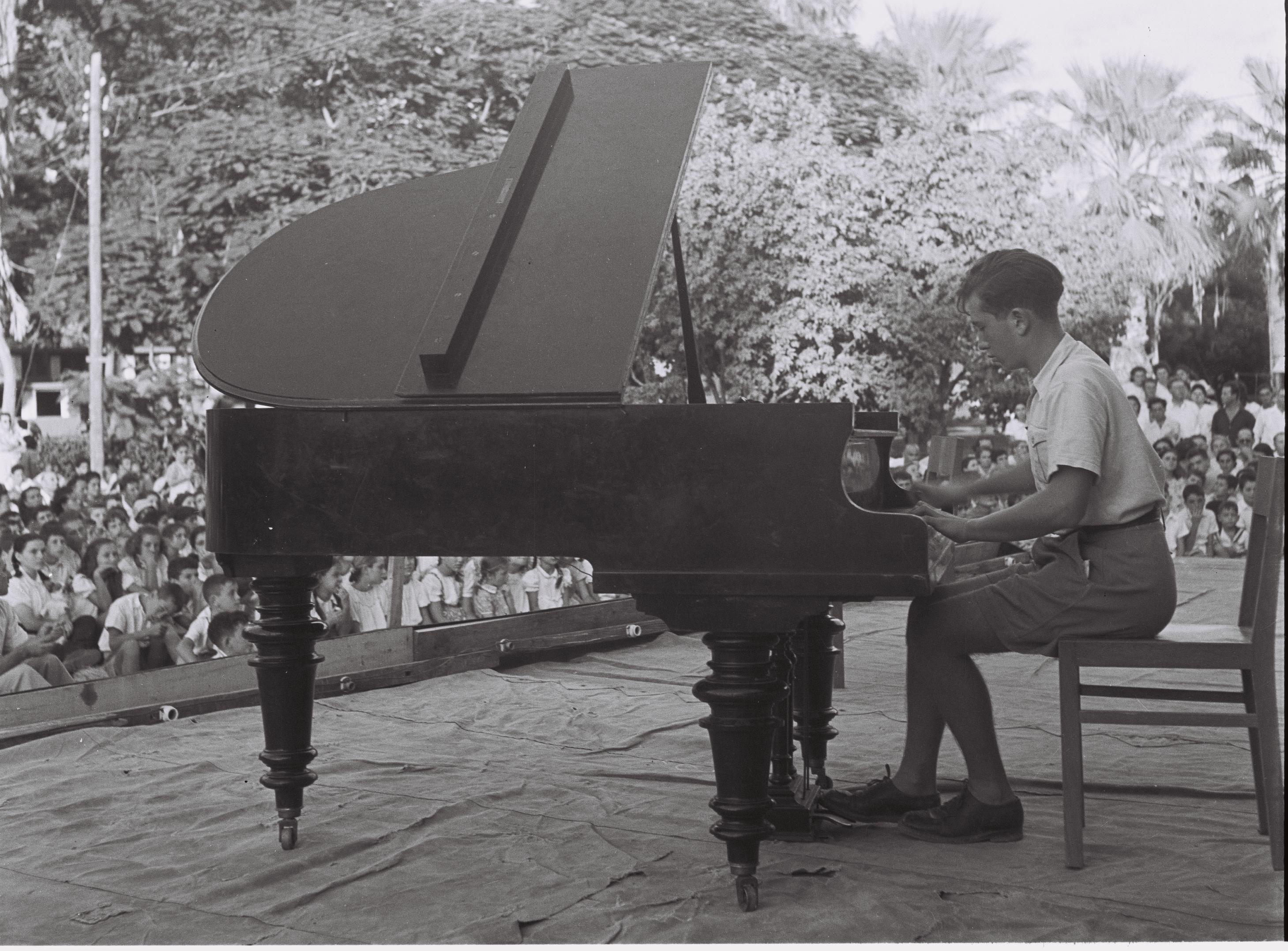
- Alexis Weissenberg, 1947
- Born: 26 July 1929; Sofia, Bulgaria
- Died: 8 January 2012 (aged 82); Lugano, Switzerland
- Occupation: pianist

Alexis Sigismund Weissenberg (Bulgarian: Алексис Сигизмунд Вайсенберг; 26 July 1929 – 8 January 2012) was a Bulgarian-born French pianist.

== Early life and career ==
Born in 1929 to an Ashkenazi Jewish family in Sofia in the Tsardom of Bulgaria, Weissenberg took piano lessons at three from Pancho Vladigerov, a Bulgarian composer. He gave his first public performance at the age of eight.

In 1941, he and his mother tried to escape from German-occupied Bulgaria for Turkey but were caught and imprisoned in a makeshift concentration camp in Bulgaria for three months. A German guard – who had enjoyed hearing Alexis play Schubert on the accordion – hurriedly took him and his mother to the train station, throwing the accordion to him through the window and told them, "Good luck". They arrived safely in Istanbul a day later.

In 1945, they emigrated to Palestine, where Weissenberg studied under Leo Kestenberg and performed Beethoven with the Palestine Symphony Orchestra under the direction of Leonard Bernstein. In 1946, Weissenberg went to the Juilliard School to study with Olga Samaroff. He also studied with Artur Schnabel and Wanda Landowska.

In 1947, Weissenberg made his New York City debut with the New York Philharmonic Orchestra and George Szell in Rachmaninoff's Piano Concerto No. 3 and with Philadelphia Orchestra and Eugene Ormandy, with which Weissenberg won the Leventritt Competition. Between 1957 and 1965, he took an extended sabbatical to study and teach. Weissenberg resumed his career in 1966 with a recital in Paris. Later that year he played Tchaikovsky's Piano Concerto No. 1 in Berlin conducted by Herbert von Karajan, who praised him as "one of the best pianists of our time".

Weissenberg gave piano master classes all over the world. He had many notable students at his Piano Master Class in Engelberg (Switzerland), including Kirill Gerstein, Simon Mulligan, Ivan Moravec, Mehmet Okonsar, Nazzareno Carusi, Andrey Ponochevny, Loris Karpell, Roberto Carnevale and François Weigel among them. He composed piano music and a musical, Nostalgie, premiered at the State Theatre of Darmstadt on 17 October 1992.

Weissenberg died on 8 January 2012 at the age of 82 in Lugano, Switzerland, after suffering from Parkinson's disease. He was survived by three children, David, Cristina and Maria.

== Recorded works ==
He recorded extensively, including works of Schumann, Rachmaninoff, Liszt and Chopin.

Among his other notable interpretations were those of Johannes Brahms's Piano Concerto No. 1, with Carlo Maria Giulini and Riccardo Muti, ("Les Introuvables d'Alexis Weissenberg", 2004), Rachmaninoff's Piano Concerto No. 2 with Herbert von Karajan and the Berlin Philharmonic, as well as his Piano Concerto No. 3 with Georges Prêtre and the Chicago Symphony Orchestra, and Seiji Ozawa with the Boston Symphony Orchestra (also with Leonard Bernstein and the Orchestre National de France).

His 1965 film recording of Stravinsky's Three Movements from Petrushka (directed by Åke Falck) was also highly praised. When Karajan watched the movie, he immediately invited Weissenberg to participate in a filmed performance of the Tchaikovsky First Concerto, replacing Sviatoslav Richter.

== Selected discography ==
=== Audio ===
- Bach: Goldberg Variations
- Bach: Jesu bleibet meine Freude (Choral – aus: Herz und Mund und Tat und Leben BWV 147), Orfeo (CD)
- Bartók: Piano Concerto No. 2 with Eugene Ormandy and the Philadelphia Orchestra RCA Red Seal
- Beethoven: The Five Piano Concertos with Herbert von Karajan and the Berlin Philharmonic Orchestra EMI (3 CDs)
- Beethoven: Piano Sonatas: "Pathétique, Moonlight and Appassionata"
- Brahms: Piano Concerto No. 1 (two recordings, with Carlo Maria Giulini and Riccardo Muti, EMI
- Brahms: Rhapsodie g-Moll op. 79 Nr. 2, Orfeo (CD)
- Brahms: Étude F-Dur, Orfeo (CD)
- Brahms: Sonatas for violin & piano Nos. 1–3, with Anne-Sophie Mutter. EMI (CD)
- Chopin: Piano Sonata No. 3, Scherzos Nos. 1 & 2 RCA Red Seal (LP)
- Chopin: Works for piano and orchestra. EMI (2 CDs)
- Chopin: The Nocturnes. EMI
- Chopin: Piano Sonata Nos. 2 and 3 EMI
- Debussy: Estampes, Suite Bergamasque, Children's Corner, L'Isle Joyeuse, etc. on Deutsche Grammophon
- Debussy: Piano works. Deutsche Grammophon (CD)
- Franck: Symphonic Variations for piano and orchestra (with Herbert von Karajan and The Berlin Philharmonic)
- Haydn: Sonatas Hob.XVI/20,37 & 52, RCA Red Seal (LP)
- Liszt: Piano sonata in B minor. Einsatz Records, Japan
- Liszt: Valse impromptu A-Dur, Orfeo (CD)
- Mozart: Piano Concertos Nos. 9 and 21 with Giulini and the Vienna Symphony Orchestra
- Mussorgsky: Pictures at an Exhibition, Orfeo (CD)
- Mussorgsky: Pictures at an Exhibition, EMI
- Prokofiev: Piano concerto No.3 – Seiji Ozawa, Orchestre de Paris
- Rachmaninoff: Complete Preludes. RCA Red Seal
- Rachmaninoff: Piano Sonatas Nos. 1, 2. Deutsche Grammophon (CD)
- Rachmaninoff: Piano Concerto No. 2 (with Herbert von Karajan and the Berlin Philharmonic Orchestra, 1972)
- Rachmaninoff: Piano Concerto No. 3 (three different recordings, with Georges Pretre, Seiji Ozawa and Leonard Bernstein)
- Ravel: Piano concerto in G – Seiji Ozawa, Orchestre de Paris
- Ravel: Le Tombeau de Couperin, Orfeo (CD)
- Scarlatti: Sonatas (A selection of 15) on Deutsche Grammophon
- Schumann: Fantasie, op. 17. Orfeo (CD)
- Schumann: "Carnaval" op.9, "Kinderszenen", Op. 15 (Toshiba-EMI)

=== Video ===
- Alexis Weissenberg DVD: Classic Archive 2008 – Bach, Brahms, Chopin, Prokofiev, Stravinsky.
- Alexander Scriabin, Nocturne for the Left Hand, Opus 9, No. 2, Alexis Weissenberg on YouTube

=== Books ===
- Gustl Breuer/Henno Lohmeyer (Hrsg.): »Alexis Weissenberg. Ein kaleidoskopisches Porträt«. Rembrandt Verlag, Berlin 1977.
- Lettre d'Alexis Weissenberg à Bernard Gavoty, 1966
- Weissenberg – Drei Interviews – 2012, Sofia
