= Piano Sonata No. 1 (Rachmaninoff) =

Composition for piano by Sergei Rachmaninoff

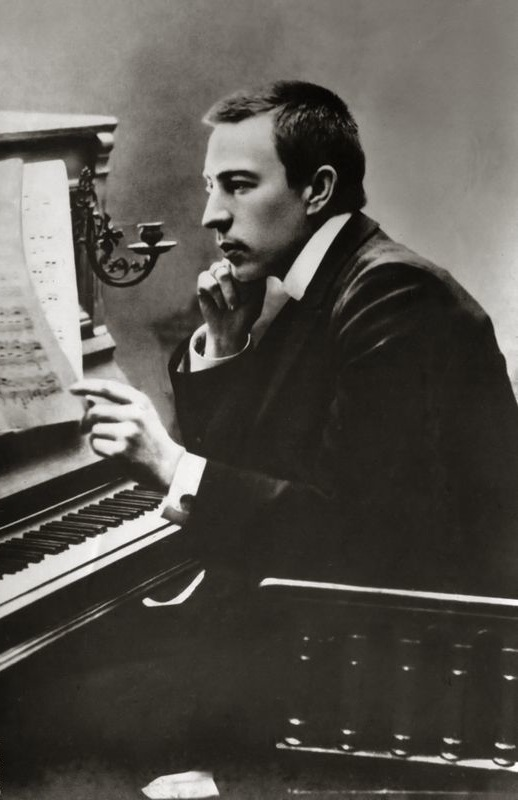
Rachmaninoff in the early 1900s

Piano Sonata No. 1 in D minor, Op. 28, is a piano sonata by Sergei Rachmaninoff, completed in 1908. It is the first of three "Dresden pieces", along with the Symphony No. 2 and part of an opera, which were composed in the quiet city of Dresden, Germany. It was originally inspired by Goethe's tragic play Faust; although Rachmaninoff abandoned the idea soon after beginning composition, traces of this influence can still be found. After numerous revisions and substantial cuts made at the advice of his colleagues, he completed it on April 11, 1908. Konstantin Igumnov gave the premiere in Moscow on October 17, 1908. It received a lukewarm response there, and remains one of the least performed of Rachmaninoff's works.

It has three movements, and takes about 35 minutes to perform. The sonata is structured like a typical Classical sonata, with fast movements surrounding a slower, more tender second movement. The movements feature sprawling themes and ambitious climaxes within their own structure, all the while building towards a prodigious culmination. Although this first sonata is a substantial and comprehensive work, its successor, Piano Sonata No. 2 (Op. 36), written five years later, became the better regarded of the two. Nonetheless, it, too, was given serious cuts and opinions are mixed about those.

== Background ==
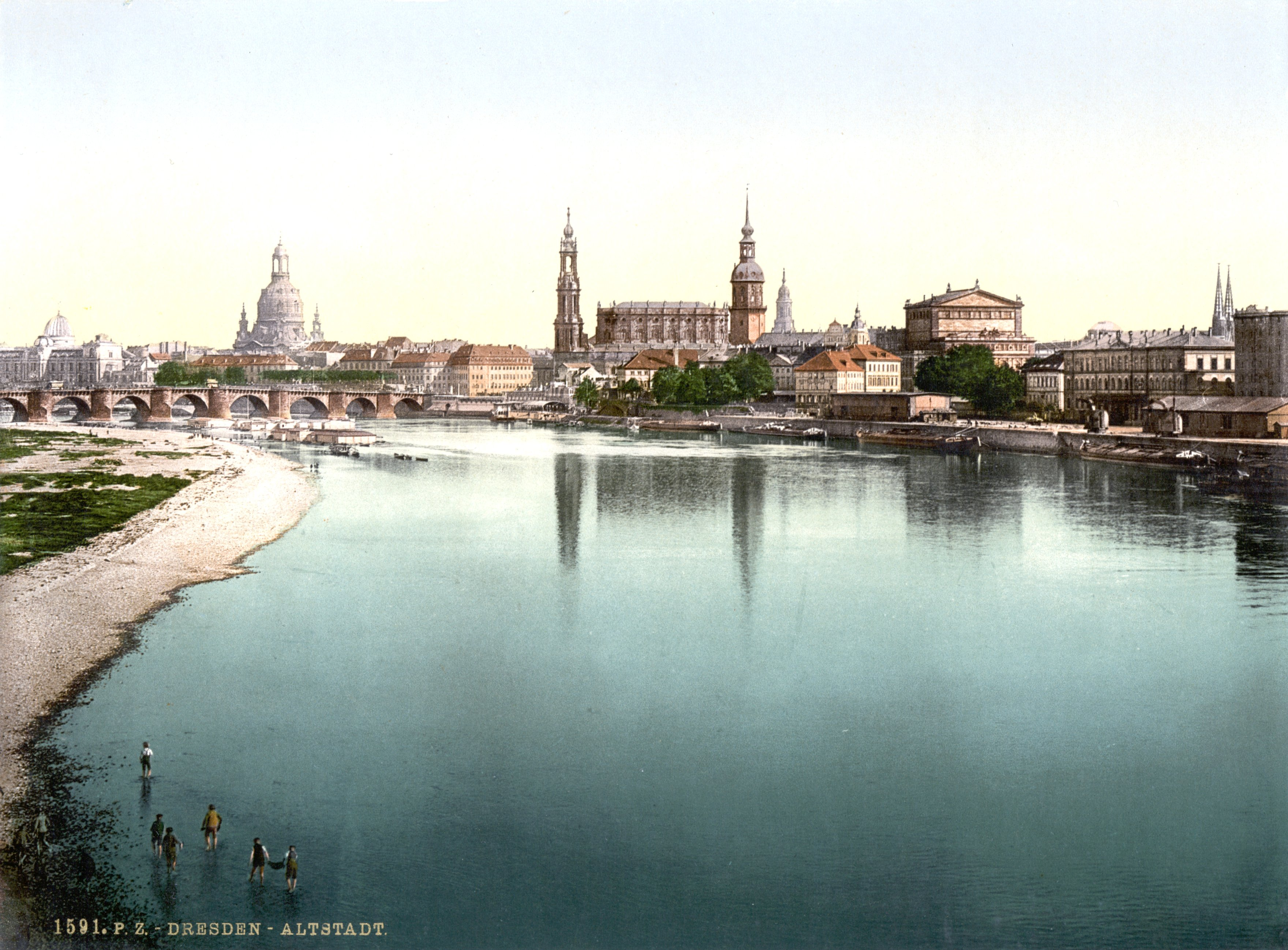
Dresden sits on the Elbe river, providing a quiet environment for Rachmaninoff (1900)

In November 1906, Rachmaninoff, with his wife and daughter, moved to Dresden primarily to compose a second symphony to diffuse the critical failure of his first symphony, but also to escape the distractions of Moscow. There they lived a quiet life, as he wrote in a letter, "We live here like hermits: we see nobody, we know nobody, and we go nowhere. I work a great deal," but even without distraction he had considerable difficulty in composing his first piano sonata, especially concerning its form. The original idea for it was to be a program sonata based on the main characters of the tragic play Faust by Johann Wolfgang von Goethe: Faust, Gretchen, and Mephistopheles, and indeed it nearly parallels Franz Liszt's own Faust Symphony which is made of three movements which reflect those characters. However, the idea was abandoned shortly after composition began, although the theme is still clear in the final version.

Rachmaninoff enlisted the help of Nikita Morozov, one of his classmates from Anton Arensky's class back in the Moscow Conservatory, to discuss how the sonata rondo form applied to his sprawling work. At this time he was invited, along with Alexander Glazunov, Nikolai Rimsky-Korsakov, Alexander Scriabin, and Feodor Chaliapin, to a concert in Paris the following spring held by Sergei Diaghilev to soothe France–Russia relations, although Diaghilev hated his music. Begrudgingly, Rachmaninoff decided to attend only for the money, since he would have preferred to spend time on this and his Symphony No. 2 (his opera project, Monna Vanna, had been dropped). Writing to Morozov before he left in May 1907, he expressed his doubt in the musicality of the sonata and deprecated its length, even though at this time he had completed only the second movement.

On returning to his Ivanovka estate from the Paris concert, he stopped in Moscow to perform an early version of the sonata to contemporaries Nikolai Medtner, Georgy Catoire, Konstantin Igumnov, and Lev Conus. With their input, he shortened the original 45-minute-long piece to around 35 minutes. He completed the work on April 11, 1908. Igumnov gave the premiere of the sonata on October 17, 1908, in Moscow, and he gave the first performance of the work in Berlin and Leipzig as well, although Rachmaninoff missed all three of these performances.

== Composition ==
The piece is structured as a typical sonata in the Classical period:

1. Allegro moderato (in D minor, ends in D major)
2. Lento (in F major)
3. Allegro molto (in D minor)

=== I. Allegro moderato ===
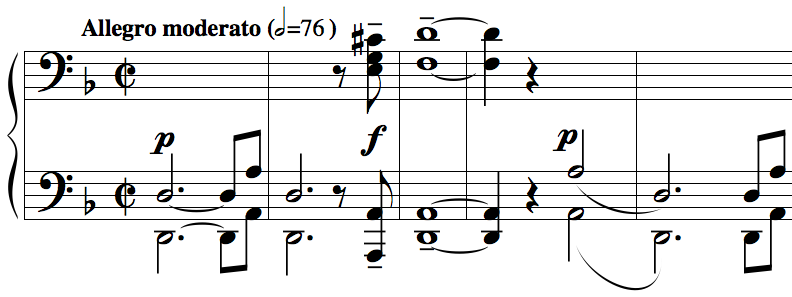
The opening of the sonata's 1st movement.

The substantial first movement Allegro moderato presents most of the thematic material and motifs revisited in the later movements. Juxtaposed in the intro is a motif revisited throughout the movement: a quiet, questioning fifth answered by a defiant authentic cadence, followed by a solemn chord progression. This densely thematic expression is taken to represent the turmoil of Faust's mind. The movement closes quietly in D major.

=== II. Lento ===
In key, the movement pretends to start in D major before settling in the home key of F major. Although the shortest in length and performance time, the second movement Lento provides technical difficulty in following long melodic lines, navigating multiple overlapping voices, and coherently performing the detailed climax, which includes a small cadenza.

=== III. Allegro molto ===
Ending the sonata is the furious third movement Allegro molto. Lacking significant thematic content, the movement serves rather to exploit the piano's character, not without expense of sonority. This movement features quotations of the Dies irae plainchant, particularly in the recapitulation's climax. The very first measures of the first movement are revisited, and then dissolves into the enormous ending climax, a tour de force replete with full-bodied chords typical of Rachmaninoff, which decisively ends the piece in D minor.

== Reception ==
Rachmaninoff played early versions of the piece to Oskar von Riesemann (who later became his biographer), who did not like it. Konstantin Igumnov expressed interest upon first hearing it in Moscow, and following his suggestion Rachmaninoff cut about 110 bars.

The sonata had a mediocre evaluation after Igumnov's premiere in Moscow. Nikolai Rimsky-Korsakov had died several months previously, and the burden of heading Russian classical music had fallen on this all-Rachmaninoff programme of October 17, 1908. Although the concert, which also included Rachmaninoff's Variations on a Theme of Chopin (Op. 22, 1903), was "filled to overflowing", one critic called the sonata dry and repetitive, however redeeming the interesting details and innovative structures were.

Lee-Ann Nelson, via her 2006 dissertation, noted that Rachmaninoff's revisions are always cuts, with the material simply excised and discarded. The hypothesis is that the frequency of negative responses to many of his pieces, not just the response to the first symphony, led to a deep insecurity, particularly with regard to length. The musicologists Efstratiou and Martyn argued against, for instance, the cuts made to the second sonata on a formal basis. The manuscript of the original, unabridged version is held by the Russian National Museum of Music in Moscow.

Today the sonata remains less well-known than Rachmaninoff's second sonata, and is not as frequently performed or recorded. Champions of the work tend to be pianists renowned for their large repertoire. A selection of commercial recordings is given below.

== Selected recordings ==
The sonata has been recorded less often than Rachmaninoff's Second Piano Sonata. The following table is a selection of commercial recordings documented in reliable sources, arranged by year of first release. Recording dates are given in the notes when the source supplies them.

Selected recordings of Piano Sonata No. 1
Pianist	Year	Label	Notes
John Ogdon	1968	RCA Red Seal	Coupled with Sonata No. 2 (LSC-3024).
Ruth Laredo	1980	CBS Masterworks	Vol. 7 of her complete Rachmaninoff solo-piano series (M 35881), with Sonata No. 2.
Howard Shelley	1988	Hyperion	Recorded January 1982 (CDA66047), with Sonata No. 2.
Alexis Weissenberg	1989	Deutsche Grammophon	With Sonata No. 2 (427 499-2).
Boris Berezovsky	1993	Teldec	Recorded 1–5 March 1993, Teldec Studio, Berlin; coupled with the Chopin Variations.
Sergio Fiorentino	1995	Piano Classics	Recorded 14–15 October 1995, Siemensvilla, Berlin (later collected on PCLD0065).
İdil Biret	1998	Naxos	Recorded 1994–95, released June 1998 (8.553003), with Sonata No. 2.
Olli Mustonen	2006	Ondine	Coupled with Tchaikovsky's The Seasons (ODE 1082-5).
Santiago Rodriguez	2010	Élan Recordings	Vol. 1 of his complete Rachmaninoff piano works (82244).
Leslie Howard	2011	Melba Recordings	Recorded 21–23 September 2009, released 9 August 2011 (MR 301127), with Sonata No. 2.
Vladimir Ashkenazy	2011	Decca	Coupled with the Chopin Variations (478 2938).
Zlata Chochieva	2012	Piano Classics	Recorded January 2012, released October 2012 (PCL0047), with the Chopin Variations.
Nikolai Lugansky	2012	Naïve/Ambroisie	Recorded May 2012, released 24 September 2012 (AM208), with Sonata No. 2. Gramophone Editor's Choice, December 2012.
Xiayin Wang	2014	Chandos	Recorded 18–19 January 2014, released May 2014 (CHAN 10816), with Sonata No. 2 and preludes.
Alexander Romanovsky	2015	Universal Classics	Released 14 January 2015 in Japan (UCCD-1414), with Sonata No. 2.
Alexandre Kantorow	2017	BIS	Album À la russe, released April 2017 (BIS-2150).
Rustem Hayroudinoff	2017	Onyx	Released June 2017 (ONYX4181), with Sonata No. 2.
Valentina Lisitsa	2021	Naïve	Album 1908, released 21 December 2021 (V7583), coupled with Ravel's Gaspard de la nuit.
Steven Osborne	2022	Hyperion	Recorded December 2020, released May 2022 (CDA68365), with the Moments musicaux.
Lukas Geniušas	2023	Alpha Classics	First recording of the uncut 1907 manuscript, made on Rachmaninoff's Steinway at Villa Senar (Alpha 997).
Boris Giltburg	2025	Naxos	Recorded August 2023, released 14 February 2025 (8.574601), with Sonata No. 2 and Giltburg's piano arrangement of The Isle of the Dead.

== Sources ==
- Martyn, Barrie (1990). Rachmaninoff: Composer, Pianist, Conductor. London: Scolar press. ISBN 978-0-859-67809-4.
