= Ständchen =

Ständchen is the German word for a serenade, in the form of a song addressed to a beloved. Songs with that title include:

- "Ständchen" WAB 84, a song by Anton Bruckner
- "Vergebliches Ständchen" ("Futile Serenade"), Op.84 No.4, a song by Johannes Brahms; see List of compositions by Johannes Brahms by opus number
- "Ständchen", several songs by Franz Schubert
- "Ständchen", a song by Richard Strauss

== See also ==
- de:Ständchen, in German Wikipedia
