= Medici.tv =

French video streaming platform

medici.tv
- Industry: Video streaming
- Founded: May 2008
- Founders: Hervé Boissière, Pâris Mouratoglou
- Headquarters: Paris, France
- Products: Classical music video streaming subscription
- Website: www.medici.tv

Medici.tv (stylized as medici.tv), created in 2008, is a video streaming platform for classical music, ballet, and jazz.

== History ==
=== Portal founding ===
The Medici.tv portal was co-founded in 2008 by Hervé Boissière and pianist and businessperson Pâris Mouratoglou. After filming and broadcasting the Verbier Festival in 2007, the medici.tv video platform was officially launched on 1 May 2008 with 200 shows.

This launch was followed by several live events; a concert of the New York Philharmonic, the classical music festival in Aspen, the Opera Festival in Aix-en-Provence, and the 2008 Verbier Festival.

In 2013, the Medici.tv website recorded 1.5 million unique visitors. The same year, during the Verbier Festival concert's live-stream, the platform stated it reached 750,000 connections from 177 countries. At the end of 2014, Medici.tv started broadcasting from Carnegie Hall, marking the first time that Carnegie Hall concerts were filmed and broadcast on the internet, live and on replay. From June 15 to July 3, 2015, medici.tv broadcast the XV International Tchaikovsky Competition. In 2017, Medici.tv broadcast live Martha Argerich at Carnegie Hall. For the 25th anniversary of the Verbier Festival in July 2018, Medici.tv organized an 8-hour live-stream.

=== LVMH partial ownership ===
In 2020, LVMH acquired a 50% stake in the company. In February 2020, LVMH's media subsidiary Les Echos-Le Parisien group acquired 50% of Medici.com's capital. Hervé Boissière was placed at the head of both Mezzo and Medici.com. The other half of Medici.tv remained held by its founders, including Pâris Mouratoglou and Hervé Boissière. In May 2021, medici.tv added around 300 jazz programmes to the platform's video-on-demand catalogue.

== Platform ==
By early 2020, the platform claimed 20,000 subscribers with the US and Canada as its dominant markets.

In 2020, Medici.tv listed a catalog of 2,500 programs, and offered around 150 live events annually. It listed partnerships with festivals and venues such as Carnegie Hall, Wiener Philharmoniker, Mariinsky Theatre, Philharmonie de Paris, Verbier Festival, Salzburg Festival, NCPA in Beijing, Tchaikovsky Competition, and Juilliard School.

The platform can be streamed on computer, tablet, phone, and TV via Apple TV and Chromecast, and is available in English, French, Spanish and Russian.

=== Streamed live events ===
With around 150 live events streamed in 2021, medici.tv lhosts performances by artists, ensembles and orchestras from concert halls, festivals and competitions. Live streams have included groups and venues such as the Opéra national de Paris, Berliner Philharmoniker, London Symphony Orchestra, The Cleveland Orchestra, Mariinsky Theatre Symphony Orchestra, New York Philharmonic, Royal Concertgebouw Orchestra, Carnegie Hall, Bolshoi Theater, Glyndebourne Festival, Verbier Festival, Salzburg Festival, the International Tchaikovsky Competition, and the International Chopin Piano Competition among others.

=== Video catalog ===
medici.tv has a video on demand (VOD) catalog with around 3,000 videos of concerts, operas, ballets, jazz programs, classic archives, documentaries and master classes.

Musicians and artists featured on medici.tv include Martha Argerich, Daniel Barenboim, Khatia_Buniatishvili, Natalie_Dessay, Joyce DiDonato, Gustavo Dudamel, Renée Fleming, Valery Gergiev, Janine Jansen, Jonas Kaufmann, Evgeny Kissin, Lang Lang, Elisabeth Leonskaja, Riccardo Muti, Kent Nagano, Anna Netrebko, Yannick Nézet-Séguin, Gianandrea Noseda, Sir Simon Rattle, Anoushka Shankar, Yuri Temirkanov, Rolando Villazón, and Yuja Wang, as well as Claudio Abbado, Leonard Bernstein, Maria Callas, Glenn Gould, Nikolaus Harnoncourt, Herbert von Karajan, and Yehudi Menuhin.

In 2022, among jazz performers were Louis Armstrong, Chet Baker, BB King, James Brown, Ray Charles, John Coltrane, Chick Corea, Miles Davis, Duke Ellington, Bill Evans, Ella Fitzgerald, Dizzy Gillespie, Lionel Hampton, Herbie Hancock, Coleman Hawkins, Milt Jackson, Ahmad Jamal, Keith Jarrett, Quincy Jones, Wynton Marsalis, Thelonious Monk, Archie Shepp, Wayne Shorter, Nina Simone, Sarah Vaughan, Tony Allen, Ambrose Akinmusire, Kenny Barron, Avishai Cohen, Paquito_d'Rivera, Manu Dibango, Bill Frisell, Yaron Herman, Brad Mehldau, Marcus Miller, China Moses, Youssou Ndour, Michel Portal, Chris Potter, and Thomas Quasthoff.
