= Piano Sonata No. 2 (Rachmaninoff) =

Composition for piano by Sergei Rachmaninoff

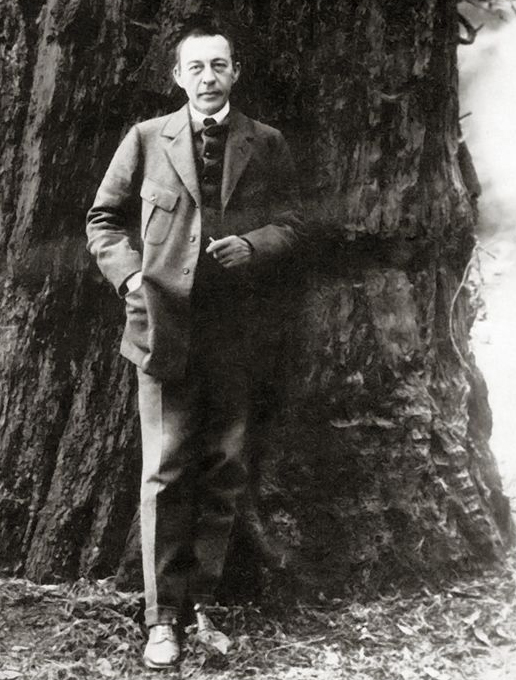
Sergei Rachmaninoff in 1919

Piano Sonata No. 2, Op. 36, is a piano sonata in B♭ minor composed by Sergei Rachmaninoff in 1913, who revised it in 1931, with the note, "The new version, revised and reduced by author."

Its original premiere took place in Kursk on 18 October 1913 (5 October in the Julian calendar).

== Background ==
Three years after his third piano concerto was finished, Rachmaninoff moved with his family to a house in Rome that Pyotr Ilyich Tchaikovsky had used. It was during this time in Rome that Rachmaninoff started working on his Second Piano Sonata.

However, because both of his daughters contracted typhoid fever, he was unable to finish the composition in Rome. Instead, Rachmaninoff moved his family on to Berlin in order to consult with doctors. When the girls were well enough, Rachmaninoff traveled with his family back to his Ivanovka country estate, where he finished the Second Piano Sonata.

== Composition ==
The sonata is in three interrelated movements:

1. Allegro agitato (B♭ minor)
2. Non allegro—Lento (E minor—E major)
3. Allegro molto (B♭ major)

It is unified by two Non allegro bridges between the movements. The outer movements follow sonata form.

=== Original edition ===
==== I. Allegro agitato ====
The first movement of the second piano sonata is in sonata allegro form. The exposition begins with the first theme, which has a descending arpeggio that ends with a low B♭ octave followed by a B♭ minor chord. The first theme area lasts until a cadenza-like passage creates a bridge into the second theme area. The second theme is in D♭ major, with a chorale-like texture that contrasts with the brilliance of the first theme.

In the development section, which is split into three parts, there is much tonal instability with constantly changing key centers. Parts of this section use the left hand to imitate bells, with chromatic descending, alternating sevenths and thirds.

The recapitulation restates the first two themes in B♭ minor. The final section of an extension to the recapitulation alternates between B♭ major and B♭ minor, leaving the tonic unclear until the coda. The coda, clearly in B♭ minor, repeats two themes seen earlier in the movement.

==== II. Non allegro – Lento ====
The second movement of the Piano Sonata is in two-part ternary form. A seven-measure interlude in G major links the first and second movements, after which there is a relative minor key area (E minor). The second movement's main theme is based on a motive of a sequentially repeated falling third.

The second movement references material from the first movement, which is the first instance of cyclic unity in the sonata. For example, in the middle-section of this movement, the bell texture from the first movement is reestablished.

==== III. Allegro molto ====
The third movement begins with a repetition of the interlude to the second movement, with the meter shifted from 4/4 to 3/4. This movement, again in sonata-allegro form, further utilizes cyclic unity by using themes from the first movement. The transition to the second theme area of the exposition introduces a new theme (in D major), unusual in sonata-allegro form.

The development section, as in the first movement, is also split into three sub-sections. Similar to the exposition, it uses themes from the first movement in addition to the new themes introduced in the exposition.

The recapitulation is in B♭ major, and states the first theme from the third movement only once. It utilizes another past theme expansively to lead toward the coda. The coda utilizes themes from the first movement and is highly chromatic and brilliant.

=== Revised edition ===
When Rachmaninoff performed the piece at its premiere in Moscow, it was well received. However, Rachmaninoff himself was not satisfied with the work and felt that too much in the piece was superfluous. Thus, in 1931, he commenced work on a revision. Major cuts were made to the middle sections of the second and third movements and all three sections of the first movement, and some technically difficult passages were simplified.

A performance of the original version lasts approximately 25 minutes, while a performance of the revised version lasts approximately 19 minutes.

=== Horowitz's revision ===
In 1940, with the composer's consent, Vladimir Horowitz created his own edition which combined elements of both the original and revised versions. His edition used more original material than the revised version throughout all three movements. A performance of the Horowitz revision lasts approximately 22 minutes.
