= Ständchen (Schubert) =

Franz Schubert composed a number of works known as Ständchen, meaning serenade.

== Lieder ==
Lieder named "Ständchen" or "Abendständchen" (evening serenade):

- "Abendständchen an Lina" ("Sei sanft wie ihre Seele"), D 265, for voice and piano, words by Gabriele von Baumberg
- "Ständchen", D 889 ("Horch, horch! die Lerch im Ätherblau" / "Hark, hark, the lark"), after Shakespeare's Cymbeline.
- "Ständchen" ("Leise flehen meine Lieder"), No. 4 of Schwanengesang (Swan Song), D 957.

== Part songs ==
Part songs known as "Ständchen" or "Nächtliches Ständchen" (serenade at night):

- "Leise, leise laßt uns singen, schlummre sanft", D 635, also known as "Ruhe", or "Nächtliches Ständchen".
  This work is for TTBB, having the title "Quartetto" in the composer's autograph (manuscript MH 1864/c in Vienna City Library). This autograph contains the text of a single stanza, of which the text author is unknown. Eusebius Mandyczewski suggests Schubert may have been the text author. Variant versions of the text, in multiple stanzas, originated posthumously.
  In 1900 the music was published as "Ständchen", with lyrics by Robert Graf. Anton Weiß is the text author of another version. Mandyczewski was the first to publish the song with its original text version (1906–1907).
- "Ständchen" ("Zögernd leise, in des Dunkels nächt'ger Hülle"), D 920/921, for alto solo, TTBB or SSAA chorus and piano, words by Franz Grillparzer

== See also ==
- Ständchen (disambiguation)
