= Giedrė Dirvanauskaitė =

Lithuanian cellist

Giedrė Dirvanauskaitė is a Lithuanian cellist.

A founding member of the Kremerata Baltica, she continues to serve as principal cellist. She has performed with symphony orchestras in Europe, Asia, and the Middle East. Her chamber music collaborators include such artists as Martha Argerich, Heinz Holliger, Yuri Bashmet, Sa Chen, Gidon Kremer, Daniil Trifonov, and Khatia Buniatishvili.

In 2015, Dirvanauskaitė was nominated for a Grammy Award for Best Classical Compendium. In 2017, she collaborated with Daniil Trifonov and Gidon Kremer in a recording of trios by Rachmaninoff, which was released by Deutsche Grammophon in 2017.
