= Maximilian Hornung =

German cellist

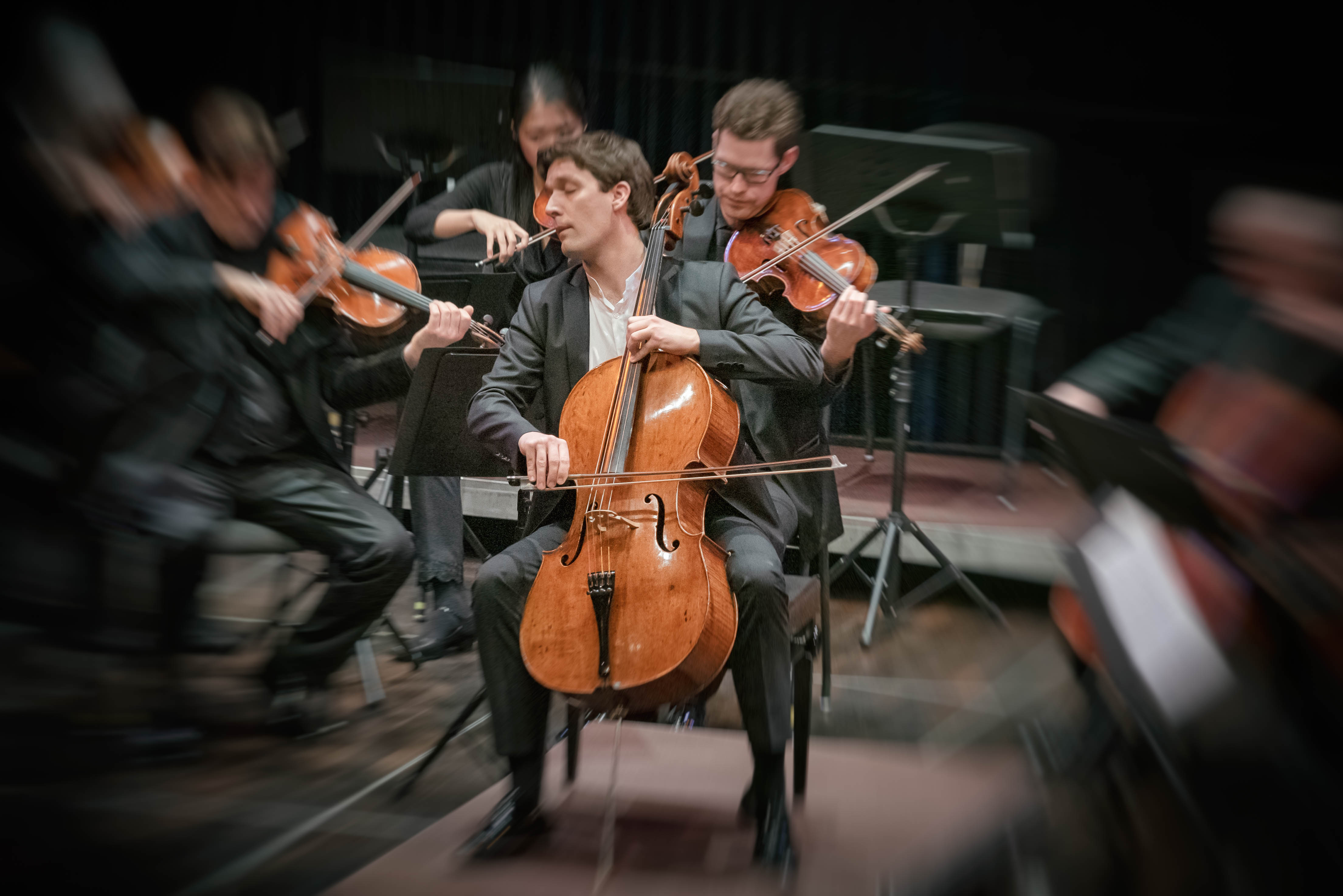
Maximilian Hornung with the Munich Chamber Orchestra, 2019

Maximilian Hornung (born 1986 in Augsburg, Bavaria) is a German cellist.

He grew up in a family of musicians and attended the Gymnasium at St. Stephan in Augsburg (a school offering a musical branch with music, Latin and English as core subjects from grade five onwards). He left the school at the age of 16 to devote himself entirely to music. He studied with Eldar Issakadze, Thomas Grossenbacher and David Geringas.

In 2005, he won the German Music Competition, in 2007 the ARD Music Competition with a trio he founded. At the age of 23 he received the post of the first solo cellist of the Bavarian Radio Symphony Orchestra. He left after four years to devote himself entirely to solo and chamber music work.

In 2011, he received the ECHO Klassik Prize as a young artist of the year, the Bavarian Kunstförderpreis in 2014 and the European Prize for the European Cultural Foundation in 2015.

He has performed as a soloist with major orchestras, collaborating with conductors such as Bernard Haitink and Daniel Harding.

In the United States, he has performed with the Florida Orchestra. Hornung returned to the Tampa - St. Petersburg area to play Antonín Dvořák's Cello Concerto with the Florida Orchestra on 19 and 20 January 2018.

== Discography ==
- Jump! (with Milana Chernyavska, 2010)
- Saint-Saëns: Suite and Romance / Dvořák: Cello Concerto (2012)
- Gassenhauer (with Nils Mönkemeyer, 2013)
- Richard Strauss: Don Quixote & Cello Sonata, Op. 6 (2014)
