= Notturno (Schubert) =

1827 piano trio composition

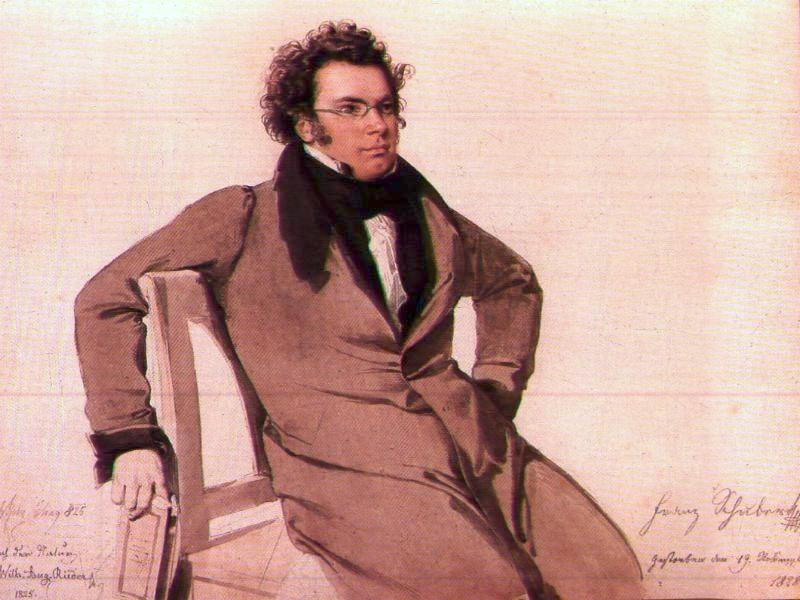
Watercolour of Franz Schubert by Wilhelm August Rieder (1825)

The Notturno in E♭ major, Op. 148 (D. 897), also called Adagio, is a nocturne for piano trio (i.e. piano, violin, and cello) by Franz Schubert.

== Description ==
This substantial but relatively neglected piece has affinities with the slow movements of both the String Quintet in C major D. 956, and the Piano Trio No. 1, D 898. Completed in the Autumn of 1827, it is possibly a rejected slow movement of the Piano Trio No. 1. It has the sublime slowness of the string quintet movement (in one recording of the Notturno, by the Beaux Arts Trio, Schubert takes half a minute to leave the opening tonic harmony), together with a similar use of pizzicato at various points, and with the same paradoxical effect: the pizzicato decorations of the main tune seem to enhance the underlying tragedy of the music, rather than lightening it.

The main thematic idea has a characteristic common to a number of Schubert's most celebrated melodic ideas, including the second subjects of both the C major string quintet's first movement and the "Unfinished" Symphony No. 8's first movement: that of "not going anywhere", pitch-wise, but seeming to revolve round a single note (the third note of the scale in this case).

== Formal structure ==
The Notturno is in extended ternary form (ABABA). The first episode is in the 'Neapolitan' key, the flattened supertonic major (theoretically F♭, but written as E major). The main melodic idea of the episode is a three-note, dotted figure, which has an almost martial, march-like quality, despite the continued slowness of the music's underlying tempo, thus providing a contrast with the opening section while not disturbing the unity of the piece.

The second episode repeats the material of the first episode, but in the submediant major (C major).

The transition back to the opening material at the end of both episodes incorporates a long dominant preparation. The first of these transitions starts in F major, the key in which the first episode has ended, and progresses by a series of modulations to the home key of E♭, anchored by a bass line descending largely by step.

The second transition is tonally unnecessary, in the sense that the episode has already landed back on the tonic, E♭, with an emphatic cadence; but Schubert disguises this fact by carrying out a feint towards F major again, the key in which the first episode had ended. This excursion Schubert uses as an opportunity for further harmonic progressions.

In its third and final appearance the opening tune is decorated with trills in the upper register of the piano.
