= Mazurkas, Op. 56 (Chopin) =

No. 1 in B major

No. 2 in C major

No. 3 in C minor
Performed by Xuan He

The Op. 56 mazurkas by Frédéric Chopin are a set of three mazurkas for solo piano. They were presumably written in 1843–1844 and were published in 1844 with a dedication to a certain Mlle Maberly.

The three mazurkas are in B major, C major, and C minor and are marked Allergo non tanto, Vivace, Moderato, respectively. A typical performance of all three mazurkas lasts around 12 minutes.

== Structure ==
The three pieces are as follows:

1. Allegro non tanto (B major)
2. Vivace (C major)
3. Moderato (C minor)

Op. 56 No. 1 in B major is notable for its major-third-related 5-part rondo structure (B major–E♭ major–B major–G major–B major).

Op. 56 No. 2 in C major contains four distinct sections, with the first returning at the end to form A-B-C-D-A. Section D contains a canon initiated by the right hand.
