= Trio élégiaque No. 1 (Rachmaninoff) =

Piano trio by Sergei Rachmaninoff

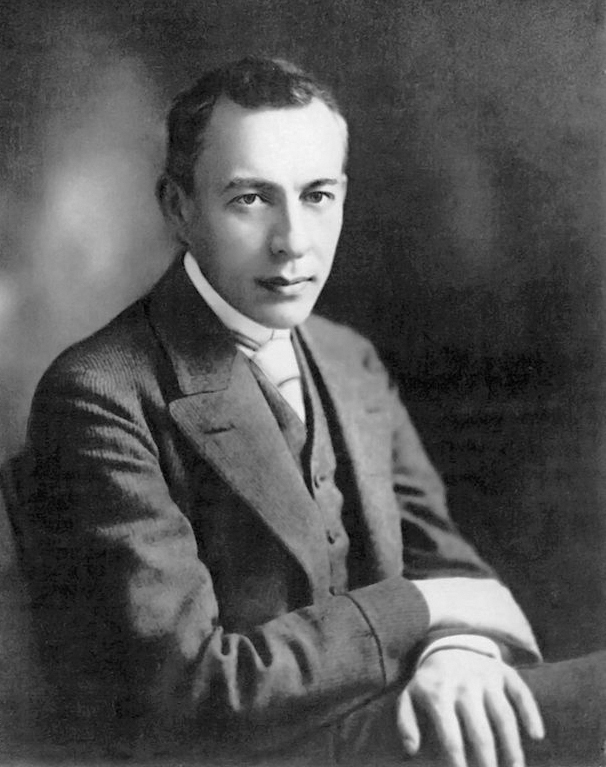
Sergei Rachmaninoff circa 1900

Trio élégiaque No. 1 in G minor is a composition for piano trio (piano, violin and cello) by Sergei Rachmaninoff.

== History ==
The trio was written on January 18–21, 1892 in Moscow, when the composer was 18 years old. The work was first performed on January 30 of the same year with the composer at the piano, David Kreyn at the violin and Anatoliy Brandukov at the cello. It waited until 1947 for the first edition to appear, and the trio has no designated opus number. Rachmaninoff wrote a second Elegiac piano trio in 1893 after the death of Tchaikovsky.

== Structure ==
This work is cast in only one movement, in contrast to most piano trios, which have three or four. This movement is in the classical form of a sonata, but the exposition is built on twelve episodes that are symmetrically represented in the recapitulation. The elegiac theme is presented in the first part Lento lugubre by the piano. In the following parts, the elegy is presented by the cello and violin, while the spirit is constantly evolving (più vivo - con anima - appassionato - tempo rubato - risoluto). The theme is ultimately recast as a funeral march.

Despite his youth, Rachmaninoff shows in the virtuoso piano part his ability to cover a wide spectrum of sound colors. This trio has a distinctive connection to Tchaikovsky's Trio in A minor, both in the unusual, expanded first movement, and in the funeral march as a conclusion.

The suggestion often heard - that the first trio is an early elegy for Tchaikovsky - is doubtful: in 1892 the elder composer was in good health, and there was no premonition of the sudden illness that would kill him nearly two years later. Rather, the key to the connection with Tchaikovsky of this first trio is its repetitive opening theme, a four-note rising motif, that dominates the 15-minute work. Played backwards in the same rhythm it is exactly the opening descending motif of Tchaikovsky's first piano concerto (written 1874-75), and the allusion would have been apparent to listeners and teachers at the university, as would the closing funeral march imitative of Tchaikovsky's elegy to Nikolai Rubinstein. Rachmaninoff wrote this first trio while still a student and may well have intended it as an homage to his elder friend and mentor. The second trio, written two years later, was the true "elegiac" work mourning Tchaikovsky's death.
