= Left hand =

The Left Hand or Left hand may refer to:

- One of a pair of organs of the primate body, called hands, attached to the arms at the wrists
  - Left-handedness, a term referring to a person who primarily uses their left hand to accomplish tasks and activities
- Left Hand (comics), a comic book character owned by Marvel Comics
- Left Hand (Vampire Hunter D), a character from the Vampire Hunter D series of books, published in Japan
- Left Hand (manga), a Japanese manga
- Left Hand, West Virginia, a community in the United States
- Left Hand Brewing Company, a brewery located in Longmont, Colorado
- Left-hand path and right-hand path, terms describing the two different/opposing belief systems
- Left hand screw thread, screws threaded in the opposite direction of the more common right hand threads
- LeftHand StoreVirtual, Hewlett-Packard storage products for computing, see HP StorageWorks
- "The Left Hand" (Dollhouse), a 2009 episode of the television series Dollhouse
- The Left Hand, a pen name used by Benjamin Franklin

== See also ==
- The Left Hand of Darkness, a 1969 science fiction novel by U.S. writer Ursula K. Le Guin
