= Anatoliy Brandukov =

Russian cellist (1859–1930)

- Анатолий Брандуков
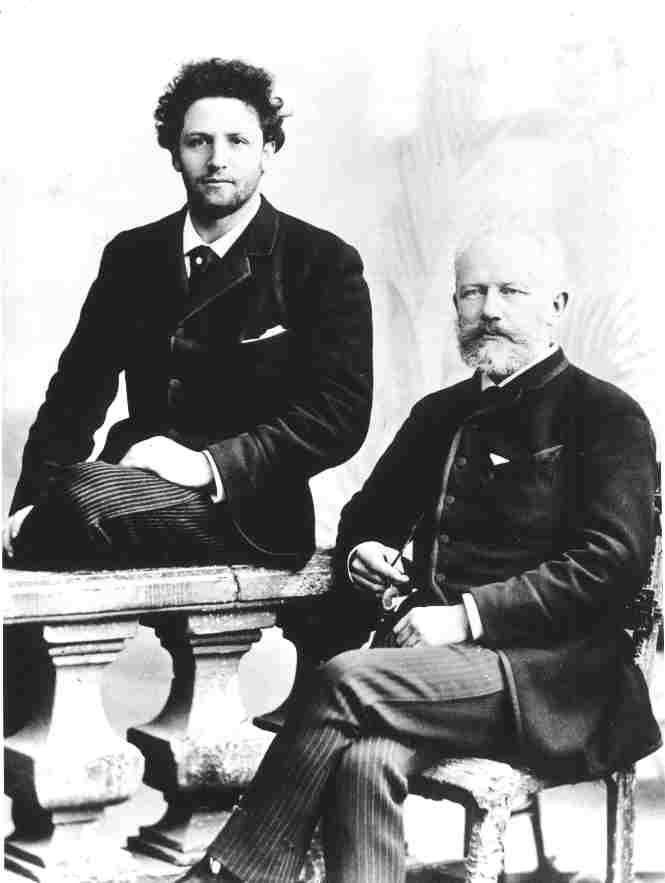
- Brandukov (left) with Pyotr Ilyich Tchaikovsky
- Born: January 6, 1859; Moscow, Russia
- Died: February 16, 1930 (aged 71); Moscow, Soviet Union
- Occupation: Cellist

Anatoly Andreyevich Brandukov (Note: Russian: Анатолий Андреевич Брандуков, romanized: Anatoly Andreyevich Brandukov) (6 January 1859 [O.S. 25 December 1858]^{[a]} – February 16, 1930) was a Russian cellist who premiered many cello pieces of prominent composers including Pyotr Tchaikovsky and Sergei Rachmaninoff. Born as Russian classical music was flourishing in the middle of the 19th century, he worked with many of the important composers and musicians of the day, including performances with Anton Rubinstein and Alexander Siloti. As a soloist, he excelled in performance and was especially noted for stylish interpretations, his refined temperament, and beautiful, expressive tone. In his later years, he became a professor at Moscow Conservatory, and continued to perform well into his later life. Although his popularity is obscured by the more famous composers and virtuosos, his influence on those composers' most prominent compositions is evident.

== Life and work ==
Anatoliy Andreyevich Brandukov was born in Moscow on January 6, 1859. His father died soon after his birth, so he was raised by his mother and aunt. His first exposure to classical music was the Bolshoi Theater, in which his sister danced. But the most decisive influence on him was hearing Hector Berlioz conduct Beethoven's Fifth Symphony when the French composer visited St Petersburg and Moscow in 1867-68. He learned the cello, and at age eight, began to attend Moscow Conservatory. While there, he attracted the attention of professionals, professors, and the public. He became a student of German cello virtuoso Wilhelm Fitzenhagen, discussed music theory with Tchaikovsky, and played in string quartets with celebrity musicians. He graduated in 1877 with the rare conservatory award, the Gold Medal.

On March 5, 1878, he gave his first solo concert, sponsored by Nikolai Rubinstein, but unable to secure a permanent audience, he went abroad. Although he had marginal success alone, he decided to go to the musical mecca of the time—Paris. From 1881 to 1889 he lived in France, giving concerts in London. Contemporary pianist and composer Aleksandr Goldenweiser said of him, "His vivid, emotional performances were alien abstraction and judgment." He assisted writer Ivan Turgenev, and through him made many friends and connections, among them pianists Anton Rubinstein, Anna Yesipova, and Alexander Siloti, and conductor Leopold Auer. After a performance of Saint-Saëns' Cello Concerto No. 1 in 1881, he was invited to a celebratory concert highlighting his achievement in Angers, France.

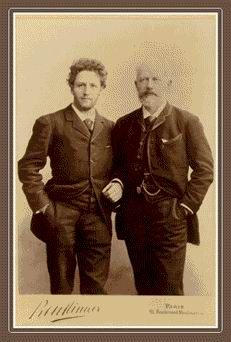
Brandukov and Tchaikovsky, in Paris, 1888

In 1890, Tchaikovsky urged the Moscow Conservatory to hire him as cello professor, but the Director of the school, Vasily Safonov, declined, believing him too young for the job. Brandukov spent time in Lausanne, Switzerland, and in Paris, performing the Saint-Saens Cello Concerto with the composer conducting. He helped the 19-year old Sergei Rachmaninoff give his first independent concert, by playing some new works in his debut in 1892. At this time he wrote fourteen pieces for cello, two for cello and orchestra.^{[b]}

In 1906, he was appointed professor and director of the Moscow Philharmonic School of Music and Drama, and became a professor at the Moscow Conservatory in 1921, turning down an offer to work at the Accademia Nazionale di Santa Cecilia. One of his pupils was Ukrainian cellist Gregor Piatigorsky, who would go on to be hailed as "the last great Romantic." In Moscow he married the wealthy Nadezhda Mazurina and had a son, Alexander (Sasha). During World War I, which started in 1914, he often spoke at charity events for wounded soldiers. As a professor, he enjoyed interacting with his students on a very personal level. A student, known only as A. V. Brouna, commented that, "Brandukov was not a teacher in the conventional sense. This was a close friend, generously spreading his spiritual wealth, whose lessons became a revelation..." After the 1917 October Revolution, he became a member of the Bolshoi Theater, organizing the symphony orchestra and speaking at concert events. Heinrich Neuhaus, one of his partners at the Theater, reported that in 1919, on the way to a concert, Brandukov slipped and fell on his cello. When the cover was removed, Neuhaus recalls, Brandukov "embraced his cello, as a living creature, tears and tears from his eyes."

In his later years, he continued to perform and give lectures, last speaking with Neuhaus on January 30, 1930. He died in Moscow on February 16, 1930, aged 71.

== Contemporaries ==
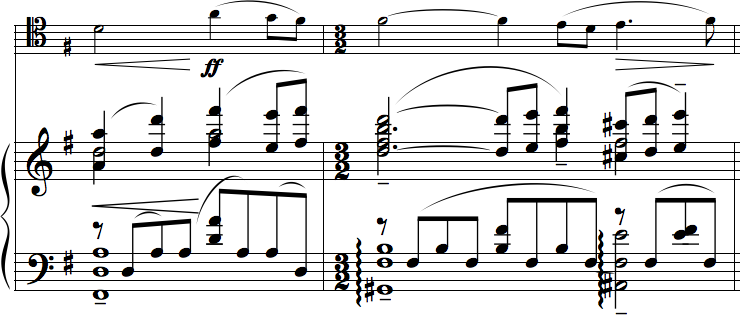
Rachmaninoff dedicated his Cello Sonata (Op. 19) to Brandukov.

Brandukov had a beneficial relationship with the composer, Sergei Rachmaninoff. In Rachmaninoff's first independent concert on February 11, 1892, Brandukov performed his Trio elégiaque No. 1 (1892) and the Prélude from his Prélude et Danse orientale (Op. 2). The cellist also performed a revised version of the Trio on February 25, 1907. Rachmaninoff dedicated his Cello Sonata (Op. 19) to Brandukov, who also premiered this piece with the composer in Moscow on December 15, 1901. At Rachmaninoff's wedding on May 12, 1902, Brandukov was his best man. Emanuel Moór's Cello Sonata No. 2 in G Major, Op. 55, was written in joint dedication to Brandukov and his wife.

Pyotr Ilyich Tchaikovsky was instrumental in securing Brandukov's success. Tchaikovsky greatly admired Brandukov's playing, and in the summer of 1887 sent a few pages of the Pezzo Capriccioso to him for his opinion. He modified it without consulting the composer, and gave the Paris premiere in 1888. It was published in this form, dedicated to Brandukov.^{[c]}

== Notes ==
- a. Until 1918 Russia used the Julian calendar (old style) The modern calendar used worldwide is the Gregorian (new style), which is 12 days ahead of the Julian in the nineteenth century.
- b. The autograph manuscripts of these pieces are preserved in the Tchaikovsky House-Museum in Klin, Russia.
- c. Some present-day cellists prefer the original version.
