= Trois mouvements de Petrouchka =

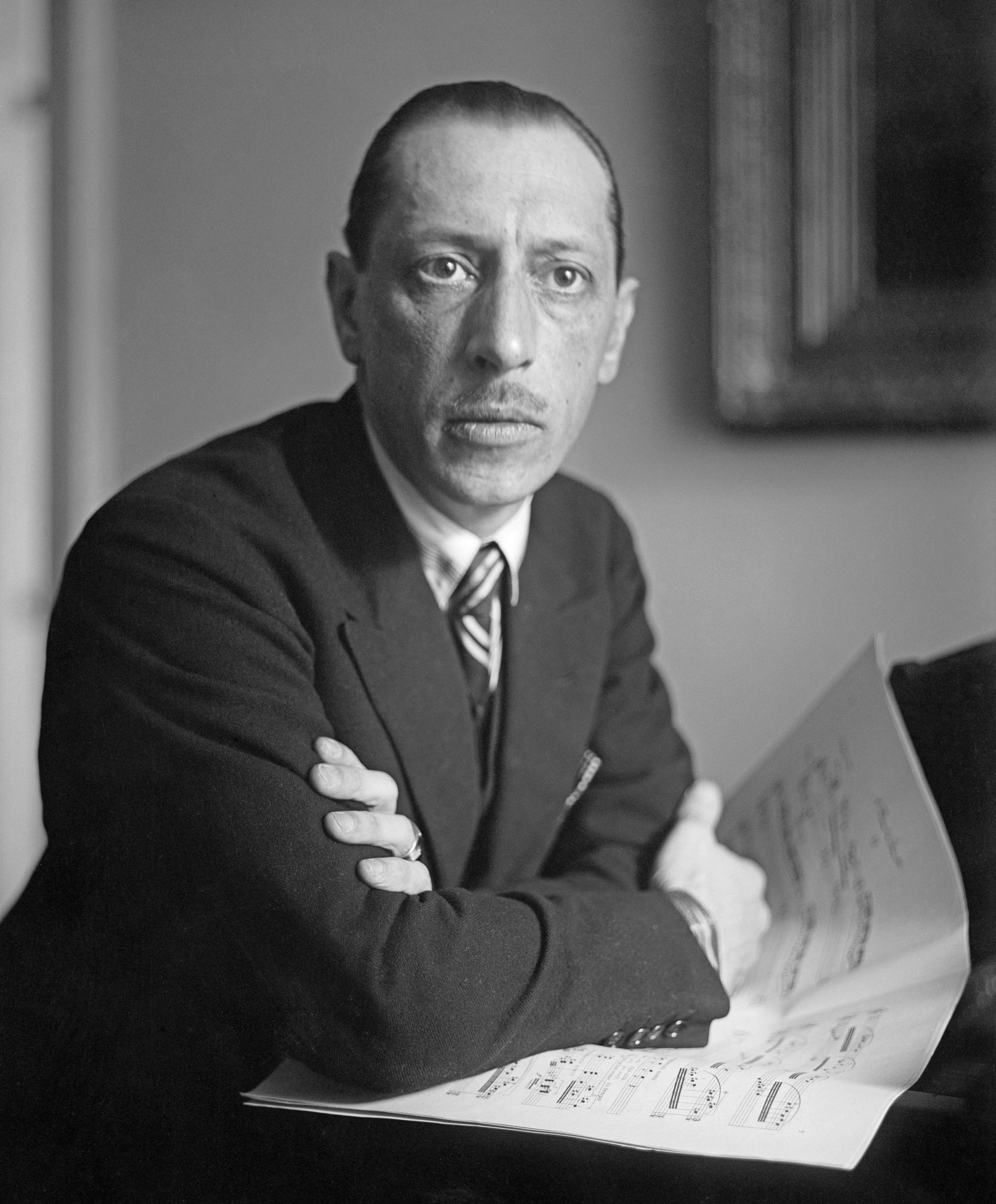
Igor Stravinsky, at the time of the composition

Trois mouvements de Petrouchka or Three Movements from Petrushka is an arrangement for piano of music from the ballet Petrushka by the composer Igor Stravinsky for the pianist Arthur Rubinstein.

== History ==
Sergei Diaghilev, who had commissioned The Firebird from Stravinsky for his new ballet company, the Ballets Russes, had expected Stravinsky would follow the ballet with another dance work, The Rite of Spring. The idea for such a work had occurred to Stravinsky while still working on The Firebird, but Stravinsky felt the need to write something unrelated to the theater and conceived an orchestral work in which the piano would have a prominent part: Stravinsky himself used the word Konzertstück for the composition.

Stravinsky relates that he had in mind a distinct picture of a puppet who tried the patience of the orchestra with "diabolical cascades of arpeggios." In turn, the orchestra retaliates with trumpet blasts and after reaching a climax, the conflict ends with the collapse of the puppet. Stravinsky recalled that after completing the piece, he searched vainly for an appropriate name for his puppet until he remembered Petrushka, a popular hero of country fairs everywhere.

In the fall of 1910, Diaghilev came to visit Stravinsky, who at that time was living in Lausanne, Switzerland, expecting to hear the beginning of The Rite of Spring, but instead was greeted with Petrushka. Diaghilev immediately recognized the possibilities of developing this orchestral work into a full length stage work. Thus, the concert piece became the second part of the ballet Petrushka. The full score was completed on 11 May 1911, and on the following 13 June Petrushka was performed by Diaghilev's Ballets Russes at the Theatre du Chatelet in Paris, under the baton of Pierre Monteux.

Three Movements from Petrushka for the solo piano were composed ten years later for his friend, pianist Arthur Rubinstein, and are dedicated to him. Stravinsky is very explicit in stating that the movements are not transcriptions. He was not trying to reproduce the sound of the orchestra, but instead wished to compose a score which would be essentially pianistic even though its musical material was drawn directly from the ballet. Stravinsky also wanted to create a work which would encourage pianists to play his music, but it should be one in which they could display their technique, an objective he amply achieved.

== Structure ==
The three movements are as follows:

1. Danse russe (Russian Dance)
2. Chez Pétrouchka (Petrushka's Room)
3. La semaine grasse (The Shrovetide Fair)

The first movement, "Danse Russe", is drawn from the closing part of the first scene of the ballet. The next part, "Chez Pétrouchka", is the second scene of the stage work, while the final movement, "La semaine grasse", includes the whole of the fourth scene up to the end of the Masqueraders section to which Stravinsky added an ending which he later incorporated in his 1947 revised version of the ballet for concert performances.

He completed the three movements in August 1921 at Anglet, France.

Stravinsky's goal in arranging Petrushka for the piano (along with Piano-Rag-Music) was to attempt to influence Arthur Rubinstein into playing his music. (A 1961 live recording featuring Rubinstein at Carnegie Hall was published in 2012.) In order to gain the latter's attention, Stravinsky ensured that Rubinstein would find the arrangement technically challenging but musically satisfying. Trois mouvements de Petrouchka reflects the composer's intentions and, unsurprisingly, it is renowned for its notorious technical and musical difficulties. All three movements include wild and rapid jumps which span over two octaves, complex polyrhythms, extremely fast scales, and tremolos. The third and largest movement is known for long, relentless trills in thirds, some even in the four fingers of the left hand while the thumb carries a separate melody.
