= Verbier Festival =

Music festival

- Genre: Classical music
- Dates: July/August
- Locations: Verbier, Switzerland
- Years active: 1994–present
- Website: verbierfestival.com

The Verbier Festival is a two week annual international music festival which is held in late July and early August in the mountain resort of Verbier southeast of Lausanne, Switzerland.

Begun by Swedish expatriate Martin T:son Engström in 1994, it has attracted international soloists such as Piotr Anderszewski, Leif Ove Andsnes, Martha Argerich, Lera Auerbach, Emanuel Ax, Sergei Babayan, Khatia Buniatishvili, Seong-Jin Cho (2018), Hilary Hahn, Leonidas Kavakos, Evgeny Kissin, Magdalena Kožená, Lang Lang, Mischa Maisky, Mikhail Pletnev, Lawrence Power, Thomas Quasthoff, Julian Rachlin, Andrea Rost, Anoushka Shankar, András Schiff, Nathalie Stutzmann, Bryn Terfel, Daniil Trifonov, Yuja Wang, Julian Lloyd Webber, Gautier Capuçon, and Renaud Capuçon.

The Verbier Festival nurtures young musicians with its academy and three orchestras: the Verbier Festival Orchestra, the Verbier Festival Chamber Orchestra and the Verbier Festival Junior Orchestra (formerly known as the Verbier Festival Music Camp Orchestra).

The Verbier Festival honours the finest performance from its academy with the Prix Yves Paternot. The prize was established in the memory of Yves Paternot, a founding member of The Friends of the Verbier Festival and a long-serving member of the Foundation’s Board.

Activities of the Fest'Off, called UNLTD, including jazz concerts and special walks in the environs of Verbier, are available to the public for mostly free during the 17 days of the festival.
