= Trio élégiaque No. 2 (Rachmaninoff) =

1893 piano trio by Sergei Rachmaninoff

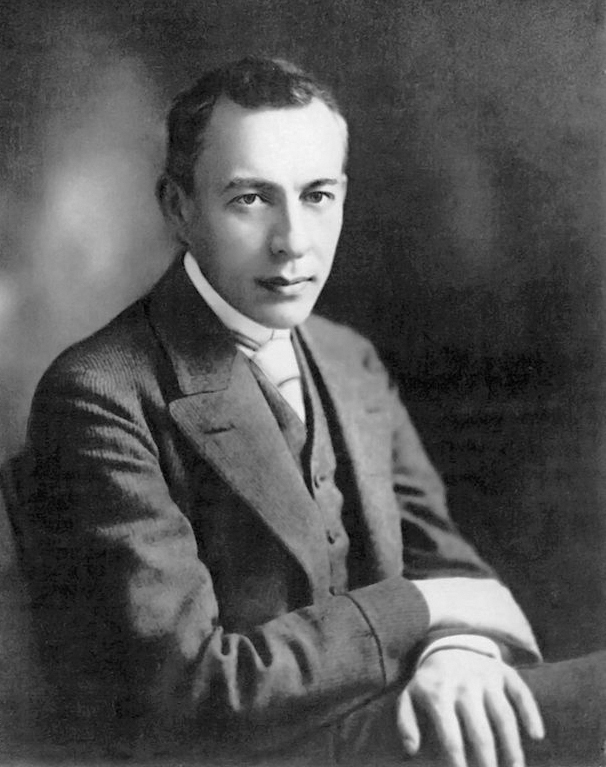
Sergei Rachmaninoff circa 1900

Sergei Rachmaninoff's Trio élégiaque No. 2 in D minor, Op. 9 is a piano trio which he began composing on 25 October 1893 and completed on 15 December that year. It was written in memory of Tchaikovsky and was inscribed with the dedication "In Memory of a Great Artist". It was first performed in Moscow on 31 January 1894 by Rachmaninoff himself, the violinist Julius Conus, and the cellist Anatoli Brandukov.

== Structure ==
The trio is in three movements, taking approximately 50 minutes to perform:

1. Moderato (D minor)
2. Quasi variazione (F major)
3. Allegro risoluto (D minor)

The first movement starts with a sombre tone along with increasingly complex and powerful musical ideas, which return in both the second movement and at the close of the final movement. The opening bars of this movement return as the climax of the last movement.

The second movement consists of eight variations upon the main theme of Rachmaninoff's symphonic poem The Rock.

The final movement, although short in comparison to the previous movements, is dominated by the unceasingly powerful and dramatic piano part.

This piano trio is similar to Tchaikovsky's Trio in A minor, which was dedicated to Nikolai Rubinstein; it follows the same basic structure.

== Reception and later revisions ==
In 1907, Rachmaninoff cut and revised the work for a second edition, and in 1917, he made further cuts which were incorporated into the 1950 Muzgiz edition of the piece. According to biographer Barrie Martyn, the work has never achieved much attention and "has been all but ignored outside of Russia".

The Australian pianist Alan Kogosowski orchestrated the trio as a piano concerto, Concerto Élégiaque in D minor, Op. 9b. This is recorded with Alan Kogosowski, pianist, and the Detroit Symphony Orchestra conducted by Neeme Järvi: Rachmaninov: Transcriptions for Orchestra, also including Dumbravaneau's orchestration of [Variations on a Theme of Corelli Op, 42, and Rachmaninov's orchestral version of Vocalise Op. 34 No. 14, Chandos CHAN 9261 (1994).
