= Variations on a Theme of Chopin (Rachmaninoff) =

Piano composition by Sergei Rachmaninoff

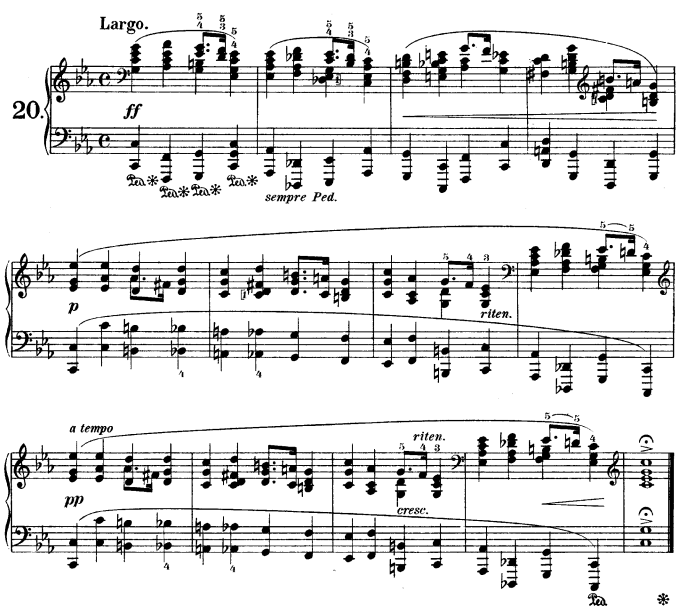
Chopin's Prelude No. 20 in C minor. Rachmaninoff uses only the first 8 bars plus end-chord, and changes the E♭ in the last chord of bar 3 to E♮.

Variations on a Theme of Chopin (Russian: Вариации на тему Ф. Шопена, Variatsii na temu F. Shopena), Op. 22, is a group of 22 variations on Frédéric Chopin's Prelude in C minor (Op. 28, No. 20), composed by Sergei Rachmaninoff in 1902–03. In the first edition, it is noted that 3 of the variations and the final Presto section can be omitted if the performer wishes.

== Variations ==
The form of the piece is:

Theme: Largo, 9 bars

| Variation | Tempo marking | Key | Description | Score |
|---|---|---|---|---|
| I | Moderato (66 bpm) | C minor | 8 bars | |
| II | Allegro (132 bpm) | C minor | 8 bars | |
| III | 132 bpm | C minor | 8 bars | |
| IV | 132 bpm | C minor | 24 bars of 3/4 | |
| V | Meno mosso (92 bpm) | C minor | 8 bars | |
| VI | Meno mosso (84 bpm) | C minor | 8 bars 12 bars of 6/4 | |
| VII | Allegro (120 bpm) | C minor | 8 bars *This variation may be omitted | |
| VIII | 120 bpm | C minor | 8 bars | |
| IX | 120 bpm | C minor | 8 bars | |
| X | Più vivo (144 bpm) | C minor | 14 bars *This variation may be omitted | |
| XI | Lento (44 bpm) | E♭ major | 14 bars of 12/8 | |
| XII | Moderato (60 bpm) | C minor | 32 bars *This variation may be omitted | |
| XIII | Largo (52 bpm) | C minor | 16 bars | |
| XIV | Moderato (72 bpm) | C minor | 24 bars of 4/4 then one bar of 2/4 | |
| XV | Allegro scherzando (132 bpm) | F minor | 45 bars of 12/8 in F minor | |
| XVI | Lento (54 bpm) | F minor | 14 bars in F minor | |
| XVII | Grave (46 bpm) | B♭ minor | 18 bars of 3/4 in B♭ minor | |
| XVIII | Più mosso | B♭ minor | 12 bars in B♭ minor | |
| XIX | Allegro vivace | A major | 35 bars in A major | |
| XX | Presto (92 bpm) | C♯ minor | 108 bars of 3/4 in A major and C♯ minor | |
| XXI | Andante (60 bpm) - Più vivo (100 bpm) | D♭ major C major | 24 bars in D♭ major followed by 29 bars of 3/4 in C major marked Più vivo (100 bpm) | |
| XXII | Maestoso (100 bpm) | C major | 82 bars of 3/4 in C major. Then 12 bars marked Meno mosso. Finally, 19 bars marked Presto (These final 19 bars may be omitted) | |

== See also ==
- List of variations on a theme by another composer
