= Piano Concerto No. 3 (Rachmaninoff) =

Work by Sergei Rachmaninoff

- by Sergei Rachmaninoff
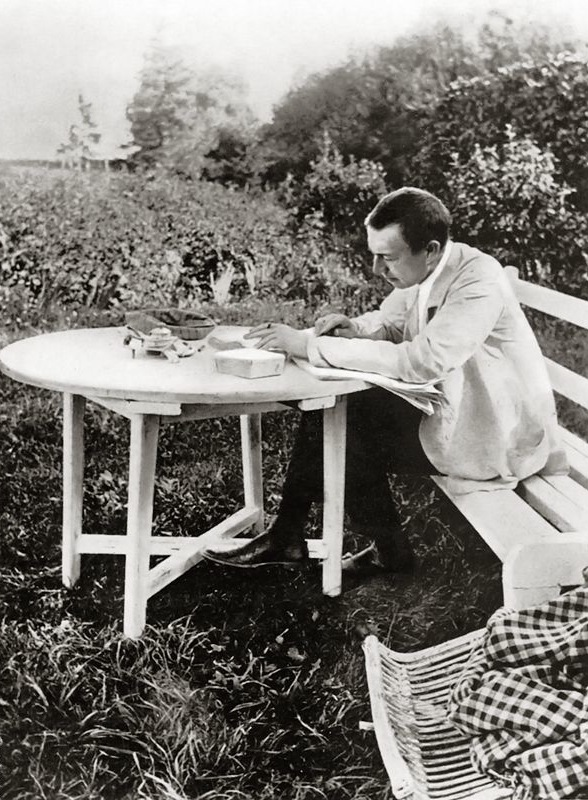
- Rachmaninoff proofing copies of the concerto in 1910
- Key: D minor
- Opus: Op. 30
- Composed: Summer 1909
- Dedication: Josef Hofmann
- Duration: Approx. 41 minutes
- Movements: Three
- Scoring: Piano; orchestra

Premiere
- Date: 28 November 1909
- Location: New York City
- Performers: Sergei Rachmaninoff (piano), Walter Damrosch (conductor)

Sergei Rachmaninoff's Piano Concerto No. 3 in D minor, Op. 30, was composed in the summer of 1909. The piece was premiered on November 28 of that year in New York City with the composer as soloist, accompanied by the New York Symphony Society under Walter Damrosch. The work has the reputation of being one of the most technically challenging piano concertos in the standard classical piano repertoire.

== History ==
=== Background and premiere ===
Rachmaninoff composed the concerto in Dresden completing it on September 23, 1909. Contemporary with this work are his First Piano Sonata and his tone poem The Isle of the Dead.

Owing to its difficulty, the concerto is respected, even feared, by many pianists. Josef Hofmann, the pianist to whom the work is dedicated, never publicly performed it, saying that it "wasn't for" him. Gary Graffman lamented he had not learned this concerto as a student, when he was "still too young to know fear".

Due to time constraints, Rachmaninoff could not practice the piece while in Russia. Instead, he practiced it on a silent keyboard that he brought with him while en route to the United States. The concerto was first performed on Sunday, November 28, 1909, at the New Theatre in New York City. Rachmaninoff was the soloist, with the New York Symphony Society with Walter Damrosch conducting. The work received a second performance under Gustav Mahler on January 16, 1910, an "experience Rachmaninoff treasured". Rachmaninoff later described the rehearsal to Riesemann:

At that time Mahler was the only conductor whom I considered worthy to be classed with Nikisch. He devoted himself to the concerto until the accompaniment, which is rather complicated, had been practiced to perfection, although he had already gone through another long rehearsal. According to Mahler, every detail of the score was important – an attitude too rare amongst conductors. ... Though the rehearsal was scheduled to end at 12:30, we played and played, far beyond this hour, and when Mahler announced that the first movement would be rehearsed again, I expected some protest or scene from the musicians, but I did not notice a single sign of annoyance. The orchestra played the first movement with a keen or perhaps even closer appreciation than the previous time.

The score was first published in 1910 by Gutheil. Rachmaninoff called the Third the favorite of his own piano concertos, stating that "I much prefer the Third, because my Second is so uncomfortable to play."

=== Changing public opinion and future performances ===
Public opinion regarding the Third Concerto was mixed following the premiere in New York. On November 30, 1909, two days after the premiere, a critic for the New York Sun wrote "Sound, reasonable music this, though not a great nor memorable proclamation." The New York Times, a few months later, included a review of Rachmaninoff's work: "On this occasion the favorable impression it had made when it was played before was deepened. It is more mature, more finished, more interesting in its structure, and more effective than Rachmaninoff's other compositions in this form...but it was felt by many yesterday...that many another pianist could play it better than the composer."

However, by 1919, public perception of the concerto (as well as Rachmaninoff's pianistic capabilities) turned more positive. He was increasingly praised for his commitment to resonance and musicality rather than a display of technique and virtuosity. The concerto was "affected by this new appreciation for his convictions", according to Ruby Cheng. In a 1930 letter, Rachmaninoff's brother-in-law Vladimir Satin expressed a feeling of nostalgia for a "lost Russia", thanking him for allowing listeners to live in the "good past" and forget the "bad future". Rachmaninoff became a symbol of an old, nationalistic identity of Russia; many believed he was among the last. The Third Concerto served the same purpose as the Second in this way: he "spoke directly to the Russian soul." The concerto soon became more popular in the United States than the Second Concerto, partially due to the fact that Rachmaninoff wrote the Third specifically for his American tour.

Vladimir Horowitz's 1930 studio recording of the concerto brought immense popularity to the piece around the world. In 1927, Horowitz met with Rachmaninoff in New York, where he performed the piece for him. By receiving feedback from the composer, Horowitz's interpretation of the concerto "most closely resembled Rachmaninoff's performance in its finely chiseled, almost steely delivery." Ruby Cheng writes, "With these expansions of musical expression and pianism, Horowitz brought the Third Concerto into a prominence that broke through any listener resistance." Horowitz later said "Without false modesty, I brought this concerto to light. I brought it to life, and everywhere!"

=== Comparison to Second Piano Concerto and legacy ===
Russian critic Grigory Prokofiev wrote "The new concerto mirrored the best sides of [Rachmaninoff's] creative power – sincerity, simplicity and clarity of musical thought." According to Varazdat Khachatryan, the Third Concerto was more piano-centric than Rachmaninoff's previous concertos, presenting the solo pianist as the main attraction, rather than the ensemble as a whole. Much of the structure of the Third Concerto echoes that of the Second, and further develops Rachmaninoff's writing style. The piece is far more structurally complex, however; advanced polyrhythms and texture feature throughout. Boris Asafiev writes that the Third Concerto departs from the "naive romantic features" seen in his earlier compositions, namely the Second Concerto. In addition, the three movements of the Third Concerto, in terms of motives and theme, resemble the cyclic form of the classical symphony, unlike his Second.

It is generally agreed that the melodic density and complexity found in the concerto, namely the ossia cadenza of the first movement, is among the most challenging in all of Rachmaninoff's works. The composition is seen by many as the pinnacle of Rachmaninoff's career as a composer.

== Instrumentation ==
The concerto is scored for piano and orchestra.

Woodwinds

2 flutes
2 oboes
2 clarinets
2 bassoons

Brass

4 horns in F
2 trumpets
3 trombones (2 tenor, 1 bass)
1 tuba

Percussion:

timpani

bass drum
snare drum
cymbals

Strings:

1st violins
2nd violins
violas
cellos
double basses

== Structure ==
External audio
- Vladimir Ashkenazy, London Symphony Orchestra, André Previn
- I. Allegro ma non tanto
- II. Intermezzo (Adagio)
- III. Finale (Alla breve)

The work follows the form of a standard piano concerto, constructed into three movements. The end of the second movement leads directly into the third without interruption.

=== I. Allegro ma non tanto ===
The first movement is in sonata-allegro form. The piece revolves around a diatonic melody which Rachmaninoff claimed "wrote itself". The theme soon develops into complex and busy pianistic figuration.

The second theme opens with quiet exchanges between the orchestra and the piano before fully diving into the second theme in B♭ major. The first part of the first theme is restated before the movement is pulled into a loud development section in C minor which opens with toccata-like quavers in the piano and reaches a loud chordal section. The whole development exhibits features similar to a canon, such as an eighth note passage in the piano in which the left hand and the right hand play overlapping figures. The movement reaches a number of ferocious climaxes, especially in the cadenza.

Portion of the original cadenza (ossia)

Rachmaninoff wrote two versions of this cadenza: the chordal original, which is commonly notated as the ossia, and a second one with a lighter, toccata-like style. Both cadenzas have a march-like statement of the main theme (the first theme in the recapitulation) which leads into a quiet solo section where the flute, oboe, clarinet and horn individually restate the transitional motifs between the two themes of the exposition, accompanied by delicate arpeggios in the piano. The cadenza then ends quietly, but the piano alone continues and plays the recapitulation's second theme in E♭ major before leading to the coda, where the first theme is restated by the piano, with the orchestra accompanying, soon closing with a quiet, rippling outro reminiscent of the second theme.

=== II. Intermezzo ===
The second movement is constructed around a theme and variations, in an ABACA form, while shifting around various home keys. The theme and first two variations are played by the orchestra alone. The piano then plays several variations with and without the orchestra.

After the first theme development and recapitulation of the second theme, the main melody from the first movement reappears, before the movement is closed by the orchestra in a manner similar to the introduction. The piano ends the movement with a short, violent "cadenza-esque" passage which moves into the last movement without pause. Many melodic thoughts of this movement allude to Rachmaninoff's second piano concerto, third movement, noticeably the Russian-like E♭ major melody.

The movement ends with tutti chords leading into the 3rd movement attacca.

=== III. Finale ===
The third movement is in a modified sonata-allegro form, and is quick and vigorous.

The ending four-note figure in the solo piano part of the finale

The movement contains variations on many of the themes that are used in the first movement, which unites the concerto cyclically. However, after the first and second themes it diverges from the regular sonata-allegro form. There is no conventional development; that segment is replaced by a lengthy digression in E♭ major, which leads to the two themes from the first movement. After the digression, the movement recapitulation returns to the original themes, building up to a toccata climax somewhat similar but lighter than the first movement's ossia cadenza and accompanied by the orchestra. The movement concludes with a triumphant and passionate second theme melody in D major. The piece ends with the same four-note rhythm – claimed by some to be the composer's musical signature – as it is used in both the composer's second concerto and second symphony.

Rachmaninoff, under pressure, and hoping to make his work more popular, authorized several cuts in the score, to be made at the performer's discretion. These cuts, particularly in the second and third movements, were commonly taken in performance and recordings during the initial decades following the concerto's publication. More recently, it has become commonplace to perform the concerto without cuts. A typical performance of the complete concerto has a duration of about forty minutes.

== In popular culture ==
The concerto plays the role of a leitmotif in the 1996 film Shine, based on the life of pianist David Helfgott.

== Sources ==
- Bertensson, Sergei; Leyda, Jay (2001). Sergei Rachmaninoff – A Lifetime in Music (Paperback ed.). New York: New York University Press. ISBN 978-0-253-21421-8.
- O'Connell, Charles (1941) [1935]. The Victor Book of the Symphony (Revised ed.). New York: Simon and Schuster.
