= Suburbis =

- by Federico Mompou
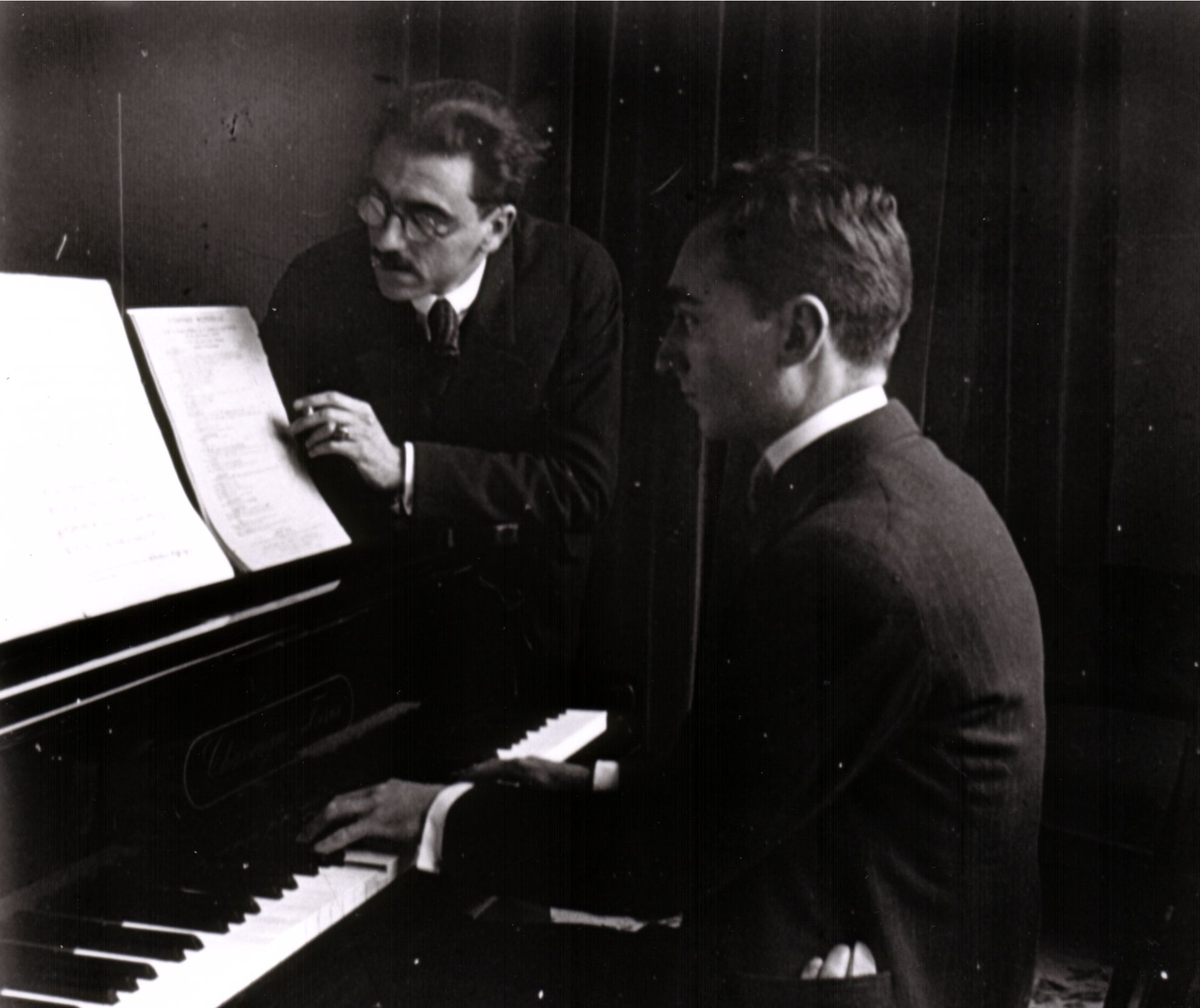
- Josep and Frederic Mompou at their family home, 1915
- Composed: 1916–17
- Published: 1922: Paris
- Publisher: Éditions Maurice Senart
- Duration: 13 minutes approx.
- Movements: Five
- Scoring: Piano

Suburbis (from Catalan, "Suburbs") is a composition for solo piano by Catalan composer Federico Mompou.

== Background ==
Suburbis was written in Barcelona, after he fled Paris following the start of World War I in 1914. It was composed throughout a biennial period: Gitanes I, La cegueta, and L'home de l'aristó were all composed in 1916, while El carrer, el guitarrista i el vell cavall and Gitanes II were finished in 1917. Heavily inspired by the barris of Barcelona, Mompou described the piece as follows:

They are the suburbs, the neighborhoods of the city ends. This idea belongs, like my Children's Scenes, to the time of my great walks on the outskirts of Barcelona. Days of sun and rain, cold or hot days, in the morning or afternoon.

— Federico Mompou

The titles reflect Mompou's intention of portraying his immediate surroundings. The first piece portrays a popular barri of the city in the evening, when the workers leave the factories, and a guitarist plays a waltz. At the end, the gait of an old horse limping is presented. In the case of the gitanes, he specified that he was not referring to the Lisztian Hungarian type, but the Spanish gitano community, which he presents in a positive light, as opposed to the "vulgar Hungarian tziganes that are running through these worlds." In the case of the last piece, L'home de l'aristó, Mompou attempts to present a scene where a man with a long white beard plays the ariston, a type of handgrip organ with bellows created in 1877 by Paul Ehrlich that became very popular in Europe in the early 1900s.

Each piece in the set was dedicated to a different person: El carrer, el guitarrista i el vell cavall was dedicated to the composer's mother, Josefina Dencausse; Gitanes I was dedicated to composer Robert Gerhard; Gitanes II was dedicated to his brother, renowned painter Josep Mompou; La cegueta was dedicated to critic Adolfo Salazar; and the last piece, L'home de l'aristó, was dedicated to Pilar Graell. It is unknown whether this compositions was officially premiered before it was published by Éditions Maurice Senart in Paris in 1922. It is nowadays republished by Éditions Salabert since the former's acquisition in 1941. In the published version of the score, the composer insisted that the work should be advertised with both French and Catalan titles. Composer and arranger Manuel Rosenthal made an orchestration of Suburbis in 1936, which was premiered by Magda Tagliaferro.

== Structure ==
This composition is scored for solo piano and has a total duration of around 13 minutes. The movement list is as follows:

1. El carrer, el guitarrista i el vell cavall (The Street, the Guitarist, and the Old Horse). Vite
2. Gitanes I (Gypsies I)
3. Gitanes II (Gypsies II). Dans un rythme inquiet
4. La cegueta (The Little Blind Girl)
5. L'home de l'aristó (The Man Playing the Ariston)

As was usual in many other compositions by Mompou, very fer bar lines and no end lines are present in the score. Almost no pieces have a key signature (except for La cegueta) and time signatures are present only for general guidance, but not for strict measurement. Accidentals for each note are present on every instance the note is played.
