= Scènes d'enfants =

- by Federico Mompou
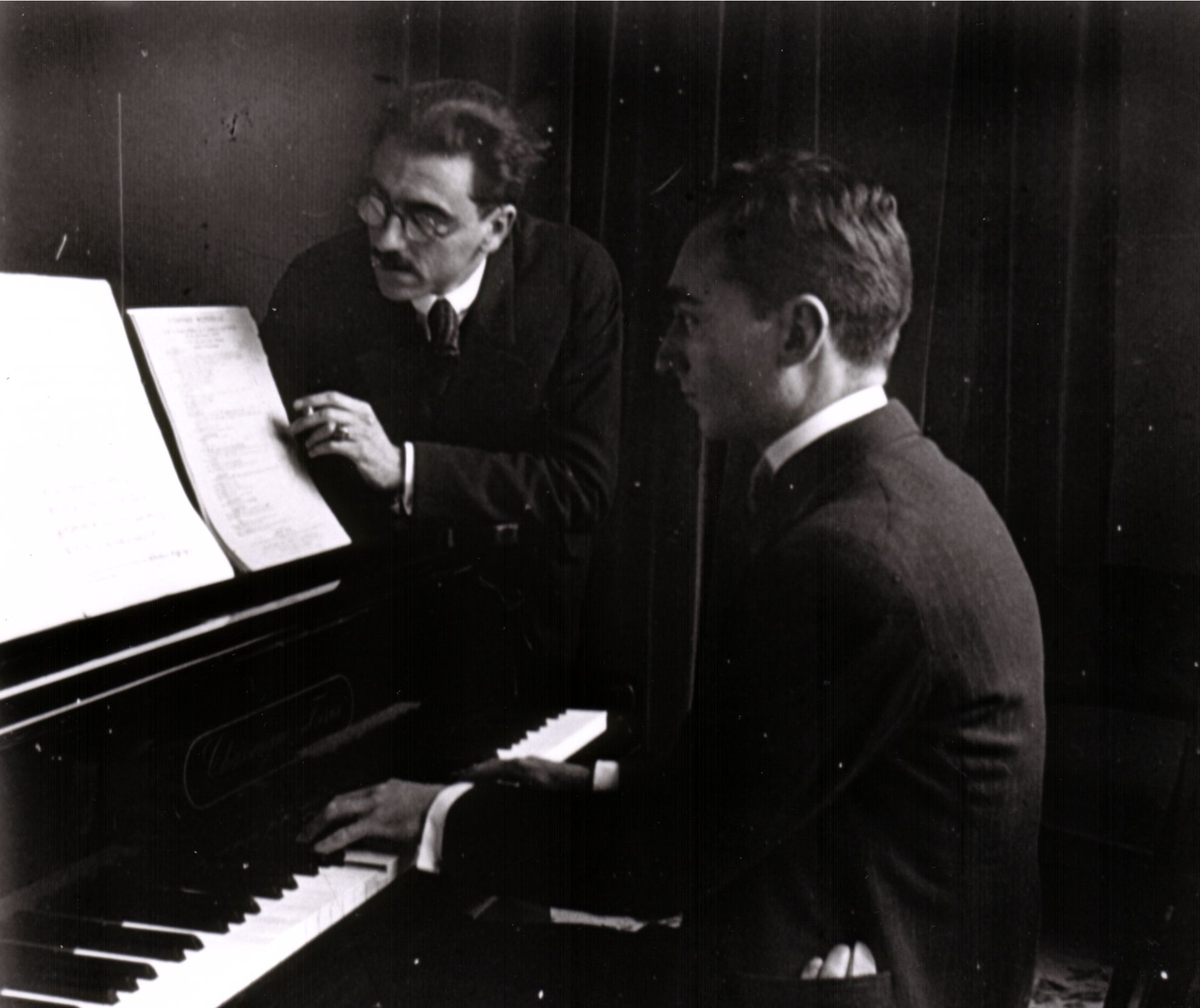
- Josep and Frederic Mompou at their family home, 1915
- Year: 1918
- Dedication: Manuel Blancafort
- Performed: 1921 – Paris
- Published: 1921 – Paris
- Publisher: Éditions Maurice Senart
- Duration: 9 minutes approx
- Movements: 5
- Scoring: Piano

Scènes d'enfants (from French: Scenes of Children or Scenes of Childhood) is a short suite for piano by Catalan composer Federico Mompou. Finished in 1918, it features Jeunes filles au jardin, arguably one of Mompou's best-known pieces.

== Background ==
This suite was written during Mompou's years after World War I forced him to move from Paris to Barcelona in 1914. Mompou wrote three "jeux" (games) in 1915. It was years later that he decided to append an opening piece and an ending, and finished it in 1918. The Scènes were dedicated to fellow composer and member of grup dels vuit Manuel Blancafort. Mompou was able to travel again to Paris in 1921, after the war was over.

Scènes d'enfants, along with many other compositions written during this period, were premiered on April 15, 1921, at Paris's Erard Hall. The concert was a recital given by Ferdinand Motte-Lacroix, a long-time champion of Mompou's music, in Paris. It was a huge success and established Mompou as a reputable composer and a public figure in the high Parisian society. The suite was first published by Éditions Maurice Senart, in Paris in 1921, and is now published by Éditions Salabert.

== Structure ==
The suite consists of five short pieces scored for piano and with a total duration of around 9 minutes. The movement list is as follows:

Structure of Mompou's Scènes d'enfants
Piece No.	Title		English		Tempo marking
I	Cris dans la rue		Cries in the Street		Gai – Très vif – Calme
II	Jeux sur la plage	Jeu 1	Games on the beach	Game 1	Vif – Rythmé
III	Jeux sur la plage	Jeu 2	Games on the beach	Game 2	Vif
IV	Jeux sur la plage	Jeu 3	Games on the beach	Game 3	Vif – Lent – Vif
V	Jeunes filles au jardin		Young Girls in the Garden		Calme – Vif – Calme – Lentement – Calme – Vif

Both the opening and the closing pieces are based on the famous Catalan folk melody La filla del marxant (The Merchant's Daughter), which is used as a cyclical element in this set. As was customary in other Mompou works, bar division is unclear in the score, as most bar lines only affect one of the staves for a general yet fuzzy sense of rhythm. None of the pieces have key signatures, even though pieces are largely tonal. Only some pieces have time signatures.

The suite begins with Cris dans la rue, which is in C major and 3/4. Parallel intervals are used very frequently, especially in the outer movements. After an introduction and an initial theme, the folk song La filla del marxant is first used, with a reprise of the introduction that closes the piece. This movement is followed by Jeu 1, which is in Aeolian mode, generally in A minor, and 3/4. It begins with a "cri" (shout), a dissonant set of chords played on the piano that are meant to depict the boisterous laughter of children. The next movement is Jeu 2, which is, again, in Aeolian mode, generally in G-sharp minor, and 6/8. The "cri" in this movement is represented by an augmented fourth interval. The fourth movement, Jeu 3, is in E minor and in 3/8 time. The "cri" in this case is meant to portray a "whistle". The last movement, Jeunes filles au jardin, is in E major, and in a changing tempo. The Catalan folk tune is presented in parallel perfect fourths.

== Recordings ==
Amongst the first recordings of the set was Mompou's own recording of Jeunes filles au jardin, recorded at Abbey Road Studio No. 1, in London. The recording, taken on February 10, 1950, was later released by EMI and re-released by EMI Classics. The following is a list of complete recordings of Scènes d'enfants:

Recordings of Mompou's Scènes d'enfants
Piano	Date of recording	Place of recording	Label
Federico Mompou	1974	Casino de l'Aliança del Poblenou, Barcelona, Spain	Ensayo
Jordi Masó	September 1997	Auditori Enric Granados, Lleida, Spain	Naxos

== Reception ==
Scènes d'enfants was an immediate success and its last movement, Jeunes filles au jardin, became one of Mompou's best-known songs internationally. At the premiere, critic Emile Vuillermoz, who specialized in Debussy and Ravel, wrote on Le temps of Mompou: "The only disciple and successor to the composer of La mer [...] is surely the young Spaniard Frederic Mompou, who, without ever having known Debussy, has understood and absorbed the essence of his teaching."

== Arrangements ==
A number of other musicians have made partial or complete arrangements of Scènes d'enfants. Joseph Szigeti arranged Jeunes filles au jardin for violin and piano in 1937, published in New York City by Carl Fischer. Mompou's friend and fellow musician Alexander Tansman made an orchestration of all pieces in the set (except for Jeu 2) in 1936. The set was also turned into a ballet by John Lanchbery. The ballet, entitled House of Birds, premiered on May 26, 1955.
