= Fantaisie-Impromptu =

Piano composition by Frédéric Chopin

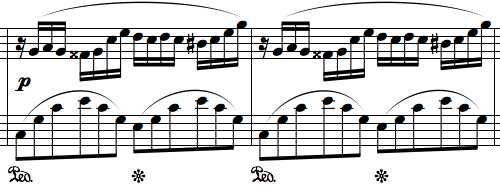
Main Theme of the Fantaisie-Impromptu

Frédéric Chopin's Fantaisie-Impromptu (Polish: Fantazja-Impromptu) in C♯ minor, Op. posth. 66, WN 46 is a solo piano composition. It was composed in 1834 and published posthumously in 1855 despite Chopin's instruction that none of his unpublished manuscripts be published. The Fantaisie-Impromptu is one of Chopin's most frequently performed and popular compositions.

== History ==
The Fantaisie-Impromptu was written in 1834, as were the Four Mazurkas (Op. 17) and the Grande valse brillante in E♭ major (Op. 18), but unlike these other works, Chopin never published the Fantaisie-Impromptu. Instead, Julian Fontana published it posthumously, along with the waltzes Opp. 69 and 70. It is unknown why Chopin did not release the Fantaisie-Impromptu. James Huneker called parts of it "mawkish" and "without nobility". Ernst Oster conducted a technical examination of the piece that hints at similarities between the Fantaisie-Impromptu and Ludwig van Beethoven's "Moonlight" Sonata (Quasi una fantasia), which he cites as the reason for Chopin's reluctance to publish the piece. It is also recognized that it resembles the Impromptu in E♭ major, Op. 89, by Ignaz Moscheles and published in 1834, the same year Chopin wrote the Fantaisie-Impromptu.

The mystery may have been solved in 1960 when pianist Arthur Rubinstein acquired the "Album of the Baroness d'Este", which had been sold at auction in Paris. The album contained a manuscript of the Fantaisie-Impromptu in Chopin's own hand, dated 1835, stating on the title page in French "Composed for the Baroness d'Este by Frédéric Chopin". The facts that its authenticity was "guaranteed by the French authorities" and that it shows "a delicate care for detail" and "many improvements in harmony and style" in comparison to the previously published version Rubinstein considered proof that it is the finished work. In his preface to the "Rubinstein Edition", published by G. Schirmer, Inc. in 1962, he surmises that the words "Composed for" in place of a dedication imply that Chopin received a paid commission for the work, so he had actually sold it to the Baroness.

== Form ==
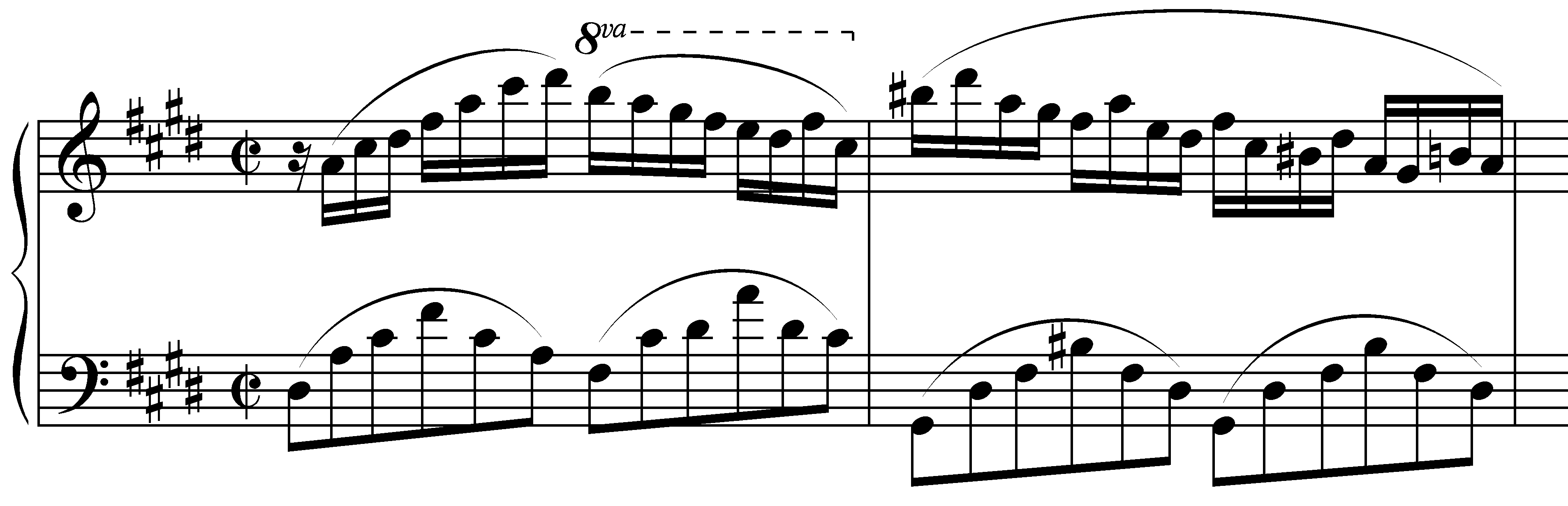
Melodic fragment (introduced in measures 7-8), Chopin's Fantaisie-Impromptu

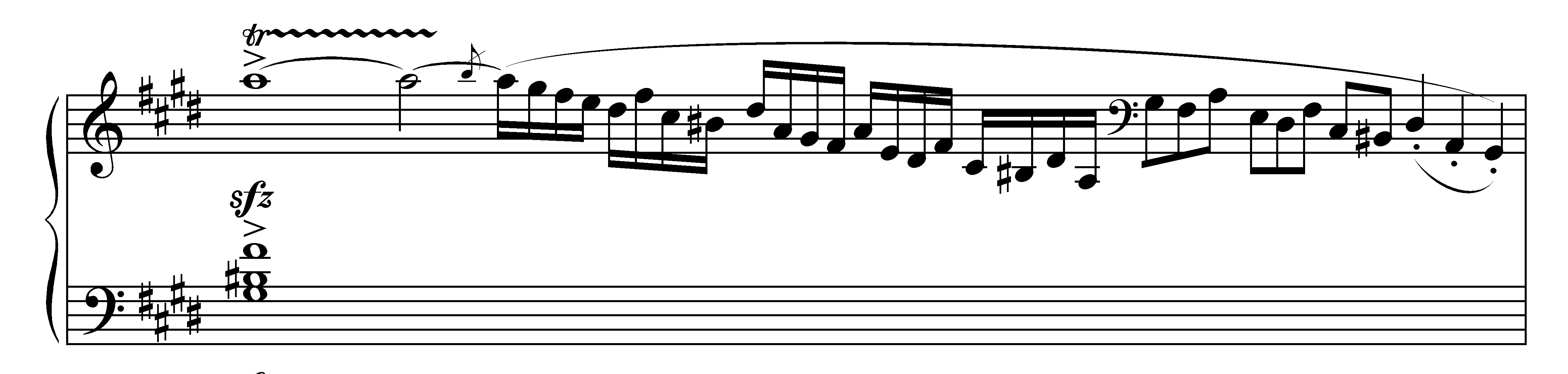
Cadenza (measure 188), Beethoven's Piano Sonata No. 14, third movement

Oster observes that the Fantaisie-Impromptu draws many of its harmonic and tonal elements from Beethoven's Moonlight Sonata, also in C♯ minor, especially the third movement. Two measures after the melody sets in, an abrupt run features the same notes, only one octave higher, as the cadenza in the sonata's third movement (Presto agitato). The climax on a ^{6}_{4} chord is similar in both pieces. Additionally, the Fantaisie-Impromptu's middle part and the second movement of the Moonlight Sonata are in D♭ major. The first and third movements are in C♯ minor.

For those and other reasons, Oster writes, "Chopin understood Beethoven to a degree that no one who has written on the C♯ minor Sonata or the Fantaisie-Impromptu has ever understood him. ... The Fantaisie-Impromptu is perhaps the only instance where one genius discloses to us—if only by means of a composition of his own—what he actually hears in the work of another genius."

The piece uses many cross-rhythms (the right hand plays sixteenth notes against the left hand playing triplets) and a ceaselessly moving note figuration, and is in cut time (2/2). The opening tempo is marked allegro agitato. The tempo changes to largo and later moderato cantabile when the key changes to D♭ major, the enharmonic equivalent of C♯ major, that is, the parallel major of C♯ minor.

The piece then changes to presto (although some versions of the score incorporate a coda, meaning that the original tempo of allegro agitato is repeated) where it returns to C♯ minor. It concludes with an ambiguous fantasy-like ending, with the left hand replaying the first few notes of the moderato section theme while the right continues playing sixteenth notes (semiquavers). The piece resolves and gently ends on a rolled C♯ major chord (a Picardy third).

== Legacy ==
Fantaisie-Impromptu, Op. 66
Performed by Martha Goldstein on an 1851 Erard piano

Fantaisie-Impromptu, Op. 66
MIDI rendition by Bernd Krüger

The melody of the Fantaisie-Impromptu's middle section was used in the popular Vaudeville song "I'm Always Chasing Rainbows". That theme is quoted in Variation 10 of Federico Mompou's Variations on a Theme of Chopin, which is otherwise based on Chopin's Prelude No. 7 in A major. George Crumb's Makrokosmos, Volume 1: 11. Dream Images (Love-Death Music) (Gemini) includes three quotations from the Fantaisie-Impromptu's middle section.

== See also ==
- Impromptu No. 1 in A-flat major (Chopin)
- Fantaisie in F minor (Chopin)
