= Frank Marshall (pianist) =

Spanish-Catalan pianist and pedagogue

Frank Marshall King (November 28, 1883 – May 29, 1959) was a Spanish pianist and pedagogue.

== Biography ==
Marshall was born in Mataró, Catalonia, Spain to parents of English heritage. He attended the Conservatori Superior de Música del Liceu and then began studying with Enrique Granados. Marshall and Granados became close musical associates, and Marshall became Granados's teaching assistant at the latter's academy.

Meanwhile, he offered several concerts and recitals throughout Europe, where he met and became a close friend of renown pianists, such as Busoni, von Sauer, Cortot, and especially Artur Rubinstein

When Granados died in 1916, Marshall became its director; he remained director until his death in 1959, and the institute's name was eventually changed to Académia Frank Marshall. Its administrators and faculty included Alicia de Larrocha, Mercedes Roldós Freixes, and Rosa Sabater. Among his pupils at the school was the composer Vicente Asencio. He published two pedagogic works, Estudio práctico sobre los pedales del piano (Madrid, 1919) and La sonoridad del piano, which attempted to notate piano pedaling more precisely.

Marshall's influence as a pianist and teacher impacted Catalan piano playing heavily; his approaches to pedaling and voicing helped refine the distinctive style of piano playing from the region. No. 3 of Federico Mompou's Cançons i danses was dedicated to him. His students included Alicia de Larrocha, Mercedes Roldós Freixes, Rosa Sabater, and the Catalan pianist Albert Attenelle, who premiered Federico Mompou's Variations on a Theme of Chopin.

Marshall died in Barcelona in 1959, aged 75.
