= Variations on a Theme of Chopin =

Variations on a Theme of Chopin may refer to:

- Variations on a Theme of Chopin (Rachmaninoff)
- Variations on a Theme of Chopin (Mompou)
- Variations on a Theme of Chopin, by Roger Smalley
- Zehn Variationen über ein Präludium von Chopin, by Ferruccio Busoni
