= Ataúlfo Argenta =

Spanish conductor and pianist (1913–1958)

- Born: Ataúlfo Exuperio Martín de Argenta Maza; 19 November 1913; Castro Urdiales, Cantabria, Spain
- Died: 21 January 1958 (aged 44); Los Molinos, Madrid, Spain
- Occupation: orchestral conductor
- Years active: 1943–1958
- Known for: Spanish and French orchestral works, zarzuela

Ataúlfo Exuperio Martín de Argenta Maza (19 November 1913 – 21 January 1958) was a Spanish conductor and pianist.

== Biography ==
Argenta was born in Castro Urdiales, a coastal town in Cantabria, where his father was a railroad stationmaster. After his family moved to Madrid in 1925, he enrolled in the Madrid Royal Conservatory, studying under Manuel Fernández Alberdi.

Argenta began to conduct the Spanish National Orchestra (SNO, Orquesta Nacional de España) more often. In January 1946, his radio contract was not renewed. In 1946, the SNO had begun a search for a replacement for Bartolomé Pérez Casas, the aging conductor of the SNO. The candidates included Franz von Hoesslin, and Argenta renewed his acquaintance with von Hoesslin, who later died in a plane crash. Argenta later became the SNO's assistant conductor, and in November 1946, the SNO's second conductor. On 2 January 1947, he was named joint director of the SNO, and conducted 80 concerts with the orchestra in one year.

In 1950, Argenta and Juana had their fifth and last surviving child, another girl. They settled in Los Molinos. In November 1950, Argenta conducted the Paris Conservatory Orchestra for the first time and continued to direct them regularly until his death. Also in 1950, Argenta began to conduct a series of recordings of zarzuelas for the Alhambra record label. He eventually made over 50 zarzuela recordings, and recordings of zarzuela selections. He conducted the soundtrack for the film La cancion de Malibran, which premiered in October 1951.

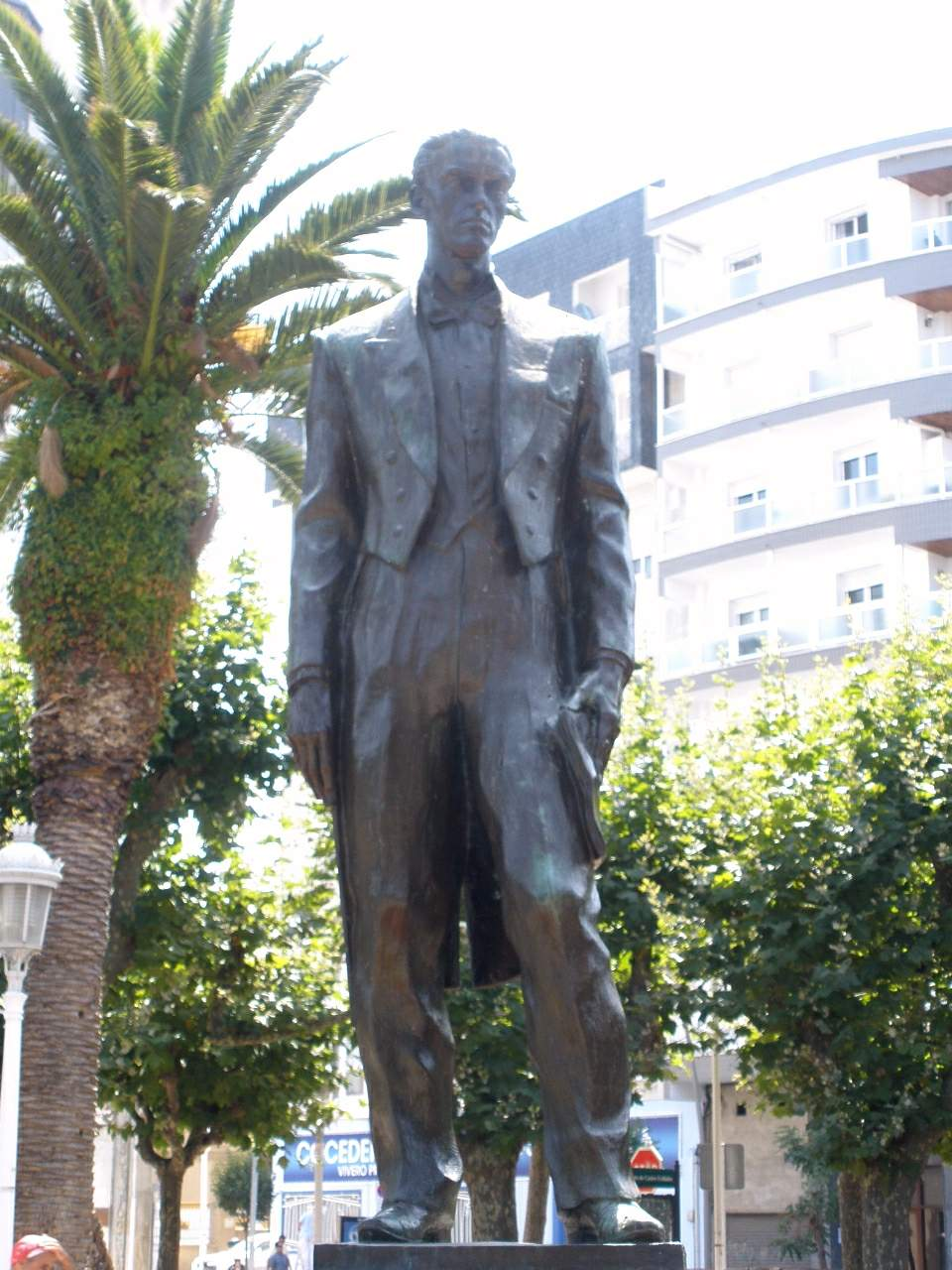
Statue in Castro Urdiales

On 15 February 1954, an article written by Argenta was published in the Madrid arts magazine Ateneo. It strongly criticized the Spanish musical scene under Generalissimo Franco, including criticism of Joaquín Rodrigo. Rodrigo himself responded in print. The resulting controversy forced Argenta to apologize for the article, and caused a rupture in Argenta's relationship with Rodrigo. He made his first appearance with the Orchestre de la Suisse Romande (OSR) in 1954, which led to several later commercial recordings for Decca.

During the night of 21 January 1958, he died of accidental carbon monoxide poisoning at Los Molinos, Madrid.

In January 2008, the 50th anniversary of Argenta's death was commemorated in Spain with concerts, exhibitions and conferences, as well as the publication of two biographies.

== Recordings ==
The bulk of Argenta's recorded legacy consists of recordings of over 50 zarzuelas with Alhambra (Spanish Columbia). He also was to record perhaps as many as 80 classical pieces, many for Decca, such as Hector Berlioz's Symphonie fantastique with the Paris Conservatoire Orchestra. For example, his famous stereophonic demonstration record España!, with the London Symphony Orchestra, made at Kingsway Hall in January 1957, featured Spanish-themed music by mostly non-Spanish composers. Other recordings include Manuel de Falla's El amor brujo with Ana María Iriarte, Joaquín Rodrigo's Concierto de Aranjuez with Narciso Yepes, Falla's Nights in the Gardens of Spain with Gonzalo Soriano, and more obscurely, his recordings of Francisco Escudero and Maurice Ohana. RTVE-Musica released a four CD set in 1997 of radio broadcasts featuring Argenta accompanying violinist Arthur Grumiaux in sonatas of Beethoven and Brahms, leading Yehudi Menuhin in the latter's violin concerto (SNO) and Martin Imaz in Francisco Escudero's piano concerto (BRSO), as well as orchestral works of Beethoven (SNO), and with the Orchestre de la Suisse Romande, works of de Falla, Tchaikovsky, Smetana, and Strauss.
