= Cançons i danses =

Compositions by Federico Mompou

Cançons i danses (sing. Cançó i dansa - Catalan; English: Songs and Dances; each originally published singly under the Spanish title Canción y Danza ) is the title of a collection of 15 pieces by Federico Mompou, written between 1918 and 1972. All were written for the piano, except No. 13 for guitar, and No. 15 for organ.

== Pieces ==
Each piece consists of an introductory slow Cançó, followed by a more animated Dansa in a related key but not necessarily in the same time signature. They are mostly based on existing Catalan folk tunes, although some of them are original works. Each takes between 3 and 5 minutes to play.

The Cançons i danses were not written as a set, but as discrete pieces over a 55-year span. Cançó i dansa No. 1 is one of Mompou's best known works, and has been arranged for various combinations of instruments. No. 6 is also very well known.

Many of them have been recorded individually, by pianists such as Arthur Rubinstein, Arturo Benedetti Michelangeli, Stephen Hough, Stanislas Niedzielski, Artur Pizarro, Neil Galanter and others. The complete collection has been recorded by the composer himself, Alicia de Larrocha, Martin Jones, Jordi Masó, Gustavo Romero, and Peter Fletcher (in his own arrangements for guitar).

== List of Cançons i danses ==
No.	Cançó	Dansa	Comments
1	Quasi moderato; F♯ major; based on La hija de Crimson (La Filla del Carmesi)	Allegro non troppo; F♯ minor – F♯ major; based on Dansa de Castelltercol (or Castelltersol)	Written without a key signature
2	Lento; G minor; based on Dotze cavallers (Senyora Isabel)	Molt amable; G major; based on Galop de cortesia	
3	Modéré; 3; based on El Noi de la Mare	Sardana-temps de marche; 6/8; original, salvaged from an unfinished string quartet	dedicated to Frank Marshall; contains no bar lines
4	Moderat; 3/4; 1 sharp; based on A la vora de la mar (El Mariner)	Viv; 1 sharp; based on Ball del Ciri	ded. Madame la Princesse de Bassiano
5	Lento litúrgico; C♯ minor; 8/4	Senza rigore -- Ritmado; E major; 6/4	ded. Maria Canals; an original work, conceived in 1942 during a dream
6	Cantabile espressivo; E♭ minor; 4	Ritmado; E♭ minor – B♭ major; 6/8	ded. Arthur Rubinstein; an original work; uses rhythms influenced by Cuban, Argentinian and Brazilian cultures. The Cançó was a favorite encore of Arturo Benedetti Michelangeli.
7	Lento; A major; 6/8; based on Muntanyes regalades	Danza; A major; 3/4; based on L'Hereu Riera	
8	Moderato cantabile con sentimento; G minor; 3/4; based on El testament d'Amèlia	Danza; G major; 3/4; based on La filadora	The tune of the Cançó is known in a number of countries, as far away as Sweden
9	Cantabile espressivo; E♭ major; 2/3; based on Rossinyol que vas a França	Allegro; E♭ major; 3/4	ded. Gonzalo Soriano
10	Larghetto molto cantabile; 4	Amabile; 3/4	1953, ded. La Infanta Dona Maria Cristina de Borbon-Battenberg; marked Sobre dos Cantigos del Rey Alfonso X; also transcribed for guitar by the composer
11	Lent et majestueux - Allegro moderato; D minor; 2, leading to 6/8; based on Tema de la "Patum" de Berga	Grazioso; D major; 4/4; based on Ball de l'Aliga i Turcs I cavallets	ded. Rafael Puyana
12	Molto cantabile; F♯ minor; 3; based on La dama d'Aragó	Danza; B minor (?); 3; based on La mala nova	ded. the memory of Léon-Paul Fargue
13	Based on El cant dels ocells	Based on El bon caçador	1972, written for guitar, for Narciso Yepes
14	Based on Petiteta l'han casada (Quan jo n’era petitet)	Based on La dansa de Castelltersol (Canco del Lladre)	
15			Written for organ

== Sources ==
- entre88teclas.es
- MOMPOU, F.: Piano Music, Vol. 1 (Maso) Naxos 8.554332
- PRODigital Records – Program notes
- Quotesque.net
- Catalan piano music Mompou Canço i dansa no. 6
