= Paisatges =

- by Federico Mompou
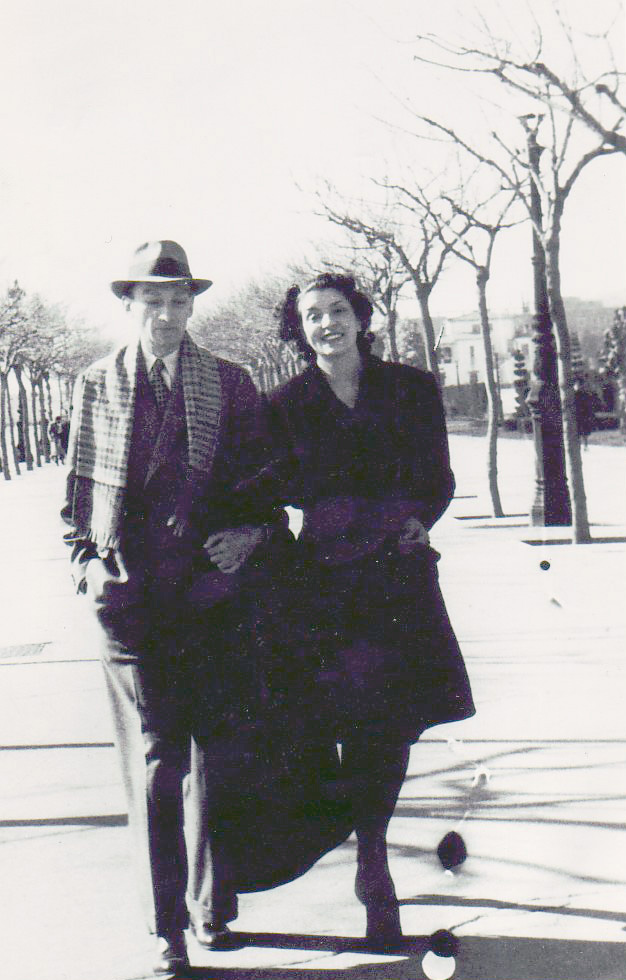
- Mompou with Carme Bravo, 1943
- Written: 1941–60
- Dedication: Carme Bravo (Book I); Antonio Iglesias (Book II)
- Published: 1957: Paris (Book I); 1962: Paris (Book II)
- Publisher: Éditions Salabert
- Duration: 13 minutes approx.
- Movements: Three
- Scoring: Piano

Paisatges (from Catalan, "Landscapes") is a composition for piano by Catalan composer Federico Mompou. Written over a period of seventeen years, it was published in 1960.

== Background ==
Paisatges was unlikely to have been devised as a suite from the beginning, since each individual movement was finished at a different year, many years apart. It was published in two books. Book I consists of La fuente y la campana (The Fountain and the Bell), officially finished in 1942, but with manuscripts dating back to December 16, 1941, and El lago (The Lake), the earliest surviving manuscript of which was finished on May 20, 1947. Book II, however, only consists of Carros de Galicia (Carts from Galicia), which was finished in 1960.

La fuente y la campana was the first piece to have been composed by Mompou after a twelve-year hiatus and after his return to Barcelona from Paris, as he decided to come back to composing following the Spanish Civil War. Written at the request of pianist Carmen Bravo, who would later become his wife, it portrays an episode "in a very romantic courtyard of Barcelona's Gothic Quarter, with fountains" where "bells of the nearby cathedral could be heard". El lago, also located in Barcelona, presents the Montjuic Park: "It is not very big and calm; on its surface we can all distinguish, and even hear, a frog jumping about". Carros de Galicia, on the other hand, was composed while Mompou was attending and teaching at a music festival in Santiago de Compostela, inspired by his feelings on an autumn afternoon when he was visiting writer Vicente Risco at his estate overlooking Castro Caldelas.

Both books were not published simultaneously. Book I, which included the two first pieces, was published by Éditions Salabert in Paris in 1957, ten years after the last piece was finished. Since Mompou wrote an additional piece to be included in the set after the first book was published, Salabert released the piece in another book, which was published in 1962. Book I was dedicated to his wife, Carme Bravo, and Book II, to Antonio Iglesias, a pianist and personal acquaintance of Mompou.

== Structure ==
This composition is cast into three movements, divided into two books. It is scored for solo piano and has an approximate duration of 13 minutes. The movement list is as follows:

- Book I
1. La fuente y la campana. Lento
2. El lago. Larghetto placido
- Book II
3. Carros de Galicia. Lento

Contrary to earlier compositions by Mompou, the composer uses bar lines and no time signature changes. Even though the movements are tonal for the most part, no key signature is used in any movements.

== Recordings ==
Mompou made several recorded performances of Paisatges. La fuente y la campana was recorded on February 10, 1950, at Abbey Road Studio No. 1 in London. The composer later recorded the complete work in 1974 at the Casino de l’Aliança del Poblenou in Barcelona; this recording formed part of an integral edition released by Ensayo.
