= Marcel Worms =

Dutch pianist

Marcel Worms (born Amsterdam, 1951) is a piano player from the Netherlands.

== Education ==
After completing secondary education at the Vossius Gymnasium, Worms started studying Biology. He became a biology teacher at the Gymnasium Felisenum until 1985. At that time he decided to go to the Conservatorium van Amsterdam; he finished the Conservatory in 1987 mainly taught by Hans Dercksen. Thereafter he specialised in 20th-century piano music and chamber music respectively with Alexandre Hrisanide and Hans Broekman. He also took lessons from the famous Russian pianist Yuri Egorov, and from Alicia de Larrocha.

== Blues project ==
His program "New Blues for piano", to which many well-known Dutch composers contributed with a piece, was premiered in January 1997 at the Bimhuis, a jazz centre in Amsterdam. Some 200 new blues pieces have been composed for this project including pieces from about 50 different countries around the world. From 1998 until 2012 Marcel Worms played this program in many countries.

== Federico Mompou ==
Since 2002 Marcel Worms has made three CDs with works by Spanish composer Federico Mompou. In 2007 he organised a three-day Mompou festival in Amsterdam. In 2008 he went to Barcelona to recover the unpublished works of Mompou. In 2009 he was the first pianist to perform these unpublished works of Mompou.

== Discography ==
Marcel recorded 15 solo CDs, and 11 CDs as part of a chamber group.
