= Jordi Masó =

Jordi Masó may refer to:

- Jordi Masó (pianist), Spanish classical pianist
- Jordi Masó (footballer) (born 1992), Spanish footballer
