= Mercedes Roldós Freixes =

Spanish composer and music educator

Mercedes (Mercè) Roldós Freixes (25 September 1910 – 2 February 1989) was a Spanish composer and music educator who performed professionally as a pianist during her childhood. As an adult, she taught at the Marshall Academy and served as its assistant director.

Roldós Freixes was born in Barcelona. Her mother was her first piano teacher. She later studied with Maria Colbeto, Frank Marshall, and Mas y Serracant.

Roldós Freixes was a precocious performer, appearing with the Jofre Orchestra at the Palacio de Fomento when she was eight years old in 1918. In July 1921, she received favorable press reviews from a recital in the Sala Granados. In 1923 she appeared at the Aeolian Hall, then returned to the Sala Granados to accompany the violinist Rosita García Faria in 1924. Her last public performance was in April 1927 at the Ateneo Barcelona.

In February 1929, Roldós Freixes auditioned for the Marshall Academy, where she taught and later served as the assistant director under Director Alicia de Larrocha for the rest of her life. Her students included Rosa María Kucharski, Douglas Riva, and Berta Serra.

Roldós Freixes composed Berceuse (violin and piano) and Nocturne (piano). Her correspondence with Alicia de Larrocha is archived in the Alicia de Larrocha Archives.
