= Douglas Riva =

American classical pianist

Douglas Riva is an American classical pianist.

== Biography and career ==
Douglas Riva began studying piano and flute at age nine. At age sixteen, he began his professional career as a flautist, being principal flautist of the El Paso Symphony. Later turning exclusively to the piano, Riva studied at the Juilliard School and New York University, studying with Adele Marcus and Eugene List. Receiving a grant from the Beebe Fund, Riva went to Barcelona in 1980, where he studied at the Academia Marshall with Mercedes Roldós Freixes. The Academia Marshall was founded by Enrique Granados.

Riva has performed in such prestigious venues as the White House and Carnegie Hall, as well as for radio and television programs around the world. A specialist in the music of Granados, Riva is the assistant director of the 18-volume critical edition of the Complete Works for Piano of Enrique Granados, directed by Alicia de Larrocha and published by Editorial Boileau, Barcelona, 2001, which is the first complete catalog of the composer's works for piano.

As a recording artist, Riva focuses on Spanish music, and has begun a series of the complete piano works of Granados for the Naxos label.
