= Rafael Puyana =

Rafael Antonio Lázaro Puyana Michelsen (14 October 1931 – 1 March 2013) was a Colombian harpsichordist.

Puyana was born in Bogotá in 1931, and began piano lessons at age 6 with his aunt and at age 13 made his debut at the Teatro Colón in Bogotá. When he was 16, he went to Boston to continue his piano studies at the New England Conservatory. He subsequently studied harpsichord with Wanda Landowska and musical composition with Nadia Boulanger in Paris.

Puyana made his harpsichord début in New York in 1957. In 1961, he débuted in Boston in the Peabody Mason Concert series. One reviewer was so impressed by his performance, the sub-headline read: "Without any doubt, Rafael Puyana's recital at Jordan Hall last night was by far the greatest program of harpsichord music I have ever heard". He made his London debut in 1966.

Puyana performed with Yehudi Menuhin, Leopold Stokowski and Andrés Segovia. Composers Federico Mompou and Xavier Montsalvatge dedicated compositions to him - in Mompou's case, No. 11 of his Cançons i Danses.

Puyana taught such artists as Christopher Hogwood and Elizabeth de la Porte. He also collected historical instruments such as a 3-manual harpsichord made in 1740 by H.A. Hass.

In 1984, he served on the jury of the Paloma O'Shea Santander International Piano Competition.

Puyana died in Paris on 1 March 2013, aged 81.

== Sources ==
- The Grove Concise Dictionary of Music, published by Oxford University Press, 1994.
