= Variations on a Theme of Chopin (Mompou) =

The Variations on a Theme of Chopin (also known as Variations sur un thème de Chopin) is a work for solo piano by Federico Mompou. The theme of its variations is based on the Prelude in A major, Op. 28, No. 7, by Frédéric Chopin.

It started out as a piece for cello and piano, written in collaboration between Mompou and the cellist Gaspar Cassadó. Work on this version of the piece started in 1938, but was abandoned. Mompou then published four variations for solo piano, but with the incongruous title Three Variations.

Kenneth MacMillan's ballet La Casa de los Pájaros (The House of Birds), set to orchestrations by John Lanchbery of various piano pieces by Mompou, had been premiered at Sadler's Wells in London in 1955, and was also staged at the 4th Festival de Música y Danza at Granada. Mompou was then asked by The Royal Ballet, London to write another ballet in the hope of emulating the success of La Casa de los Pájaros. For this, Mompou completed the full set of 12 variations in 1957. The latter ballet was never produced, and the music was published as Variations on a Theme of Chopin, without any reference to any balletic connections.

The work was dedicated to Mompou's friend Pedro Masaveu, a banker who had made available to Mompou his house in which to compose. The variations were premiered by the Catalan pianist Albert Attenelle in 1964 after working with the composer.

== The variations ==
- Theme. Andantino (A major)
- Variation 1. Tranquillo e molto amabile (A major)
- Variation 2. Gracioso (A major)
- Variation 3. Lento (D major, for the left hand)
- Variation 4. Espressivo (F major)
- Variation 5. Tempo di Mazurka (A major)
- Variation 6. Recitativo (G minor)
- Variation 7. Allegro leggiero (A major)
- Variation 8. Andante dolce e espressivo (F major)
- Variation 9. Valse (A major)
- Variation 10. Évocation. Cantabile molto espressivo (F sharp minor; Mompou quotes his own Cancion y Danza No. 6; in the middle section, he quotes the central theme from Chopin's Fantaisie-Impromptu, Op. 66)
- Variation 11. Lento dolce e legato (F sharp minor)
- Variation 12. Galope y Epílogo (A major).

== Arrangements ==
An orchestration was completed, but this was largely the work of the conductor Antoni Ros-Marbà.

The work has been transcribed for two guitars by William Lovelady. This has been recorded by brothers Slava and Leonard Grigoryan.

== In popular culture ==
- In the 1990 film adaption of Sakura no Sono (櫻の園, literally Cherry Blossom Garden), a recording by Mari Kumamoto is used for the soundtrack throughout the film.

== See also ==
- List of variations on a theme by another composer
