= Carme Bravo =

Catalan pianist (1919–2007)

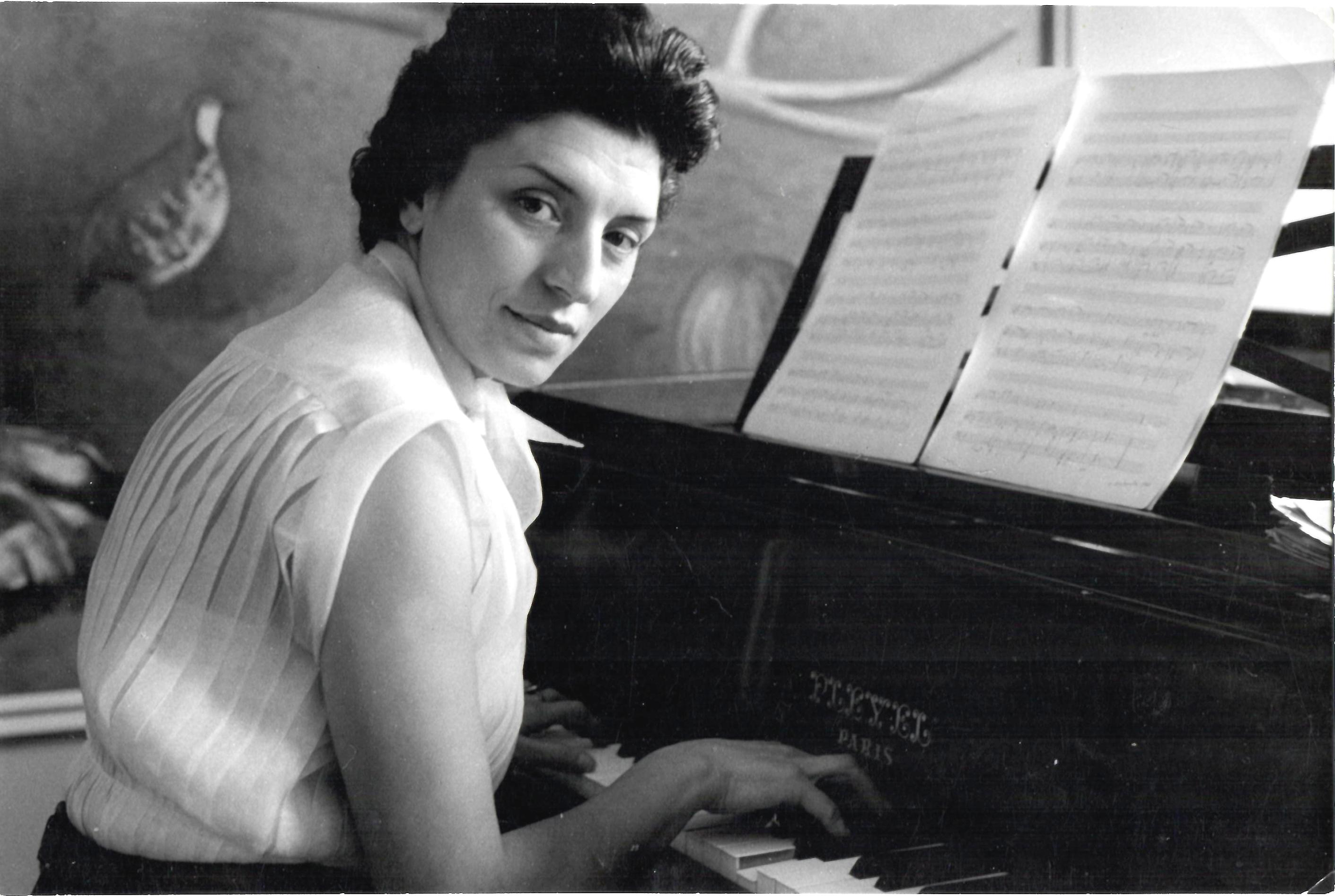
- Born: October 24, 1919; Gironella
- Died: April 29, 2007 (aged 87); Barcelona
- Education: Municipal Conservatory of Barcelona
- Occupations: Pianist, Teacher
- Partner: Frederic Mompou i Dencausse

Carme Bravo Roy (Gironella, Berguedà, October 24, 1919 - Barcelona, April 29, 2007) was a Catalan pianist. She completed her piano studies at the Municipal Conservatory of Barcelona where she received various awards and qualifications including a scholarship to study in Paris. In 1950 she moved to France where she studied under Madga Tagliaferro and Lazare Lévy.

== Biography ==
=== Early years ===
Born into an artesan family, Bravo received her first piano lessons from a neighbor. Later when her family moved to Barcelona, she took up piano and solfège at a music school. During this period she met her close friend Petri Palou, also a piano student.

=== Music career ===
She initiated her piano solo career in Barcelona with the Barcelona Symphony Orchestra, working with Eduard Toldrà who was the conductor at that time. In 1941 Bravo participated in a piano competition organized by César Mendoza Lasalle in the Coliseum theatre of Barcelona. There she met composer Federico Mompou who she would later marry in 1957. In 1950, the Barcelona city council awarded her a scholarship to travel to Paris to continue her piano studies. During her stay there she performed for the French radio station. Bravo also gave various concerts in Italy and the Netherlands, presenting classical and Spanish repertoire. Among other known professors, she received lessons from Ricard Vinyes.

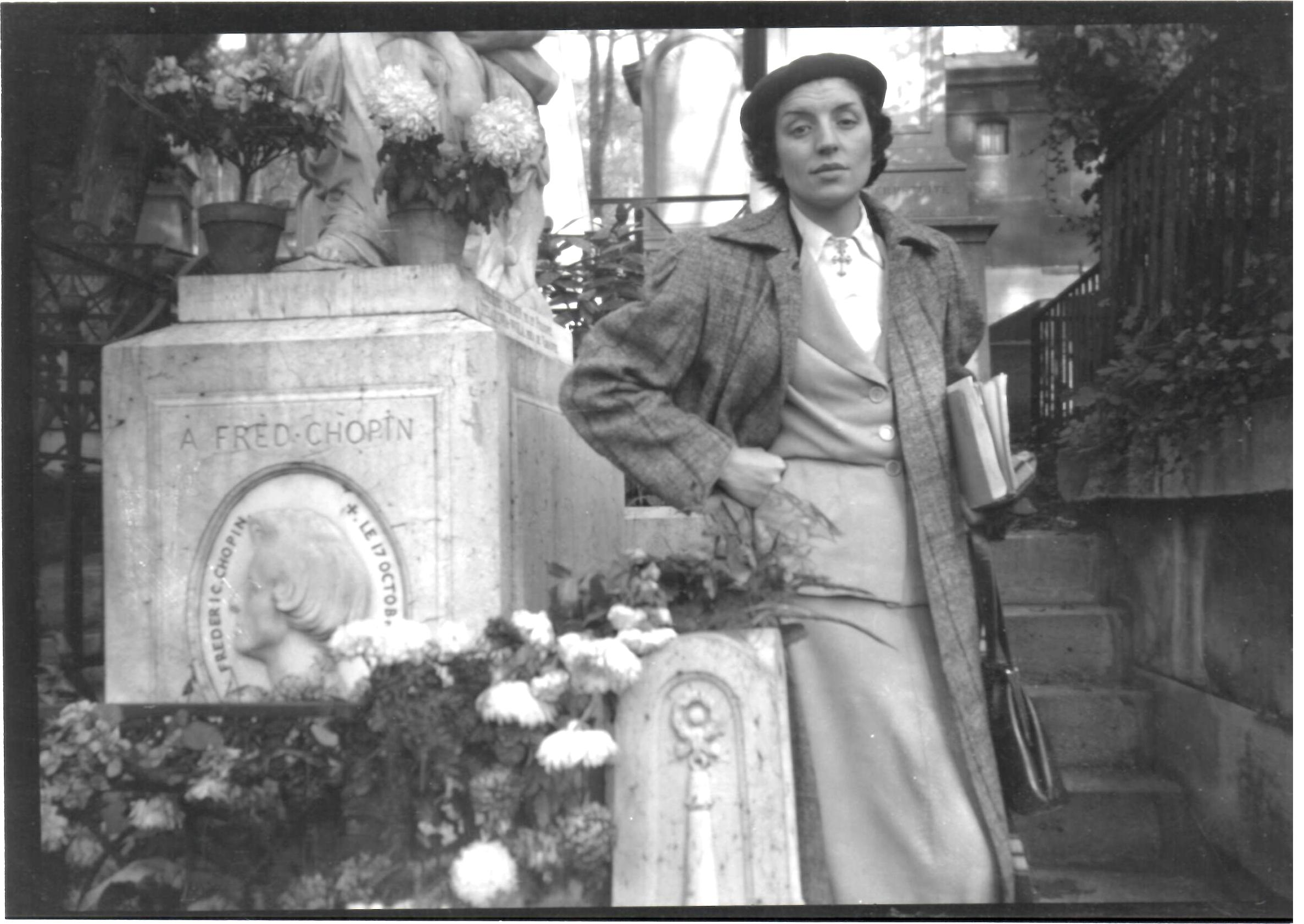
Carme Bravo next to Chopin's tomb in Paris in 1950

During her marriage she taught piano at the Municipal Conservatory of Barcelona as well as pedagogy at the Escola Universitària del Professorat. After the death of her husband, she again took up her performance career, presenting his works in countries such as Japan, the United States, and in other regions of Spain.

=== Personal life ===
Bravo began her childhood living alone with her parents in Gironella. She had older siblings who were enrolled in a boarding school, but she received her early education from her mother. It was at the Municipal Conservatory of Barcelona that she met her close friend Petri Palou.

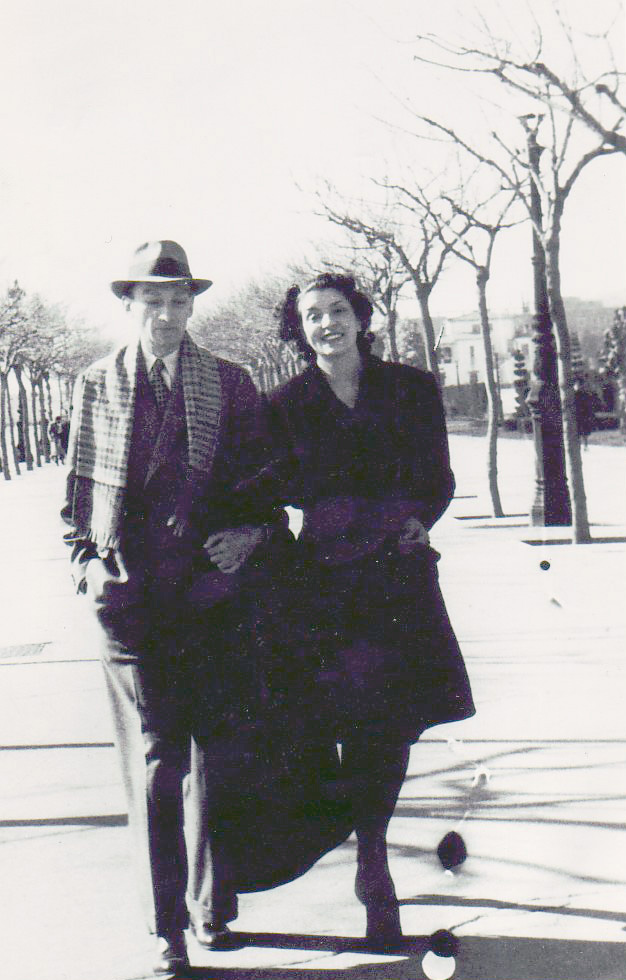
Carme Bravo and Frederic Mompou in 1943

After meeting the composer and pianist Frederic Mompou, the two developed a close relationship, meeting frequently to go for walks in Barcelona. The relationship continued for fifteen years and resulted in their marriage in 1957. Bravo also had friendships with many other known artists and poets of her time. Among others, she kept in contact with Alicia de Larrocha, Xavier Montsalvatge, Josep Janés, and Ester Nadal. Bravo and Nadal had participated together in many musical activities, and along with Pura Gómez and J. Climent i Guinart they founded the Cor Mixt Polifònic.

=== Later years ===
After the death of her husband in 1987, Bravo began giving private lessons to pianists, instructing them in the art of performing Mompou's music, as well as incorporating the composer's works in her international performances. She created a foundation dedicated to the divulgation of Mompou's works, especially among young people. Together with the Juventuts Musicals de Barcelona and Joan Millà she established the Frederic Mompou Private Foundation on the 12th of June, 2006.

She recorded two CDs published with EMI Classics and PDI.
