= Mari Kumamoto =

Japanese-born professional pianist (born 1964)

- Born: 15 October 1964 (age 62)
- Origin: Tokyo; Real Conservatorio Superior de Música de Madrid; Juilliard School of Music; Royal Academy of Music in London
- Genre: Classical
- Occupations: Pianist; Professor of Music in Piano Performance at Osaka University of Arts
- Instruments: Piano
- Website: www.marikumamoto.com

Mari Kumamoto (熊本 マリ, born October 15, 1964) is a Japanese-born professional pianist known for her recordings of Spanish and Japanese composers.

== Early life ==
Born in Tokyo, Japan, Kumamoto began piano studies at the age of five. At age ten, she moved with her family to Madrid, Spain and began studies with Joaquin Soriano at the Madrid Royal Conservatory. In 1975 she was awarded the top prize in the young pianists competition.

== Career ==
=== Studies abroad and awards ===
In 1982, Kumamoto was awarded a special scholarship to study at Juilliard School of Music under professor Sascha Gorodnitzki. In 1985, she enrolled at Royal Academy of Music in London and was awarded a recital diploma. She won many prizes including the top prize at the Newport International Piano Competition which was awarded by Diana, Princess of Wales.

=== Return to Japan ===
In 1986, Kumamoto returned to Japan and started a career focusing on the piano music of Spanish composer Federico Mompou (1893–1987). She was the first pianist to record his entire piano repertoire. She later translated Mompou's biography Música Callada.

=== Concert tours ===
In 1994, Kumamoto embarked on an international concert series performing with the Czech Philharmonic Orchestra at its New Year's Eve concert. She also performed with Josef Suk and the Suk Chamber Orchestra, which was repeated in Japan same year.

In 1996, Kumamoto held a recital in Spain, as a participant of "Japan Week”. Since then Kumamoto has given yearly solo and ensemble recitals with a special emphasis on Spanish and Latin American repertoire and Japanese composers including Hajime Okumura whose music reflects the traditional melodies of Japanese folk songs.

Her most recent concerts include a tour in Egypt with the Cairo Opera Orchestra followed by a recital tour in Jordan and Alexandria. In June 2012 she was invited to perform recitals and concerts with the Venezuela Symphony Orchestra. This was followed by concerts in Argentina with the Esteban Morgado Quartet.

== Discography ==
- 1988: "眠れる詩人の歌" Mompou Album
- 1989: "Mari Plays Mompou"
- 1990: "Mompou's Piano Music No. 2"
- 1990: "Mompou's Piano Music No. 3"
- 1991: "Mompou's Piano Music No. 4"
- 1992: "バルセロナの風~スペイン・ピアノ名曲ベスト・コレクション" Spanish Piano Selections
- 1993: Bach "Goldberg Variations"
- 1994: イタリア協奏曲 Bach Italian Concerto
- 1995: "Mompou's Best Collection"
- 1995: バッハ：ブランデンブルク協奏曲 Bach: Brandenburg Concerto
- 1997: Tango
- 1997: 忘れられた調べ Unforgotten Melodies
- 1999: Carmen (Bizet)
- 2003: Taboo~Viva, Latin Dance!
- 2004: スペインの熱い夜/熊本マリ スペイン名曲集 The Best Spanish Pieces
- 2005: マジョルカ島の恋~ショパン・ノクターン集 Chopin Nocturnes
- 2006: 静かな音楽 Mompou: Música Callada
- 2009: 熊本マリの Shall We Dance?
- 2011: 鳥の歌~愛のメッセージ Bird Song ~ Love Message
- 2012: 日本の心、日本のメロディー ~奥村一作品集 Hajime Okumura Piano Pieces
- 2013: 秘密 モンポウ・ベスト Mompou: Best Selections

== Publications ==
- 1993: ひそやかな音楽ーフェデリコ・モンポウ 生涯と作品 (Japanese translation) Biography of Federico Mompou (Japanese translation)
- 1996: 薔薇よ、語って Essays on Life as a Pianist Part 1
- 1997: 音よ、耀け―バッハからタンゴ Essays on Life as a Pianist Part 2
- 2004: ラ・ピアニスタ 太陽の門から Essays on Life as a Pianist Part 3
- 2008: 人生を幸福にしてくれるピアノの話 Essays on Li Ms. e as a Pianist Part 4

== Teaching appointment ==
Appointed in 2010, Kumamoto is currently Professor of Music in Piano Performance at Osaka University of Arts.

She is a jury member of José Iturbi International Piano Competition.
