= Gonzalo Soriano =

Spanish classical pianist

Gonzalo Soriano (March 14, 1913 – April 14, 1972) was one of Spain's most distinguished classical pianists of the twentieth century.

Born in Alicante, Soriano began studying music at an early age, but soon began to concentrate on piano. Graduating from the Royal Conservatory in Madrid in 1929, he went on to study piano and composition with Ella Eleanore Amzel in Lisbon. Back in Madrid, as a protégé of Manuel de Falla, whose work he played on numerous occasions, Soriano's talent soon began to be recognized. He enjoyed the company of Ramón Gómez de la Serna and a group of like-minded artists and writers.

The Spanish Civil War interrupted his career and it was only after the end of the Second World War that he began to acquire a reputation in Europe, impressing the public and critics alike for his versatility, technique and musical sensitivity. He began to give concerts in Europe in 1947 and made his first U.S. tour in 1954 to considerable critical and commercial success. From this tour came the first American recording containing Albéniz's Suite española (Boston Records: B302). With the same company he recorded the Variations sérieuses by Mendelssohn, Schumann's Three Romances, Op. 27 and Schubert's Sonata in A minor, Op. 164, all on a single LP (BR, B303).

In 1955 he made his first tour of the Far East and in December 1959 visited the Scandinavian countries, which included a concert given before the King of Sweden on the occasion of the award of the Nobel Prize in Medicine to Dr. Severo Ochoa. Soriano recorded with the best performers and conductors. Among others, he worked with Rafael Frühbeck de Burgos on more than one occasion, recording with him the Nights in the Gardens of Spain and Harpsichord Concerto in D major, both by Manuel de Falla (Angel Records, 36131). Two other memorable recordings of the first work were done under the direction of Ataúlfo Argenta (Alhambra, MCC 30008).

The soprano Victoria de los Angeles, an admirer of Soriano, was a collaborator for both concerts and recordings. The two performed in works written by Federico Mompou, Xavier Montsalvatge or Joaquin Turina. (20th Century Spanish Songs, Angel (S) 35775). Soriano and Montsalvatge had a particularly close relationship: Montsalvatge wrote a piece expressly for Soriano, Sonatine pour Yvette, dedicated to the Montsalvatge's daughter and premiered by Soriano (recorded by EMI / His Master's Voice, FALP 874). Other composers like Mompou and Rodolfo Halffter also wrote works for Soriano - in Mompou's case, No. 9 of Cançons i Danses was dedicated to him.

Soriano died suddenly from a stroke on 14 April 1972 at home in Madrid, with his latest recording, Granados' Twelve Dances (EMI-Odeon, J 063-10913) still in production - a work that had already won the Grand Prix du Disque de l'Académie française. Soriano left a large collection of performances and recordings, including de Falla's complete works for keyboard (His Master's Voice, 053-00731 and 063-01289). He was survived by his mother, Consuelo Simó and his partner, John Ross who, after Soriano's death, joined a religious order of Benedictine monks, remaining in retreat for 20 years before returning to his birthplace in Hawaii, where he resided in the city of Hilo until his death in 2013.
