= Preludes (Chopin) =

Piano works by Frédéric Chopin

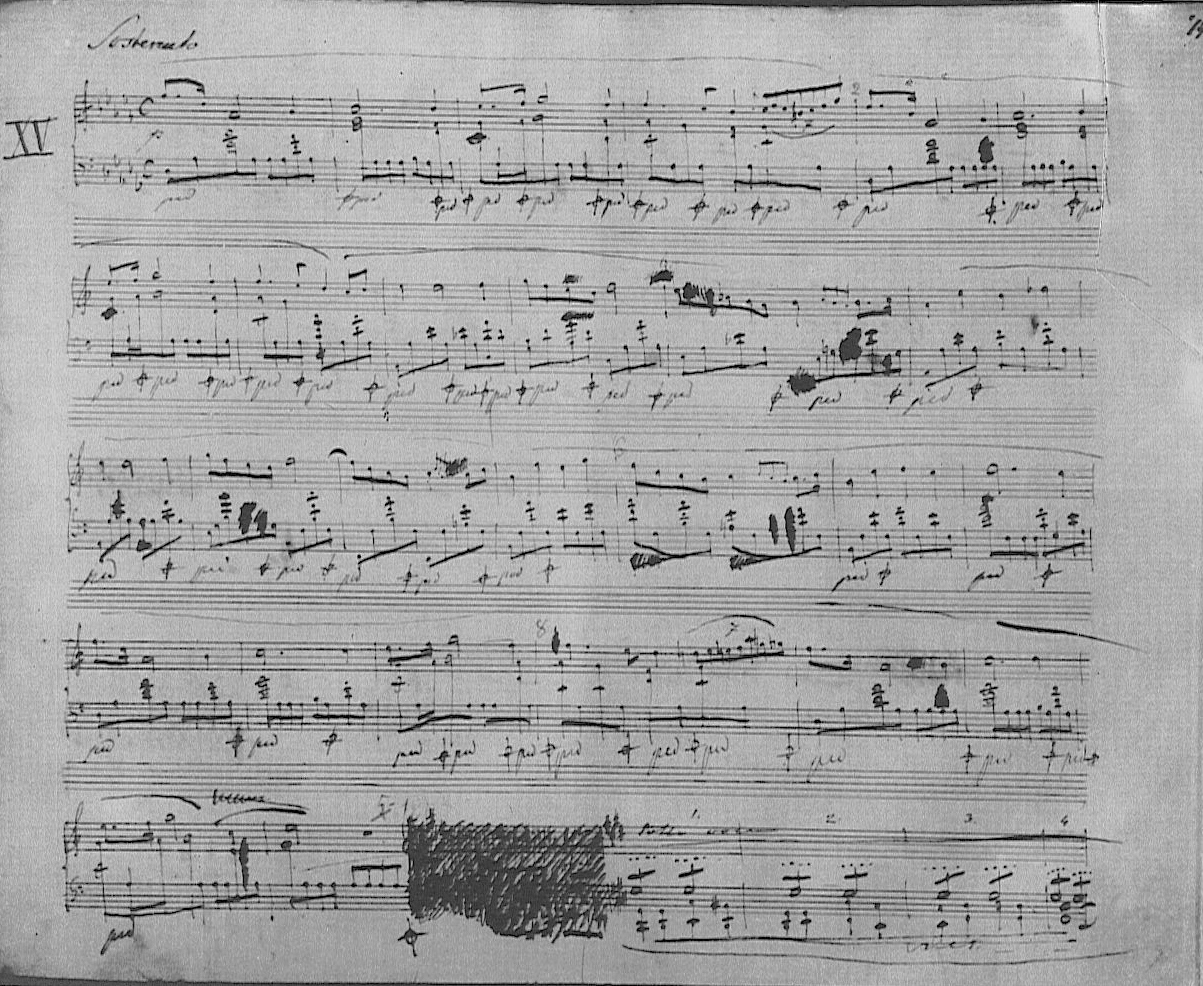
Autograph of the first page of his Prelude No. 15

Frédéric Chopin wrote a number of preludes for piano solo. His collection of 24 Preludes, Op. 28, covers all major and minor keys. In addition, Chopin wrote three other preludes: a prelude in C♯ minor, Op. 45; a piece in A♭ major from 1834; and an unfinished piece in E♭ minor. These are sometimes referred to as Nos. 25, 26, and 27, respectively.

== 24 Preludes, Op. 28 ==
Prelude Op. 28
No. 4 in E minor
Porticodoro / SmartCGArt Media Productions

No. 15 in D♭ major
Giorgi Latso

No. 16 in B♭ minor
Giorgi Latso

No. 20 in C minor
MIDI recording by Michael Angelkovich

No. 23 in F major
Giorgi Latso

More sound files at Commons

Chopin's 24 Preludes, Op. 28, are a set of short pieces for the piano, one in each of the twenty-four keys, originally published in 1839.

Chopin wrote them between 1835 and 1839, mostly in Paris, but partially at Valldemossa, Mallorca, where he spent the winter of 1838–39 and where he, George Sand, and her children went to escape the damp Paris weather. In Majorca, Chopin had a copy of Bach's The Well-Tempered Clavier, and as in each of Bach's two sets of preludes and fugues, his Op. 28 set comprises a complete cycle of the major and minor keys, albeit with a different ordering. Most of his préludes were already finished before setting foot on Majorca, however, he did finalize them there, as referenced by him in his letters to Pleyel: "I have finished my préludes here on your little piano..."

The manuscript, which Chopin carefully prepared for publication, carries a dedication to the German pianist and composer Joseph Christoph Kessler. The French and English editions (Catelin, Wessel) were dedicated to the piano-maker and publisher Camille Pleyel, who had commissioned the work for 2,000 francs (equivalent to €7,100 in 2025). The German edition (Breitkopf & Härtel) was dedicated to Kessler, who ten years earlier had dedicated his own set of 24 Preludes, Op. 31, to Chopin.

Whereas the term "prelude" had hitherto been used to describe an introductory piece, Chopin's pieces stand as self-contained units, each conveying a specific idea or emotion. He thus imparted new meaning to a genre title that at the time was often associated with improvisatory "preluding". (Note: Pianist-composers who had previously published collections of preludes for the benefit of pianists unskilled at improvisation include Muzio Clementi, Johann Nepomuk Hummel and Ignaz Moscheles; according to Richard Taruskin, Chopin probably knew Moscheles's Preludes, Op. 73 (1827) and used them as a model, alongside Bach's Well-Tempered Clavier.) In publishing the 24 preludes together as a single opus, comprising miniatures that could either be used to introduce other music or as self-standing works, Chopin challenged contemporary attitudes regarding the worth of small musical forms.

Whereas Bach had arranged his collection of 48 preludes and fugues according to keys separated by rising semitones, Chopin's chosen key sequence is a circle of fifths, with each major key being followed by its relative minor, and so on (i.e. C major, A minor, G major, E minor, etc.). Since this sequence of related keys is much closer to common harmonic practice, it is thought that Chopin might have conceived the cycle as a single performance entity for continuous recital. An opposing view is that the set was never intended for continuous performance, and that the individual preludes were indeed conceived as possible introductions for other works.

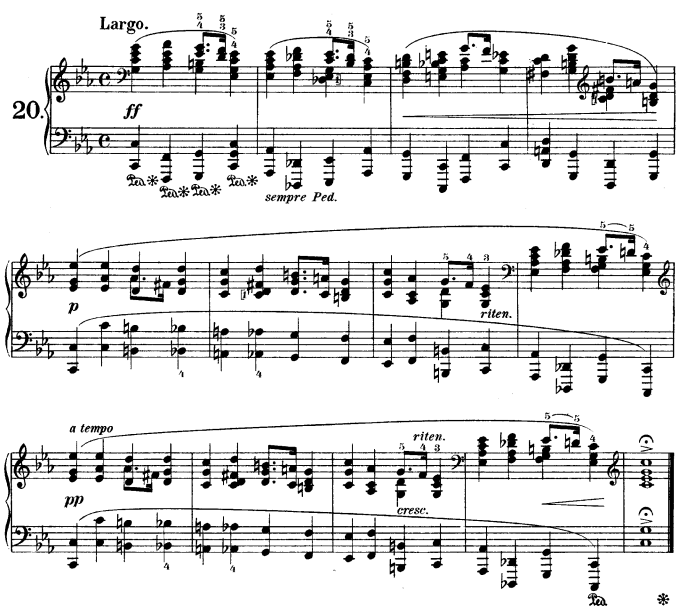
Prelude No. 20 in C minor. This prelude, modified slightly, was used as the theme for variations in both Sergei Rachmaninoff's Variations on a Theme of Chopin and in Ferruccio Busoni's Variations on a Theme of Chopin.

Chopin himself never played more than four of the preludes at any single public performance. Nor was this the practice for the 25 years after his death. The first pianist to program the complete set in a recital was probably Anna Yesipova for a concert in 1876. Nowadays, the complete set of Op. 28 preludes has become repertory fare, and many concert pianists have recorded the entire set, beginning with Ferruccio Busoni in 1915, when making piano rolls for the Duo-Art label. Alfred Cortot was the next pianist to record the complete preludes in 1926.

As with his other works, Chopin did not himself attach names or descriptions to any of the Op. 28 preludes, in contrast to many of Robert Schumann's and Franz Liszt's pieces.

=== Reputation and legacy ===
No prelude is longer than 90 bars (No. 17), and the shortest (No. 7) is ca. 45 seconds and No. 9 is a mere 12 bars (but 1 minute 25 seconds). Schumann said: "[t]hey are sketches, beginnings of études, or, so to speak, ruins, individual eagle pinions, all disorder and wild confusions." Liszt's opinion, however, was more positive: "Chopin's Preludes are compositions of an order entirely apart... they are poetic preludes, analogous to those of a great contemporary poet, who cradles the soul in golden dreams..."

Among more recent assessments, musicologist Henry Finck said that "if all piano music in the world were to be destroyed, excepting one collection, my vote should be cast for Chopin's Preludes." Biographer Jeremy Nicholas writes that "[e]ven on their own, the 24 Preludes would have ensured Chopin's claim to immortality."

In a detailed analysis, musicologist Anatole Leikin highlights a series of quotes and hidden themes centered around the dies irae sequence, the medieval sequence of the requiem mass. In doing so, the scholar emphasizes the unified conception of the collection, which presents itself as a profound meditation on the theme of death. In this perspective, the Preludes would be conceived in pairs (the first with the second, the third with the fourth, and so on), where the first would serve as a 'prelude' to the second.

Despite the lack of formal thematic structure, motives do appear in more than one prelude. Scholar Jeffrey Kresky has argued that Chopin's Op. 28 is more than the sum of its parts:

Individually they seem like pieces in their own right... But each works best along with the others, and in the intended order... The Chopin preludes seem to be at once twenty-four small pieces and one large one. As we note or sense at the start of each piece the various connections to and changes from the previous one, we then feel free to involve ourselves – as listeners, as players, as commentators – only with the new pleasure at hand.

— Jeffrey Kresky in A Reader's Guide to the Chopin Preludes

=== Descriptions ===
No.	Tempo marking	Key	Description	Notes
1	Agitato	C major	The opening prelude is unified by a triplet sixteenth-note figuration as the hands run over the keys.	
2	Lento	A minor	A slow melody over a fixed accompaniment of four-note chords played two eighth notes at a time.	Sometimes referred to as "Presentiment to Death" (or "Prelude to Death"), due to Chopin's referencing the famous Dies Irae motif throughout.
3	Vivace	G major	Has a running sixteenth-note bass ostinato throughout.	
4	Largo	E minor	This piece was played at the composer's funeral on organ. It consists of a slow melody in the right hand that prolongs tonic resolution and repeated block chords in the left hand that descend chromatically.	
5	Molto allegro	D major	Contains exuberant ostinati.	
6	Lento assai	B minor	This prelude was played at Chopin's funeral on organ. Its melancholic melody is primarily given to the left hand.	
7	Andantino	A major	In the style of a mazurka.	Used by Federico Mompou for his Variations on a Theme of Chopin, and by Zygmunt Noskowski for Z życia narodu: Obrazy fantazyjne na tle Preludium a Major Fryderyka Chopina.
8	Molto agitato	F♯ minor	A virtuosic prelude, featuring polyrhythms, continuous thirty-second-note figurations in the right hand, and triplet sixteenth notes (alternating with eighth notes) in the left hand.	
9	Largo	E major	Harmonically dense with a low "plodding" bass line. This is the shortest of the preludes with just 12 bars.	
10	Molto allegro	C♯ minor	Short and light, with alternating triplet and non-triplet sixteenth notes in the right hand, over arpeggiated chords in the left.	
11	Vivace	B major	In 6/8 time, a brisk prelude with continuous eighth notes.	
12	Presto	G♯ minor	Presents a technical challenge with its rapid hold-and-release of eighth notes against quarter notes in the right hand, involving chromatic movement.	
13	Lento	F♯ major	A lengthy prelude featuring an A–B–A structure with continuous eighth-note movement in the left hand and chords and a nocturne-like melody in the right.	
14	Allegro	E♭ minor	Recalls No. 1 in its brevity and textural uniformity. Recalls the fourth movement of Chopin's second sonata with its brevity and rapid chords with only a rest at the end of the prelude.	
15	Sostenuto	D♭ major	The main melody is repeated three times; the melody in the B section is much more dark and dramatic. The key signature switches between D♭ major and C♯ minor and an A♭/G♯ sounds throughout the prelude.	The longest and one of the best known of the twenty-four. Usually called "Raindrop Prelude".
16	Presto con fuoco	B♭ minor	Starts with six heavily accented chords before progressing to a virtuosic impromptu-like passage.	Vladimir de Pachmann said of it, "The sixteenth is my great favorite! It is le plus grand tour de force in Chopin. It is the most difficult of all the preludes technically, possibly excepting the nineteenth. In this case, presto is not enough. It should be played prestissimo, or, better still, vivacissimo."
17	Allegretto	A♭ major	At 90 measures long, this is one of the longer preludes and challenges the pianist with many hand crossing over maneuvers. In the middle section of the keyboard, the rhythmic 6/8 chords will be played by both thumbs and care must be taken to ensure a legato and singing melody during these crossovers.	Chopin himself, normally not given to composing with particular images in mind, told his pupil Mme. Dubois that the prelude is based on the sound of an old clock which strikes the eleventh hour, and just as the clock does not alter the volume of its chimes, so too should the eleven bass notes towards the end be played without diminuendo. This instruction has been widely disregarded by pianists. The favorite of Clara and Robert Schumann. Mendelssohn wrote of it, "I love it! I cannot tell you how much or why; except perhaps that it is something which I could never at all have written."
18	Molto allegro	F minor	Technical challenges lie chiefly in the irregular timing of the three runs, each faster than its predecessor, played simultaneously by each hand one octave apart. A fortissimo five-octave arpeggio echoes downward into the depths of the bass registers, where the final struggle takes place and culminates with the double-fortissimo chord finale.	
19	Vivace	E♭ major	A virtuosic prelude, consists of widely spaced, continuous triplet eighth-note movement in both hands that stretches up to fourteen notes.	
20	Largo	C minor	Often called the "Chord" prelude. Brief, with large slow quarter-note chords in the right hand predominating, against quarter-note octaves in the left. It was originally written in two sections of four measures, although Chopin later added a repeat of the last four measures at a softer level, with an expressive swell before the final cadence.	Used as a theme for variations by Ferruccio Busoni, and later, without the repeated bars, by Sergei Rachmaninoff in his Variations on a Theme of Chopin, a set of 22 variations in a wide range of keys, tempos and lengths.
21	Cantabile	B♭ major	While the right hand sings a simple melody, the left plays continuous doubled eighth notes characterized by chromatic movement, including chromatic nonharmonic tones, taken up by the right hand also in the latter half of the piece.	Incipit
22	Molto agitato	G minor	In 6/8 time, it begins with a characteristic dotted rhythm with octaves in the left hand (eighth, dotted eighth, and sixteenth notes) that Scriabin was later to adopt in his early Chopin-esque preludes.	
23	Moderato	F major	A melodic left hand, ornamented with trills, and supported by running sixteenth notes throughout in the right.	
24	Allegro appassionato	D minor	Opens with a thundering five-note pattern in the left hand. Throughout the piece, the left hand continues this pattern as the right hand melody is punctuated by trills, scales (including a rapid descending chromatic scale in thirds), and arpeggios. The piece closes with three booming unaccompanied low Ds on the piano. The piece is used at the conclusion of a reconstructed film about the 1944 Warsaw Uprising at the Warsaw Rising Museum.	

- See also: Media related to Category:Preludes op. 28 by Frédéric Chopin at Wikimedia Commons

=== Comparisons ===
Chopin's Op. 28 preludes have been compared to Johann Sebastian Bach's preludes in The Well-Tempered Clavier. However, each of Bach's preludes leads to a fugue in the same key, and Bach's pieces are arranged, in each of the work's two volumes, in ascending chromatic order (with major preceding parallel minor), while Chopin's are arranged in a circle of fifths (with major preceding relative minor). Chopin is known to have studied Bach's music, although he is not known to have performed it publicly.

Harold C. Schonberg, in The Great Pianists, writes: "It also is hard to escape the notion that Chopin was very familiar with Hummel's now-forgotten Op. 67, composed in 1815 – a set of twenty-four preludes in all major and minor keys, starting with C major." As Schonberg says: "the openings of the Hummel A minor and Chopin E minor concertos are too close to be coincidental." The dedicatee of Chopin's set, Joseph Christoph Kessler, also used the circle of fifths in his 24 Études, Op. 20, which were dedicated to Hummel.

== Chopin's other preludes ==
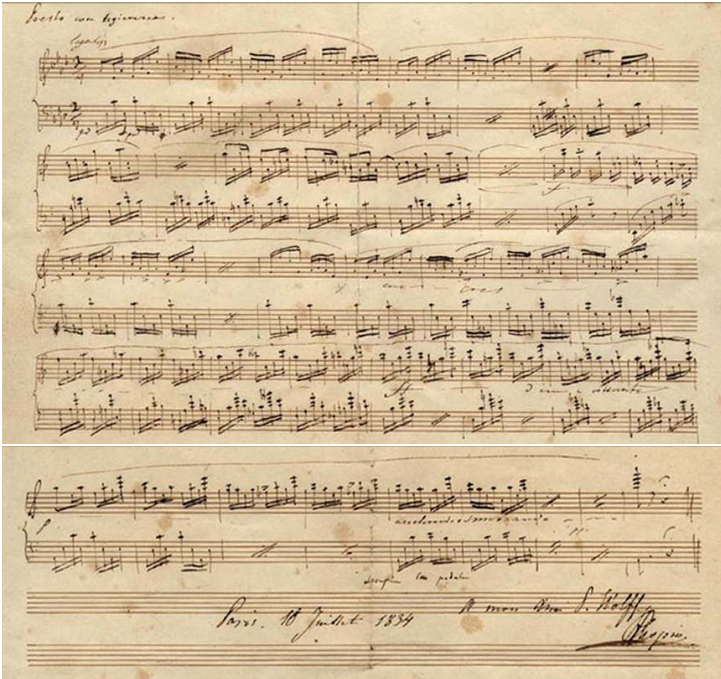
Prelude No. 26 (autograph)

Prelude No. 27 (autograph)

Chopin wrote three other preludes.

=== Prelude No. 25 (Op. 45) ===
The Prelude in C♯ minor, Op. 45 (sometimes listed as Prelude No. 25), was composed in 1841. It was dedicated to Princess E. Czernicheff (Elisaweta Tschernyschewa), and contains widely extending basses and highly expressive and effective chromatic modulations over a rather uniform thematic basis.

=== Prelude No. 26 ===
The untitled Presto con leggierezza in A♭ major was composed in 1834 as a gift for Pierre Wolff and published in Geneva in 1918. Sometimes known as Prelude No. 26, the piece is very short and generally bright in tone.

=== Prelude (No. 27) ===
A further prelude exists in E♭ minor and has been subtitled "Devil's Trill" by Jeffrey Kallberg, a professor of music history at the University of Pennsylvania. Kallberg gave it this nickname for its similarities to Giuseppe Tartini's violin sonata known as The Devil's Trill, Tartini being a likely influence on Chopin. The original signature was hastily scrawled (more so than usual of Chopin's original manuscripts).

Chopin left this piece uncompleted and seems to have discarded it; while he worked on it during his stay on Majorca, the E♭ minor prelude that ultimately formed part of the Op. 28 set is an unrelated piece. Kallberg's realisation of the prelude from Chopin's almost illegible sketches goes no further than where Chopin left off. The piece had its first public performance in July 2002 at the Newport Music Festival in Newport, Rhode Island, with the pianist Alain Jacquon.

== Notes and references ==
=== Sources ===
- Kallberg, Jeffrey (1994). "Small 'forms': in defence of the prelude". In Samson, Jim (ed.). The Cambridge Companion to Chopin. Cambridge Companions to Music. Cambridge: Cambridge University Press. pp. 124–144. ISBN 978-0-521-47752-9.
- Taruskin, Richard (24 June 2009). "The Chopinesque Miniature". The Oxford History of Western Music: Music in the Nineteenth Century. Oxford: Oxford University Press. pp. 333–338. ISBN 978-0-19-979602-1.
- Schonberg, Harold C. (1987). The Great Pianists. Simon & Schuster. ISBN 978-0-671-63837-5.
