= Los Molinos, Madrid =

Coordinates: 40°42′40″N 4°04′28″W

Los Molinos
- Municipality
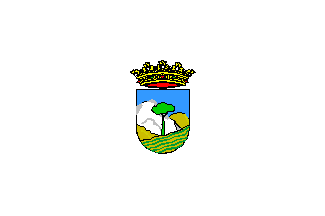
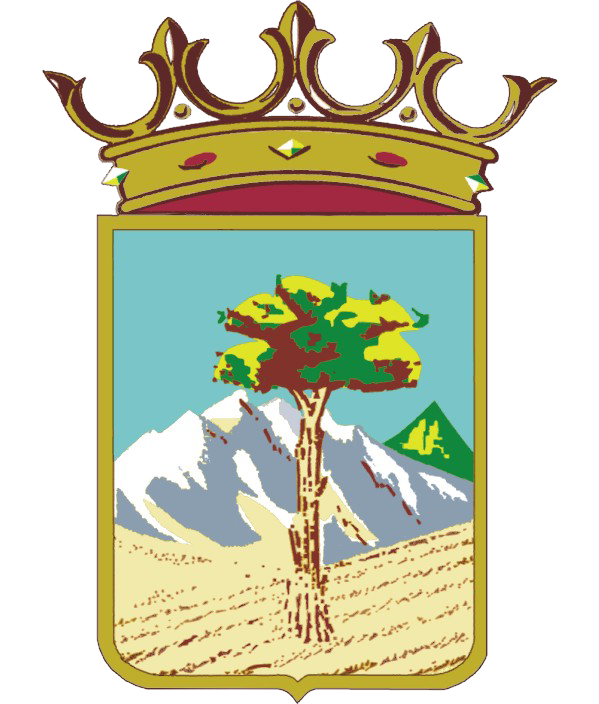
- Flag Coat of arms

- Municipal location within the Community of Madrid.
- Country: Spain
- Autonomous community: Community of Madrid

Population (2025-01-01)
  - Total: 4,781
- Time zone: UTC+1 (CET)
  - Summer (DST): UTC+2 (CEST)

Los Molinos is a municipality of the Community of Madrid, Spain.
