= Josep Mompou =

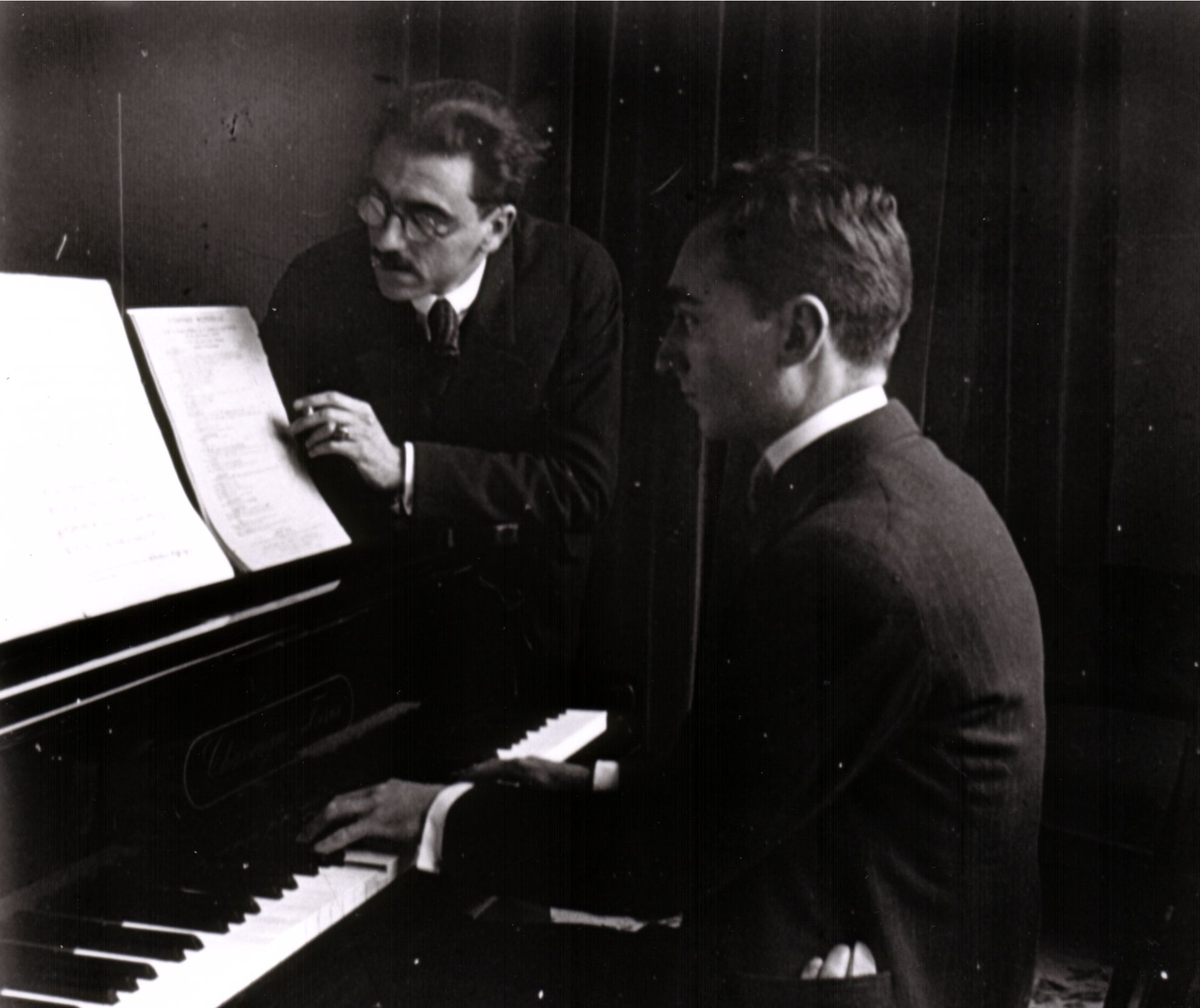
Mompou and his brother Frederico.

Josep Mompou (1888–1968) was a Spanish painter. His work in the permanent collections of the Museu Nacional d'Art de Catalunya, the Museo Nacional Centro de Arte Reina Sofía, and the Carmen Thyssen Museum. His brother, Federico Mompou, was a pianist and composer.
