= Éditions Maurice Senart =

French music publishing company

Maurice Senart Publishing
- Native name: Éditions Maurice Senart
- Company type: Société Anonyme
- Industry: Music
- Founded: 1878
- Founders: Maurice Senart and B. Roudanez
- Defunct: 1962
- Fate: Liquidated
- Headquarters: Paris, France
- Key people: Maurice Senart
- Products: Music publisher

Éditions Maurice Senart was an historic French music publishing company founded by Maurice Senart (29 January 1878 in Paris – 23 May 1962 Id.) operating in Paris from 1908 to 1941.

== History ==
Founded in partnership with B. Roudanez, Senart ran the firm alone from 1912 to 1920, when Albert Neuburger came on board. The firm was renamed Société Anonyme des Editions Maurice Senart. The firm's catalog was sold to Editions Salabert in 1941, which continued to issue its holdings under the series Collection Maurice Senart.

The firm created a large catalog of over 5000 works by 1925. Early editions were of works by composer Vincent d'Indy and the Schola Cantorum group of organ composers. The firm was important in the publication of works by many modernist composers in the 1920s including Cras, Casella, Delannoy, Koechlin, Malipiero, Milhaud, and Spalding. It was especially influential in launching the early career of Arthur Honegger. Alfred Cortot's important editions of works by Chopin, Liszt, and Schumann were issued as part of the series Edition National de Musique Classique.

The firm published some of the earliest modern editions of Renaissance vocal music by Antoine Brumel, Goudimel, Janequin, Mouton, and Lassus. This was made possible though the patronage of a Lebanese industrialist, Négib Sursock in 1924.

== Notable series ==
- Les Maîtres Contemporains de l'Orgue (8 volumes, 1912, ed. J. Joubert)
- Musique de Chambre (ed. J. Peyrot and J. Rebuffat)
- Edition Nationale de Musique Classique (begun in 1930)
- Les Maîtres Français du Violon au XVIIIe Siècle (Ed. J. Debroux)
- Chants de France et d'Italie (Ed. H. Expert)
- Les Monuments de la Musique Française au Temps de la Renaissance (1924–29, 10 volumes, ed. H. Expert)
- Les Maîtres de la Renaissance Française (ed. H. Expert)
