= Jordi Masó (pianist) =

Spanish classical pianist

Jordi Masó is a Catalan classical pianist.

== Biography and career ==
Jordi Masó was born in Barcelona, Catalonia, and studied at the Barcelona Conservatory with Josep M. Roger, at the Barcelona School of Music, with Albert Attenelle, and at the Royal Academy of Music of London with Christopher Elton and Nelly Akopian. He graduated from the Royal Academy of Music in 1992 with a DipRAM, the institution's highest distinction.

Masó specializes in the music of Spanish composers, notably those of the 20th and 21st centuries. He has won first prizes in a number of national and international competitions, and has performed in most European countries, in South America and in Asia. He regularly performs as a soloist with major Spanish orchestras. Since 1996, he has been a member of the contemporary music group Barcelona 216, which won the Barcelona City Prize for music in 2000. In 2008 he was awarded the Associated Royal Academy of Music (ARAM), given to the academy most distinguished students.

Masó has recorded several dozen CDs for labels such as Anacrusi, Marco Polo, and Naxos. He specializes in Spanish music, and has notably recorded the complete piano music of Frederic Mompou on six discs, and the complete piano music of Padre Donostia. He is currently working on recordings of the complete piano music of Joaquín Turina and Déodat de Séverac for Naxos.

Masó teaches piano at the Granollers Conservatory and at the ESMUC (Escola Superior de Música de Catalunya).
