= Federico Mompou =

Catalan composer and pianist (1893–1987)

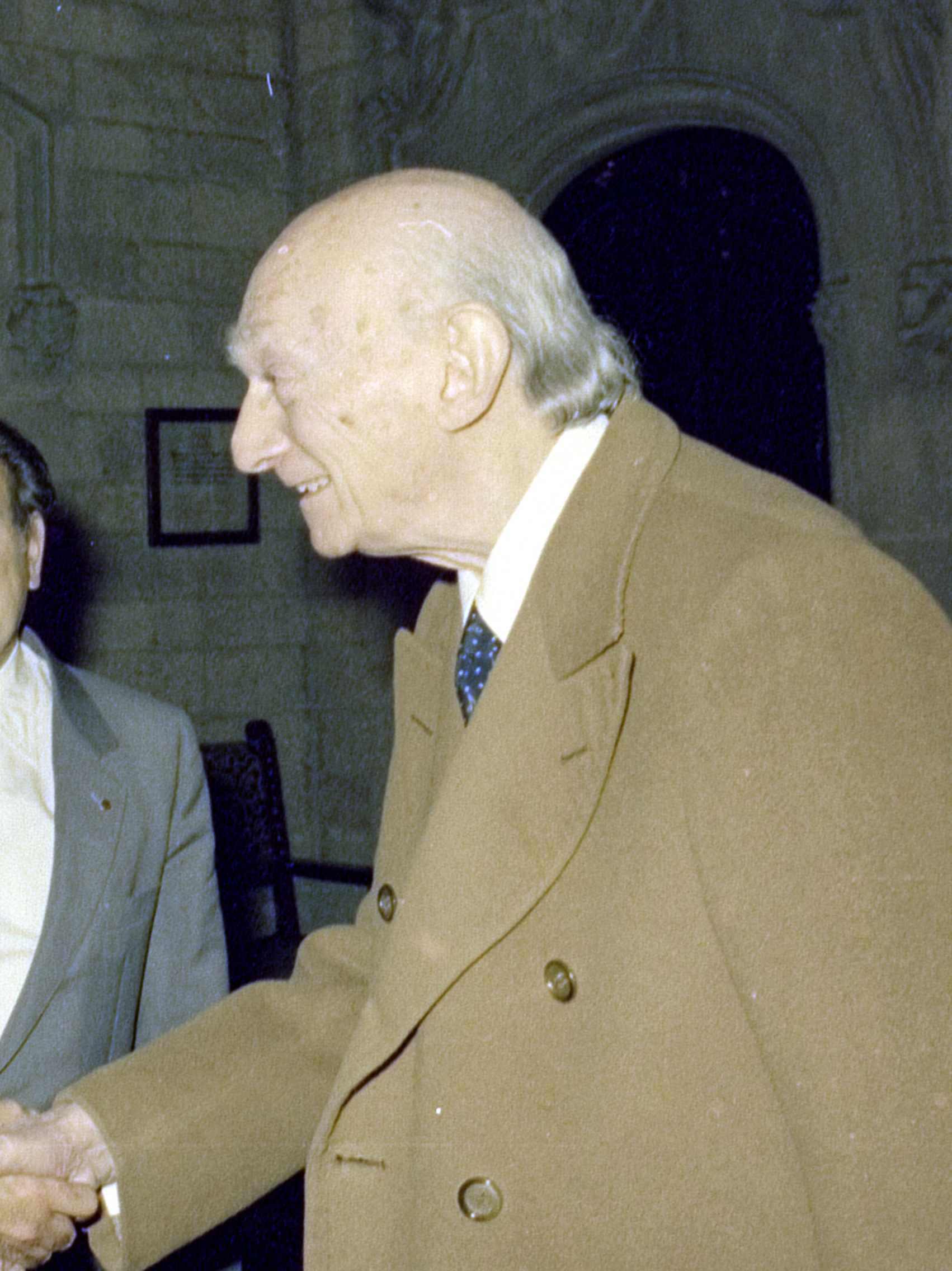
- Mompou in 1980

Background information
- Born: Frederic Mompou Dencausse; 16 April 1893; Barcelona, Catalonia, Spain
- Died: 30 June 1987 (aged 94) Barcelona, Catalonia, Spain
- Genres: Classical
- Occupations: Musician; composer
- Instrument: Piano
- Years active: 1920–1980s
- Labels: EMI
- Spouse: Carme Bravo (m. 1957–1987)
- Awards: See list: Chevalier des arts et lettres (fr); Premio Nacional de Música (es); Honoris causa, University of Barcelona (1979); Gold Medal of the Generalitat of Catalonia (1980)
- Website: fundaciomompou.cat/en

Frederic Mompou Dencausse (Catalan: [fɾəðəˈɾiɡ mumˈpow]; 16 April 1893 – 30 June 1987), or Federico Mompou, was a Catalan composer and pianist.

== Life ==
=== Early years ===
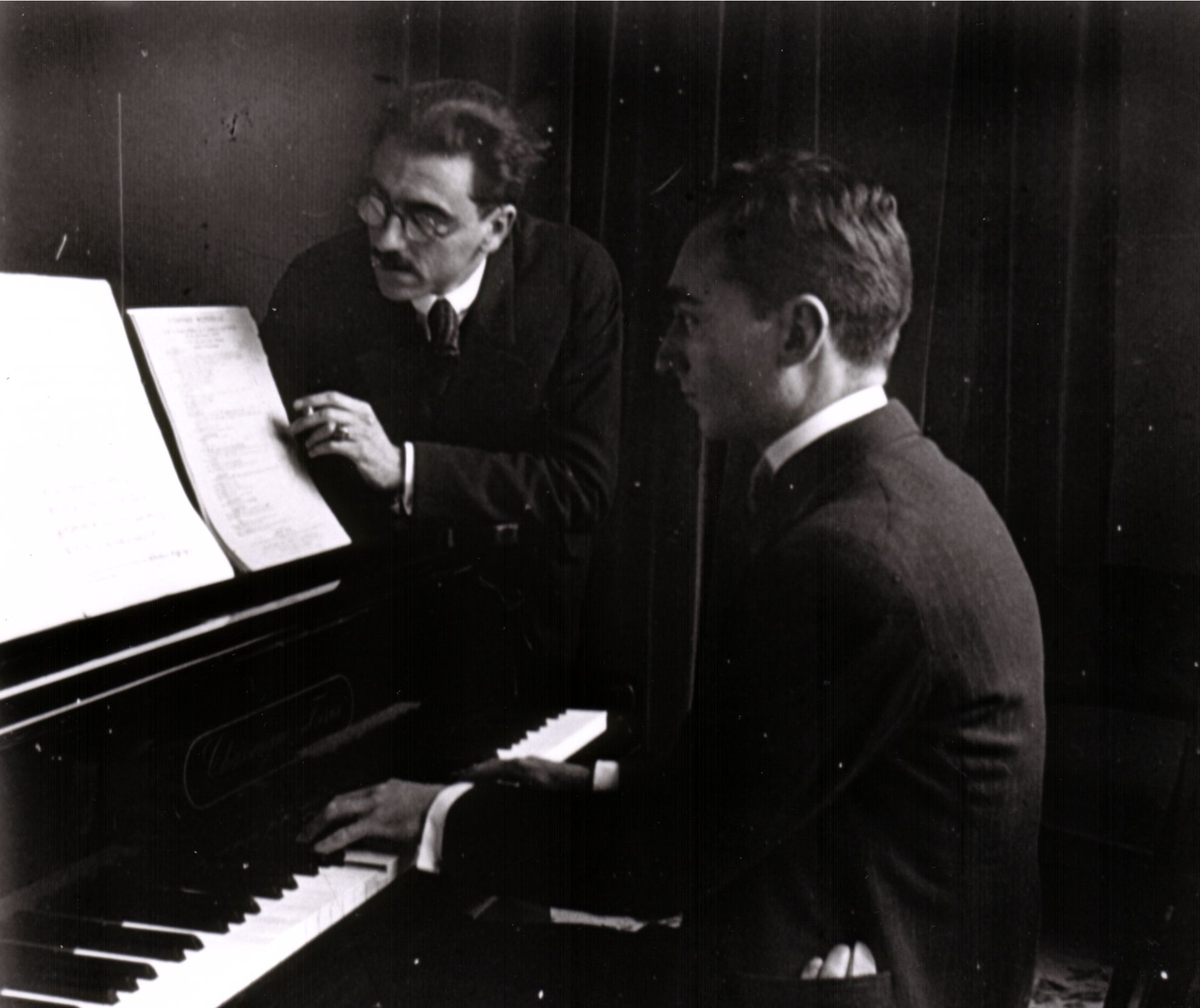
Josep and Frederic Mompou at their family home, 1915

Mompou was born in Barcelona to the lawyer Frederic Mompou and his wife, Josefina Dencausse, who was of French origin. His brother Josep Mompou (1888–1968) became a painter. His sketch of a simple farmhouse appeared on the covers of all of Frederic's published music.

Mompou studied piano under Pedro Serra at the Conservatori Superior de Música del Liceu before going to Paris to study at the Conservatoire de Paris, which was headed by Gabriel Fauré. Mompou had heard Fauré perform in Barcelona when he was nine years old, and his music and performing style had made a powerful and lasting impression on him. He had a letter of introduction to Fauré from Enrique Granados, but it never reached its intended recipient. He entered the Conservatoire (with another Spaniard, José Iturbi), and studied with Isidor Philipp, head of the piano department. He also took private piano lessons with Ferdinand Motte-Lacroix and harmony and composition lessons with Marcel Samuel-Rousseau. His extreme shyness, introspection, and self-effacement meant that he could not pursue a solo career, but chose to devote himself to composition instead. In 1917, he returned to Barcelona, fleeing the war. His first published work, Cants magics, appeared in 1920, mainly as a result of the advocacy of his friend Agustin Quintas.

=== 1920s–1950s ===
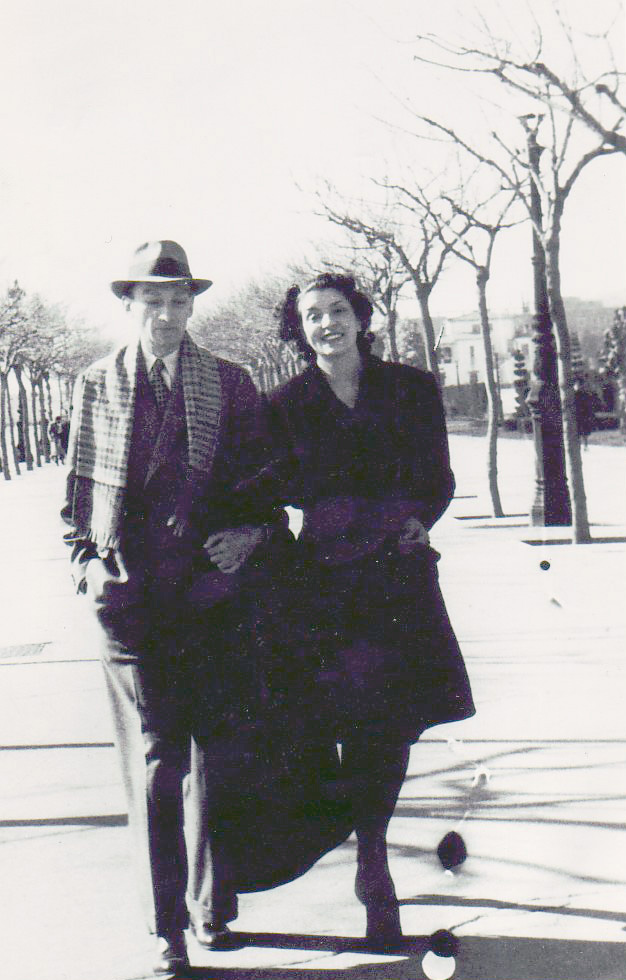
Mompou with Carme Bravo, 1943

Mompou returned to Paris in 1921, by which time his music was being regularly performed publicly by his former teacher Motte-Lacroix and others, and he found himself the darling of Paris. In 1921, his Scènes d'enfants (1915–18), performed by Motte-Lacroix, inspired the French critic Émile Vuillermoz to proclaim Mompou "the only disciple and successor" to Claude Debussy. Mompou himself often performed his own compositions but only at private soirees, never in public. However, his time in Paris was not easy. He published no music between 1931 and 1941, when he left for his native Catalonia, fleeing the German occupation of Paris. During that time, his father died and his brother became seriously ill. The Spanish Civil War troubled him greatly, and his personal financial situation was often dire enough to lead him away from music and into various business ventures, including an attempt to revive the traditional family bell foundry.

Kenneth MacMillan's ballet La Casa de los Pájaros (The House of Birds), set to orchestrations by John Lanchbery of various piano pieces by Mompou, was premiered at Sadler's Wells in London in 1955 and was also staged at the 4th Festival de Música y Danza at Granada.

In 1956 appeared Don Perlimpin (also seen as Don Perlimpinada), a ballet written in collaboration between Mompou and Xavier Montsalvatge and based on a play by Federico García Lorca. Most of the music was by Mompou, but Montsalvatge helped with the orchestration and linking passages and added two numbers of his own.

In 1957, aged 64, Mompou married the pianist Carme Bravo, who was 30 years his junior. It was the first marriage for both of them, and they had no children.

=== Later years ===
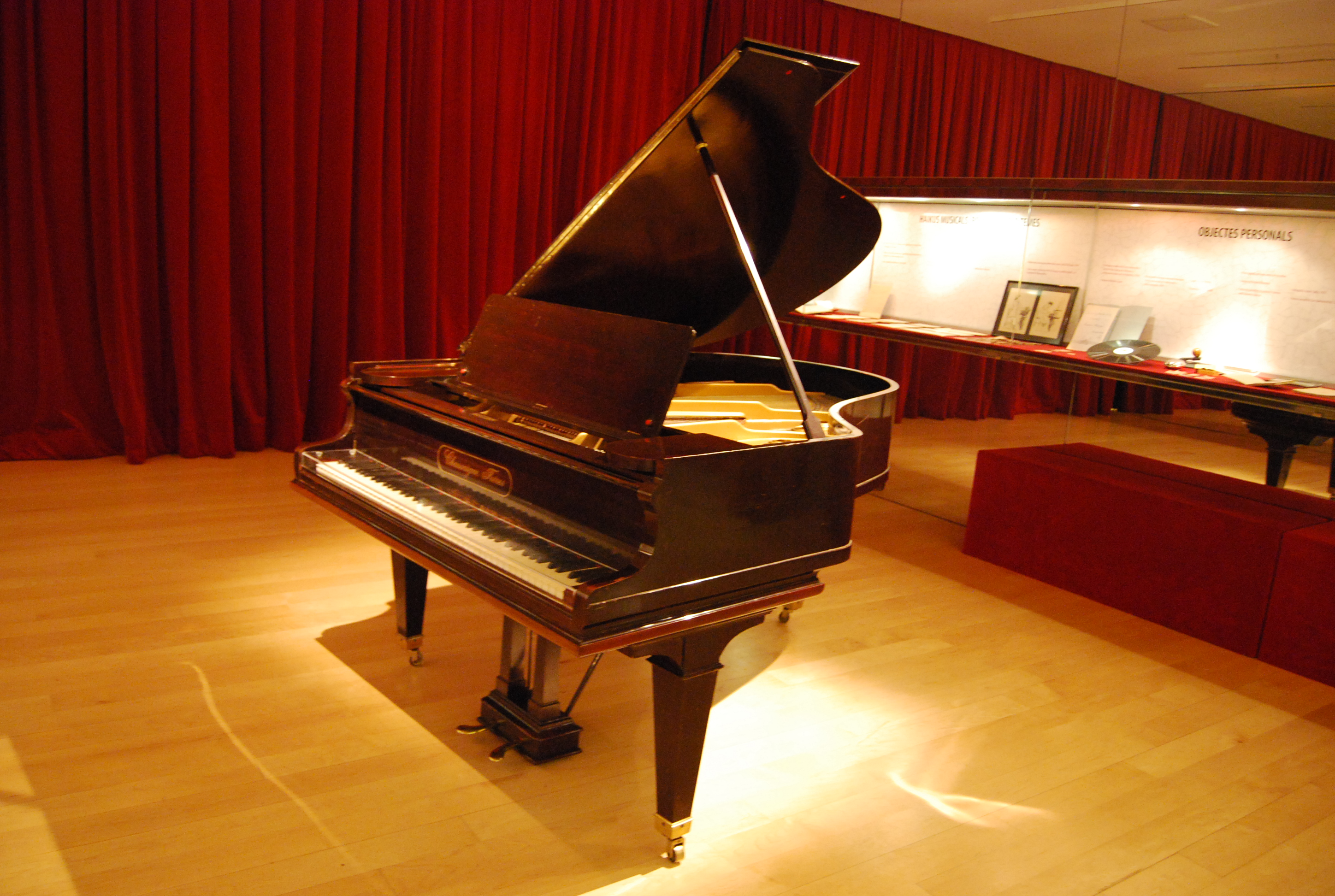
Mompou's piano, at the Museu de la Música de Barcelona, Barcelona

In 1975 and 1976, Mompou was a jury member for the first Paloma O'Shea Santander International Piano Competition. In Barcelona, he became a member of the Royal Academy of Sant Jordi; he lived there until his death in 1987 at the age of 94 from respiratory failure. He is buried at the Montjuïc Cemetery in Barcelona.

=== Discoveries ===
After the death of his widow in 2007, about 80 unpublished and hitherto unknown works were discovered in Mompou’s files at his home and also in the files of the National Library of Catalonia. Some of them were given performances in Barcelona in 2008 by Jordi Masó and Mac McClure. Many others were given their premiere performances in 2009 by Marcel Worms.

=== Awards ===
During his career Mompou received numerous awards, including: Chevalier des arts et lettres (France), Premio Nacional de Música (Spain), Doctor honoris causa, Universitat de Barcelona (1979) and Medalla d'Or de la Generalitat de Catalunya (1980).

== Style ==
Mompou was primarily a miniaturist, writing short, relatively improvisatory music, described by the pianist Stephen Hough as "the music of evaporation." According to Hough, Mompou's influences include Chopin, Debussy, Ravel, and Scriabin as well as "plainsong, folk music, and jazz (its harmonies rather than its rhythms)." Hough adds, "But his principal and fundamental stylistic ancestor ... was the eccentric, iconoclastic Erik Satie." In Mompou's music, development is minimized and expression is concentrated into very small forms. He was fond of ostinato figures, bell imitations (his mother's family owned the Dencausse bell foundry and his grandfather was a bell maker), and a kind of incantatory, meditative sound, the most complete expression of which can be found in his masterpiece, Música callada (or Music of Silence), published in four books between 1959 and 1967, its title derived from the mystical poetry of Saint John of the Cross.

He was also influenced by the sounds and smells of the maritime quarter of Barcelona, the cry of seagulls, the sound of children playing, and popular Catalan culture. He often dispensed with bar lines and key signatures. His music is rooted in the chord G♭–C–E♭–A♭–D, which he named Barri de platja (the Beach Quarter).

== Selected works ==
=== Piano solo ===
- Impresiones íntimas (Intimate impressions), 9 miniatures, written 1911–1914
- Pessebres (1914–1917) (Nativity Scenes)
- Scènes d'enfants (1915–1918) (Scenes of children; later orchestrated by Alexandre Tansman)
- Suburbis (1916–1917) (Suburbs; later orchestrated by Manuel Rosenthal)
- Cants màgics (1920) (Magic Songs)
- Fêtes lointaines (1920–1921) (Distant Celebrations)
- Charmes (1920–1921)
- Cançons i danses (1921–1979) (Songs and Dances)
- Dialogues (1923)
- 12 Préludes (1927–1960)
- Variations on a Theme of Chopin (1938–1957) (based on Chopin's Prelude No. 7 in A major)
- Paisatges (1942–1960) (Landscapes)
- El Pont (1947)
- Cançó de bressol (1951) (Lullaby)
- Música callada (Silent music or Voices of silence) (Primer cuaderno – 1959, Segundo cuaderno – 1962, Tercer cuaderno – 1965, Cuarto cuaderno – 1967)

=== Voice and piano ===
- L'hora grisa (1916) (The grey hour)
- Cuatro melodías (1925) (Four melodies)
- Comptines (1926–1943) (Nursery Rhymes)
- Combat del somni (1942–1948) (Dream combat)
- Cantar del alma (1951) (Soul Song)
- Canciones becquerianas (1971) (Songs after Bécquer)

=== Ballet ===
- Don Perlimpin (1956; written with Xavier Montsalvatge)

=== Choral ===
- Los Improperios (The Insults), for chorus and orchestra (1964; written in memory of Francis Poulenc)
- L'Ocell daurat (The Golden Bird), cantata for children's choir (1970)

=== Guitar ===
- Suite Compostelana for guitar (1962; composed for Andrés Segovia)
- "Cançó i dansa No. 10" (Sobre dos Cantigas del Rei Alfonso X), originally for piano (1953), transcribed for guitar by the composer (undated manuscript)
- "Cançó i dansa No. 13" (Cançó: El cant dels ocells; Dansa (El bon caçador)) for guitar (1972)

== Recordings ==
Mompou himself recorded a few of his piano pieces for EMI in 1950 and then a much larger portion of his piano output, including the Música callada, for Ensayo in 1974. The later recordings have been reissued in a boxed set of 4 CDs by Brilliant Classics.

Other early recordings of Mompou's piano music include a handful of miniatures recorded by notable pianists such as Artur Rubinstein, Guiomar Novaes, Magda Tagliaferro, and Arturo Benedetti Michelangeli. In the late 1950s, Mompou's wife, Carmen Bravo, recorded some of his works for Hispavox, which were released on CD by EMI with additional Mompou recordings by Spanish pianist Gonzalo Soriano.

Alicia de Larrocha recorded larger selections of Mompou's works for various labels between 1955 and 2003, including the Prelude No. 11, which Mompou had dedicated to her.

In addition to the piano recordings, the Spanish soprano Victoria de los Ángeles recorded Mompou's song cycle El combat del somni; a film of her singing one of these songs in her living room with the composer as her accompanist was recorded in 1971. And guitarist Andrés Segovia recorded Mompou's Suite Compostelana, which was dedicated to him.

After Mompou's death in 1987, his works have received greater attention. The following is a selected list of piano recordings made since then (excluding some de Larrocha recordings mentioned above):

=== Contemporary Mompou piano recordings ===
Year of release	Pianist	Notes	Label
1995	Herbert Henck	Música callada (complete)	ECM Records
1997	Stephen Hough	Collection of miniatures	Hyperion Records
1998-2011	Jordi Masó	6 volumes of piano music	Naxos
2004	Martin Jones	4-CD set	Nimbus Records
2006	Leif Ove Andsnes	2 miniatures on Horizons: A Personal Collection of Piano Encores	EMI
2006	Javier Perianes	Música callada (complete)	Harmonia Mundi
2008	Alexandre Tharaud	3 miniatures (with Chopin's Preludes & Trois Nouvelles Études)	Harmonia Mundi
2009	Marcel Worms	Unpublished Works for Piano	Zefir Records
2011	Jenny Lin	Música callada (complete)	Steinway & Sons
2012	Adolf Pla	4-CD set	La mà de Guido
2012	Martin Jones	Discoveries, 3-CD set of previously unknown piano works found when Mompou's apartment was cleared out in 2008	Nimbus Records
2012 & 2015	Clélia Iruzun	Selected works, 2 volumes	Somm
2013	Arcadi Volodos	Various miniatures with 2 song transcriptions by Volodos & 11 selections from the Música callada	Sony
2016	Aaron Krister Johnson	Música callada (complete)	digital album
2017	Luis Fernando Pérez	Collection of miniatures	Mirare
2017	Daniil Trifonov	Variations on a Theme by Chopin (on the 2-CD set Chopin Evocations)	Deutsche Grammophon

In 2001, pianist Richie Beirach recorded an album of jazz versions of Mompou, titled Round About Mompou, including various selections from the Música callada. Likewise, in 2009, jazz pianist Frank Kimbrough, who admired Mompou, recorded an improvisation based on Mompou's piece "Six" from the Música callada, Book I, on his trio album Rumors. Jazz pianist Gerald Clayton also took inspiration from Mompou, featuring his compositions "Elegia" and "Damunt de tu Només les Flors" on the 2022 album Bells On Sand.
