= Alicia de Larrocha =

Spanish pianist (1923–2009)

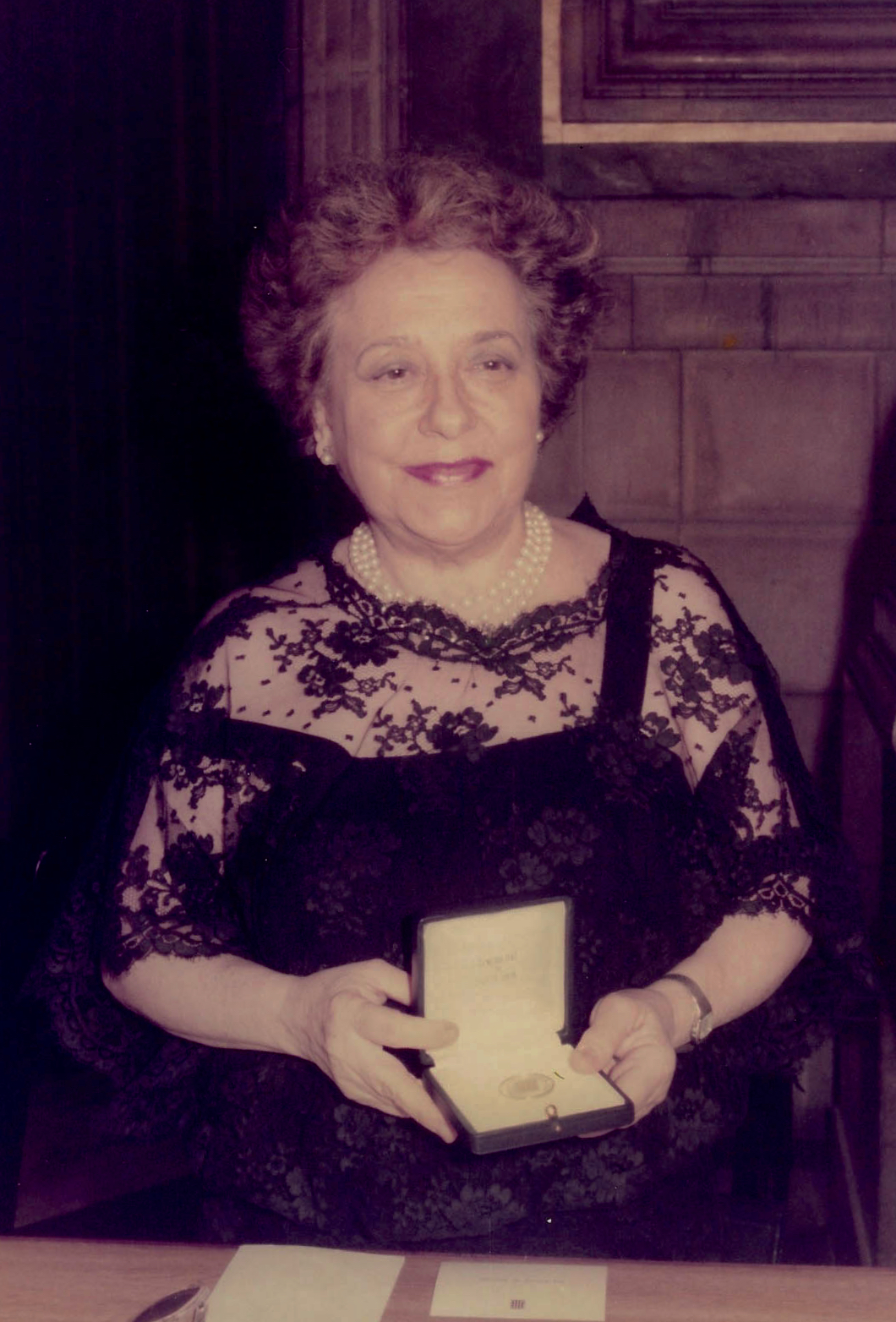
- De Larrocha in 1983
- Born: Alicia de Larrocha y de la Calle; 23 May 1923; Barcelona, Spain
- Died: 25 September 2009 (aged 86); Barcelona, Spain
- Occupations: pianist; composer

Alicia de Larrocha y de la Calle (23 May 1923 – 25 September 2009) was a Spanish pianist and composer. She was considered one of the great piano legends of the 20th century. Reuters called her "the greatest Spanish pianist in history", Time "one of the world's most outstanding pianists", and The Guardian "the leading Spanish pianist of her time".

She won four Grammy Awards, out of fourteen nominations, and a Prince of Asturias Award for the Arts. She is credited with bringing greater popularity to the compositions of Isaac Albéniz and Enrique Granados. In 1995, she became the first Spanish artist to win the UNESCO Prize.

== Life and career ==
Alicia de Larrocha was born in Barcelona, Catalonia, Spain. She began studying piano with Frank Marshall at the age of three, and later in life served as Director of his school, the Marshall Academy. Both her parents were pianists and she was the niece of pianists. She gave her first public performance at the age of five at the International Exposition in Barcelona. She performed her first concert at the age of six at the World's Fair in Seville in 1929, and had her orchestral debut at the age of eleven. By 1943, her performances were selling out in Spain. She began touring internationally in 1947, and in 1954 toured North America with the Los Angeles Philharmonic. In 1966, she engaged in a first tour of Southern Africa which proved so wildly popular that three further tours were completed In 1969, de Larrocha performed in Boston for the Peabody Mason Concert series.

De Larrocha, writes Jed Distler, "started composing at age seven and continued on and off until her 30th year, with a prolific spurt in her late teens," and while she never performed her works in public, she gave her family the choice of making them available after her death, which they have done.

De Larrocha made numerous recordings of the solo piano repertoire and in particular the works of composers of her native Spain. She is best known for her recordings of the music of Manuel de Falla, Enrique Granados, Federico Mompou, and Isaac Albéniz, as well as her 1967 recordings of Antonio Soler's keyboard sonatas. She recorded for Hispavox, CBS/Columbia/Epic, BMG/RCA and London/Decca, winning her first Grammy Award in 1975 and her last one in 1992, at the age of almost seventy. She received the Prince of Asturias Award for the Arts in 1994.

De Larrocha spoke in a 1978 interview with Contemporary Keyboard,

I don't believe there is a 'best' of anything in this life. I would say, though, that Granados was one of the great Spanish composers, and that, in my opinion, he was the only one that captured the real Romantic flavor. His style was aristocratic, elegant and poetic – completely different from Falla and Albéniz. To me, each of them is a different world. Falla was the one who really captured the spirit of the Gypsy music. And Albéniz, I think was more international than the others. Even though his music is Spanish in flavor, his style is completely Impressionistic.

Less than five feet tall and with small hands for a pianist, spanning an interval of barely a tenth on the keyboard, in her younger years she was nonetheless able to tackle all the big concertos (all five by Beethoven, Liszt's No. 1, Brahms's No. 2, Rachmaninoff's Nos. 2 and 3, both of Ravel's, and those of Prokofiev, Bartók, Bliss and Khachaturian, and many more), as well as the wide spans demanded by the music of Granados, Albéniz, and de Falla. She had a "long fifth finger" and a "wide stretch between thumb and index finger" which enhanced her technical ability.

"She made her first recordings, of Chopin, at age nine, her feet not yet able to reach the pedals" and was considered a great interpreter of Chopin.

As she grew older she began to play a different style of music; more Mozart and Beethoven were featured in her recitals and she became a regular guest at the "Mostly Mozart Festival" of the Lincoln Center for the Performing Arts in New York. In 2001, she was named Honorary Member of the Foundation for Iberian Music at The City University of New York. De Larrocha retired from public performance in October 2003, aged 80, following a 76-year career.

She has performed with several major orchestras and conductors, including Kurt Masur, Zubin Mehta, Riccardo Muti, Charles Dutoit, Colin Davis, Rafael Kubelik, André Previn, Georg Solti, Seiji Ozawa, Bernard Haitink, Wolfgang Sawallisch, Eugen Jochum, Claudio Abbado and Simon Rattle.

Alicia de Larrocha died on 25 September 2009 in Quiron Hospital, Barcelona, aged 86. She had been in declining health since breaking her hip five years previously. Her husband, the pianist Juan Torra, with whom she had two children, had died in 1982.

== Discography ==
=== Studio albums ===
Title	Album details
Mozart: Piano Concertos Nos. 21 & 23; Piano Sonata "Alla turca"	Release date: January 16, 2003; Label: RCA Red Seal

== List of awards and nominations ==
De Larrocha won several individual awards throughout her lifetime. Her extended discography has been recognized with fourteen Grammy nominations (1967, 1971, 1974, 1975 (x2), 1977 (x2), 1982 (x2), 1984, 1988, 1990, 1991, 1992), of which she won four. She received honorary degrees from the University of Michigan, Middlebury College, and Carnegie Mellon.

A crater on the planet Mercury has been named in her honor.

Year	Nominee / work	Award	Result
1960	Albéniz: Iberia – Books II & III (Erato Records)	Grand Prix du Disque	Won
1968	Granados: Goyescas – Book II, Escenas románticas (Erato Records)	Grand Prix du Disque	Won
1974	Albéniz: Iberia (Decca)	Grand Prix du Disque	Won
1991	Granados: Goyescas, Allegro De Concierto, Danza Lenta (RCA)	Grand Prix du Disque	Won
1968	?	Edison Award	Won
1978	?	Edison Award	Won
1989	Albéniz: Iberia (Decca)	Edison Award	Won
1974	Albéniz: Iberia (Decca)	Grammy Award for Best Classical Performance – Instrumental Soloist or Soloists (without orchestra)	Won
1975	Ravel: Concerto For Left Hand and Concerto For Piano in G; Faure: Fantaisie for piano and orchestra (Decca)	Grammy Award for Best Classical Performance – Instrumental Soloist or Soloists (with orchestra)	Won
1988	Albéniz: Iberia, Navarra, Suite Española (Decca)	Grammy Award for Best Classical Performance – Instrumental Soloist or Soloists (without orchestra)	Won
1991	Granados: Goyescas, Allegro De Conicerto, Danza Lenta (RCA)	Grammy Award for Best Classical Performance – Instrumental Soloist or Soloists (without orchestra)	Won
1971	?	Records of the Year (London)	Won
1974	?	Records of the Year (London)	Won
1979	Granados: Goyescas (Decca)	Deutsche Schallplattenpreis (Germany)	Won
1980	Liszt: Piano Sonata in B minor (Decca)	Franz Liszt Award (Budapest)	Won
1994	Manuel de Falla and Xavier Montsalvatge: Piano Works (RCA)	Japan Record Academy Award	Won
1978	—	Musician of the Year - Musical America (magazine)	
1988	—	Commander of the Ordre des Arts et des Lettres	
1994	—	Prince of Asturias Award for the Arts	
1995	—	UNESCO Prize	
1961	—	Paderewski Memorial Medal (London)	
1985	—	National Music Award – Interpretation	
2000	—	Premios Ondas for the most notable work in classical music	
1982	—	Gold Medal of Merit in the Fine Arts	
