= Music written in all major or minor keys =

Set of 24 pieces in major and minor keys

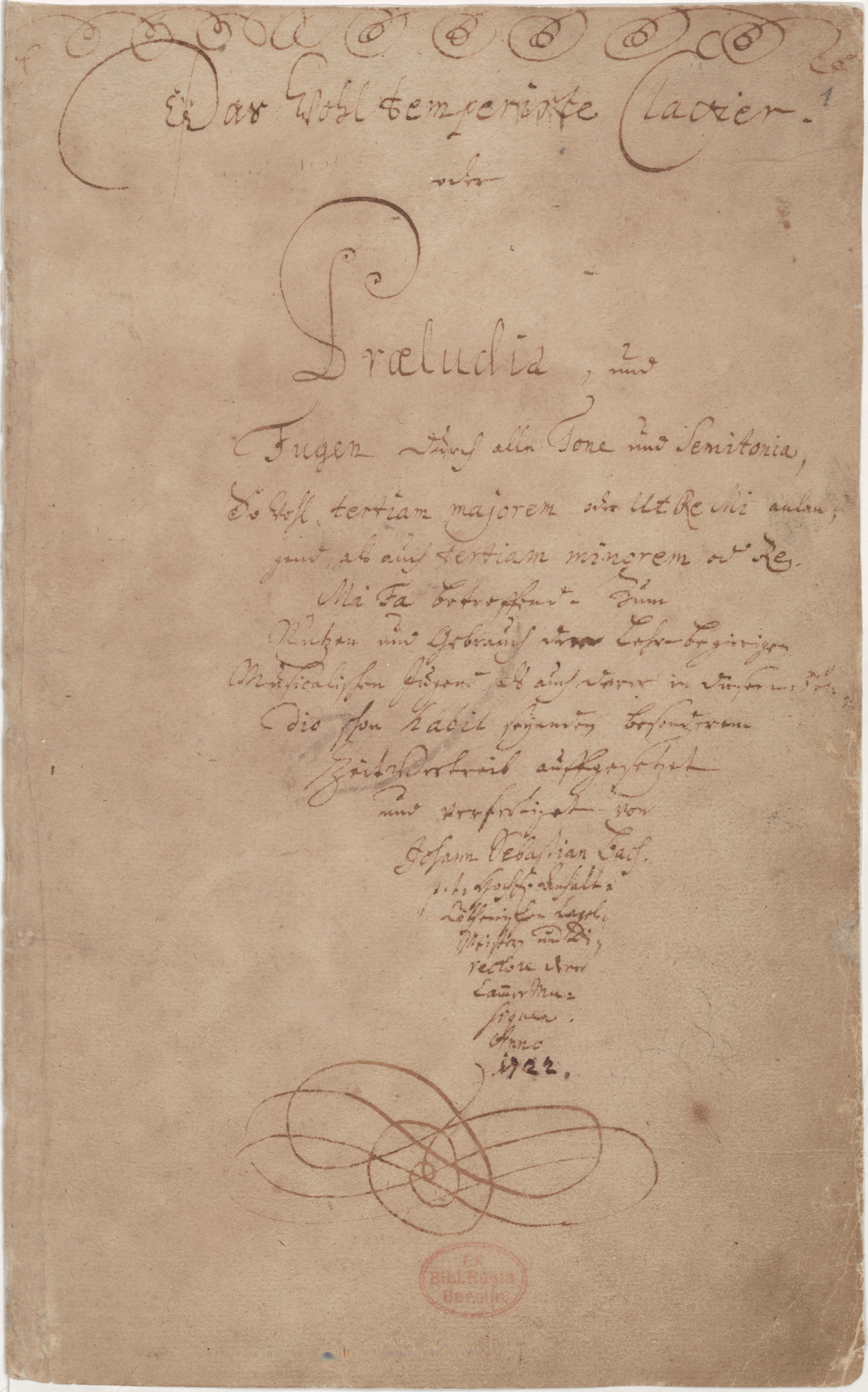
The title page of the first book of J.S. Bach's The Well-Tempered Clavier, which covers all 24 major and minor keys.

There is a long tradition in classical music of writing music in sets of pieces that cover all the major and minor keys of the chromatic scale. These sets typically consist of 24 pieces, one for each of the major and minor keys (sets that comprise all the enharmonic variants include 30 pieces).

Examples include Johann Sebastian Bach's The Well-Tempered Clavier, Frédéric Chopin's 24 Preludes, Op. 28 and Dmitri Shostakovich's 24 Preludes and Fugues, Op. 87 (1950–51). Such sets are often organized as preludes and fugues or designated as preludes or études. Some composers have restricted their sets to cover only the 12 major keys or the 12 minor keys; or only the flat keys or sharp keys (such as Franz Liszt's Transcendental Études and Sergei Lyapunov's Op. 11 set respectively — although Liszt originally intended to use the full cycle but only ended up using the neutral and flat keys, leading to Lyapunov to complete it by using the remaining sharp keys). In yet another type, a single piece may progressively modulate through a set of tonalities, as occurs in Ludwig van Beethoven's 2 Preludes through all the Major Keys, Op. 39.

The bulk of works of this type have been written for piano solo, but there also exist sets for piano 4-hands; two pianos; organ; guitar; two guitars; flute; recorder; oboe; violin solo; violin and piano; cello solo; cello and piano; voice and piano; and string quartet. There are examples of attempts to write full sets that, for one reason or another, were never completed (Josef Rheinberger's organ sonatas, Dmitri Shostakovich's string quartets, César Franck's L'Organiste).

== Notable sets that cover all 24 keys ==
- Vincenzo Galilei: Libro d’intavolature di liuto, (1584) - a work containing an early set of 24 dances for lute in all 24 keys
- Johann Sebastian Bach: The Well-Tempered Clavier, Books I and II (1722 and 1742) – two separate sets of 24 preludes and fugues, together known as "the 48".
- Frédéric Chopin: 24 Preludes, Op. 28 (1835–39)
- Franz Liszt: Transcendental Études, S. 139 (1826–52) cover only the keys in flats. Liszt did not fulfill his original intention to write the full suite of 24 études in all keys.
  - In 1897–1905, Sergei Lyapunov wrote his 12 Études d'exécution transcendante, Op. 11, which cover the remaining keys, in sharps, and are dedicated to Liszt's memory.
- Charles-Valentin Alkan: 25 Preludes, Op. 31 (1847); 24 preludes in all the major and minor keys plus an extra C major prelude, Op. 35. He also wrote 12 major key études, Op. 35 (1848), and 12 minor key études, Op. 39 (1857).
- Alexander Scriabin: 24 Preludes, Op. 11 (1893–95) – Scriabin wrote a total of 90 preludes for piano (50 in major keys, 31 in minor keys, and 9 in indeterminate keys). These contained only one complete set of preludes in all 24 major and minor keys.
- Sergei Rachmaninoff: 24 Preludes, Opp. 3/2, 23, and 32 (1892, 1901–03, and 1910)
- Paul Hindemith: Ludus Tonalis (1942) – 12 fugues and 12 interludes covering all twelve keys, where the major/minor distinction does not apply, book-ended by a praeludium and a postludium.
- Dmitry Kabalevsky: Preludes, Op. 38 (1943–44) – each in a different key and each based on a folksong
- Dmitri Shostakovich: 24 Preludes and Fugues, Op. 87 (1950–51) – Shostakovich also wrote a separate set of 24 Preludes, Op. 34 in 1933.

=== Composers who wrote multiple sets ===
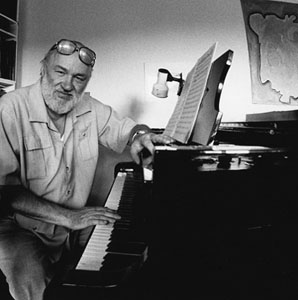
Composer Niels Viggo Bentzon wrote 14 complete sets of 24 Preludes and Fugues.

A number of composers have written multiple sets of works covering all the keys of the scale.

- 14 sets: Niels Viggo Bentzon (1919–2000) wrote 14 complete sets of 24 Preludes and Fugues, a total of 336 pieces in this genre alone. Roberto Novegno (born 1981) has also written 14 complete sets of preludes so far, each using a different sequence of keys.
- 8 sets: Carl Czerny
- 5 sets: Charles-Valentin Alkan, Joachim Andersen
- 4 sets: Richard Hofmann, Franciszek Zachara
- 3 sets: Adolf von Henselt, Charles Koechlin, Christian Heinrich Rinck
- 2 sets: Lera Auerbach, David Cope, Johann Baptist Cramer, Ferdinand David, Hans Gál, Stefano Golinelli, Johann Nepomuk Hummel, Aaron Andrew Hunt, Friedrich Kalkbrenner, Nikolai Kapustin, Joseph Christoph Kessler, Craig Sellar Lang, Trygve Madsen, Désiré Magnus, Ignaz Moscheles, Rob Peters, Jaan Rääts, Igor Rekhin, Dmitri Shostakovich (he also left unfinished a set of string quartets in all keys), Sir Charles Villiers Stanford, Sulkhan Tsintsadze, Louis Vierne, Vsevolod Zaderatsky
- other: Franz Liszt wrote only one set of his own, but he also transcribed for piano solo a set for violin and piano by Ferdinand David. Josef Rheinberger wrote one full set, and died before completing a further set of organ sonatas.

Full details are shown in the tables below.

== Variants ==
=== Single pieces that modulate through many keys ===
Ludwig van Beethoven wrote 2 Preludes through all 12 Major Keys, Op. 39 for piano (1789). These two preludes each progressively traverse the 12 major keys. In Prelude No. 1, each key occupies from 2 to 26 bars. The keys of C♯ and D♭, which are enharmonically equivalent, are both represented. C major both opens and closes the set. In Prelude No. 2, the cycle of keys appears twice; in the first cycle, the number of bars per key ranges from 1 to 8; in the second half, after C every new key signature lasts for only one bar; the cycle concludes with 15 bars of C major. There is no evidence that Beethoven intended to write similar sets in the 12 minor keys.

Giovanni Battista Vitali (1632–1692) included in Artificii musicali, Op. 13 (1689) a passacaglia which modulates through eight major keys (out of twelve) from E♭ major to E major through the cycle of fifths.

Fugue No. 8 from Reicha's 36 Fugues

Fugue No. 8 from Anton Reicha's Trente six Fugues pour le Piano-Forté composées d'après un nouveau systême (subtitled Cercle harmonique) modulates through all keys.

The rondo theme of Darius Milhaud's Le bœuf sur le toit is played fifteen times in all 12 major keys (twice in A major and three times in the tonic, C major). It also passes through every minor key except E minor and B minor.

=== Works covering all eight church modes ===
Around 1704, Johann Pachelbel completed his 95 Magnificat Fugues, which covered all eight of the church modes.

Charles-Valentin Alkan composed Petits préludes sur les huit gammes du plain-chant, for organ (1859, no opus number), a sequence of eight organ preludes covering each of the church modes.

In the music of the Eastern Orthodox Church, the doxasticon for Vespers of the Dormition is notable as a single hymn that includes passages in all eight tones of the Byzantine Octoechos.

=== Other sets of 24 pieces ===
Not all sets of 24 pieces belong in this category. For example, there was no intention in Niccolò Paganini's 24 Caprices for solo violin, Claude Debussy's 24 Préludes for piano, or Pavel Zemek Novak's 24 Preludes and Fugues for piano to cover all the keys. (Paganini may not have been aware of Pierre Rode's 24 Caprices for violin, which did span the 24 keys and were written almost at the same time as Paganini's.)

Chopin's 24 Études, Opp. 10 & 25 might have originally been planned to be in all 24 keys. In fact, apart from Nos. 7 and 8, the first series (Op. 10) is made of couples of études in a major key and its relative minor (the major key either preceding the minor key or following it) with none of the tonalities occurring twice (except for C major, which appears in No. 1 and then in the only couple which is not major-minor, i.e. Nos. 7 and 8). But in the second series (Op. 25) this tonal scheme gets more and more loose. It is still possible to see connections on a tonal basis between the couples of études in Op. 25, but they are not based on one principle (e.g. Nos. 3 and 4 in F major – A minor, two tonalities which Chopin likes to put together very often, as in his second Ballade).

== Keys ==
There are 12 notes in the octave, and each of them can be the tonic of one major and one minor key. This gives 24 possible keys, but each note can be represented by several enharmonic note names (note names which designate the same actual note in the 12 note octave such as G♯ and A♭) and so each key can be represented by several enharmonic key names (e.g. G♯ minor and A♭ minor).

In practice, the choice of key name is restricted to the 30 keys whose signatures have no double flats or double sharps. (Such key signatures are used for so-called theoretical keys which are almost never encountered outside music-theoretical exercises.) (Note: In extremely rare cases, theoretical keys do appear with their double-accidental key signatures in real music: an example is John Foulds' A World Requiem, which ends in G-sharp major with F in the key signature.) Keys with 6 flats and 6 sharps, (Note: G♭ major and F♯ major, E♭ minor and D♯ minor) with 7 flats and 5 sharps (Note: C♭ major and B major, A♭ minor and G♯ minor) and with 5 flats and 7 sharps (Note: D♭ major and C♯ major, B♭ minor and A♯ minor) are enharmonic to one another. Composers will, in most (though not all) cases, choose only one key from each enharmonic pair. But there are also cases of sets covering all 30 keys, which, in other words, include all enharmonic variants.

The table below outlines the choices made in the various collections listed here. The keys are in the order that J.S. Bach used.

	Key	Key signature	Comments
1	C major	No sharps or flats	
2	C minor	3 flats	
3	C♯ major	7 sharps	J.S. Bach and Alkan chose C♯ major, but most composers have used D♭ major.
3	D♭ major	5 flats	J.S. Bach and Alkan chose C♯ major, but most composers have used D♭ major.
4	C♯ minor	4 sharps	
5	D major	2 sharps	
6	D minor	1 flat	
7	E♭ major	3 flats	
8	D♯ minor	6 sharps	Most composers of sets of 24 pieces used E♭ minor rather than D♯ minor. J.S. Bach, Lyapunov and Ponce are among the few who have used D♯. The first use of D♯ minor was in J.S. Bach's The Well-Tempered Clavier, in Fugue No. 8 from Book 1 (although its corresponding Prelude was written in E♭ minor), while D♯ minor was used for both the Prelude and the Fugue in Book 2. Another is in Lyapunov's Étude d'execution transcendante No. 2, subtitled "Ronde des Fantômes".
8	E♭ minor	6 flats	Most composers of sets of 24 pieces used E♭ minor rather than D♯ minor. J.S. Bach, Lyapunov and Ponce are among the few who have used D♯. The first use of D♯ minor was in J.S. Bach's The Well-Tempered Clavier, in Fugue No. 8 from Book 1 (although its corresponding Prelude was written in E♭ minor), while D♯ minor was used for both the Prelude and the Fugue in Book 2. Another is in Lyapunov's Étude d'execution transcendante No. 2, subtitled "Ronde des Fantômes".
9	E major	4 sharps	
10	E minor	1 sharp	
11	F major	1 flat	
12	F minor	4 flats	
13	F♯ major	6 sharps	F♯ major was the choice of J.S. Bach, Hummel, Chopin, Heller, Busoni, Lyapunov, Arensky, Blumenfeld, Ponce, Shostakovich, Cui and Glière. G♭ major, on the other hand, was preferred by Alkan, Rachmaninoff, Scriabin, Shchedrin, Bowen, Stanford and Winding.
13	G♭ major	6 flats	F♯ major was the choice of J.S. Bach, Hummel, Chopin, Heller, Busoni, Lyapunov, Arensky, Blumenfeld, Ponce, Shostakovich, Cui and Glière. G♭ major, on the other hand, was preferred by Alkan, Rachmaninoff, Scriabin, Shchedrin, Bowen, Stanford and Winding.
14	F♯ minor	3 sharps	
15	G major	1 sharp	
16	G minor	2 flats	
17	A♭ major	4 flats	
18	G♯ minor	5 sharps	Alkan wrote a piece in A♭ minor, and Brahms a fugue in this key, but most composers have preferred G♯ minor.
18	A♭ minor	7 flats	Alkan wrote a piece in A♭ minor, and Brahms a fugue in this key, but most composers have preferred G♯ minor.
19	A major	3 sharps	
20	A minor	No sharps or flats	
21	B♭ major	2 flats	
22	A♯ minor	7 sharps	No well-known sets of 24 pieces include A♯ minor. Two examples are from Bartolomeo Campagnoli's 30 Preludes for violin, and Christian Heinrich Rinck's 30 Préludes from his Practical Organ School, Op. 55, published before 1821.
22	B♭ minor	5 flats	No well-known sets of 24 pieces include A♯ minor. Two examples are from Bartolomeo Campagnoli's 30 Preludes for violin, and Christian Heinrich Rinck's 30 Préludes from his Practical Organ School, Op. 55, published before 1821.
23	B major	5 sharps	No well-known sets of 24 pieces include C♭ major. While this key is sometimes used in compositions (particularly for the harp, which is especially suited to this key), it is not generally considered one of the standard keys because it is enharmonically equivalent to B major. With its tonic note being a white key on the piano, and its parallel minor (relative to E major) having 10 flats, its usage is generally undesirable. C♭ major does appear in Campagnoli's and Rinck's works mentioned below, along with A♯ minor, but those collections include both members of all six enharmonically equivalent pairs.
23	C♭ major	7 flats	
24	B minor	2 sharps	

=== Order of keys in published works ===
The circle of fifths, whereby each major key is followed by its relative minor key, and the sequence proceeds in fifths (C, a, G, e, D, b ...) is a commonly used schema. Angelo Michele Bartolotti used this approach as early as 1640, and it was also adopted by such later composers as Rode, Hummel, Chopin, Heller, Busoni, Scriabin, Shostakovich, Kabalevsky and Kapustin.

In J.S. Bach's The Well-Tempered Clavier and some other earlier sets, major keys were followed by their parallel minor keys, and the sequence ascends chromatically (C, c, C♯/D♭, c♯, D, d, ...). The Bach order was adopted by Arensky, Glière, York Bowen and others.

Other composers derived their own schemas based on certain logical rationales. For example, in Alkan’s 25 Preludes, Op. 31, the sequence of keys moves alternately up a fourth and down a third: the major keys take the odd-numbered positions in the cycle, proceeding chromatically upwards from C to C again, and each major key is followed by its subdominant minor.

Yet others used no systematic ordering. Palmgren, Rachmaninoff and Castelnuovo-Tedesco's works are examples of this.

== History ==
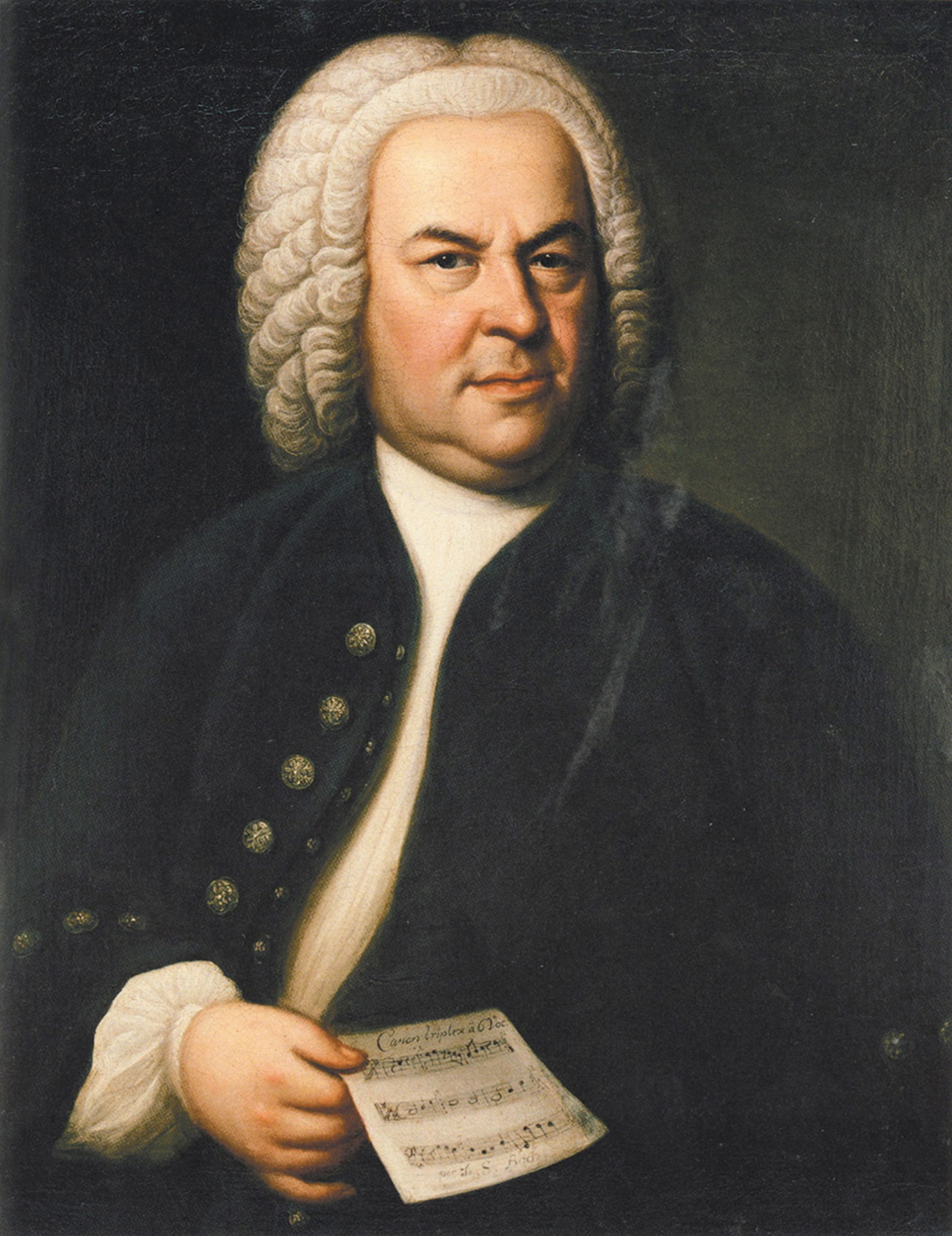
1748 portrait of J.S. Bach, who wrote The Well-Tempered Clavier

=== J.S. Bach and his precursors ===
Johann Sebastian Bach's The Well-Tempered Clavier, two complete sets of 24 Preludes and Fugues written for keyboard in 1722 and 1742, and often known as "the 48", is generally considered the greatest example of music traversing all 24 keys. Many later composers clearly modelled their sets on Bach's, including the order of the keys.

It was long believed that Bach had taken the title The Well-Tempered Clavier from a similarly named set of 24 Preludes and Fugues in all the keys, for which a manuscript dated 1689 was found in the library of the Brussels Conservatoire. It was later shown that this was the work of a composer who was not even born by 1689: Bernhard Christian Weber (1712–1758). In fact, the work was written in 1745–50 in imitation of Bach's example. While Bach can safely claim the title The Well-Tempered Clavier, he was not the earliest composer to write sets of pieces in all the keys:

As early as 1567, Giacomo Gorzanis (c.1520–c.1577) composed twelve settings of the passamezzo antico and passamezzo moderno, each followed by a saltarello, in all 24 keys. In 1584, Vincenzo Galilei, father of Galileo Galilei, wrote a Codex of pieces illustrating the use of all 24 major and minor keys.

In 1640, Angelo Michele Bartolotti wrote Libro primo di chitarra spagnola, a cycle of passacaglias that moves through all 24 major and minor keys according to the circle of fifths. Also in 1640, Antonio Carbonchi wrote Sonate di chitarra spagnola con intavolatura franzese for guitar.

In 1702, Johann Caspar Ferdinand Fischer wrote a cycle of 20 organ pieces all in different keys in his Ariadne musica. These included E major as well as E in Phrygian mode and again in Dorian mode, but not E minor per se. They also excluded C♯/D♭ major, D♯/E♭ minor, F♯/G♭ major, G♯/A♭ minor, and A♯/B♭ minor. J.S. Bach modelled the sequence of his 48 Preludes on Fischer's example.

In 1735, between J.S. Bach's two sets, Johann Christian Schickhardt wrote his L'alphabet de la musique, Op. 30, which contained 24 sonatas for flute, violin, or recorder in all keys. In 1749, the year before Bach's death, Johann Gottlieb Goldberg, the inspiration for J.S. Bach's Goldberg Variations, wrote his own 24 polonaises for keyboard, one in each of the major and minor keys. Other examples include works by John Wilson (1595–1674), Daniel Croner (1682), Christoph Graupner (1718), Johann Mattheson (1719), Friedrich Suppig (1722), and Johann David Heinichen (1683–1729).

=== After Bach ===
The following is an incomplete list of works of this type that have been written since the death of J.S. Bach.

Legend: AC = ascending chromatic; C5 = circle of fifths, major followed by relative minor; C5* = circle of fifths, major followed by parallel minor

==== 18th and 19th centuries ====
===== 1750–1850 =====
Composer	Work	Instrument	Date	Order	Comments
Adam Falckenhagen (d. 1761)	Preludio nel quale sono contenuti tutti i tuoni musicali (Prelude which contains all the musical tones)	lute	?		Random order
Tommaso Giordani	14 Preludes and 8 Cadenzas, Op. 33	harpsichord or pianoforte	1773		Originally published as "Preludes for the Harpsichord or Piano-Forte in All the Keys Flat and Sharp"
Étienne Ozi	Nouvelle méthode de basson	bassoon	1787		Also, for two bassoons; or bassoon and cello or double bass
Ludwig van Beethoven	2 Preludes through all 12 Major Keys, Op. 39	piano	1789		Prelude No. 1 includes both C♯ and D♭.
Ludwig van Beethoven	2 Preludes through all 12 Major Keys, Op. 39	piano	1789		Prelude No. 2 excludes C♯, but cycles through the other keys twice.
Pierre Gaviniès (d. 1800)	24 Matinées	violin	?		These include only 16 unique keys.
Johann Christian Kittel (d. 1809)	16 Preludes in all the keys	organ	?		These preludes span C to G, major and minor. Kittel evidently intended to write 24 preludes, in honour of his teacher J.S. Bach, but the work was left unfinished.
Joseph Aloys Schmittbaur	24 Vor- und Nachspiele für die Orgel	organ	1809		15 Preludes and 9 Postludes, in ascending chromatic order covering 15 unique keys; the E♭ prelude is described in the score as D♯.
Lev Gurilyov	24 Préludes et une Fugue	piano	pub. 1810	(Note: Arranged in a circle of fifths except with major keys preceding the minor keys: C, G, D, A etc.; a, e, b ... d.)	First mentioned in a MA thesis by Matthew J. Roy, 2012. Further comment on style and importance in an article by Wendelin Bitzan.
Muzio Clementi	Préludes et exercices dans tous les tons majeurs et mineurs, Op. 43	piano	1811	(Note: Préludes et exercices: C, a, F, d, G, e, B♭, g, D, b, E♭, c, A, f♯, A♭, f, E, c♯, D♭, b♭, B, g♯, F♯, e♭; Grande Exercice: C, a, F, d, B♭, g, E♭, c, A♭, f, D♭, b♭, G♭, e♭, B, g♯, E, c♯, A, f♯, D, b, G, e)	These were appended to the 5th edition of Clementi's Introduction to the Art of Playing on the Piano Forte. There is one prelude and exercise for each key, and the set concludes with a "Grande Exercice" that progressively modulates through all the keys but in a somewhat different order than the foregoing; further, the "Grande Exercice" uses G♭ major where the individual pieces use F♯ major.
Philip Seydler (1765–1819)	XXIV grands Caprices pour une Flûte	flute	1810–12	C5 (Note: Arranged in a circle of fifths, as alternating major and relative minor keys: C, a, G, e, D, b, A, f♯, E, c♯, B, g♯, F♯, e♭, D♭, b♭, A♭, f, E♭, c, B♭, g, F, d. Alexander Scriabin, Rodion Shchedrin and others chose G♭ over F♯.)	
Johann Nepomuk Hummel	24 Preludes, Op. 67	piano	1815	C5	The first such collection for keyboard in which the preludes are neither paired with fugues nor serve as an introduction to a suite. Some preludes are as short as five bars and unsuitable for concert performance.
Ferdinand Ries	40 Preludes, Op. 60	piano	1815	(Note: The distribution is: C major (4), C minor (2), D major (4), D minor (1), E♭ major (4), E major (3), E minor (1), F major (3), F minor (1), G major (4), G minor (1), A♭ major (2), A major (3), A minor (2), B♭ major (4), B minor (1).)	These 40 preludes cover most but not all possible keys.
Pierre Rode	24 Caprices en forme d'études	violin	pub. 1815	C5	
Friedrich Kalkbrenner	24 Etüden durch alle Tonarten, Op. 20	piano	1816	AC (Note: Ascending chromatic: C, c, C♯/D♭, c♯, D, d, E♭, d♯/e♭, E, e, F, f, F♯/G♭, f♯, G, g, A♭, g♯/a♭, A, a, B♭, b♭, B, b)	
Charles Chaulieu	24 petits préludes: dans les tons majeurs et mineurs, Op. 9	piano	1820		
Christian Heinrich Rinck	30 Préludes dans tous les tons majeurs et mineurs, Op. 55/37–66	organ	before 1821		The 30 Préludes for organ are part of Rinck's Practical Organ School, Op. 55, a collection of 117 pieces. They contain both members of all six enharmonically-equivalent key pairs, including the extremely rare keys of A♯ minor and C♭ major
Christian Heinrich Rinck	Exercices à deux parties dans tous les tons, Op. 67	piano	1821		
Ignaz Moscheles	Studien für das Pianoforte, zur höhern Vollendung bereits ausgebildeter Clavierspieler, bestehend aus 24 characteristischen Tonstücken, Op. 70	piano	1825–26		The A♭ minor étude is notated with a 4-flat key signature (ostensibly A♭ major) and uses accidentals to achieve the correct tonality.
Bartolomeo Campagnoli (d. 1827)	30 Preludes in 30 different keys	violin	?		These cover all 30 keys that use up to 7 sharps or 7 flats
Friedrich Kalkbrenner	24 Preludes, Op. 88	piano	1827	AC	
Joseph Christoph Kessler	24 Études, Op. 20	piano	1827		The 24 Études were dedicated to Hummel.
Carl Czerny	48 Etudes in the Form of Preludes, Op.161	piano	1829		In 2 books of 24 each; the first piece in Book 2 is written in C major in the RH and B major in the LH
Joseph Christoph Kessler	24 Preludes, Op. 31	piano	c. 1829	(Note: F♯, e, B♭, C, E♭, A♭, D♭, c, D, F, A [sic], d, f, A [sic], f♯, G, b, g, E, c♯, e♭, B, b♭, g♯)	The 24 Preludes were published in 1835 and dedicated to Chopin, who, a decade later, dedicated the German edition of his 24 Preludes, Op. 28 to Kessler.
Henri Herz	Exercices et préludes, Op. 21	piano	c. 1830		Dedicated to Hummel
Ignaz Moscheles	50 Preludes, Op. 73	piano	c. 1830		This set includes only one enharmonic pair: G♭/F♯ major. The keys of C♯ major, A♯ minor, D♯ minor, A♭ minor and C♭ major are not represented.
Johann Nepomuk Hummel	24 Études, Op. 125	piano	c. 1834	C5*	
Johann Heinrich Luft (1813–68)	24 Etudes	oboe or saxophone	1835		
Carl Czerny	Grand Exercise in All the Keys, major & minor, Op. 152	piano	?		
Carl Czerny	24 Grandes études caractéristiques, Op.692	piano	1836		These include only 15 unique keys
Carl Czerny	Grand Exercise in 3rds in all the 24 Keys, Op. 380	piano	1836		
Ernest Krähmer (d. 1837)	24 Solo Pieces in all major and minor keys	oboe, recorder, or other treble instruments	?		
Carl Czerny	The School of Fugue Playing, Op. 400	piano	1837		12 Fugues in different selected major and minor keys, in random order. Not included are C♯/c♯, E♭, F♯/f♯, G, A♭/a♭, A/a or B.
Louise Farrenc	30 Études dans tous les tons majeurs et mineurs, Op. 26	piano	1837–38	C5	No. 18 starts in D♭ but changes to f♯; No. 22 starts in f but changes to D♭; No. 24 changes from E♭ to e♭. This set, despite including 30 pieces, includes no enharmonic pairs at all. The versions of the six keys which have enharmonic pairs used are B, g♯, F♯, e♭, D♭, and b♭. The thirty pieces are filled out by duplicating six keys with fewer sharps or flats.
Adolf von Henselt	12 Etudes caractéristiques, Op. 2	piano	1838		These two sets collectively cover all 24 major and minor keys
Adolf von Henselt	12 Etudes de salon, Op. 5	piano	1838		These two sets collectively cover all 24 major and minor keys
Christian Heinrich Rinck	24 fugirte Orgelstücke, Op. 120	organ	1838		
Frédéric Chopin	24 Preludes, Op. 28	piano	1835–39	C5	Dedicated to Camille Pleyel (French edition) and Joseph Christoph Kessler (German edition)
Johann Baptist Cramer	Pensièri musicali: 24 preludes melodiques, ou, cadences, improvisations, et caprices, Op. 91	piano	1839		Only 22 different keys are covered in the original 24 preludes; in a later edition a further 12 preludes were added, for a total of 36.
Edouard Wolff	24 Études en forme de Préludes, Op. 20	piano	1839		
Ferdinand David	Bunte Reihe, Op. 30	violin and piano	c. 1840	AC	Published in 1851. The set was arranged by Franz Liszt for solo piano in 1850 (S. 484)
Alessandro Rolla (d. 1841)	24 Intonazioni	violin	?		
Johann Baptist Cramer	24 Préludes D'Utilité Générale et surtout à l'usage des Jeunes Eléves, Op. 96	piano	1841		These include only 15 unique keys
Pierre Baillot	24 Préludes dans tous les tons	violin	1842		
Stefano Golinelli	24 Preludes, Op. 23	piano	1845	C5	
Caspar Kummer	24 Études mélodiques, Op. 110	flute	1846	C5	Étude No. 13 is shown in 2 versions, F♯ major and G♭ major; No. 14 as D♯ minor and E♭ minor
Charles-Valentin Alkan	25 Preludes in all major and minor keys, Op. 31	piano	1847		Major keys ascending chromatically from C alternate with minor keys ascending chromatically from f. There is a final 25th Prayer in C major.
Peregrin Feigerl (1803–1877)	24 Etudes or Caprices	2 violins	1847	C5	
Charles-Valentin Alkan	12 Études in all the major keys, Op. 35	piano	1848		These were complemented by the 12 minor key études, Op. 39 (1857)

===== 1851–1900 =====
Composer	Work	Instrument	Date	Order	Comments
Anton Bernhard Fürstenau (d. 1852)	26 Uebungen (Exercises), Op.107	flute	?		
Franz Liszt	12 Transcendental Études, S. 139	piano	1826–52		These covered the neutral and flat keys only. Liszt originally planned to write the full suite of 24 études but apparently abandoned this plan. See Sergei Lyapunov below.
Carl Czerny	160 Kurze Übungen, Op. 821	piano	1852		No. 55-102 follow a sequence of major & minor keys listed in the row below.
Carl Czerny	160 Kurze Übungen, Op. 821 No. 55-102	piano	1852	(Note: C, a, F, d, B♭, g, E♭, c, A♭, f, D♭, b♭, G♭, e♭, B, g♯ (No. 85 is in a♭ minor rather than g♯ minor), E, c♯, A, f♯, D, b, G, e)	These 48 exercises cover the descending circle of 5ths with 1 etude of each major key, followed by 3 etudes of the relative minor. No. 85 is in A♭ minor rather than G♯ minor, while No. 84 & No. 86 are in G♯ minor.
Stefano Golinelli	24 Preludes, Op. 69	piano	1852	C5	
Casimir Ney	24 Preludes, Op. 22	viola	1849-53	C5	
William Sterndale Bennett	30 Preludes and Lessons, Op. 33	piano	1851–53		Includes major and minor keys with 7 sharps or flats: C♯ major, A♯ minor, C♭ major, A♭ minor.
Stephen Heller	24 Preludes, Op. 81	piano	1853	C5	
Carl Czerny	Nouveau Gradus ad Parnassum, 46 studies, Op. 822	piano	1853–54		These cover only 20 unique keys. Some studies consist of a prelude and fugue, usually in the same keys, except No. 4 (E and a), No. 14 (f and F), No. 17 (d and D), and No. 37 (B♭ and b♭). The final study is in the form of a theme and 34 variations.
Ferdinand Hiller	24 Esquisses et études rhythmiques, Op.56	piano	1854		
August Alexander Klengel	Les Avant-coureurs, 24 canons	piano	pub. posth. 1854	AC	This was either "patterned after Bach" or "a kind of preparation" for Bach's 48. After Klengel's death, Hauptmann edited and published Klengel's 48 Canons and Fugues, writing "he expressed his own thoughts in the way in which Bach would have done had he lived at the present day"
William Vincent Wallace	24 Preludes and Scales	piano	1855	C5*	
Charles-Valentin Alkan	12 Études in all the minor keys, Op. 39	piano	1857		These complete the sequence that was started with the 12 Études in all the major keys, Op. 35. Études 4–7 comprise the Symphony for Solo Piano, and Études 8–10 make up the Concerto for Solo Piano.
Carl Czerny	The Pianist in the Classical Style, 24 Preludes and Fugues, Op. 856	piano	1857		
Stanislas Verroust	24 Études mélodiques, Op. 65	oboe	1857		Covers 17 unique keys
Giuseppe Concone (1801–61)	24 Preludes, Op. 37	piano	?	(Note: C, a, F, d, B♭, g, E♭, c, A♭, f, D♭, b♭, G♭, e♭, B, a♭ (the prelude is headed "A♭ minor or G♯ minor"), E, c♯, A, f♯, D, b, G, e)	
Heinrich Wilhelm Stolze (1801–1868)	Die Wohltemperierte Orgel, 24 Preludes and Fugues, Op. 58	organ	1861	AC	The collection was published as part 4 of his organ method and is entitled The Well-Tempered Organ in reference to J.S. Bach.
Charles-Valentin Alkan	Esquisses, Op. 63, Books I & II	piano	1861		Covers all the major and minor keys twice, but in a different sequence, and ends with a final Laus Deo in C major.
Charles-Valentin Alkan	Esquisses, Op. 63, Books III & IV	piano	1861		Covers all the major and minor keys twice, but in a different sequence, and ends with a final Laus Deo in C major.
Vladimir Morkov (1801–1864)	Preludes in all 24 Major and Minor Tones	guitar	??	C5	
Jean-Delphin Alard	24 Études-Caprices, Op. 41	violin	1865	C5	
Adolf Jensen	25 Études, Op. 32	piano	1866	C5 + 1	This set employs the circle of fifths for the first 24 preludes, and concludes with an additional prelude in C major
Simon Sechter (d. 1867)	24 Preludes, Op. 26	piano	?		
Charles-Valentin Alkan	11 Grands préludes et 1 transcription du Messie de Hændel, Op.66	piano	1867		The set of 12 was not completed, an extraneous piece being inserted by the publishers, chosen for its key of e♭.
Paul Barbot (1828–1913)	L'art de préluder au piano: 72 préludes mélodiques dans tous les tons, Op. 94	piano	1868	C5	There are three preludes in each key, making 72 in all
Ferdinand David	Dur und Moll: 25 Etüden, Capricen und Charakterstücke in allen Tonarten, Op. 39	violin solo, or violin and piano	?	AC	
Désiré Magnus	24 Études de genre, Opp.161–162	piano	1874		
Carl Reinecke	24 Études, Op. 121	piano	1874		These include only 17 unique keys.
Désiré Magnus	24 Études mélodiques et de vélocité, Opp. 189–190	piano	1876		
Ferruccio Busoni	24 Preludes, Op. 37, BV. 181	piano	May 1881	C5	Busoni had just turned 15 when he wrote this work. It has been recorded by Daniele Petralia, Geoffrey Douglas Madge, Holger Groschopp and Trevor Barnard.
Adolf von Henselt	Préambules dans tous les tons	piano	1884		
Joachim Andersen	24 Etudes for flute, Op. 15	flute	1885	C5	No. 14 changes from d♯ to e♭.
Sebastian Lee	30 Präludien in allen Tonarten, Op. 122	cello	1885		There are 2 preludes for each key, except G and E♭ (3 each) and C (4), for a total of 30 preludes. Each of the 26 different keys is preceded by a scale.
Joachim Andersen	24 Etudes for flute, Op. 21	flute	1886	C5	
Richard Hofmann	32 Special-Etüden, Op. 52	piano	1886		
Joachim Andersen	24 Etudes for Flute, Op. 30	flute	1888	C5	
Joachim Andersen	24 Etudes for Flute, Op. 33	flute	1888	C5	
César Franck	L'Organiste, Vol. I, 63 pieces in 18 keys	harmonium or organ	1890 (pub. posth. 1896)	(Note: In 9 sections, of 7 pieces each: C and c; D♭ and c♯; D and d; E♭ and e♭; E and e; F and f; f♯ and G♭; G and g; A♭ and g♯)	59 pieces were originally published, with a further 4 being added in a later edition. Those 4 had remained in manuscript due to Franck's death while working on the composition. (A second set of 30 early pieces, L'Organiste, Vol. II was published in 1900, but these were collected from various unrelated manuscripts and do not cover the range of keys.)
Ignatius de Orellana	24 Melodic Studies	piano	1890		
Józef Wieniawski	24 Études de mécanisme et de style	piano	1890	C5	
Felix Blumenfeld	24 Preludes, Op. 17	piano	1892	C5	Modelled on Chopin's Op. 28 set. Philip Thomson made the world premiere recording in 1999
Emil Krause (1840–1916)	24 Praeludien und Cadenzen, Op. 71	piano	1892	C5	
José Antonio Santesteban	24 Preludes, Op. 84	piano	1892		
Johan Adam Krygell	Moll und Dur, 24 preludes and fugues	organ	1893		All minors then all majors; majors are in C5 order; minors are the respective parallel minor keys.
Anton Arensky	24 Morceaux caractéristiques, Op. 36	piano	1894	(Note: C, c, D♭, c♯ leading to D♭, D, d, E♭, e♭, E, e, F, f, F♯, f♯, G, g, A♭, g♯, A, a, B♭, b♭, B, b)	
Alexander Scriabin	24 Preludes, Op. 11	piano	1893–95	C5	Scriabin chose G♭ over F♯. He seems to have set out to write a further set of 24 preludes, and the 23 preludes of Opp. 13, 15, 16 and 17 (containing 6, 5, 5 and 7 preludes respectively) contain evidence of this, but he obviously moved away from his original idea as the key sequence breaks down.
Joachim Andersen	School of Virtuosity, 24 etudes, Op. 60	flute	1895	C5	
Max Reger	111 Canons in all major and minor tonalities: Book I: Two-Part Canons (63)	piano	1895		Book I: There are 2 successive canons for each key, except B and b (3 each), and f♯ (4). Also, e♭ appears in different places in the sequence, for a total of 4 canons.
Max Reger	111 Canons in all major and minor tonalities: Book II: Three-Part Canons (48)	piano	1895		Book II: There are 2 successive canons for each key, except b♭, e♭, a♭, D♭, F♯, G♭, C♯ and C♭ (1 each); and c and D (3 each). Also the order of g♯ and b is reversed between Books I and II.
Nikolay Tereshchenko (fl. 1898–1902)	24 Preludes, Op. 26	piano	c. 1898	C5	
August Winding (d. 1899)	Preludes in all the keys: A Cycle, Op. 26	piano	?		The work is in 25 parts: 24 preludes, ordered by ascending fourths (increasing flats, decreasing sharps), and a final Postludium in C major. It is dedicated to Isidor Seiss.
Richard Hofmann	50 leichte, melodische Studien in der ersten Lage u. in allen Tonarten, Op. 107	piano	1899		
Richard Hofmann	40 melodische Studien in allen Lagen u. Tonarten, Op. 108	piano	1899		

==== 20th century ====
===== 1901–1950 =====
Composer	Work	Instrument	Date	Order	Comments
Alexander Dorn (1833–1901)	24 Studies in the Different Major and Minor Keys, Op.100	piano	??	C5	
Josef Rheinberger (1839–1901)	20 sonatas	organ	1868–1901		Opp. 27, 65, 88, 98, 111, 119, 127, 132, 142, 146, 148, 154, 161, 165, 168, 175, 181, 188, 193, 196; Rheinberger set out to write 24 organ sonatas, one in each key. He completed 20 of these before his death in 1901.
César Cui	25 Preludes, Op. 64	piano	1903		Cui's order of keys is unique in that each major key is followed by the minor of its mediant (e.g. C major to E minor). It includes a 25th prelude in C major.
Émile Sauret	24 Etudes Caprices, Op. 64	violin	1903		
Sergei Lyapunov	12 Études d'exécution transcendante, Op. 11	piano	1897–1905		This set complements Franz Liszt's set of 12 Transcendental Études from 1826 to 1852 (which was written in neutral and flat keys only) by employing the remaining sharp keys. It is dedicated to Liszt's memory.
Franz Xaver Neruda	Praeludien und Fugen, Op.78	piano	1906		The set contains 12 pairs of preludes and fugues; 6 preludes in major keys are followed by fugues in their respective parallel minors, and vice-versa, making 24 keys in all
Jean-Henri Ravina (1818–1906)	100 Préludes dans tous les tons majeurs et mineurs, Op. 110	piano	?		
Reinhold Glière	25 Preludes, Op. 30	piano	1907	(Note: C, c, D♭, c♯, D, d, E♭, e♭, E, e, F, f, F♯, f♯, G, g, A♭, g♯, A, a, B♭, b♭, B, b, C; Alexander Wunderer and York Bowen chose G♭ over F♯.)	
Selim Palmgren	24 Preludes, Op. 17	piano	1907		
Emil Sjögren	Legends: Religious Moods (Swedish: Legender: religiösa stämningar) Op. 46	organ	1907		Based on fragments of his improvisations in St. John's Church, Stockholm.
Theobald Boehm	24 Etudes, Op. 37	flute	1908		
Richard Hofmann	Elementar-Studien für Violine, op. 129	violin	1909		
Ludvig Schytte	Melodische Vortragsstudien in allen Tonarten, Op. 159	piano	1909		
Hans Sitt	Dur und Moll: 28 leichte melodische Etüden für Violine (erste Lage) zur Befestigung der Intonation in allen Tonarten, Op. 107	violin	1909		
Marco Anzoletti	32 preludi per violino solo in tutte le tonalità	violin	1909		
Sergei Rachmaninoff	24 Preludes, Opp. 3/2, 23, 32	piano	1892–1910		The Prelude in C♯ minor, Op. 3/2, was part of a collection of pieces, and there is no evidence Rachmaninoff had at that stage planned to write 24 preludes traversing all the keys. Between 1901 and 1903, he wrote 10 Preludes, Op. 23, and in 1910, he completed the 24 with his 13 Preludes, Op. 32.
Semyon Barmotin	20 Preludes, Op, 12	piano	1910		Only 20 pieces were ever completed, covering 20 keys
Blas María de Colomer	24 Préludes mélodiques	piano	1910	C5	
Raoul Koczalski	24 Preludes, Op. 65	piano	1910	C5	
Hans Huber	24 Preludes and Fugues, Op. 100	piano 4-hands			Many sources inexplicably say there were only 12 pieces in the set, while at the same time listing 24
Lambert Adriaan van Tetterode (1858–1931)	24 Preludes, Op. 32	piano	1913	C5	
Louis Vierne	Vingt-quatre Pièces en style libre, Op. 31	organ	1913	AC	
Charles Koechlin	24 Esquisses, Op. 41	piano	1905–15		These cover only 13 unique keys; Nos. 15 and 22 are in indeterminate keys.
Frederick Septimus Kelly	24 Monographs, Op. 11	piano	1914–16		
Erkki Melartin	24 Preludes, Op. 85	piano	1916		
Georg Schumann	Durch Dur und Moll, Op. 61	piano	1916	AC	
Jan Skrzydlewski (1867–1943)	24 Preludes	piano	? 1917		No. 16 is written without a key signature.
Walter Niemann	24 Preludes, Op. 55	piano	1918	C5	
Charles Villiers Stanford	24 Preludes, Set I, Op. 163	piano	1918	AC	Set I has been recorded by Peter Jacobs.
Charles Villiers Stanford	24 Preludes, Set II, Op. 179	piano	1920	AC	Set II was completed in December 1920, not in 1921 as many sources report.
Aurelio Giorni	24 Concert Études	piano	1923	C5	No. 22 in G minor is for right hand alone.
Paul Taffanel	24 Progressive Exercises	flute	1923		Left unfinished by Taffanel; completed and revised by Philippe Gaubert
Robert Casadesus	24 Preludes	piano	1924		
Alexander Wunderer	24 Etüden in allen Tonarten	oboe	pub. 1924	AC	The 11th Etüde bears a striking similarity to the 11th variation of Nikolai Rimsky-Korsakov's Variations on a Theme of Glinka, for oboe and military band.
Mieczysław Surzyński (1866–1925)	55 Easy Preludes, Op. 20	piano or organ	?		A collection of 55 pieces in all keys, in groups of 2 or 3 in each key; they have titles such as Moderato, Sostenuto, Andante, Allegretto, Lento etc.
Gustav Hanns Strümpel (1855–1927)	24 Preludes, Op. 16	piano	?		
Samuel Maykapar	Biriulki (Spillikins), 26 pieces, Op. 28	piano	1926		Cycle of 26 children pieces (with program titles) in all 24 major and minor keys (including two each in C major and A minor)
Louis Vierne	Pièces de fantaisie, 4 books, Opp. 51, 53–55	organ	1926–27		Random order
Abram Chasins	24 Preludes, 4 Books, Opp. 10–13	piano	1927	C5	C5 but pairs of keys alternate between major/minor and minor/major
Luigi Perrachio	25 Preludes	piano	1929		
Manuel Ponce	24 Preludes	guitar	c. 1929		Twelve of these were published by Andrés Segovia in 1930, but the remainder had to wait for the guitarist Miguel Alcazar to reconstruct them from Ponce's manuscripts before being published in 1981.
François Demierre (1893–1976)	24 Préludes dans tous les tons majeurs et mineurs	piano	1932		Swiss-French organist and teacher; his first wife was the sister of Ernest Ansermet.
Aleksandr Goldenweiser	Contrapuntal Sketches, Op. 12	piano	1932	AC	
Dmitri Shostakovich	24 Preludes, Op. 34	piano	1932–33	C5	See also 24 Preludes and Fugues, Op. 87 (1950–51).
Ivan Wyschnegradsky	24 Préludes dans tous les tons de l'échelle chromatique diatonisée à 13 sons Op. 22	2 pianos in quarter tones	1934 (revised 1960)		Ed. Belaieff. In 13-tone diatonicised chromaticism
Valery Zhelobinsky	24 Preludes, Op. 20	piano	1934	AC	Prelude No. 22, although it is effectively in B♭ minor, has a key signature with 6 flats, as if it were written in E♭ minor (like Prelude No. 8). Most C naturals in this prelude are arrived at via the use of accidentals, while C♭, which would have required accidentals had the true key signature with only 5 flats been used, requires no alteration.
Vsevolod Zaderatsky	24 Preludes	piano	1934		
Boris Goltz	24 Preludes, Op. 2	piano	1934–35	C5	
Charles Koechlin	Fifteen Vocalises in all major keys, Op. 152	voice and piano	Aug–Sep 1935		
Charles Koechlin	Fifteen Vocalises in all minor keys, Op. 154	voice and piano	Oct. 1935		
Viktor Kosenko	Twenty-four Pieces for Children, Op. 25	Piano	1936	C5	Erroneously published in 1938 as Op. 15, but later corrected by Musichna Ukraina.
Algernon Ashton (1859–1937)	24 string quartets	string quartet	?		The set was lost, possibly destroyed in WWII bombing. Ashton also wrote 8 piano sonatas, all in different keys, and it may be that he planned to complete a cycle of 24 of them as well. One source says he wrote 24 Preludes and Fugues, but this is not corroborated.
Vsevolod Zaderatsky	24 Preludes and Fugues	piano	1937–38		
Leonid Polovinkin (1894–1949)	24 Postludes	piano	1938		Increasing flats, decreasing sharps, a/C separated
Samuel Maykapar	Miniatures, 24 pieces, Op. 36	piano	?		Published posthumously; 12 keys in ascending sharps are followed by 12 in ascending flats, except that G♭ major (6 flats) is replaced by F♯ major (6 sharps)
Božidar Širola	24 Two Part Inventions in all major and minor keys	piano	1939		
Roger Sacheverell Coke	24 Preludes, Op. 33 and Op. 34	piano	1938–41	C5	Two sets, Op. 33 containing eleven, and Op. 34 thirteen.
David Diamond	52 Preludes and Fugues	piano	1939–42		The first recording that Leonard Bernstein ever made included one pair (the Prelude and Fugue No. 3 in C♯ major).
Joseph Jongen	Vingt-quatre petits préludes pour piano dans tous les tons, Op. 116	piano	1941		At least some of them exist in a version for organ.
Paul Hindemith	Ludus Tonalis, 25 movements	piano	1942		The work consists of a prelude, 11 interludes, and a postlude, each separated by a fugue. The keys are not differentiated into major and minor.
Dmitry Kabalevsky	24 Preludes, Op. 38	piano	1943–44	C5	
Akio Yashiro (1929–76)	24 Preludes	piano	1945	C5	
Julius Weismann	Der Fugenbaum (The Fugue Tree), 24 Preludes and Fugues in all the keys, Op. 150	piano	1946	AC	
Matvei Gozenpud (1903–61)	24 Preludes, Op. 53	piano	1947	C5	
Craig Sellar Lang	A miniature 48; two books of short preludes & fugues in all keys, Op. 64	piano	1949		
York Bowen	24 Preludes in all Major and Minor Keys, Op.102	piano	1938–50	AC	

===== 1951–2000 =====
Composer	Work	Instrument	Date	Order	Comments
Dmitri Shostakovich	24 Preludes and Fugues, Op. 87	piano	1950–51	C5	See also 24 Preludes, Op. 34 (1932–33). In both these cases, Shostakovich adhered to Chopin's order of keys, although he was greatly influenced by J.S. Bach's The Well-Tempered Clavier and even quoted parts of that work in Op. 87.
Richard Flury	24 Preludes	piano	1952		First performance Eugen Huber, 15 March 1956 in Solothurn.
Tatiana Nikolayeva	24 Concert Etudes, Op. 13	piano	1951-53		Nikolayeva was the dedicatee and first performer of Shostakovich's 24 Preludes and Fugues, Op. 87 of 1950-51
Marcel Dupré	24 Inventions, Op. 50	organ	1956		
Edvard Baghdasaryan	24 Preludes	piano	1951–58	C5	aka Eduard Bagdasarian, Baghdasarian;
William Gillock	24 Lyric Preludes in Romantic Style	piano	1958		Short pedagogical pieces
Franciszek Zachara	New Well-Tempered Clavicord for the Piano	piano	1950s		24 sets of preludes and fugues in all major and minor keys, with an additional 25th prelude and fugue (on a theme from Ernő Dohnányi) added at the end.
Franciszek Zachara	Twenty-Four Etudes in All Keys	piano	1950s		
Franciszek Zachara	Twelve Master Etudes in Minor Keys, Op. 29	piano	1950s		
Franciszek Zachara	Twenty-Four Variations on the Theme "Happy Birthday"	2 pianos	1950s		
Hans Gál	24 Preludes, Op. 83	piano	1959–60		Major/parallel minor pairs, random order. Written during a fortnight's hospital stay, as a birthday present to himself; FP October 1960, composer, Edinburgh Society of Musicians.
Nikolai Rakov	24 children's pieces in all keys	piano	1961		
Mario Castelnuovo-Tedesco	Les Guitares bien tempérées (The Well-Tempered Guitars), 24 préludes et fugues, Op. 199	2 guitars	1962		Described as "the longest and most important cycle of works for two guitars ever composed", the 200-page score was written between 8 March and 3 June 1962, in response to performances by the popular husband-wife duo Ida Presti and Alexandre Lagoya
Gara Garayev	24 Preludes	piano	1951–63	C5*	
Gunnar de Frumerie	Circulus Quintus Op. 62, 24 piano pieces	piano	1965		Some have names which suggest the character of the piece such as "Siciliano", "Tarantella", or "Gavotte". As in the case of Emil Sjögren's Legends for organ, the collection is divided in two volumes, where the first has the pieces ordered in a perfect half-circle of fifths from C major to G♯ minor, and the second volume is ordered in a half-circle of fifths backwards, i.e. starting with F major and ending with E♭ minor.
Isaak Berkovich	24 Preludes, Op, 46	piano	1965-68	C5	
Aleksandr Kasyanov	24 Preludes	piano	1968	C5	
Richard Cumming (1928–2009)	24 Preludes	piano	1966–69		Commissioned by John Browning, who stipulated they should be "as hard as possible", gave the world premiere in 1969 and recorded them
Rodion Shchedrin	24 Preludes and Fugues, in 2 volumes	piano	1964–70	C5	Shchedrin premiered Vol. I in Moscow in 1965 and the complete cycle in 1971. Dedicated to the memory of his father.
Viktor Poltoratsky	24 Preludes and Fugues	piano	1967–71	C5	
Sulkhan Tsintsadze	24 Preludes	piano	1971	C5	
Eduard Abramian (1923–1986)	24 Preludes	piano	1952–72		d and e♭ occur twice each; D and a are not represented.
Balys Dvarionas (d. 1972)	24 Preludes	piano	?	AC	
Dmitri Shostakovich	15 string quartets	string quartet	1938–74		Shostakovich planned to write 24 string quartets, one each in a different key, but completed only 15 before his death.
Nikolai Silvansky	24 Preludes	piano	1966-74	C5	
Georgy Mushel (d. 1989)	24 Preludes and Fugues	piano	1975		
Alan Bush	24 Preludes, Op. 84	piano	1977		Composer gave the first performance at the Wigmore Hall on 30 October 1977.
Valentin Bibik	34 Preludes and Fugues in 3 Books	piano	1973–78		Book I: 14 major and minor keys on the white notes; Book II: 10 sharp keys; Book III: 10 flat keys
Yevgeny Svetlanov	12 Preludes	piano	1978		12 selected major and minor keys, in random order
Sembiin Gonchigsumlaa	24 Preludes	piano	1978–79	C5	
Yasushi Akutagawa	24 Preludes: The Piano Pieces for Children	piano	1979	C5*	
Hans Gál	24 Fugues, Op. 108	piano	1979–80	AC	Written as a 90th birthday present to himself.
Hiroshi Hara (1933–2002)	24 Preludes & Fugues	piano	1981		
Jaan Rääts	24 Marginalia, Op. 68	2 pianos	1982		
Alexander Iakovtchouk (b. 1952)	24 Preludes and Fugues	piano	1983		or Alexander Yakovchuk
John McLeod (b. 1934)	Twelve Preludes	piano	1984		Cycle of Preludes related by key. Commissioned by Richard Orlando Thompson. Premiered 30 September 1984, Purcell Room, London
Anthony Burgess	The Bad-Tempered Electronic Keyboard	piano	Nov–Dec 1985		24 preludes and fugues + a closing "Finale: Natale", written for the 300th anniversary of the birth of J.S Bach 12 major keys ascending chromatically are followed by the 12 minor keys in the same order.
Geoff Cummings-Knight (b. 1947)	24 Preludes	piano	1985		Published by Roberton Publications in 1987. Premiered at the British Music Information Centre, London, 29 October 1991.
Dave Smith (b. 1949)	First Piano Concert (24 sonatas in all the keys)	piano	1985–86		
Nikolai Kapustin	24 Preludes in Jazz Style, Op. 53	piano	1988	C5	
Jaan Rääts	24 Estonian Preludes, Op. 80	piano	1988		
Igor Rekhin (b. 1941)	24 Preludes and Fugues	guitar	1985–90	AC	
David Cope	The Well-Tempered Disklavier, 48 preludes and fugues	piano	1991		
Igor Rekhin (b. 1941)	24 Caprices	cello	1991	AC	
Sulkhan Tsintsadze (d. 1991)	24 Preludes	cello & piano	??	C5	
David Earl	Oxymorons - 24 Preludes (1993)	piano	1993	C5	The title indicates the tonal nature of the Preludes in a climate where "tonal" was considered outmoded. Recorded by Earl on SOMMCD 0728 (2026)
John Gardner	Homage to Schubert - 24 Laendler, Op. 206	piano	1993		
Sergei Slonimsky	24 Preludes and Fugues	piano	1994	AC	Inspired to create this cycle after listening to Glenn Gould's recording of The Well-Tempered Clavier on New Year's Eve, 1993. The cycle was dedicated to the memory of A. N. Dolzhansky. It follows J.S. Bach's key organization, ascending in chromatic order from C major to B minor.
Trygve Madsen	24 Preludes and Fugues, Op. 101	piano	1995–96		
Howard Blake	Lifestyle, Op. 489: 24 pieces	Piano	1996	(Note: The keys are arranged in a sequence of falling fifths, starting with B minor and ending in F♯ major)	Minor/parallel major pairs, descending sharps, ascending flats, descending sharps.
Nikolai Kapustin	24 Preludes and Fugues, Op. 82	piano	1997		The major keys tour the circle of fifths in the flat direction (beginning with C major and ending with G major), while the minor keys tour in the same mode but begin at the other side of the circle (starting with G♯ minor and ending with E♭ minor). This has the effect of juxtaposing very unrelated keys, and spacing relative majors and minors as far apart from one another as possible.
Ron Weidberg (b. 1953)	Voyage to the End of the Millennium: 24 Preludes and Fugues	piano	1997–98		
Lera Auerbach	24 Preludes, Op. 41	piano	1999	C5	No. 13 in F♯ in the 24 Preludes for piano, Op. 41, is written in 5 sharps, with accidentals used to achieve the desired tonality.
Lera Auerbach	24 Preludes, Op. 46	violin and piano	1999	C5	No. 13 in F♯ in the 24 Preludes for piano, Op. 41, is written in 5 sharps, with accidentals used to achieve the desired tonality.
Lera Auerbach	24 Preludes, Op. 47	cello and piano	1999	C5	No. 13 in F♯ in the 24 Preludes for piano, Op. 41, is written in 5 sharps, with accidentals used to achieve the desired tonality.
Niels Viggo Bentzon (d. 2000)	Det temperede klaver, 14 sets each containing 24 Preludes and Fugues	piano	?		Opp. 157, 379, 400, 409, 428, 470, 530, 532, 541, 542, 546, 554, 633, 638
Dmitri Smirnov	The Well-Tempered Piano	piano	1968–2000		Major keys ascending chromatically from C alternate with minor keys descending chromatically from b.
Henry Martin (b. 1950)	24 Preludes and Fugues	piano	1990–2000	AC	
John Ramsden Williamson (1929–2015)	Palindromic Preludes (at least 8 sets of 12), New Preludes	piano	1993–2000		These sets generally consist of 12 major or minor keys
Alexander Mekaev (b. 1960)	24 Preludes, Op. 41	piano	??	C5	
Mikhail Alekseyev (b. 1965)	26 Preludes	piano	2000		D and B♭ appear twice each
Roberto Novegno (b. 1981)	Preludes I, tbp 43	piano	2000	C5	
Roberto Novegno (b. 1981)	Preludes II, tbp 46	piano	2000		

==== 21st century ====
Composer	Work	Instrument	Date	Order	Comments
Roberto Novegno (b. 1981)	Preludes III, tbp 53	piano	2000–01		
Roberto Novegno (b. 1981)	Preludes IV, tbp 60	piano	2001–02		
Daniel Padrón (b. 1966)	24 Nocturnes	piano	c. 2002		
Anthony Ritchie (b. 1960)	24 Preludes	piano	2002		Uses the mathematical concept of the magic square
Roberto Novegno (b. 1981)	Preludes V, tbp 62	piano	2002–03		
Rob Peters (b. 1969)	24 Preludes, Op. 119	organ	2003		Increasing flats, decreasing sharps
Roberto Novegno (b. 1981)	Preludes VI, tbp 65	piano	2003–04		
Wim Zwaag (b. 1960)	24 Preludes	piano	2004		Premiered in April 2007 by Paul Komen at the Bethaniënklooster, Amsterdam
Edward Cowie	24 Preludes	piano	2004–2005	C5*	Vol 1 – Book 1 (Water); Book 2 (Air); Vol 2 – Book 3 (Earth); Book 4 (Fire). Cowie uses a♭ rather than g♯.
German Dzhaparidze (b. 1939)	24 Peludes and Fugues	guitar	1980s-2006	AC	
Jeroen van Veen	24 Minimal Preludes, 2 Books	piano	1999–2006	C5	Book I, 1999–2003; Book II, 2004–06
Daniel Léo Simpson	24 Inventions	piano	1977–2008		
Marc-André Hamelin	Twelve Etudes in All the Minor Keys	piano	1986–2008		Each etude has a title. They are laid out in four groups of three keys following the ascending circle of fifths separated by a minor third.
Roberto Novegno (b. 1981)	Preludes VII, tbp 73	piano	2004–08		
Mark Alburger	Standards: 24 Preludes and Fugues, Op. 162	piano	2008	AC	
Roberto Novegno (b. 1981)	Preludes VIII, tbp 85	piano	2009	AC	
Roberto Novegno (b. 1981)	Preludes IX, tbp 88	piano	2009		
Roberto Novegno (b. 1981)	Preludes X, tbp 94	piano	2009		
Roberto Novegno (b. 1981)	Preludes XI, tbp 98	piano	2009–10		
Francis Routh	The Well-Tempered Pianist, Op. 77	piano	2009–2010		These 24 Preludes are based on a seven-note scale consisting of the six notes of the whole–tone scale with the addition of the perfect fourth The sequence includes preludes in D♯, G♯ and A♯, which are normally considered theoretical keys as their key signatures include double sharps.
Michelle Gorrell	Well-Tempered Licks & Grooves: 24 Preludes & Fugues in Jazz Styles	piano	2010		
Leslie Howard	24 Classical Preludes for Piano, Op. 25	piano	?		Each prelude is written in the style of a different composer
Roberto Novegno (b. 1981)	Preludes XII, tbp 102	piano	2010		
Roberto Novegno (b. 1981)	Preludes XIII, tbp 130	piano	2011		
Rob Peters (b. 1969)	24 Preludes a danser, Op. 211	piano	2011		Major keys ascending chromatically from C alternate with minor keys ascending chromatically from f.
George N. Gianopoulos	24 Chorale Preludes, Op. 6	piano	2006–12	AC	
Geert Van Hoorick (b. 1968)	24 Preludes, Op. 39	piano	2010–12	C5	
Shuwen Zhang (b. 1991)	The 24 Chinese Solar Terms	piano or harpsichord	2011–2012	AC	
Lawrence Chandler	The Tuning of the World	string quartet	2012		
Steven O'Brien	24 Preludes, Op. 2	piano	2012	C5	
Colin Peter Snuggs (b. 1977)	24 Preludes, Op. 2	piano	2012–13		Covers 16 unique keys. He has also written at least 18 études in different keys.
Aaron Andrew Hunt (b. 1972)	24 Preludes and Fugues, Set I	piano	2003–14	AC	
Michael Brough (b. 1960)	25 Picture-Preludes for Piano, Op. 19	piano	2013–14		Major/relative minor pairs, order variable, random sequence; No. 13 is specified as "no key"; 24 in b♭ is for left hand.
John Burge	24 Preludes	piano	2011–15	C5	
Roberto Novegno (b. 1981)	Preludes XIV, tbp 140	piano	2012–15		
Ilia Lushpa (b, 1991)	24 Preludes	piano	2015		
Shuwen Zhang (b. 1991)	Variations on 3 Themes through 24 Keys	piano	2015		The work includes variations on themes by Monteverdi, Schubert and Cherubini
Jason L. Pachman (b. 1971)	24 Preludes	piano	2015–17	C5	
Felipe Brandes (b. 2000)	24 Preludes, Op. 34	piano	2017	C5	
Mark Phillips	24 Preludes for Piano in All Major and Minor Keys: In the Style of Bach's "Prelude in C Major" from The Well-Tempered Clavier	piano	2017		
Stéphane Delplace	Préludes et Fugues dans les Trente Tonalités, 3 Books	piano	1994–2018	(Book I)	Major/relative minor pairs, ascending in steps of 1 or 4 semitones (14141411414141)
Christopher Brown	24 Preludes and Fugues, Op. 98	piano	2011-19, pub. 2020		Four books (each of 6 Preludes and Fugues) based around one of the notes of the name B A C H (B♭, A C and B natural in German), and starting and ending in the major or minor tonality of the 4 keys.
Michel Rondeau	24 Fughettas	2 flugelhorns & bass trombone	2019		
Howard Skempton	24 Preludes and Fugues	piano	2019		Preludes are all canons. In the first 12, each major key is followed by the minor key of the next note (C, c♯, D, e♭ ...). For the remainder, minor keys are followed by the major key of the next note (c, C♯, d, E♭ ...)
Agnes W. Ascher (b. 1980)	Escapes/Fugitives from Everyday-life: 24 Well-tempered Counterpoint, Taken from Life, Composed and Made for Special Diversion, Op. 2	piano(s)	2019–20	AC	Fugues and fugal movements over everyday life melodies (from ringtones and children's songs to popular, film, tv and classical music; simple, double, triple and quadrupel fugues; multithematic fantasies)
Aaron Andrew Hunt (b. 1972)	24 Preludes and Fugues, Set II	piano	2019–20	AC	
Keith Eisenbrey (b. 1959)	24 Preludes	piano	2011–21	C5	
Albert Guinovart	24 Preludes	piano	2021		Descending chromatic pairs of unrelated major and minor keys starting at B/f
Kirill Monorosi	24 Etudes, Op. 1	piano	2021	AC	
Andrzej Chmielewski (b. 1990)	24 Preludes	piano	2009–22	C5	
Daniel Léo Simpson	24 Preludes and Fugues	piano	2017–22		As of 2022, only 13 of the 24 pieces had been published
Nicholas Scott-Burt (b. 1962)	24 Preludes for Piano	piano	2019–20		Alternative major and minor, up a tone, down a semitone
Hayden Roberts (b. 2004)	Anthony's Book: 24 Preludes and 24 Scherzos	piano	2019–22	AC	
Howard Skempton	50 Preludes for Organ, books 1 and 2	piano	2022–23	AC	
Natanel Grinshtein	Preludes for Piano (24)	piano	2023-25		
Dennis Alexander (b. 1947)	24 Character Preludes	piano	??		
Ken Hatfield	Etudes in 24 Keys	guitar	??		
Victor Labenske	Piano Miniatures: 24 Short Solos	piano	??		

== See also ==
- Pangram - A sentence in which all letters of an alphabet appear at least once (e.g. "The quick brown fox jumps over the lazy dog" in English)
