= Prelude in C-sharp minor =

Prelude in C-sharp minor may refer to:

- Prelude in C-sharp minor (Rachmaninoff) by Sergei Rachmaninoff
- Prelude in C-sharp minor, Op. 11, No. 10 (Scriabin) by Alexander Scriabin
- Prelude in C-sharp minor, see Preludes (Chopin) Op. 28 No. 10
- Prelude in C-sharp minor, see 24 Preludes, Op. 34 (Shostakovich)

== See also ==
- Prelude in C (disambiguation)
