= Preludes (Rachmaninoff) =

Classical pieces for solo piano

Sergei Rachmaninoff wrote a number of preludes, all for solo piano. His most important works in this genre are the 24 preludes that cover all 24 major and minor keys. Unlike similar collections belonging to earlier composers, these were written and published at different times, rather than as a unified set. Of all the composers who wrote sets of 24 pieces in all the keys, Rachmaninoff seems to be the only one who did not originally set out with such a goal in mind. There is not an order to the tonalities of the preludes, like that seen in Bach or Chopin's preludes (in which the keys were organized chromatically and around the circle of fifths, respectively.) Rachmaninoff also wrote three other individual preludes.

== History ==
=== First attempts ===
Rachmaninoff's first known composition to be designated a "prelude" was a piece in the key of E♭ minor, one of the Four Pieces for piano solo dating from 1887. In July 1891, he wrote a Prelude in F major for piano solo, which he later arranged for cello and piano. Neither of these was published in his lifetime.

=== Prelude in C♯ minor, Op. 3 ===
In 1892, Rachmaninoff published his Op. 3, consisting of five assorted piano pieces under the collective title Morceaux de fantaisie. The second piece in the set was the Prelude in C♯ minor, which became a massive popular "hit" - so much so that the composer came to dislike the piece, and to refer to it as his "Frankenstein" (alluding to a creation that got out of control).

Prelude in E-flat Major, Op. 23, No. 6
Performed by Giorgi Latso in Beverly Hills, CA. Live recording 04.13.2019

Prelude in G Sharp Minor, Op. 32, No. 12
Performed by Giorgi Latso in Beverly Hills, CA. Live recording 04.13.2019

=== 10 Preludes, Op. 23 ===
In 1901, Rachmaninoff wrote his Prelude in G minor. This was not published until he had completed nine more preludes in 1903, the set of 10 becoming his Op. 23. These were all in different keys, none of which was C♯ minor, but it is not known whether he fully intended by this time to eventually complete the full complement of 24 preludes in different keys, to emulate earlier examples by Bach, Chopin, Alkan, Scriabin and others. There is nothing to suggest this intention from the order of the keys:

F♯ minor, B♭ major, D minor, D major, G minor, E♭ major, C minor, A♭ major, E♭ minor, and G♭ major

In this set, there are three pairs of parallel keys (D, E♭, and F♯/G♭ minor/major) and three pairs of relative keys (B♭ major/G minor, E♭ major/C minor, and E♭ minor/G♭ major), the remaining prelude (A♭ major) satisfying neither criterion. However, by choosing 11 different keys for his first 11 published preludes, he was at least keeping his options open.

=== 13 Preludes, Op. 32 ===
By 1910 Rachmaninoff had definitely decided to complete the set of 24, publishing 13 preludes, Op. 32, covering the remaining 13 keys:

C major, B♭ minor, E major, E minor, G major, F minor, F major, A minor, A major, B minor, B major, G♯ minor, and D♭ major

This set contains four pairs of parallel keys (E, F, A, and B major/minor) and four pairs of relative keys (B major/G♯ minor, C major/A minor, E minor/G major, and B♭ minor/D♭ major).

== Recordings ==
Rachmaninoff's 24 published preludes of Op. 3, 23, and 32 have most often been recorded as a unified set of 24. He himself was somewhat more diffident: he recorded much of his own music, but only eight of the 24 preludes (C♯ minor, G minor, G♭ major, E major, G major, F minor, F major, G♯ minor); and he never performed more than four preludes in any single concert. However, it was in keeping with the practice of the times to play selected pieces rather than entire lengthy works.

The complete 24 Preludes have been recorded by Ruth Laredo, Vladimir Ashkenazy, Nikolai Lugansky, Sergio Fiorentino, Rustem Hayroudinoff, Dame Moura Lympany, Steven Osborne, Michael Ponti, Valentina Lisitsa, Alexis Weissenberg and others. Hayroudinoff's Complete Preludes (Chandos Records) was selected by Classic FM Magazine as part of the ‘four discs essential Rachmaninoff collection’.
