= Preludes, Op. 32 (Rachmaninoff) =

Set of piano pieces by Sergei Rachmaninoff

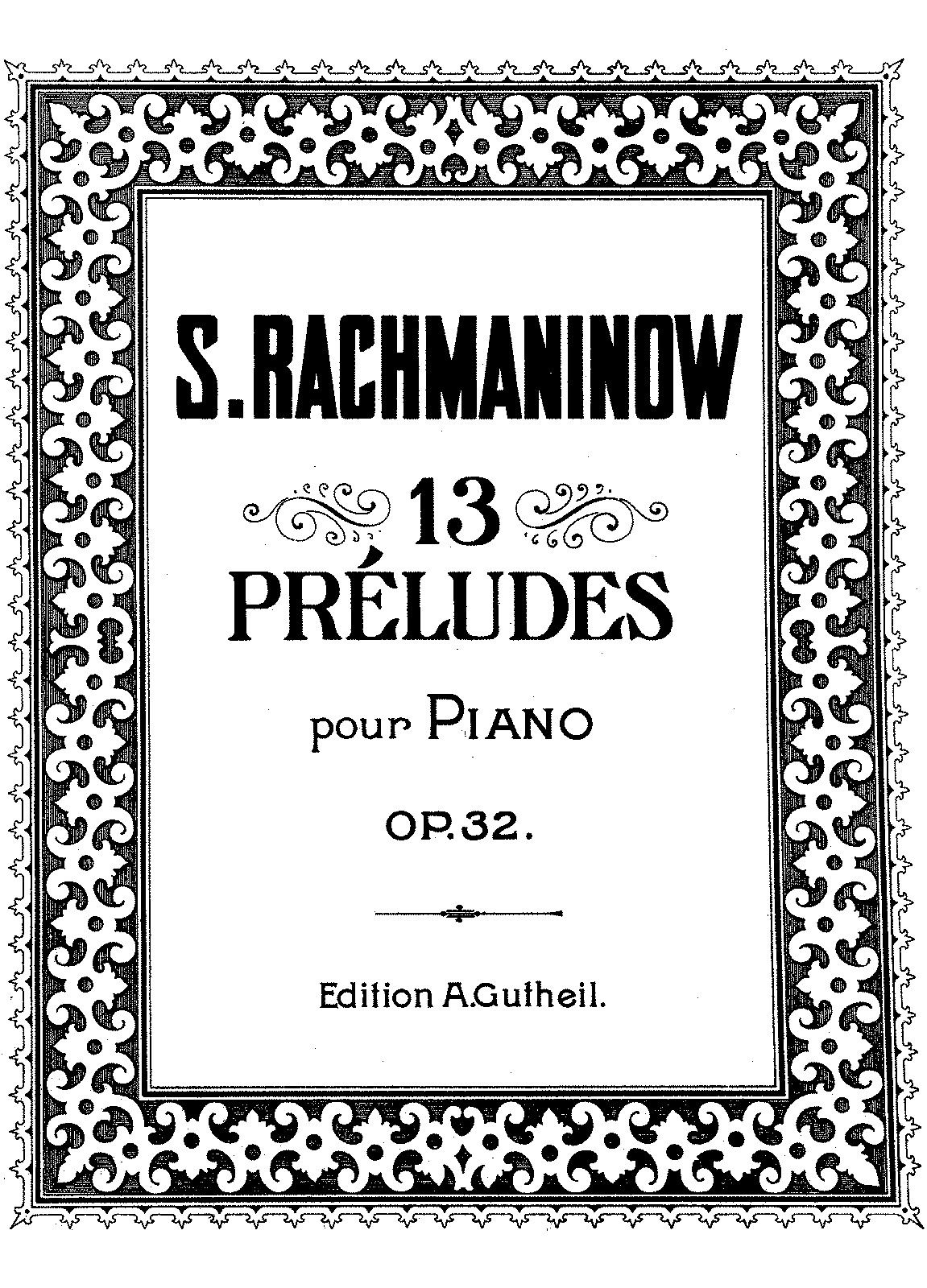
Cover of the first edition (A. Gutheil, 1911)

Thirteen Preludes (Russian: Тринадцать прелюдий, Trinadtsat' prelyudiy), Op. 32, is a set of thirteen preludes for solo piano, composed by Sergei Rachmaninoff in 1910. It complements his earlier Prelude in C♯ minor, Op. 3/2, and 10 Preludes, Op. 23, to complete the full set of 24 Preludes in all 24 major and minor keys.

== Pieces ==
Prelude in G♯ minor, Op. 32, No. 12 (2:41)
Performed in 2013 by Barbara Semenchuk

Opus 32 contains 13 preludes:

- No. 1 in C major (Allegro vivace)
- No. 2 in B♭ minor (Allegretto)
- No. 3 in E major (Allegro vivace)
- No. 4 in E minor (Allegro con brio)
- No. 5 in G major (Moderato)
- No. 6 in F minor (Allegro appassionato)
- No. 7 in F major (Moderato)
- No. 8 in A minor (Vivo)
- No. 9 in A major (Allegro moderato)
- No. 10 in B minor (Lento)
- No. 11 in B major (Allegretto)
- No. 12 in G♯ minor (Allegro)
- No. 13 in D♭ major (Grave – Allegro)

== Prelude No. 10 ==
Prelude in B minor, Op. 32, No. 10
Performed in 2010, this is the tenth prelude of this opus (5:21)

Prelude in B minor, Op. 32, No. 10, was written in 1910 along with the other twelve pieces. Rachmaninoff was inspired by Arnold Böcklin's painting "Die Heimkehr" ("The Homecoming" or "The Return"). Rachmaninoff also stated to pianist Benno Moiseiwitsch that this was his personal favourite among his preludes. This is the second work of Rachmaninoff's to be inspired by one of Böcklin's paintings; the other being Isle of the Dead.

== See also ==
- Preludes (Rachmaninoff)
- Music written in all major and/or minor keys

== Sources ==
- Baylor, Murray, Rachmaninoff 13 Preludes, Opus 32, For the Piano, Pg. 5. Alfred Music Publishing, New York,1988.
- Brennan, Gerald, Schrott, Allen, Woodstra, Chris, All Music Guide to Classical Music: The Definitive Guide to Classical Music, Backbeat Books, California, 2005
