= 24 Caprices =

24 Caprices may refer to:

- 24 Caprices for Solo Violin (Paganini), by Niccolò Paganini
- 24 Caprices for Violin (Rode), by Pierre Rode
