= Prelude in C major =

Prelude in C major may refer to:

- Prelude in C major, Op. 11, No. 1, by Alexander Scriabin
- Prelude in C major, by Johann Sebastian Bach, from the Prelude and Fugue in C major, BWV 846, from Book I of The Well-Tempered Clavier

== See also ==
- Prelude in C (disambiguation)
