= Tuba Tune =

Tuba Tune can refer to:

- Tuba Tune (1922), a composition for organ by Norman Cocker
- Tuba Tune, op. 15 (1929), a composition for organ by Craig Sellar Lang
- Tuba Tune (1978), a composition for organ by Dulcie Holland
