= Joachim Andersen =

Joachim Andersen may refer to:

- Joachim Andersen (composer) (1847–1909), Danish composer
- Joachim Andersen (footballer) (born 1996), Danish footballer
