= Prelude in C =

Prelude in C may refer to:

- Prelude in C major (disambiguation)
- Prelude in C minor (disambiguation)
- Prelude in C-sharp minor (disambiguation)
