= Preludes (Kabalevsky) =

Dmitry Kabalevsky's Preludes, Op. 38, are a set of 24 piano pieces in the Chopinian model, each based on a folksong and each in a different key. It was composed in 1943–44, and dedicated to Nikolai Myaskovsky, his teacher. It is one of a number of examples of music written in all 24 major and minor keys.

The score is headed by a quote from Mikhail Lermontov on Russian folksong.

== List of preludes ==
1. Andantino. C major. 27 bars.
2. Scherzando. A minor. 38 bars.
3. Vivace leggiero. G major. 53 bars
4. Andantino. E minor. 63 bars.
5. Andante sostenuto. D major. 45 bars.
6. Allegro molto. B minor. 35 bars.
7. Moderato e tranquillo. A major. 26 bars.
8. Andante non troppo. Semplice e cantando – Poco Agitato – Tempo I. F♯ minor. 29 bars.
9. Allegretto scherzando – Poco più mosso. E major. 63 bars.
10. Non troppo allegro ma agitato. Recitando, rubato – Largo – Come prima – Largo. C♯ minor. 43 bars.
11. Vivace scherzando. B major. 61 bars.
12. Adagio. G♯ minor. 35 bars.
13. Allegro non troppo. F♯ major. 69 bars.
14. Prestissimo possibile. E♭ minor. 100 bars.
15. Allegretto marcato. D♭ major. 32 bars.
16. Allegro tenebroso. B♭ minor. 59 bars.
17. Andantino tranquillo. A♭ major. 41 bars.
18. Largamente con gravita. F minor. 13 bars.
19. Allegretto. E♭ major. 35 bars.
20. Andantino semplice. C minor. 53 bars.
21. Festivamente. Non troppo allegro. B♭ major. 57 bars.
22. Scherzando. Non troppo allegro. G minor. 62 bars.
23. Andante sostenuto. F major. 30 bars.
24. Allegro feroce – Meno mosso. Marciale. – Pochissimo più mosso – Poco meno mosso. D minor. 105 bars.
