= Semyon Barmotin =

Russian pianist, composer and teacher

Semyon Alexeyevich Barmotin
- Born: 26 January 1877; Saint Petersburg, Russian Empire
- Died: 5 April 1939 (aged 62)
- Occupations: pianist; composer; teacher

Academic background
- Education: Saint Petersburg Conservatory

Academic work
- Discipline: Music
- Institutions: Saint Petersburg Conservatory

Semyon Alexeyevich Barmotin (26 January 1877 – 5 April 1939) was a Russian pianist, composer and teacher. He was long obscure, not being mentioned in any music dictionaries until 1989, but a 2019 world premiere recording of some his important piano works has gained him positive critical notice. Referring to the 20 Preludes, Op. 12, one commentator wrote: "As a listener, what stands out is how well-crafted and delightful these little works are ... how on earth it is that they only now have their world premiere recording?"

== Career ==
Barmotin was born in Saint Petersburg. His father was from Tambov peasant stock who had served in a grenadier regiment at the Imperial Palace. Barmotin's musical gifts were apparent from an early age, and his mother arranged for him to be taught by Mily Balakirev, who was then Director of the Imperial Chapel. He then studied composition at the Saint Petersburg Conservatory under Nikolai Rimsky-Korsakov 1899–1901. He himself taught at the Imperial Chapel before going to teach at a school in Kherson, and then privately on his return to Saint Petersburg. From 1919-23 he was director of choral singing for the Baltic fleet, and 1923-25 taught at his alma mater, now known as the Petrograd Conservatory.

Barmotin is not mentioned in the main Western music dictionaries. Only in 1989 did he gain an entry in the Biographical Dictionary of Russian/Soviet Composers (ed. Dmitry Feofanov and Allan B Ho) published in the United States, but that provides only sparse and incomplete information.

== Death ==
Barmotin's obscurity extended even to the details of his death. The date and circumstances of his death were unknown for many decades, which led some commentators to speculate that he suffered a dire fate at the hands of the Soviet regime in the 1930s. It was only in recent times that his death date of 5 April 1939 was established, based on a hand-written obituary found in the Saint Petersburg City Archives; but the place and circumstances of his death are still unknown. The Biographical Dictionary of Russian/Soviet Composers characterizes the lack of death date as "suspicious" (e.g. he was possibly executed by the Soviet regime).

== Works ==
Much of Barmotin's music is for solo piano, including a Sonata in G-flat, 20 Preludes, Theme and Variations, suites and miscellaneous pieces. He also wrote three operas (one for children), a Violin Sonata, a Poème symphonique for orchestra, Hymn to Comrade Stalin, and October Victory, a march-cantata to celebrate the 20th anniversary of the October Revolution. Most of his work was published by such important houses as Mitrofan Belyayev and P. Jurgenson.

=== Works with opus number ===
- Op.1 - Theme and Variations, for Piano
- Op.2 - 3 Lieder ohne Worte, for Piano (dedicated "to my wife Vera")
- Op.4 - Piano Sonata (in G-flat major)
- Op.5 - 6 Pieces, for Piano
- Op.6 - 10 Pieces, for Piano
- Op.7 - 3 Romances, for Voice and Piano
- Op.9 - Tableaux de la vie enfantine [Картинки из детской жизни], 22 pieces for Piano
- Op.10 - Ballade, for Piano
- Op.12 - 20 Preludes, for Piano (1910) (these are all in different keys, which has caused commentators to speculate that he intended to write a full set of 24)
- Op.14 - Violin Sonata
- Op.18 - Ах, сколько, сколько пало их (János Arany, transl. by Aleksey Pleshcheyev), for Mixed chorus a cappella
- Op.19 - Pieces, for Piano

=== Works without opus number ===
- Princess Zemlyanichka, children's opera. (1916)
- We will be like the sun, opera. (1926)
- Yaga, operetta. (1926)
- Poème symphonique for orchestra. (1930) (dedicated to the memory of his teacher Mily Balakirev)
- Hymn to Comrade Stalin. (1936)
- October Victory, (march-cantata to celebrate the 20th anniversary of the October Revolution)
- Funeral Cantata to the memory of Lenin, for Mixed chorus with Piano
- Komsomol March, for Chorus with Piano
- To the Women of the Commune, Cantata for Soloists and Mixed chorus with Piano

=== Harmonization ===
- Komsomol Dances, for Piano and Chorus;
- Мы кузнецы, for Voice and Piano
- Смело, товарищи, в ногу, for 2-voice Chorus with Piano

== Recordings ==
A "Meditation" for Military Wind Orchestra was recorded in 1994. However, the first significant recording of any of Barmotin's works seems to be Christopher Williams's 2019 world premiere recording, for the Grand Piano label, of the 20 Preludes, Op. 12, and the Theme and Variations, Op. 1. Williams has since released two further discs of Barmotin's piano music.
