= Prelude in C minor =

Prelude in C minor may refer to:

- Prelude in C minor, by Johann Sebastian Bach, from the Prelude and Fugue in C minor, BWV 847, from Book I of The Well-Tempered Clavier
- Prelude in C minor, by Johann Sebastian Bach, from the Prelude and Fugue in C minor, BWV 871, from Book II of The Well-Tempered Clavier
- Prelude in C minor, BWV 934, by Johann Sebastian Bach, from the Six Little Preludes, BWV 933–938
- Prelude in C minor, BWV 999, by Johann Sebastian Bach, for solo lute
- Prelude in C minor, Op. 28 No. 20, by Frédéric Chopin
- Prelude in C minor, Op. 23 No. 7, by Sergei Rachmaninoff

== See also ==
- Prelude in C (disambiguation)
