= The Homecoming (painting) =

Painting by Arnold Böcklin

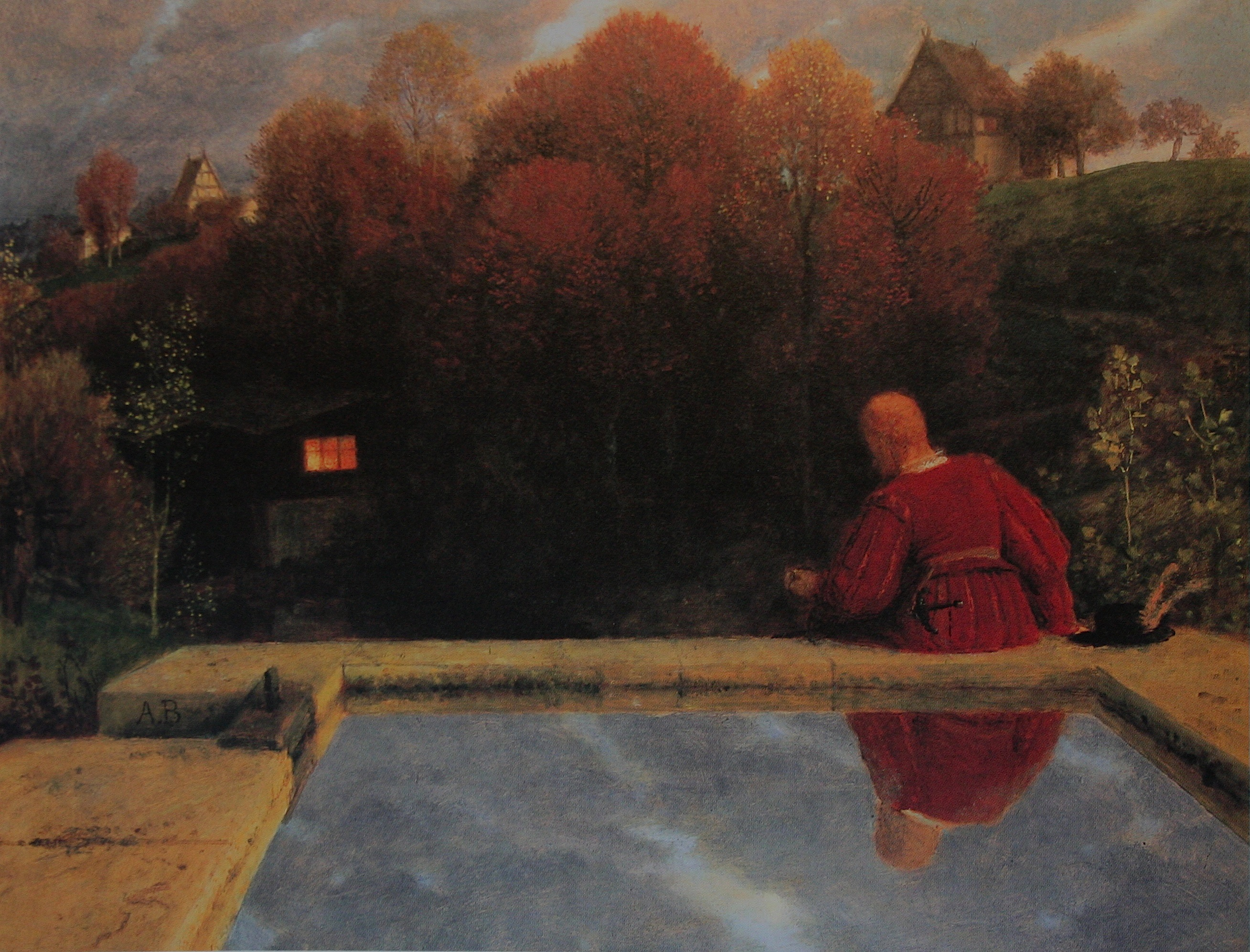
- Artist: Arnold Böcklin
- Year: 1887
- Medium: oil on canvas
- Dimensions: 78 cm × 100 cm (31 in × 39 in)
- Location: Private collection

The Homecoming, (German: Die Heimkehr) also known as The Return or Returning Home, is a painting created in 1887 by the Swiss Symbolist artist Arnold Böcklin (1827–1901). It is currently held in a private collection.

== Description and analysis ==
The painting depicts a man sitting on the edge of a square pool of water, facing away from the angle of viewing. His back is reflected in the water. He looks forward towards a house, which sits in a shadow cast by a group of trees.

In 1886, Böcklin moved from Florence to Zürich, meaning he was back in his homeland Switzerland for the first time since his youth. The Homecoming could be interpreted as representing his own "homecoming" to Switzerland.

== Rachmaninoff's Prelude No. 10 in B minor, Op. 32 ==
The Russian composer Sergei Rachmaninoff was inspired by The Homecoming when he wrote his Prelude No. 10 in B minor, Op. 32. Valentin Antipov believed that the title The Return was relevant to the narrative of the set of preludes.

Another composition by Rachmaninoff, his symphonic poem Isle of the Dead, was inspired by Böcklin's painting of the same name.

== See also ==
- List of paintings by Arnold Böcklin
- Preludes, Op. 32 (Rachmaninoff)
