= 24 Caprices for Violin (Rode) =

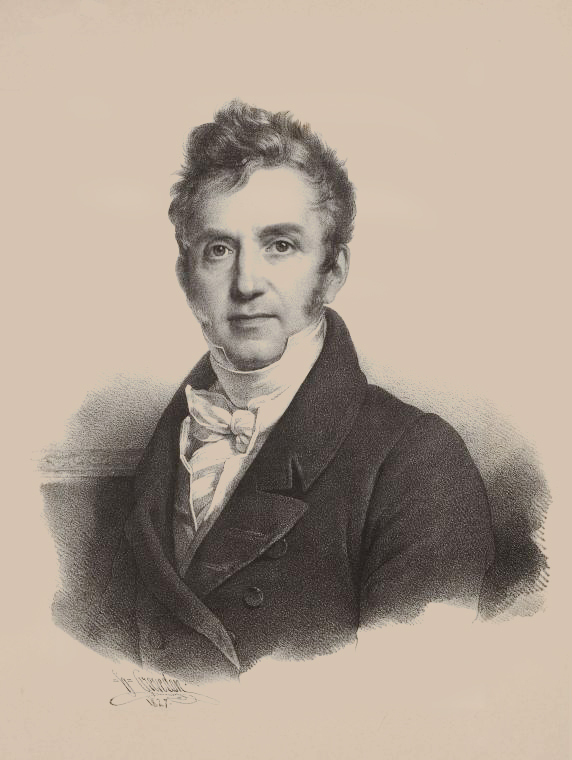
Portrait of composer Pierre Rode

The 24 Caprices for Violin, Op. 22, composed in the early nineteenth century by Pierre Rode, are a series of 24 caprices for solo violin. They cycle through the circle of fifths, presenting each major key and then its relative minor. They were first published in 1813.

Violinists often use these caprices in training to develop technique.

== Caprices ==
There are 24 caprices:

1. Caprice No. 1 in C major
  - Cantabile, 3/4
  - Moderato, 12/8
2. Caprice No. 2 in A minor
  - Allegretto, 6/8
3. Caprice No. 3 in G major
  - Comodo, 3/4
4. Caprice No. 4 in E minor
  - Siciliano, 6/8
  - Allegro,
5. Caprice No. 5 in D major
  - Moderato,
6. Caprice No. 6 in B minor
  - Adagio, 3/4
  - Moderato,
7. Caprice No. 7 in A major
  - Moderato,
8. Caprice No. 8 in F♯ minor
  - Moderato assai, 12/8
9. Caprice No. 9 in E major
  - Adagio, 3/4
  - Allegretto, 12/16
10. Caprice No. 10 in C♯ minor
  - Allegretto, 3/8
11. Caprice No. 11 in B major
  - Allegro brillante,
12. Caprice No. 12 in G♯ minor
  - Comodo, 3/4
13. Caprice No. 13 in G♭ major
  - Grazioso,
14. Caprice No. 14 in E♭ minor
  - Adagio con espressione,
  - Appassionato, 3/4
15. Caprice No. 15 in D♭ major
  - Vivace assai, 3/8
16. Caprice No. 16 in B♭ minor (In the middle of this caprice, the key changes to B♭ major, briefly back to B♭ minor, and then ends in B♭ major.)
  - Andante, 2/4
17. Caprice No. 17 in A♭ major
  - Vivacissimo, 2/4
18. Caprice No. 18 in F minor
  - Presto, 3/8
19. Caprice No. 19 in E♭ major
  - Arioso, 3/4
  - Allegretto, 6/8
20. Caprice No. 20 in C minor
  - Grave e sostenuto,
21. Caprice No. 21 in B♭ major
  - Tempo giusto, 3/4
22. Caprice No. 22 in G minor
  - Presto, 3/8
23. Caprice No. 23 in F major
  - Moderato,
24. Caprice No. 24 in D minor (This caprice ends in D major.)
  - Introduzione, 3/4
  - Agitato con fuoco, 2/4

== See also ==
- 24 Caprices for Solo Violin (Paganini)
- Music written in all major or minor keys
