= Pierre Rode =

French violinist and composer (1774-1830)

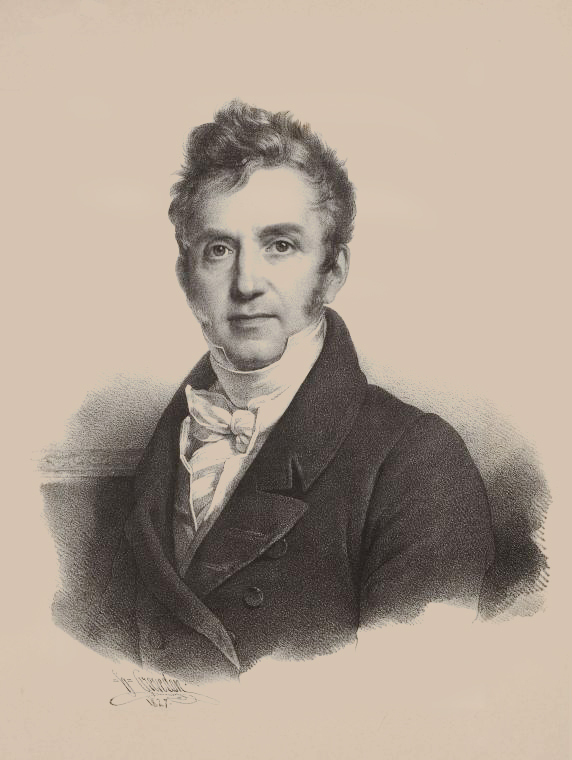
Pierre Rode

Jacques Pierre Joseph Rode (French pronunciation: [ʒak pjɛʁ ʒozɛf ʁɔd]; 16 February 1774 – 25 November 1830) was a French violinist and composer.

== Life and career ==
Born in Bordeaux, Aquitaine, France, Pierre Rode traveled in 1787 to Paris and soon became a favourite pupil of the great Giovanni Battista Viotti, who found the boy so talented that he charged him no fee for the lessons. Rode inherited his teacher's style, to which he added more mildness and a more refined tone. It is also recorded that he made extensive use of portamento. He collaborated with Baillot and Kreutzer on the official Violin Method of the Conservatoire de Paris, published in 1802.

Rode served as violin soloist to Napoleon and toured extensively in the Netherlands, Germany, England and Spain, staying with François-Adrien Boieldieu in Saint Petersburg from 1804 until 1809, and later spending much time in Moscow.

When he returned to Paris, he found that the public no longer responded with much enthusiasm to his playing. Spohr, who heard him both before and after his Russian sojourn, wrote that Rode's playing had become “cold and full of mannerism”. However, according to some sources, he suffered from a lymphatic infection caused by streptococcus bacteria that affected his right arm, reducing his ability to bow with any force or rapidity.

Ludwig van Beethoven wrote his last violin sonata (Op. 96) for Rode when the violinist was visiting Vienna. He also performed chamber music, but the backbone of his repertoire was formed by Viotti's concertos, which served as models for his own concertos. These, as well as the 24 Caprices in all the major and minor keys, were written from 1814 to 1819 when he lived in Berlin.

In 1828 Rode made a last attempt at a public concert in Paris. It was such a fiasco that it was widely believed (as reported by Schuenemana, in citation above) that it hastened his death, on 25 November 1830 at Château de Bourbon near Damazan, Lot-et-Garonne, in his native Aquitaine.

== Compositions ==
In all, Pierre Rode composed 13 violin concertos and many other works for violin, including at least four Quatuors brillants for violin and string trio. Although Rode's violin concertos have some significance in the development of the Romantic concerto, they are nowadays rarely performed. His major enduring contribution to the literature are his 24 Caprices, which are a standard part of the repertoire for advanced study of the violin. He also had a major influence on younger violinists, such as Louis Spohr, who adopted his style and developed it further.

== French bibliography ==
- Joann Élart, "Circulation des quatre symphonies oeuvre VII de Johann Franz Xaver Sterkel de l'Allemagne à Rouen : un itinéraire singulier du goût musical entre 1770 et 1825", Studien zu den deutsch-französischen Musikbeziehungen im 18. und 19. Jahrhundert, bericht über die erste gemeinsame Jahrestagung der Gesellschaft für Musikforschung und der Société française de musicologie Saarbrücken 1999 (Hildesheim : Georg Olms Verlag, 2002), pp. 266–281.
- Joann Élart and Patrick Taïeb, "La Complainte du Troubadour de Pierre-Jean Garat (1762–1823)", Les Orages, No. 2, L'imaginaire du héros (Besançon : Apocope, May 2003), pp. 137–168.
- Joann Élart, "La mobilité des musiciens et des répertoires : Punto, Garat et Rode aux concerts du Musée", Le Musée de Bordeaux et la musique 1783–1793, ed. Patrick Taïeb, Natalie Morel-Borotra and Jean Gribenski (Rouen : PURH, 2005), pp. 157–173.
- Joann Élart, "Les origines du concert public à Rouen à la fin de l'Ancien Régime", Revue de musicologie, No. 93/1 (2007), pp. 53–73.
