= Preludes, Op. 31 (Alkan) =

Piano compositions by Charles-Valentin Alkan

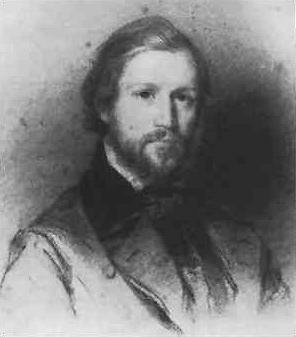
Charles-Valentin Alkan, c. 1835

Charles-Valentin Alkan wrote his Preludes, Op. 31 for solo piano or organ in 1844 and they were published in 1847. These preludes span all 24 major and minor keys, plus an additional 25th prelude in C major.

== The Preludes, Op. 31 ==
1. Lentement, C major
2. Assez lentement, F minor
3. Dans le genre ancien, D♭ major
4. Prière du soir, F♯ minor
5. Psaume 150me, D major
6. Ancienne mélodie de la synagogue, G minor
7. Librement mais sans secousses, E♭ major
8. La chanson de la folle au bord de la mer, A♭ minor
9. Placiditas, E major
10. Dans le style fugué, A minor
11. Un petit rien, F major
12. Le temps qui n'est plus, B♭ minor
13. J'étais endormie, mais mon cœur veillait, G♭ major
14. Rapidement, B minor
15. Dans le genre gothique, G major
16. Assez lentement, C minor
17. Rêve d'amour, A♭ major
18. Sans trop de mouvement, C♯ minor
19. Prière du matin, A major
20. Modérément vite et bien caractérisé, D minor
21. Doucement, B♭ major
22. Anniversaire, E♭ minor
23. Assez vite, B major
24. Étude de vélocité, E minor
25. Prière, C major

== Reception ==
Alkan's contemporary François-Joseph Fétis cautioned critics and the public not to compare Op. 31 with the works of Chopin:

We must not expect to find in this artist's volume of preludes a flurry of fast notes by means of which certain pianists presage the skill before the performance of a piece. Alkan is a person of heart and mind; his preludes are dream-like which conceal a very calculated and finished art form.

== See also ==
- List of compositions by Charles-Valentin Alkan
- Music written in all major or minor keys
