= Daniel Léo Simpson =

American composer (born 1950)

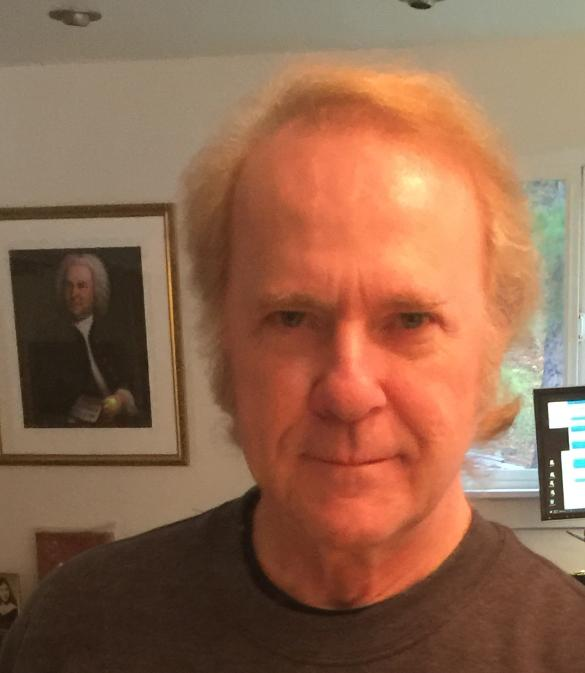
Daniel Léo Simpson - San Francisco, California USA

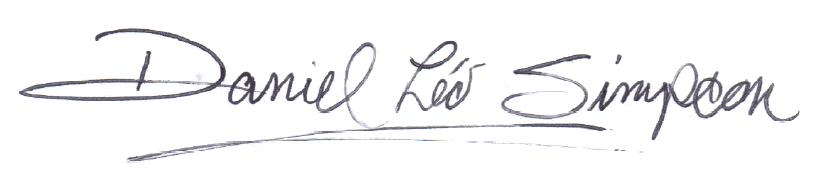
Signature of Daniel Léo Simpson

Daniel Léo Simpson (born 28 December 1959) is an American composer.

== Background ==
Audio Samples
Tuscaloosa Tango

Simpson first studied music theory with Wes Humphrey at Buena High School in Sierra Vista, Arizona and composed its Alma Mater which he conducted at the première performance there February 9, 2012. He studied as an undergraduate with Anna Mae Sharp and Henry Johnson at the University of Arizona, Tucson and continued his graduate work there with Robert McBride and Robert Muczynski to receive his master's degree in composition. He won first place in the First Annual International Schillinger composition contest sponsored by The Schillinger School of Music for his composition The Art of Schillinger. He was also first-place winner of the 2010 Alabama Orchestra Association Festival competition contest for his composition Tuscaloosa Tango which received its world première at the University of Alabama, February 14, 2011, (A division of Alabama Music Educators Association). It has now also been performed by the Iraqi National Symphony Orchestra conducted by maestro Mohammed Amin Ezzat as well as the Orquestra Sinfônica da Paraíba of Brazil conducted by maestro Luiz Carlos Durier. His "Ave Maria" for two sopranos, flute and organ received its world première in Salem, Germany, in April 2011. Mezzo Soprano Liliana Seyid-Boussonville premièred the "Alleluia" from his "Exsultate Jubilate" in Saarland, Germany, in April 2011. Simpson has composed the first complete String Quartet specifically to have included the Viola Profonda, a new instrument invented by the Bolivian composer, director and instrument-developer Gerardo Yañez. In 2012, Simpson's complete cycle of 24 Inventions for piano was performed and recorded by Gustavo la Cruz in Berlin, Germany.
