= Franciszek Zachara =

Polish pianist and composer

An early photograph of Franciszek Zachara from a poster / press sheet used around the time Zachara came to the U.S. (circa 1928). Photographer unknown.

Franciszek Zachara (b Tarnów, Austrian Poland (now Poland), 10 December 1898; d Tallahassee, Florida, United States, 2 February 1966) was a Polish pianist and composer who concertized extensively throughout Europe in the years leading up to 1928. He was a professor of piano at a Polish conservatory from 1922–1928, and two American colleges from around this time until his death in 1966. Zachara composed well over 150 works, including many works for piano solo, a piano concerto, a symphony, several works for band, and various chamber pieces. The archive of his manuscripts is held at the Warren D. Allen Music Library at Florida State University. Most of these manuscripts are originals (or copies) from the composer's own hand.

== Biography ==
Franciszek Zachara was born in Tarnów, Austrian Poland to parents Ludwig and Maria (Kapłańska) Zachara on December 10, 1898. He was educated in the State Gymnasium in Warsaw, and graduated from the Imperial Conservatory in Saratov (Russian: Сара́тов) in 1919. He then attended the Imperial Conservatory in St. Petersburg (Russian: Санкт-Петербу́рг, then known as Petrograd), studying piano with Alexander Dubassoff, and graduated in 1921. From 1922 to 1928 he was professor of piano at the Silesia State Conservatory in Katowice, Poland.

On November 18, 1928 Zachara gave his American debut in New York's Town Hall. He played an extensive program of works by J.S. Bach, Beethoven, Chopin, Mozart, Scarlatti-Tausig, Scriabin, Debussy, Liszt, and a piece of his own. The recital was reviewed enthusiastically by The New York Times, The Sun, and the New York Herald-Tribune. After this performance, he began a year-long concert tour of the United States, and became Professor of Piano (and later Dean of Music) at Brenau College (now Brenau University) in Gainesville, Georgia (USA), where he remained until 1946. During this time he married Patty Haralson, took up marksmanship, and won many medals in this new hobby. He is quoted:

I began shooting as a sport or hobby after America entered the war, in 1942. At that time I was living in Gainesville, Georgia. … The National Guard was offering a course in marksmanship to civilians who wished to take part. I thought that every American man should become proficient with firearms since we were fighting for our existence; so I registered for the course (Florida Wildlife, 37).

In 1946, Zachara became a U.S. citizen, and relocated to New York for a short period. In 1948 he became Associate Professor of Piano at Florida State University, where composer and pianist Ernő Dohnányi had also just started teaching. On February 25, 1952, the American premiere of Zachara's Piano Concerto in E Major (op. 30) was performed by the State Symphony of Florida, with the composer as soloist and Dohnányi conducting. Becoming a full professor in 1955, Zachara continued composing, performing, and teaching at the School (now College) of Music at Florida State University until he was hospitalized on January 21, 1966 suffering a heart attack. He died less than two weeks later, on February 2, in a Tallahassee hospital. (Tallahassee Democrat, 1966). He was survived by his widow Patty and a nephew Stanley. They had no children.

Zachara was a member of several organizations, including the Florida Composers League, the Florida State Music Teachers Association, the Music Teachers National Association, the Kiwanis Club, the Manhattan Chess Club, the National Rifle Association, the Tallahassee Rifle and Pistol Club (president), Pi Kappa Lambda, the International Who's Who in Music, and the American Association of University Professors.

== Zachara's music and publications ==
Image of Zachara from Florida Wildlife (v. 7, April 1954, p. 36). This photo was likely taken at a performance for Florida or Georgia public television in the early 1950s.

Zachara composed well over 150 works, including many works for piano solo, a piano concerto, a symphony, several works for band, and various chamber pieces. Many of these works were dedicated to his friends and colleagues over the years.

Zachara's music is mostly written in a Romantic vein, and most of his piano music follows in the footsteps of his countryman, Frédéric Chopin (1810-1849). Zachara was an expert in the music of Chopin, and it is said that he had all of Chopin's music memorized. He occasionally did transcriptions of the music of other composers, including Chopin, Liszt, Strauss, and others. Partial scores of transcriptions exist of Chopin's 'Butterfly' Etude (Op. 25 No. 9) for piano solo, and two-piano versions of Chopin's Etude Op. 25 No. 9, and 'Minute Waltz' (Op. 64 No. 1). Zachara had used his own opus numbering system earlier in his career, extending at least to his piano sonatas (opus numbers 80 and 81) but this system seems to have been abandoned by the early 1950s. The list of works below reflects original opus numbers assigned by Zachara. A new system of assigning notation to all of Zachara's works, whether completely or partially existing, is currently being created (2008).

Zachara's works for piano solo largely reflect models used by J.S. Bach and Chopin. Zachara wrote many preludes, fugues, etudes, and waltzes, often arranging them in collections of 12, 24, or 48. Though some of these collections no longer exist in their entirety, it seems Zachara was aiming to create collections which would give examples in all major and minor keys. An extensive collection titled New Well-Tempered Clavicord for the Piano is clearly taken from the Bach model, consisting of 24 sets of preludes and fugues in all major and minor keys, with an additional 25th prelude and fugue (on a theme from Dohnányi) added at the end. Zachara seems to have composed at least three piano sonatas, but only partial scores exist for these works (opus numbers 75, 80, and 81).

Zachara wrote many chamber works for a variety of instruments. His best-known chamber piece (and possibly the most successful of all his works) is the Sonata for Clarinet and Piano No. 1 (op. 72). This work was published by Leblanc Publications in 1964, and is still available today (2007), published by Southern Music Company. Aside from the piano solo music, only one other solo piece exists (Polonaise Brilliante for Flute Alone); and Zachara only wrote one vocal piece, Help me oh Lord. Eleven sonatas for solo instrument plus piano survive, as do two of his three string quartets. Some of the chamber music, such as Valse Sentimentale and Grande Suite in Blue were scored for both chamber and band/orchestral settings.

Zachara's music has been published by at least 8 publishers, including Gamble Music Co., Theodore Presser Co., Leblanc Publications Inc., Music Publisher's Holding Corp., Remick, G. Schirmer, Shattinger Piano & Music Co., and Southern Music Co. Vinyl recordings of him playing works by Liszt, Chopin, Delibes- Dohnányi, and Strauss-Zachara were released by Transphono/Ohio Recording Service.

== Works ==
Much of Zachara's music is now lost or exists in fragmentary forms. The list below was selected from the works that exist in their entirety (in score form).

=== Piano solo collections ===
- New Well-Tempered Clavicord for the Piano (25 sets of preludes and fugues)
- Six Piano Pieces for Left Hand Alone (op. 43)
- Three Organ Chorales Piano Transcription (op. 44)
- Twelve Master Etudes in Minor Keys (op. 29)
- Twelve Master Preludes (op. 19)
- Twelve Waltzes for Piano (op. 52)
- Twenty-Four Etudes in All Keys
- Two Mazurkas

=== Piano solo individual works ===
Americana for Piano Solo
Barcarolle (op. 9)
Berceuse for Piano Solo
Boogie Woogie Etude
Burlesque
Capriccio in E-flat Major (op. 39)
Capriccio in F-sharp Major (op. 5)
Dutch Dance
Gavotte in B Minor
Gavotte in D Major
Grand Valse Chromatique
Indian Sacrifice
Menuet in A Minor
Menuet in Classic Style
The Music Box
The Music Box: Cracoviene Polish Natinoale Dans
Poeme (op. 12)
Rondo for Piano Solo
Sans Souci
Scherzo in E Minor (op. 29)
Second Rhapsody by Liszt
Slavic Dance
The Star Spangled Banner (arrangement)
Suite in Classic Style (op. 7)
Twelve Variations on the Theme "America"
Twelve Variations on the Theme "Happy Birthday" for Piano and Orchestra
Waltz in G Major [No. 1]

=== Chamber works ===
Americana for Two Pianos or Four Hands
Double Concerto for Two Clarinets and Strings
Fantasia for Trumpet and Piano (op. 32)
Five Fugues for Woodwind Trio
Fugue in Six Voices (flute, oboe, 2 clarinets, 2 bassoons)
Grande Suite in Blue for Clarinet and Piano
Help me oh Lord (voice and piano)
Humoresque (clarinet and piano)
March for Two Pianos (op. 1)
Meditation (cello and piano)
Pastorale and Fugue for Woodwind Trio
Perpetual Motion (two pianos, or piano four hands)
Piano Concerto in E Major (op. 30) (Two-Piano Version)
Polonaise Brilliante for Flute Alone
Rondo Brillante for Strings
Rondo Brillante for Woodwind Trio and Strings or Piano
Serenade for Violin and Piano
Six Pieces for Cello and Piano
Sonata Expaniole for Woodwind Trio
Sonata for Bassoon and Piano (op. 46)
Sonata for Cello and Piano (op. 13/40/73) – various versions
Sonata for Clarinet and Piano No. 1 (op. 72)
Sonata for Clarinet and Piano No. 2
Sonata for Horn and Piano
Sonata for Oboe and Piano (op. 55)
Sonata for Oboe and Piano (op. 77)
Sonata for Trombone and Piano (op. 18)
Sonata for Trumpet and Piano (op. 22/42)
Sonata for Violin and Piano (op. 71)
String Quartet in D Major
String Quartet in G Major (op. 31/38)
Ten Master Pieces for Discriminating Woodwind Performers (various w.w. trios, or two clarinets and piano)
Three Organ Chorales
Toccata for Two Clarinets and Piano
Triple Concerto for Oboe, Clarinet, Bassoon and Strings
Twenty-Four Variations on the Theme "Happy Birthday" for Two-Pianos
Two Organ Chorales for Woodwind Trio
Valse Sentimentale (cello and piano)
Valse Triste (clarinet and piano)
Variations and Fugue for Oboe, Clarinet and Bassoon
Variations on a Nursery Rhyme for Woodwind Trio

=== Band/orchestral works ===
Concerto Grosso No. 1 (Horn Solo)
Concerto Grosso No. 2 (Trumpet Solo)
Concerto Grosso No. 3 (Cello Solo)
Concerto Grosso No. 4 (Violin Solo)
Concerto Grosso No. 5 (Oboe Solo)
Concerto Grosso No. 6 (Trombone Solo)
Grande Suite in Blue for Clarinet Solo and Symphonic Band
March Carnaval (symphonic band)
March No. 1 (symphonic band)
March No. 2 (symphonic band)
March No. 3 (symphonic band)
March No. 4 (symphonic band)
Mediation for Symphonic Band
Piano Concerto in E Major (op. 30)
Rhapsody for Trumpet and Symphonic Band
Romanza Espaniole (symphonic band)
Rondo Brillante for Solo Clarinet and Symphonic Band
Symphonic Waltz No. 2 (orchestra)
Symphony No. 1 (op. 60)
Twenty-Four Variations on the Theme "Happy Birthday" for Piano and Orchestra
Valse Sentimentale for Symphonic Band
Valse Symphonique (symphonic band)
