= Stefano Golinelli =

Italian piano virtuoso and composer

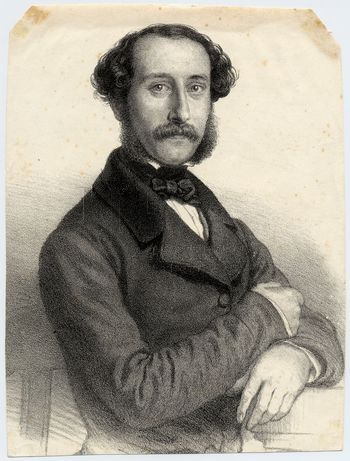
Stefano Golinelli

Stefano Golinelli (26 October 1818 Bologna – 3 July 1891 Bologna) was an Italian piano virtuoso and composer. In 1840 he was appointed by Gioachino Rossini, then an Honorary Councillor of the Liceo Musicale di Bologna, professor for piano at the Liceo (now the Conservatorio Giovanni Battista Martini), a post he held until 1871. He composed a large number of works for the piano, especially noteworthy 3 Sonatas, and 2 collections of 24 Preludios, op. 23 and 69. He is buried at the Certosa cemetery in his hometown. At his death, he left his Érard piano to the Accademia Filarmonica di Bologna.
