= 2 Preludes through all the Major Keys (Beethoven) =

Two preludes by Ludwig Van Beethoven

- by Ludwig van Beethoven
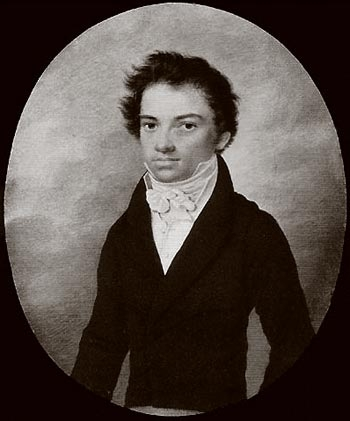
- Beethoven in 1789, by Joseph Neesen
- Key: all major keys
- Opus: 39
- Composed: 1789
- Published: 1803
- Scoring: Piano/Organ

2 Preludes through all the Major Keys, Op. 39, is a set of two preludes by Ludwig van Beethoven. Composed in 1789, they were published in December 1803, along with his Romance No. 1 for Violin and Orchestra, Op. 40, and a Serenade for Piano and Flute, Op. 41. Although the original autograph is lost, a copy from Artaria still exists in Berlin.

The first prelude is 6 minutes long, which gives a substantial amount of time for key changes. Each key occupies between 2 and 26 measures in length, starting and ending in C major. The original ending to this prelude is now its own composition, catalogued as Hess 310. The second prelude is highly virtuosic, as it cycles through all the keys twice in less time than the first prelude, starting and ending in C major.

Not much has been written about the preludes. Barry Cooper writes about how they "...attempt to outdo Bach’s famous sets of preludes in every key, by modulating rapidly through every major key within the space of about 100 bars."
