= Antonio Carbonchi =

Italian composer

Antonio Carbonchi was a 17th-century guitarist and composer who wrote two influential books on lute playing.

== Biography ==
Cabonshi was born in Florence, sometime around the year 1600. He joined the army of Tuscany in its war against the Turks, and for his courage in battle he was made a Knight of the Order of Tuscany. After his military service he became a musician, specializing in innovative music for the guitar family.

== Publications and writings ==
Carbonchi's first book, Sonate de chitarra spagnola con intavolatura franzese, was published in Florence in 1640. This book was dedicated to Mattias de' Medici as a patron of music. The music in this book is written in French-style lute tabulature, regardless of whether the music was to be plucked or strummed. Carbonchi wrote that the French notation was in response to requests by his foreign students.

Carbonchi's second book, Dodici chitarre spostate, was published in Florence in 1643. This volume was dedicated to the Marchese Bartolomeo Corsini. The final 32 compositions contained in this work are written for twelve guitars, each guitar tuned to a different note on the chromatic scale. Although such an ensemble is unlikely, it empirically proved the guitar's utility as a chromatic instrument.

In addition to the two published works, there exist manuscripts known to be by Carbonchi, as well as those attributed to him.

== Style ==
Carbonchi's compositions consist of music written in the Italian dance styles, including the Ciacconda, Passacaglia, and Spagnoletta dance songs.
