= Joseph Christoph Kessler =

German musician

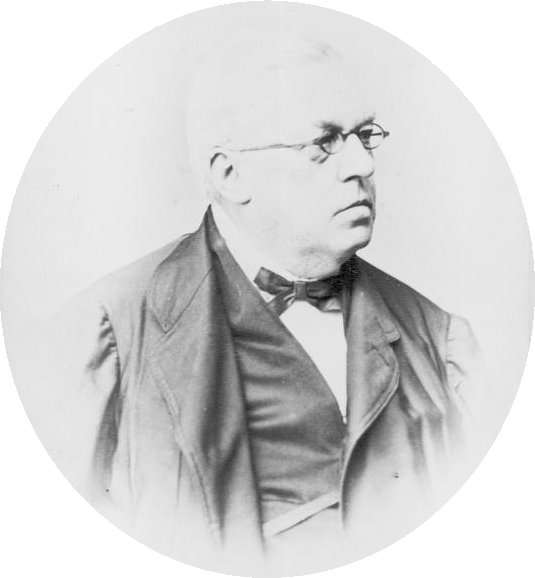
Joseph Christoph Kessler, photograph by Josef Löwy, circa 1872

Joseph Christoph Kessler (26 August 1800 – 14 January 1872), also seen as Kötzler, was a German pianist and composer who was active mostly in the Austrian Empire. His études, nocturnes, variations, preludes and bagatelles were praised by such people as Franz Liszt, Sigismond Thalberg, Ignaz Moscheles and Friedrich Kalkbrenner, and he was the dedicatee of the 24 Preludes, Op. 28 by Frédéric Chopin.

Kessler was born at Augsburg in 1800. He studied under the organist Bilek at Feldsberg and at a seminary at Nicolsburg. He then studied philosophy in Vienna. He became a piano teacher in Lemberg, where, at the house of Count Potocki, he wrote his 24 Études, Op. 20, one in every key. These were published in 1827. The études were celebrated in their day, being played by Franz Liszt in his concerts, and praised by Fétis, Moscheles and Kalkbrenner, who used some of Kessler's works in their own pedagogical material. He also taught at Landshut.

Frédéric Chopin became exposed to Kessler's music while he was in his teens, in Warsaw. Kessler arrived in Warsaw in 1829, and quickly became part of the musical life there. He was one of a number of people who gave regular musical soirees attended by Chopin. It was at such Kessler soirees that Chopin heard for the first time works such as Beethoven's "Archduke" Trio. Kessler and Chopin became firm friends. Kessler's Études were arranged in a circle of fifths, unlike Johann Sebastian Bach's The Well-Tempered Clavier, which is arranged in ascending chromatic order. It has been said that Chopin may have even borrowed the title "étude" from Kessler, and copied from Kessler the idea of using metronome marks in his scores.

Kessler dedicated to Chopin a set of 24 Preludes, Op. 31, one in each of the major and minor keys. A decade later, Chopin repaid the dedication in his own 24 Preludes, Op. 28, and he also employed the circle of fifths that Kessler used in his 24 Études; however, he may have been earlier influenced by Hummel's Preludes, Op. 67 (1815), which also use this schema.

On 6 February 1836, Robert Schumann wrote an article in the Neue Zeitschrift für Musik comparing the significance of études written by various composers. Bach, Clementi, Cramer, Moscheles and Chopin were considered "the most important", while Kessler was described as "merely capable". On the other hand, Schumann said of Kessler: "Mann von Geist und sogar poetischem Geist".

Kessler moved back to Vienna, then returned to Warsaw; he also lived at Breslau, and for 20 years at Lemberg. He returned to Vienna in 1855, where he died in 1872.

== List of works ==
- 24 Études, Op. 20 (1827), dedicated to Johann Nepomuk Hummel
- Fantasy, Op. 23
- Impromptus, Op. 24
- Bagatelles, Op. 30
- 24 Preludes, Op. 31, dedicated to Frédéric Chopin
- Quatre Pensées fugitives, Op. 72
- Études for the left hand, Op. 92
- 25 Études, Op. 100
- Variations brillants on I puritani
- nocturnes
- polonaises
- church music
- songs (Blüthen und Knospen)
- concertos
