= Ignatius de Orellana =

Ignatius Antonio de Orellana (October 14, 1860 – March 19, 1931) was a British violinist and composer. He became a conductor of theatre orchestras and an arranger of music for the theatre.

== Life ==
Orellana was born in St Helier in Jersey, where his grandfather Ignacio de Orellana, originally from Spain, had settled by 1841. He studied the violin in London.

=== Early compositions ===
He composed a string quartet and a string trio, which were published in 1888. In the same year his Six Melodic Studies for Pianoforte were published; a reviewer in The Musical World commented that they "are an attempt to combine tuneful interest with the pursuit of various technical objects, and in this the composer has been in great measure successful."

In 1890 his Twenty-four Melodic Studies for Pianoforte were published; a reviewer in The Musical World commented, "The term 'melodic' is justified by the tunefulness of each of the numbers.... All are pleasingly distinctive in character and well harmonised, and they should attract tolerably advanced players."

=== Orchestral leader and conductor ===
Orellana became lead violinist of London theatre orchestras, and from about 1900 was a conductor of operettas and an orchestrator of scores for the theatre by Paul Rubens and others.

In later years he was musical director of Harold Fraser-Simson's music in Toad of Toad Hall, produced in 1929, and he wrote the overture to Noël Coward's 1929 operetta Bitter Sweet.

He died in 1931 in London.

The composer Eric Coates, who in his early career played in London theatres, wrote that Orellana had "a remarkable sense of the theatre, and being a sound musician his arrangements were always delicately finished and in good taste. It was fascinating to get hold of a vocal score of one of the popular musical comedies of the day and run through the music on the piano, and then listen in the evening to what Orellana could make it sound like."
