= Joachim Andersen (composer) =

Danish flutist, conductor and composer

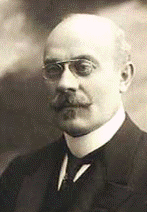
Joachim Andersen

Carl Joachim Andersen (29 April 1847 – 7 May 1909) was a Danish flutist, conductor and composer born in Copenhagen, son of the flutist Christian Joachim Andersen. Both as a virtuoso and as composer of flute music, he is considered one of the best of his time. He was a demanding leader and teacher, achieving high standards with orchestras.

== Biography ==
As well as his little brother, Viggo was taught by his father and already as a child he performed with success at a Danish theater called Casino accompanied by the little harpist Frantz Pønitz. From when he was 13 years old to the year of 1868 he was first flutist in a musical orchestra in Copenhagen conducted by Niels Gade.

In 1869 he became employed by the Royal Danish Orchestra as a flutist but resigned after a year of leave in 1878. He was longing for larger challenges and went abroad. First stop was Saint Petersburg (1878–1880) where he was engaged by St. Petersburg Philharmonic Orchestra. Afterwards in 1881 he went to Berlin where he was engaged in Bilse's Band as a solo flutist as well as he was in the Royal German Opera.

In 1882 he was a co-founder of the Berlin Philharmonic, which he and 53 other musicians formed out of the former Bilse's Band. Along with his job as a solo flutist, he took over more and more conductor's assignments and conducted over 8 summers one of the orchestra's two daily concerts in Scheveningen.

In 1893 Andersen was forced to resign his job because of a paralysis in his tongue and travelled then back to Copenhagen where he was employed as a composer. Among other pieces he was the composer of concerts in Tivoli Gardens. In 1897 he founded an orchestra school and was, until his death, leader and professor in conducting at the school. In 1905 he was knighted by king "Christian IX of Denmark" to the "Order of the Dannebrog ". He played on flutes of simple systems, although many of his pupils, among them the famous flutists Emil Prill and Ari van Leeuwen, played on flutes of the Böhm system.

== Works ==
Caprice No.1 Op.15
Performed by David Hernando

Caprice No.24 Op.15
Performed by David Hernando

Caprice No.3 Op.15
Performed by David Hernando

His compositions are exclusively for the flute. His 8 volumes of etudes for flutists are considered his largest success. They are still used globally when one wants to be a professional.

His complete works consist of 63 opuses which are mainly for the flute including solo pieces and piano accompanied pieces. The Christian X's Honour March that was composed to the then crown prince reached popularity.

=== List of works ===
The following list is incomplete.

- op.2 – Ungarische Fantasie für Flöte mit Piano oder Orchester Begleitung (Ungarsk fantasi)
- op.3 – Concertstück für Flöte mit Begleitung des Orchesters oder des Pianoforte (Koncertstykke)
- op.5 – Ballade and dance of the sylphs (Ballade et danse des Sylphes)
- op.6 – Morceaux de Salon. Nº1 Solitude & Nº 2 Désir, pour flûte avec accompagnement de piano (Morceaux de Salon)
- op.7 – Impromptu pour flûte avec accompagnement de piano
- op.8 – Moto perpetuo
- op.9 – At the river shore (Au Bord de la Mer)
- op.10 – Tarantella für Flöte mit Begleitung des Pianoforte oder des Orchesters
- op.15 – 24 grosse Etüden für Flöte (Fløjteetuder)
- op.16 – Fantaisie caractéristique pour Flûte avec accompagnement de Piano ou D'Orchestre (Fantaisie Caractéristique)
- op.19 – Album sheet (Album-Blatt)
- op.21 – Etudes for flute (Fløjteetuder)
- op.22 – La Resignation (Meditation) et Polonaise, for flute and piano (La Resignation et Polonaise)
- op.24 – Six salon pieces in two suites (Six Morceaux de Salon, en deux Suites)
- op.26 – Variations Drolatiques
- op.27 – Elegy variations (Variations Elegiaques)
- op.28 – Two pieces (Deux Morceaux)
- op.30 – 24 Instructive Uebungen in allen Tonarten für Flöte (Fløjteetuder)
- op.33 – Etudes for flute (Fløjteetuder)
- op.35 – Wien Neerlands Bloed. Fantaisie über di holländische Volkshymne für Flöte mi Begleitung des Pianoforte oder des Orchesters
- op.37 – 26 Kleine Capricen für die Flöte (Fløjteetuder)
- op.41 – 18 Kleine Studien für die Flöte (Fløjteetuder)
- op.44 – L'Hirondelle
- op.45 – Opern-Transcriptionen für Flöte und Pianoforte (Operatranskriptioner)
- op.46 – Reunion (Wiedersehen)
- op.47 – Solo performance for young flutists (Solovortrag für junge Flötenspieler)
- op.48 – Allegro Militaire
- op.49 – Pirun Polska (Polka du diable) Introduction et Caprice sur des airs finnois pour Flûte avec accompagnemente D'Orchestre ou de Piano (Pirun Polska)
- op.50 – Schwedische Polska-Lieder pour flûte et piano (6 Svenske polsker)
- op.51 – Four salon pieces (Quatre Morceaux de Salon)
- op.51 - no.2- Intermezzo
- op.52 – Salon pieces, part 1 + 2 (Salonstücke Heft 1 + 2)
- op.53 – Canzone + Memory (Canzone + Erinnerung)
- op.54 – Deuxième Impromptu
- op.55 – Eight Performer Pieces (Acht Vortragsstücke)
- op.56 – Five easy pieces (Fünf leichtere Stücke)
- op.57 – Three pieces (Trois Morceaux)
- op.58 – Introduction et caprice sur des aires hongroises, for flute and orchestra or flute and piano
- op.59 – National Fantasies (Fantasies Nationales)
- op.60 – Etudes for flute (Fløjteetuder)
- op.61 – Deuxième Morceau de Concert pour Flûte et Orchestre ou Piano (Deuxième Morceaux de Concert)
- op.62 – Ten pieces (Dix morceaux)
- op.63 – 24 Technical Etudes (24 Etudes Techniques)

=== List of pieces (not opuses) ===
- Dances
- Marches
- Some mood pieces
- Christian X's Honour March (Christian d. 10.'s honnørmarch)
- Silver Myrtles (piano)
- Sølvmyrter Vals (piano)
- Slaraffia-Polka-Mazurka (piano)

== Media ==
Étude Op. 15 No. 3 for Solo Flute
Performed by Scott Goff
