= Craig Sellar Lang =

British musician

Craig Sellar Lang (13 May 1891 – 24 Nov 1971) was a New Zealand-born British organist, composer and music teacher.

== Education ==
Born in Hastings, New Zealand, C. S. Lang (known to his friends as "Robin") was educated at Clifton College, and was a pupil of Walter Parratt and Charles Stanford at the Royal College of Music.

He was an ARCM and received his Doctorate of Music from The University of Durham.

== Teaching ==
Lang returned to Clifton as assistant music master in 1921. His works from this period include the secular cantata Lochinvar (Op. 7, 1927), Two Hundred Tunes for Sight-Singing (1928) based on his teaching experience, and a variety of arrangements and new works created so the entire school congregation could join the choir and organ in psalms and canticles.

In 1929 he was appointed Director of Music at Christ's Hospital school in Horsham, West Sussex, to where the choristers of Westminster Abbey were briefly evacuated during the Second World War. An obituary recorded his "personal magnetism" and determination to awaken "the budding musicianship of every sort of pupil".

Lang resigned from this post in 1945 in order to devote more time to examining and composition. His instructional works, aimed at students, were highly influential. Generations of organists were brought up on his Harmony at the Keyboard, Exercises in Score Reading, as well as his books entitled Exercises for Organists, designed to prepare organ students for the keyboard tests of the Royal College of Organists' diploma exams.

== Composition ==
C. S. Lang's choral music includes service settings (such as the Magnificat and Nunc Dimittis in B flat, Op.16, written for Corpus Christi College, Cambridge), and anthems such as He shall give his angels charge over thee (1941). His setting of Psalm 8 has remained popular. There are also many anthems for trebles' voices, composed for use at Christ's Hospital, as well as numerous secular choral works.

His best-known work is the Tuba Tune for organ (1929), Opus 15, a favourite of recitalists. This dashing little piece, which owes its title to the boisterous melody sounded forth on the organ's tuba stop, begins in the style of Handel but, in its central section, has some brief key changes that could belong to no century except the 20th. Lang's numerous other works for organ include a lengthy Sonata in D minor (Op. 47, 1947), the Introduction and Passacaglia in A minor (Op.51, 1952), the Fugue-Trilogy on E.G.B. (Op. 58, 1952), and many hymn preludes and sets of preludes and fugues.
