= Prelude in C-sharp minor (Rachmaninoff) =

Piano composition by Sergei Rachmaninoff

The massive theme occupies four staves in the second A section. The top two staves are both played by the right hand, the bottom two by the left.

Sergei Rachmaninoff's Prelude in C♯ minor (Russian: Прелюдия, romanized: Prelyudiya), Op. 3, No. 2, is one of the composer's most famous compositions. Part of a set of five piano pieces entitled Morceaux de fantaisie ("Pieces of fantasy"), it is a 62-bar prelude in ternary (ABA) form. It is also known as The Bells of Moscow, since the introduction seems to reproduce the Kremlin's most solemn carillon chimes.

On 26 September 1892, the composer himself performed the work for the first time, at a festival called the Moscow Electrical Exhibition. After the première, a review of the concert singled out the Prelude, noting that it had "aroused enthusiasm". From this point on, its popularity grew.

Rachmaninoff later published 23 more preludes to complete a set of 24 preludes covering all the major and minor keys, in a time-honored tradition pioneered by composers such as Bach, Chopin, Alkan, Scriabin, and many others.

== Background ==
This work was one of the first that the 19‑year‑old Rachmaninoff composed as a "Free Artist", after he graduated from the Moscow Conservatory on 29 May 1892. He performed this new work for the first time at one of the concerts of the Moscow Electrical Exhibition on 26 September 1892. It was printed the following year as the second of five Morceaux de fantaisie (Op. 3), all dedicated to Anton Arensky, his harmony teacher at the Conservatory. Because at the time Russia was not party to the 1886 Berne Convention, Russian publishers did not pay royalties, so the only financial return he ever received for this piece was a publishing fee of 40 rubles (about two months' wages for a contemporary factory worker).

== Composition ==
Prelude in C♯ minor
Played by Rachmaninoff himself for Edison Records in 1919

The prelude is organized into three main parts and a coda:

- The piece opens with a three-note motif at fortissimo that introduces the C♯ minor tonality that dominates the piece. The cadential motif repeats throughout. In the third bar, the volume changes to a piano pianissimo for the exposition of the theme.
- The second part is propulsive and marked Agitato (agitated), beginning with highly chromatic triplets. This builds to interlocking chordal triplets that descend into a climactic recapitulation of the main theme, this time in four staves to accommodate the volume of notes. Certain chords in the section are marked with quadruple sforzando.
- The piece closes with a brief seven-bar coda that ends quietly.

== Reception ==
The prelude became one of Rachmaninoff's most famous compositions. His cousin Alexander Siloti was instrumental in securing the Prelude's success throughout the Western world. In the autumn of 1898, he made a tour of Western Europe and the United States, with a program that contained the Prelude. Soon after, London publishers brought out several editions with titles such as The Burning of Moscow, The Day of Judgement, and The Moscow Waltz. America followed suit with other titles (such as The Bells of Moscow).

The prelude was so popular that it was referred to as "The Prelude", and audiences would demand it as an encore at his performances, shouting: "C-sharp!" Because of this, Rachmaninoff grew very tired of it and once said: "Many, many times I wish I had never written it." He called it his "Frankenstein" (alluding to a creation that got out of control).

Rachmaninoff recorded the piece electrically, on Welte-Mignon reproducing pianos, and on Ampico piano rolls.

The prelude has been arranged for orchestra in several versions. It has been used in many films, and many songs have sampled it. Several jazz adaptations have been written, including one for Paul Whiteman which Rachmaninoff himself admired. In regards to Mickey Mouse's performance of the prelude in the 1929 animated short The Opry House, Rachmaninoff reportedly told Walt Disney in 1942 "I have heard my inescapable piece done marvelously by some of the best pianists, and murdered cruelly by amateurs, but never was I more stirred than by the performance of the great maestro Mouse".

== See also ==
- Morceaux de fantaisie (Op. 3)

== Bibliography ==
- Rahmer, Dominik (2024). "Vorwort (Foreword) to History of the work, including a contemporary photography of the Electrical Exhibition (size: 1249 KB)" (PDF). Archived from the original (PDF) on 2017-05-17.
