= 24 Preludes, Op. 11 (Scriabin) =

Set of preludes by Alexander Scriabin

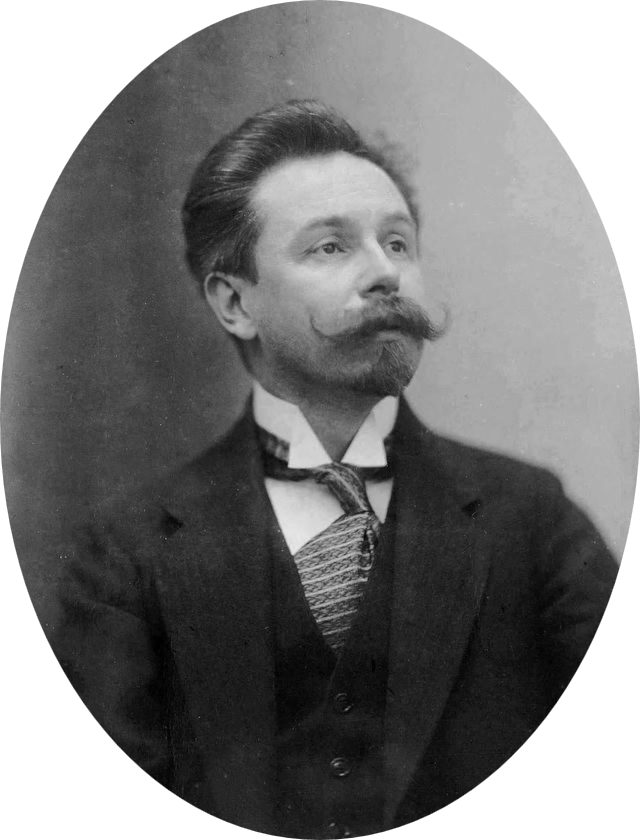
Alexander Scriabin in 1900

Alexander Scriabin's 24 Preludes, Op. 11 is a set of preludes composed in the course of eight years between 1888–96, (Note: Scriabin did not write the 24 preludes chronologically, but instead in different places over the course of eight years. Prelude No. 4 was written in Moscow in 1888, followed by No. 6 in 1889 in Kiev. No. 10 was written in 1893–4 in Moscow, and No. 14 in 1895 in Dresden. Nos. 3, 19, 24 in 1895 in Heidelberg, and Nos. 12, 17, 18 and 23 also in 1895 in Witznau. No. 5 was written in 1896 in Amsterdam, Nos. 8 and 22 also in 1896 in Paris, while Nos. 1, 2, 7, 9, 11, 13, 15, 16, 20 and 21 were written that same year in Moscow.) being also one of Scriabin's first published works with M.P. Belaieff in 1897, (Note: Belyayev divided the preludes into four parts of six preludes each.) in Leipzig, Germany, together with his 12 Études, Op. 8 (1894–95).

Scriabin entered a wager with his friend, M.P. Belaieff that by April 1896 he could compose a cycle of forty-eight preludes twice traversing the major and minor keys. Although he had already completed forty-six of the pieces he distanced himself from this project and divided the preludes over several volumes and opus numbers (op. 11, 13, 15, 16 and 17).

Only opus 11, with its strict adherence to the circle of fifths to encompass each major and minor key, bears a resemblance to his original idea. Quite apart from the spiritual kinship with Chopin's art apparent in Scriabin's early music, both cycles are similar in construction, with the pieces arranged in relative major and minor keys following the circle of fifths. However, Scriabin himself never mentioned a conscious attempt to imitate Chopin's set of preludes, and by this time he had put aside his early enthusiasm for the Polish composer's music.

== Structural analysis ==
Scriabin's 24 preludes were modeled after Frédéric Chopin's own set of 24 Preludes, Op. 28: They also covered all 24 major and minor keys and they follow the same key sequence: C major, A minor, G major, E minor, D major, B minor and so on, alternating major keys with their relative minors, and following the ascending circle of fifths.

It is considered an outstanding set among Scriabin's early works, with easy-to-difficult numbers, among them No. 2 in A minor, No. 3 in G major, No. 6 in B minor, No. 8 in F♯ minor, No. 14 in E♭ minor, No. 15 in D♭ major, No. 16 in B♭ minor, No. 18 in F minor, and No. 24 in D minor.

== Preludes ==
The 24 preludes are as follows.

- No. 1 in C major – Vivace
- No. 2 in A minor – Allegretto
- No. 3 in G major – Vivo
- No. 4 in E minor – Lento
- No. 5 in D major – Andante cantabile
- No. 6 in B minor – Allegro
- No. 7 in A major – Allegro assai
- No. 8 in F♯ minor – Allegro agitato
- No. 9 in E major – Andantino
- No. 10 in C♯ minor – Andante
- No. 11 in B major – Allegro assai
- No. 12 in G♯ minor – Andante
- No. 13 in G♭ major – Lento
- No. 14 in E♭ minor – Presto
- No. 15 in D♭ major – Lento
- No. 16 in B♭ minor – Misterioso
- No. 17 in A♭ major – Allegretto
- No. 18 in F minor – Allegro agitato
- No. 19 in E♭ major – Affettuoso
- No. 20 in C minor – Appassionato
- No. 21 in B♭ major – Andante
- No. 22 in G minor – Lento
- No. 23 in F major – Vivo
- No. 24 in D minor – Presto

=== No. 1 in C major ===
Préludes Opus 11
No. 1 in C major – Vivace
Played by Scriabin in 1910 for Welte-Mignon player piano (1:46)

No. 2 in A minor – Allegretto
Played by Scriabin in 1910 for Welte-Mignon player piano (1:47)

No. 4 in E minor – Lento
Played on Bösendorfer 290 (1:42)

No. 6 in B minor – Allegro
Played on Bösendorfer 290 (0:58)

No. 9 in E major – Andantino
Performed by Axel Lange (1:31)

No. 10 in C♯ minor – Andante
Performed by Axel Lange (1:26)

Prelude No. 1 was composed in November 1895 in Moscow. Here Scriabin's virtuosic sustain pedaling assembles clusters of up to seven different diatonic notes in an exquisite sonority that Scriabin himself used to describe as a "psychic shift".

The whole melody of this prelude consists of 240 eighth-notes, being the opening chord of this piece C–D–E–F–G–A, with the C-major tonic in the bass. The time value for each eighth note changes whenever the tempo flexes, as can be noticed in the second group of notes in the 2nd bar, which measures less than half the tempo of the second group in the 14th bar. This piece has 26 bars and takes about one minute to be played with a Vivace tempo marking.

=== No. 4 in E minor ===
Prelude No. 4, composed in Moscow in 1888, was the first of the 24 preludes, Op. 11 written by Scriabin. Intended originally as a ballade, the piece was reworked to its present form and entitled Prelude. Despite the fact that both hands have beautiful melodies indicated with tenutos in bars 1–3–9–11, and the alto voice in the 16, the one for the left hand seems to take the credit as the most beautiful between the two. Tenths arpeggiated in bars 20–23 lead to the top note of the chord to fall on the beat.

This composition's structural form is A (bars 1–8), A repeated (9–14), bridge (15–19), and coda (20–24), being that the second phrase repeats the first a fourth lower. It is 24 bars long with a Lento tempo marking, and it takes about two minutes to be played.

=== No. 9 in E major, Op. 11 ===
Prelude No. 9 is 36 bars long and takes almost a minute and a half to perform, being played at an Andantino pace. Despite its key, the left hand voice often plays C♯ minor passages, while the right hand plays relatively consistently within the bounds of E major, giving the piece a unique tone colour.

The piece begins with a gentle left hand melody in C♯ minor accompanied by distinctly major right hand block chords. The frequent major ninths and major sevenths contribute luxurious tone colour of the piece. In the eighth bar, a chromatic scale rises back up to the C♯ to repeat the first four bars of the initial melody. This time, a triplet with a dotted rhythm is employed as an additional counterpoint in the right hand.

In the thirteenth bar, we see further development of the melody, using sweeping but short crescendos and decrescendos. The next four bars act as a bridge to the second section at bar 17, where a soaring tenor melody is accompanied by luscious harmonies in the right hand. This section continues until the 30th bar, when an A-major chord is played but then, when the pedal lifts, only the third C♯ is heard, and the initial melody is repeated, using the right hand harmony from the ninth bar. The piece ends with three block chords, in a very powerful dominant cadence, with the concluding E-major chord, arpeggiated.

One of the critically acclaimed performances of this piece is that of Mikhail Pletnev on his disc Scriabin: 24 Preludes/Sonatas 4 & 10.

=== No. 10 in C♯ minor ===
Prelude No. 10 is 20 bars long and takes under a minute-and-a-half to be played. It is marked at Andante. It has two sections of mysterious major seventh intervals and tritone harmonies, split up by a lyrical E major section. Like many of Scriabin's slower pieces, it is played very rubato.

The first section is, as mentioned, very mysterious, as Scriabin employs many tritones and seventh intervals which do not fall into the key of C♯ minor. The first 8 bars feature modulations to D♯ minor and F♯ minor. The ninth bar, marked con anima, introduces an E major melody using more conventional harmonies, but the piece only delves yet again deeper into the depths of the mystery four bars later. Here, marked fortississimo, the initial melody comes out in full force using the broad tessitura scope of the piano.

At the seventeenth bar, the piece calms to quiet block chords of F♯ minor, C♯ minor-7, and B major-9 (without the bass B), finally resolving to an arpeggiated final C♯-minor chord, reminiscent of the ninth prelude immediately preceding this one. This shows Scriabin's ability to find commonality in his most diverse works.

One of the critically acclaimed performances of this piece is that of Mikhail Pletnev on his disc Scriabin: 24 Preludes/Sonatas 4 & 10. Another is the 1956 recording by Vladimir Horowitz found the RCA/Victor issue "Horowitz Plays Scriabin."
