= Prelude (music) =

Musical work and musical form

A prelude (German: Präludium or Vorspiel; Latin: praeludium; French: prélude; Italian: preludio; Russian: прелюдия) is a short piece of music, the form of which may vary from piece to piece. While, during the Baroque era, for example, it may have served as an introduction to succeeding movements of a work that were usually longer and more complex, it may also have been a stand-alone piece of work during the Romantic era. It generally features a small number of rhythmic and melodic motifs that recur through the piece. Stylistically, the prelude is improvisatory in nature. The term may also refer to an overture, particularly to an opera or an oratorio.

A prelude and fugue generally consists of two movements in the same key for solo keyboard. In classical music, the combination of prelude and fugue is one with a long history. Many composers have written works of this kind. The use of this format is generally inspired by Johann Sebastian Bach's two books of preludes and fugues, The Well-Tempered Clavier, completed in 1722 and 1742 respectively. Bach, however, was not the first to compose such a set: Johann Caspar Ferdinand Fischer wrote a 20-key cycle in his 1702 work Ariadne musica.

Many composers have written sets of 24 Preludes, such as Bach, Chopin, Scriabin, Shostakovich, and Debussy.

== History ==
The first preludes to be notated were organ pieces that were played to introduce church music, the earliest surviving examples being five brief praeambula in the Ileborgh Tablature of 1448. These were closely followed by freely composed preludes in an extemporary style for the lute and other Renaissance string instruments, which were originally used for warming up the fingers and checking the instrument's tuning and sound quality, as in a group of pieces by Joan Ambrosio Dalza published in 1508 under the heading tastar de corde (in Italian, literally, "testing of the strings").

Keyboard preludes started appearing in the 17th century in France: unmeasured preludes, in which the duration of each note is left to the performer, were used as introductory movements in harpsichord suites. Louis Couperin (c.1626–1661) was the first composer to embrace the genre, and harpsichord preludes were used until the first half of the 18th century by numerous composers including Jean-Henri d'Anglebert (1629–1691), Élisabeth Jacquet de la Guerre (1665–1729), François Couperin (1668–1733), and Jean-Philippe Rameau (1683–1764), whose very first printed piece (1706) was in this form. The last unmeasured preludes for harpsichord date from the 1720s.

The development of the prelude in 17th-century Germany led to a sectional form similar to keyboard toccatas by Johann Jakob Froberger or Girolamo Frescobaldi. Preludes by northern German composers such as Dieterich Buxtehude (c.1637–1707) and Nikolaus Bruhns (c.1665–1697) combined sections of free improvised passages with parts in strict contrapuntal writing (usually brief fugues). Outside Germany, Abraham van den Kerckhoven (c.1618–c.1701), one of the most important Dutch composers of the period, used this model for some of his preludes. Southern and central German composers did not follow the sectional model and their preludes remained improvisational in character with little or no strict counterpoint.

During the second half of the 17th century, German composers started pairing preludes (or sometimes toccatas) with fugues in the same key; Johann Pachelbel (c.1653–1706) was one of the first to do so, although the "prelude and fugue" pieces of Johann Sebastian Bach (1685–1750) are much more numerous and well-known today. Bach's organ preludes are quite diverse, drawing on both southern and northern German influences. Most of Bach's preludes were written in the theme and variation form, using the same theme motif with imitation, inversion, modulation, or retrogression of the theme as well as other techniques involved in this Baroque form.

Johann Caspar Ferdinand Fischer was one of the first German composers to bring the late 17th-century French style to German harpsichord music, replacing the standard French ouverture with an unmeasured prelude. Fischer's Ariadne musica is a cycle of keyboard music which consists of pairs of preludes and fugues; the preludes are quite varied and do not conform to any particular model. Ariadne musica served as a precursor to Johann Sebastian Bach's The Well-Tempered Clavier, two books of 24 "prelude and fugue" pairs each. Bach's preludes were also varied, some akin to Baroque dances, others being two- and three-part contrapuntal works not unlike his Inventions and Sinfonias. Bach also composed preludes to introduce each of his English Suites.

The Well-Tempered Clavier influenced many composers in the coming centuries, some of whom wrote preludes in sets of 12 or 24, sometimes with the intention of utilizing all 24 major and minor keys as Bach had done. Frédéric Chopin (1810–1849) wrote a set of 24 preludes, Op. 28, often composed in a simple ternary form, which liberated the prelude from its original introductory purpose and allowed it to serve as an independent concert piece. While other pianist-composers, including Muzio Clementi, Johann Nepomuk Hummel, and Ignaz Moscheles, had previously published collections of preludes for the benefit of pianists unskilled at improvisatory preluding, Chopin's set renewed the genre.

Chopin's set served as a model for other collections of 24 or 25 piano preludes in the major and minor keys, including those by Charles-Valentin Alkan (Op. 31 for piano or organ), Ferruccio Busoni (Op. 37, BV 181), César Cui (Op. 64), Stephen Heller (Op. 81), and Alexander Scriabin (Op. 11). Claude Debussy (1862–1918) wrote two books of impressionistic piano preludes which, unusually in this genre, carry descriptive titles. Chopin's conception of the prelude as an unattached character piece expressing a mood rather than a specific musical programme extended into the 20th century with works by composers such as George Antheil, George Gershwin, Alberto Ginastera, Dmitry Kabalevsky, Bohuslav Martinů, Olivier Messiaen, Sergei Rachmaninoff (who also completed an entire set), Giacinto Scelsi, and Karol Szymanowski.

Preludes were also incorporated by some 20th-century composers into Baroque-inspired suites: such "attached" preludes include Maurice Ravel's Le Tombeau de Couperin (1914/17) and Arnold Schoenberg's Suite for piano, Op. 25 (1921/23), both of which begin with an introductory prelude (Schoenberg's choral introduction to the Genesis Suite is a rare case of an attached prelude written in the 20th century without any neobaroque intent). As well as a series of unattached piano preludes (Op. 34), Dmitri Shostakovich composed a set of 24 Preludes and Fugues in the tradition of Bach's Well-Tempered Clavier, though arranged by key not chromatically, like Bach's, but using the circle of fifths, as Chopin had done.

Some avant-garde composers have also produced unattached preludes. John Cage's brief Prelude for Meditation is written for prepared piano, while François-Bernard Mâche's Prélude (1959) and Branimir Sakač's Aleatory Prelude (1961) call on electronic resources and aleatoric techniques.

== Notable collections of preludes ==
- Johann Caspar Ferdinand Fischer (c. 1656–1746) wrote his Ariadne musica (1702), which contained 20 preludes and fugues in 19 different keys.
- Johann Sebastian Bach (1685–1750) wrote the two volumes of The Well-Tempered Clavier (1722, 1744). Both volumes contain 24 preludes (and associated fugues) proceeding up the chromatic scale with alternating parallel major and minor keys (C major and C minor; C♯ major and C♯ minor; D major and D minor; etc.).
- Matthias Vanden Gheyn (1721–1785) composed 11 preludes, possibly off-the-cuff, for performance on a carillon, a musical instrument of bells. They are festive pieces featuring virtuosic progressions and effects to a propulsive bass rhythm. They are additionally the earliest known compositions specifically for the instrument. Citing his preludes, carillonneurs refer to Vanden Gheyn as "the Bach of the carillon."
- Ludwig van Beethoven (1770–1827) wrote two preludes, Op. 39, as a teenager; each one cycles through all of the major keys of the piano.
- Frédéric Chopin (1810–1849) wrote 24 Preludes, Op. 28 in 1839, which cycle through all of the major and minor keys. The odd-numbered preludes are in major keys, starting with C major, and each is followed by a prelude in the relative minor key. The paired preludes proceed through the circle of fifths (C major and A minor; G major and E minor; D major and B minor; etc.). Most can be played as stand-alone pieces.
- Charles-Valentin Alkan (1813–1888) wrote a set of 25 preludes, Op. 31, published in 1847. His key scheme differs from Chopin's in that the major keys ascend chromatically and are followed by their respective minor subdominants, though Alkan also starts on C major. The last piece returns to C major, hence the additional prelude (a device Alkan repeated in the Esquisses, Op. 63, and that César Cui employed in his own 25 Preludes, Op. 64). As a further distinction between his and Chopin's sets, Alkan provides programmatic titles for several of his preludes, including the most famous of the set, La chanson de la folle au bord de la mer (The Song of the Madwoman by the Seashore).
- Casimir Ney (1801–1877) wrote a collection of 24 preludes in all major and minor keys for solo viola from 1849 to 1853.
- Felix Blumenfeld (1863–1931) composed a set of 24 preludes, Op. 17 in 1892, following Chopin's key scheme, as well as a set of four, Op. 12.
- Florent Schmitt (1870–1958) wrote two books of preludes, book 1, 3 préludes op. 3 (1890 - 95), book 2,10 Préludes op. 5 (1896).
- Alexander Scriabin (1872–1915) wrote 24 Preludes, Op. 11 in 1896, and numerous shorter sets of preludes. He followed the same pattern as the Chopin preludes.
- Karol Szymanowski's (1882-1937) first published composition was a set of Nine Preludes, written between 1896 and 1900 (between the composer's 14 and 18 years of age). The Preludes are heavily influenced by Scriabin's and Chopin's music.
- Sergei Rachmaninoff (1873–1943) wrote a prelude, Op. 3, No. 2, in 1892 followed by 10 preludes, Op. 23 (1903) and 13 preludes, Op. 32 (1910) for a total of 24 preludes in all the major and minor keys; he also composed a prelude in D minor, without opus number, in 1917 (there is yet another among his early unpublished works).
- Claude Debussy (1862–1918) wrote two books of 12 Préludes, Book 1 (1910) and Book 2 (1913), for a total of 24 preludes. The title of the prelude is given at the end of the piece, while a Roman numeral serves as the heading.
- Olivier Messiaen (1908–1992)'s set of eight piano preludes (1929) developed from the Impressionism of Debussy's piano music.
- York Bowen (1884–1961) wrote a set of 24 preludes, his Op. 102, in 1938. It is in all major and minor keys and was published posthumously.
- Paul Hindemith (1895–1963) wrote Ludus Tonalis (1940), a set consisting of a prelude, 11 interludes, and a postlude, all separated by 12 fugues.
- Heitor Villa-Lobos (1887–1959) wrote 5 preludes for guitar (1940), which have become popular repertory pieces (No. 1, No. 2, No. 3, No. 4, No. 5). A sixth prelude is lost.
- Dmitry Kabalevsky (1904–1987) wrote many preludes for piano, op. 1, op. 5, op. 20, op. 38, op. 61 (1943–1944).
- Alberto Ginastera (1916–1983) wrote a cycle of 12 American Preludes (Doce Preludios Americanos; 1946).
- Dmitri Shostakovich (1906–1975) wrote a cycle of 24 Preludes and Fugues, Op. 87 in 1951, as well as an earlier set of 24 Preludes, Op. 34 (1933), for piano.
- Nikolai Kapustin (1937–2020) wrote 24 Preludes in Jazz Style, Op. 53, and later a set of 24 Preludes and Fugues, Op. 82, in 1989.
- Lera Auerbach (born 1973) wrote three full sets of 24 preludes, which cycle through all of the major and minor keys, for piano solo; violin and piano; and cello and piano (2003).

A carillonneur plays Prelude No. 9 by Matthias Vanden Gheyn at St. Rumbold's Cathedral in Mechelen, Belgium

== See also ==
- Chorale prelude
- Overture
- Music written in all major or minor keys
- Taqsim
