= 24 Preludes and Fugues (Shostakovich) =

1951 cycle of piano preludes and fugues by Dmitri Shostakovich

- by Dmitri Shostakovich
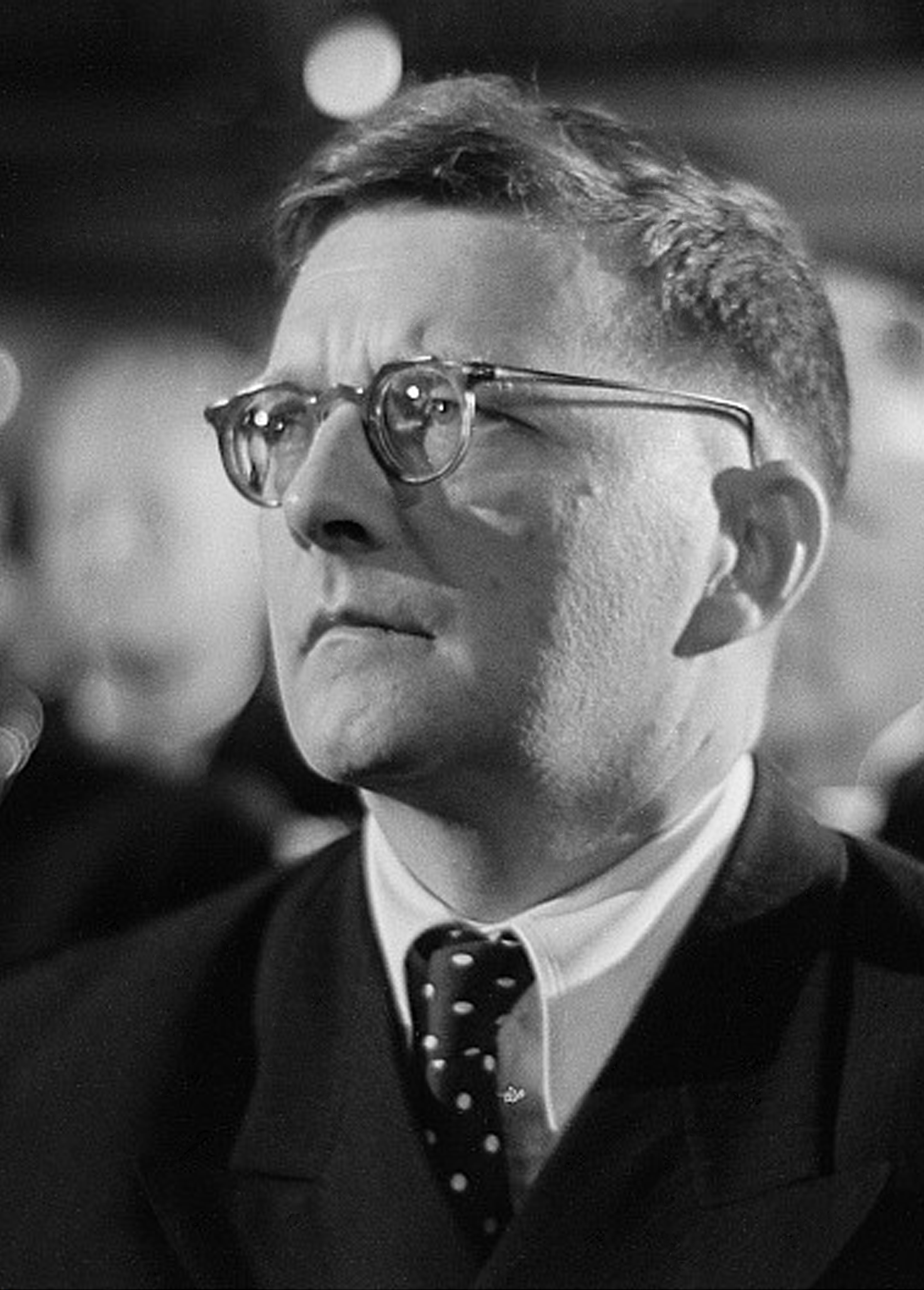
- Dmitri Shostakovich in 1950
- Key: all major and minor keys
- Opus: 87
- Composed: 1950–51
- Duration: 2 hours and 32 minutes (complete performance)

Premiere
- Date: 23 December 1952
- Location: Leningrad
- Performers: Tatiana Nikolayeva

The 24 Preludes and Fugues, Op. 87 by Dmitri Shostakovich are a set of 24 musical pieces for solo piano, one in each of the major and minor keys of the chromatic scale. The cycle was composed in 1950 and 1951 while Shostakovich was in Moscow, and premiered by pianist Tatiana Nikolayeva in Leningrad in December 1952; it was published the same year. A complete performance takes approximately 2 hours and 32 minutes. It is one the most notable examples of music written in all major or minor keys.

== History ==
After the Second World War, Dmitri Shostakovich was Russia's most prominent composer. Although out of favour with the Soviet Communist Party, he was still sent abroad as a cultural ambassador. One such trip was to Leipzig in 1950 for a music festival marking the bicentennial of J.S. Bach's death. As part of the festival, Shostakovich was asked to sit on the judging panel for the first International Johann Sebastian Bach Competition. One of the entrants in the competition was the 26-year-old Tatiana Nikolayeva from Moscow. Though not required by competition regulations, she had come prepared to play any of the 48 preludes and fugues of The Well-Tempered Clavier on request. She won the gold medal.

Inspired by the competition and impressed by Nikolayeva's playing, Shostakovich returned to Moscow and started composing his own cycle of 24 preludes and fugues. Shostakovich worked fairly quickly, taking only three days on average to write each piece. As each was completed, he would ask Nikolayeva to come and visit him in his Moscow apartment where he would play her the latest piece. The complete work was written between 10 October 1950 and 25 February 1951. Once finished, Shostakovich dedicated the work to Nikolayeva, who undertook the public premiere in Leningrad on 23 December 1952. Shostakovich wrote out all the pieces without many corrections except the B♭ minor prelude, with which he was dissatisfied and replaced what he had begun initially.

== Form and structure ==
The circle of fifths

Each piece is in two parts—a prelude and fugue—varying in pace, length and complexity (for example, Fugue No. 13 in F♯ major is in five voices, while Fugue No. 9 in E major is in only two voices).

The pieces proceed in relative major/minor pairs around the circle of fifths: first C major and A minor (prelude and fugue nos. 1 and 2), then to one sharp (G major, E minor), two sharps (D major, B minor), and so on, ending with D minor (1 flat). Chopin's 24 Preludes, Op. 28, and Shostakovich's own earlier 24 Preludes, Op. 34 are organized in the same way.

=== Relationship to Bach's The Well-Tempered Clavier ===
J.S. Bach's The Well-Tempered Clavier, an earlier set of 48 preludes and fugues, are widely held to be the direct inspiration for Shostakovich's cycle, largely based on the work's composition history.

References to and quotations from Bach's cycle appear throughout the work. For example, Shostakovich begins his C major prelude, the first piece in the cycle, with exactly the same notes that Bach uses in his own C major prelude, BWV 846, which likewise begins The Well-Tempered Clavier. Likewise, the composers' second fugues (A minor for Shostakovich, C minor for Bach) utilize very similar opening rhythms for their fugue subjects (two 16th notes followed by 3 eighth notes, twice in a row). In addition to more direct quotation, Shostakovich also at points imitates the various types of preludes found in the Bach cycle (and in other, similar, Baroque compositions). For example, his A minor prelude is a figuration prelude—a prelude in which the same hand position is used throughout the piece. Examples of this abound in Baroque keyboard literature from composers such as Johann Caspar Ferdinand Fischer, from whom Bach drew inspiration for his own figuration preludes (the C major and the D minor, for example).

On a larger scale, the whole structure, ordered and sequenced as it is with no apparent extra-musical narrative, is largely a response to Bach. In Bach's cycle, however, the pieces are arranged in parallel major/minor pairs ascending the chromatic scale (C major, C minor, C♯ major, C♯ minor etc.), which differs from Shostakovich's Op. 87.

But while the cycle "sustains the poise and clarity of Bach's high example", it also makes plentiful use of Russian musical influences. The final D minor Prelude and Fugue, for instance, "equally evokes Mussorgsky's primal choral utterances in Khovanshchina and Boris Godunov, music itself indebted to Russian liturgical chant". In the work as a whole there are also several references and musical ideas taken from Shostakovich's other music or anticipating future work.

== Analysis ==
| No. | Key | Description |
|---|---|---|
| 1 | C major | The prelude's unbroken chords evokes the first prelude of J.S. Bach's Well-Tempered Clavier. The tone is mostly pianissimo. The parallels with Bach continue in the fugue; whereas Bach begins with a scaled 4th, Shostakovich has a bare 5th. In contrast to the characteristic harmonic complexity of the prelude, the fugue is written in pandiatonic C major, without a single accidental. |
| 2 | A minor | The prelude is a toccata mostly for one voice, with semiquavers (16th notes) used as an implied cantus firmus and running through the piece in the style of a perpetuum mobile. It is followed by a three-part fugue with a characteristic theme of sevenths and acciaccaturas. |
| 3 | G major | With its echoes of Orthodox chant and bell, the prelude is composed of a juxtaposition of a pesante theme and a lighter quicker theme. The following fugue is the only one set in 6/8 time, although this meter is also shared by the F♯ major prelude. |
| 4 | E minor | The prelude begins with an eighth-note appoggiatura figuration phrased in pairs between a sustained cantus firmus in the bass and a lyrical melody in the soprano. There is a consistent legato/half-staccato phrasing throughout the prelude in which Shostakovich imitates Baroque period phrasing. The fugue is a double fugue in four voices with two distinct subjects developed in separate expositions. The first subject is a slow stepwise melody consisting mostly of half notes and quarter notes, while the second subject is a partial diminution or variation on the first subject (eighth notes instead of quarter notes). About two-thirds into the fugue, Shostakovich brings back the original subject in the bass combined with the second subject in the soprano. The E minor fugue is one of progressive complexity. The composition begins with a quiet, conservative exposition, but it ends with nearly every possible fugal device (invertible counterpoint, stretto, double stretto, diminution, augmentation, retrograde) exploited in the final bars. |
| 5 | D major | The prelude, a graceful Tchaikovsky-like waltz, maintains a suspended feel through repeated, arpeggiated chords in the right hand played to accompany a simple melody first in the left hand, then swapping roles midway, with sudden ritenutos scattered throughout. The fugue, marked allegretto, contrasts with the legato feel of the prelude with repeated staccato notes forming the basis of the fugal subject. Three voices develop with contrasting legato passages against the staccato. To further add to the quaint color of the movement, subito forte and piano are mixed in giving the fugue a frankly chipper tone. |
| 6 | B minor | Beginning much like a French overture (double dotted rhythms), this prelude remains very tonal throughout. The bass has much of the melodic content – again a device used by Bach in his 48 preludes and fugues. The following fugue starts with a short introduction. It then continues in a gentle weaving fashion (much like the C♯ minor fugue from Book I of Bach's 48). Much of the piece uses a counter melody against the fugal entries. Thematically, there are anticipations of the Tenth Symphony, completed two years later. |
| 7 | A major | Roles are reversed in this pair between prelude and fugue. The prelude is a two-part invention that begins with a tonic pedal and a cheerful, delicate motif that comes close to Bach in its style. The fugue is constructed from prelude-like arpeggios and contains no vertical dissonances whatsoever, instead creating harmonic motion by sporadically touching on unrelated keys such as B♭ major, D♭ major, and C major. The three-voice fugue begins with a statement of the main theme, or subject, in the soprano voice. While fugal subjects usually use stepwise motion, this subject uses only the notes of the A-major triad. This subject is then stated a fourth below in the alto, as would be expected in a Baroque fugue. After a brief interplay between the soprano and alto, the bass is introduced with a statement of the subject, completing the exposition. The modulatory section begins in the minor key; a brief return to the tonic key provides a breath of calm before an increasingly rapid series of modulations. These lead to a climax in A major, signaled by a dominant pedal, but this lasts just four bars before the music plunges into C major. The music then settles down, gently leading to the recapitulation, where a single statement of the subject in the tonic key brings the piece to a close. |
| 8 | F♯ minor | Jewish influences are evident in both the short, agitated prelude, with its staccato and chromatic textures amplifying the melody, and the massive fugue in three voices increases in intensity as it progresses towards a final resolution with its Picardy third end. |
| 9 | E major | The prelude is written on three staves where left and right hands take turns playing on the center staff. The piece with few exceptions consists of unison quindicesima (two octaves apart) melodies beginning first in the lowest tessitura of the piano then the highest. Mixed meters riddle the contour of the simple melodies, and toward the middle, an alto voice of accompanying chords provides diversity to the unison melody. The fugue in 3/4 time is a frantic scurry with fast notes and staccato markings. Only two voices develop with increasing stretto in the middle culminating at the end when the two voices join in unison as before in the prelude though only with an octave separation. |
| 10 | C♯ minor | Like the previous fugue, the prelude (tempo Allegro) is written in the style of a two-part invention with a lively dialogue between the two hands. The polyphony is interrupted three times by a chorale setting in the low register of the piano. The prelude concludes with a flourish of 16th notes in the upper register, the last four notes leading directly into the fugue. The fugue is in four voices in a 3/4 Moderato tempo. The fugue, with its lyrical theme and rich counterpoint, invites comparison to Bach's D♯ minor fugue from the Well-Tempered Clavier, Book I. Shostakovich explores more remote minor keys (such as D minor, A minor, C minor and G minor) in the middle section before smoothly transitioning back to the home key of C♯ minor. In the last section of the fugue, Shostakovich uses traditional Baroque contrapuntal practices such as stretto and long pedals on the dominant and tonic. |
| 11 | B major | In the prelude elements of a simple folk melody are subverted into something humorous and unpredictable. The fugue, a virtuosic Hopak folk dance, follows straight on from the prelude in similar mood, this time anticipating the finale of the Tenth Symphony. It modulates freely throughout, abruptly returning to the tonic key at the end. |
| 12 | G♯ minor | The prelude is a passacaglia, a form Shostakovich had previously used in the third movement of his Violin Concerto No. 1 in A minor (Op. 77). The passacaglia motif is counterpointed by a single melody. It ends with the first statement of the fugue subject concealed in the bass, anticipating the four-part marcatissimo fugue. In 5/4, this fugue is a rhythmically complex composition, a culmination of Part One of the cycle. |
| 13 | F♯ major | The prelude, mostly in 6/8 time, has a flowing song-like melody underpinned by more regular pulsing chords, which leads to an equally calm fugue, the only one in the set with five voices. The fugue is wide-ranging in its tonality and uses many of the formal techniques of pure fugal writing, such as stretti, augmentation and diminution. Peter Donohoe has called it "unpianistic", but at the same time "one of the most profoundly beautiful piano works of the 20th century". |
| 14 | E♭ minor | Octave tremolos feature prominently in this 7/4 Adagio. In contrast, the lighter fugue is free-flowing with few dissonances. This pair reverses the usual scheme of short prelude and longer fugue. |
| 15 | D♭ major | The prelude is a waltz typical of Shostakovich. The vivace fugue is highly chromatic and verges on atonal. The subject contains 11 of the 12 semitones available, with the twelfth only introduced at the very end of the fugue. Ronald Stevenson has suggested this to be a sardonic commentary on serial music, as by the end of the piece tonic/dominant harmony is finally established, though not very convincingly. |
| 16 | B♭ minor | The prelude is a chaconne in the form of a theme, three variations and a coda, which descends in its final phrases to the lowest octaves of the piano. The subject of the three voice fugue is extended, asymmetric and full of melisma, and is developed into a series of "elegiac arabesques". |
| 17 | A♭ major | The prelude begins with a naive folk-like melody first stated in the bass with arpeggios above. Towards the end, the bass and treble play the melody together in plangent thirteenths. The four-voice fugue, in 5/4 time throughout, is full of insistent rhythmic patterns and uses just about every fugal technique available—most obviously the augmented subject hammered-out in the left hand towards the end. It follows in the Slavic tradition of flowing music in five time. |
| 18 | F minor | A long, florid melody opens this prelude, then the mode darkens and the pace slows to adagio for an intense short interlude before the melody returns. The simple fugue subject, characterized by the rhythm of a crotchet and two quavers, makes for a translucent opening, but tonal wanderings and conflicts between minor and major intensify the mood until the calm F major resolution. |
| 19 | E♭ major | The short prelude contrasts the chorale-like opening section with undercutting interruptions. The fugue, in three voices and once again with a 5/4 time signature, has a highly chromatic subject with angular, stuttering rhythms. Alternating dynamics mark the rising and falling tension, but the harmonies remain uncompromising, close to atonalism right through until there is something of a tonal resolution at the end. |
| 20 | C minor | A somber prelude, associated for Woodward with the bleak landscape of Russian steppe, and in a similar mood to the musical landscape of the opening movement of the Eleventh Symphony, composed six years later. The fugue, in four voices, is in a similar vein, but a little faster. |
| 21 | B♭ major | In the prelude, the right hand has an uninterrupted moto perpetuo stream of sixteenth notes, set against quarter and eighth notes in the left hand. The three-voice fugue is lively, marked "Allegro non troppo", using many fourths and sevenths in the harmony as well as unpredictable phrase lengths that constantly overlap the bar lines |
| 22 | G minor | The quaver configurations of paired notes over a relentlessly treading chordal accompaniment remain consistent throughout this prelude. The main subject of the four voice fugue remains calm throughout despite wide ranging modulations. |
| 23 | F major | Roger Woodward describes the "poignant intervallic juxtapositions of alto and tenor voices" throughout the prelude. This is followed by a fugue with another highly extended subject, which unfolds "in finely sculpted legato cantabile." |
| 24 | D minor | The long double fugue shares a key signature and several features with and references to the final fugue from Bach's The Art of Fugue. The first subject. hinted at in the prelude, is introduced quietly, but the fugue speeds up when the second subject is introduced, and forceful final notes, an extended Picardy third that recalls the triumphant end of the Fifth Symphony conclude the piece and the cycle. This fugue uses just about all the contrapuntal resources available: double stretto, cancrizan, augmentation, diminution, pedal point and invertible counterpoint. The final page has been described as "an object lesson in scoring, in which every register of the modern grand piano is craftily deployed to maximize sonority". |

== Reception ==
Before premiering the work, Shostakovich privately performed the first half of the cycle before the Union of Composers (as was typical with new compositions during the Soviet Era) on 31 March 1951. The panel expressed great displeasure at the dissonance in some of the fugues, labelling the work as an example of formalism.

This work is considered by many (e.g. music critic Alex Ross, musicologist Tanya Ursova, et al.) to be produced by the "other Shostakovich," or as a composition "for the desk drawer." According to Ross, the composer used chamber forms in the period to channel his most personal compositions, those that would not be suitable for use or approval by the Soviet government. This work is included in that group along with several string quartets.

== Recordings ==
Shostakovich recorded 18 of the 24 pieces at five recording sessions in 1951–1952, 1956 and 1958 (EMI). He never recorded Nos. 9, 10, 11, 15, 19 or 21 but he recorded Nos. 1, 4, 5, 6, 13, 14, 18, 23 and 24 twice by doing the recording for EMI.

Tatiana Nikolayeva recorded complete sets four times, in 1962, 1987 (both originally issued by Melodiya), 1990 (Hyperion Records) and in 1992 as a filmed performance (Medici Arts). The 1962 and 1987 recordings have been reissued on several labels. She also recorded Nos. 1, 7 and 15 in 1952–1953.

Roger Woodward made the first complete recording available in the West in 1975; it was reissued on CD in September 2010 by Celestial Harmonies. Other notable complete recordings include:

- Vladimir Ashkenazy
- Yulianna Avdeeva
- Peter Donohoe
- David Jalbert
- Keith Jarrett
- Igor Levit
- Jenny Lin
- Hannes Minnaar
- Olli Mustonen
- Konstantin Scherbakov
- Craig Sheppard

== Bibliography ==
- Donohoe, Peter (2017). Notes to CD 396. Signum Classics.
- Fay, Laurel (1999). Shostakovich: A Life. Oxford University Press. ISBN 0-19-513438-9.
- Ledbetter, David (2002). Bach's Well-Tempered Clavier: The 48 Preludes and Fugues. Yale University Press. ISBN 0-300-09707-7.
- Mazullo, Mark (2010). Shostakovich's Preludes and Fugues: Contexts, Style, Performance. Yale University Press. ISBN 978-0-300-14943-2.
- Mellers, Wilfrid (1992). Notes to CD 1469/70. ECM.
- Norris, Christopher (1982). Shostakovich: The Man and his Music. Lawrence & Wishart. ISBN 978-0-853-155027.
- Ross, Alex (2008). The Rest Is Noise. Picador. ISBN 978-0-312-42771-9.
- Plutalov, Denis (2010). Dmitry Shostakovich's Twenty-Four Preludes and Fugues, op. 87: An analysis and critical evaluation of the printed edition based on the composer's recorded performance (PhD). University of Nebraska Press.
- Woodward, Roger (1975). Notes to CD 14302-2. Celestial Harmonies.
- Ursova, Tanya (January 2005). "Shostakovich's 24 Preludes and Fugues, Op. 87: Subtexts in Context". DSCH Journal. 22.
