= Azkoul =

Azkoul is a surname. Notable people with the surname include:

- Jad Azkoul, Lebanese teacher and guitarist, son of Karim
- Karim Azkoul (born 1915), Lebanese philosopher and diplomat
