= Mitzi Meyerson =

Harpsichordist and photographer

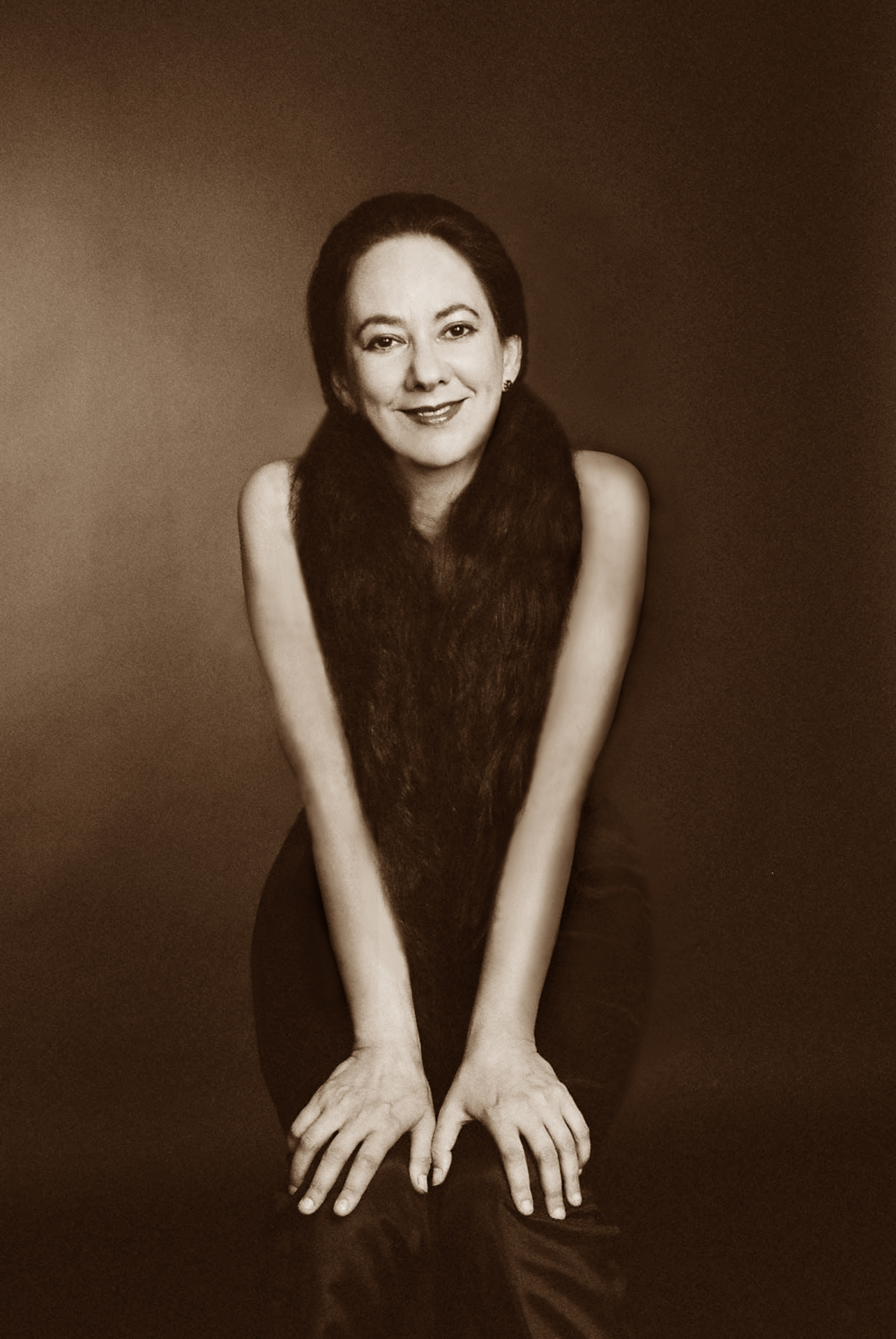
- Born: Chicago, Illinois, United States
- Occupation(s): Harpsichordist, educator, photographer
- Known for: French Baroque music interpretation and recording

Mitzi Meyerson is an American harpsichordist and photographer.

== Biography ==
Mitzi Meyerson divides her time between her research, a busy teaching schedule, and concert engagements throughout the world. In addition to her concerts and recordings, she has taught hundreds of students over the last thirty years, many of whom went on to be successful artists in their own right.

Mitzi Meyerson has many outside interests. She is a certified doula (birth assistant), has been a university lecturer on doula training, and has personally assisted at dozens of births. She has a keen love of photography and has been featured in several successful one-woman shows in Germany and England.

In 2009, the City of Chicago honored her by opening 'Mitzi Meyerson Way,' located outside her alma mater, Roosevelt University.

== Performing ==
She was born into a musical family in Chicago, Illinois, where she began her concert career at the age of seven. After completing her university and graduate studies in Chicago and Oberlin, Ohio, she moved to London to co-found the ensemble 'Trio Sonnerie' (with Monica Huggett and Sarah Cunningham), with whom she performed and recorded extensively.

As a harpsichord soloist, she has toured throughout the United States, Europe, and the Far East.

== Recordings ==
Mitzi Meyerson specializes in researching little-known or lost works for the harpsichord, which she then brings to light in recordings.

For example, she discovered the lost collection of "Chamber Airs for the Violin (and Thorough Bass)" by Richard Jones, a composer in London at the time of Handel. The world première recording of these works was released in 2011 on the Glossa Music label.

Ms. Meyerson has released over sixty recordings. In addition to the partial list (below), she has collaborated with leading Baroque specialists to record chamber music by Johann Sebastian Bach, Arcangelo Corelli, Antoine Forqueray, Gaspar Le Roux, Jean-Marie Leclair, Henry Purcell, Jean-Philippe Rameau, Giovanni Battista Somis, and Georg Phillipp Telemann; as well as orchestral music of Alessandro Scarlatti and Antonio Vivaldi.

=== Solo Harpsichord ===
- Joseph Anton Steffan: Harpsichord Sonatas, (2021). Named "Instrumental Choice" by BBC Music Magazine.
- John Jones: Eight Setts of Lessons for the Harpsichord (2014). Reviewed in Gramophone and Early Music Review.
- Richard Jones (composer): Complete works for harpsichord (2010). Named "CD of the Month" by Toccata magazine; "Editor′s Choice" in Concerto Magazine; Gramophone (magazine) described it as "the best harpsichord disc of the year." Also reviewed in International Record Review and Audiophile Audition.
- Dietrich Buxtehude: Suites and Variations for Harpsichord (2006).
- Gottlieb Muffat: Componenti Musicali per il Cembalo (2009). Reviewed in Gramophone.
- François Couperin: Les Ombres Errantes: Suites for the Harpsichord (2005). Reviewed in Gramophone.
- Claude Balbastre: Musique de Salon (2004). Awarded the Deutsche Schallplatten Kritik prize for the best recordings of the year on an international level.
- Johann Caspar Ferdinand Fischer: The Daughters of Zeus, Musikalischer Parnassus (2002). Awarded Diapason d'Or, and named BBC Critics Choice.
- Jacques Duphly: Pièces pour Clavecin (1986). Reviewed in Gramophone.
- Georg Böhm: Harpsichord works.(2003) Awarded the Deutsche Schallplatten Kritik prize for the best recordings of the year on an international level. Reviewed in Gramophone.

=== Chamber Music ===
- François Francœur: Sonates à violon seul et basse continue with Kreeta-Maria Kentala, violin; Lauri Pulakka, cello (2018) Reviewed in MusicWeb International.
- Marin Marais: Le Labyrinthe, Pièces de caractère with Paolo Pandolfo, viola da gamba; Thomas Boysen, theorbo and baroque guitar (1999). Reviewed in Gramophone.

In addition to the awards listed above, her CD prizes include the Choc award from Monde de la Musique, and the Diapason d'Or from Diapason (magazine).

Mitzi Meyerson has discovered several additional collections of completely unknown works. She continues to do active research in this field.

== Teaching ==
Ms. Meyerson was a full professor of historical keyboard instruments (harpsichord and fortepiano) at the Universität der Künste in Berlin. This position was specially created for Madame Wanda Landowska, making this university the first institution in modern times to offer harpsichord studies.
