= Tatiana Nikolayeva =

Soviet and Russian pianist (1924–1993)

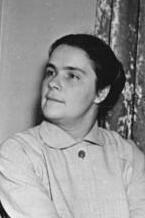
Nikolayeva in 1956

Tatiana Petrovna Nikolayeva (Russian: Татьяна Петровна Николаева, romanized: Tatyana Petrovna Nikolaeva; May 4, 1924 – November 22, 1993) was a Soviet and Russian pianist, composer, and teacher.

== Life ==
Nikolayeva was born in Bezhitsa, in the Bryansk district, on May 4, 1924. Her mother was a professional pianist and studied at the Moscow Conservatory under the renowned pedagogue Aleksandr Goldenweiser, and her father was an amateur violinist and cellist. In 1950, Nikolayeva won first prize in the International Johann Sebastian Bach Competition in Leipzig, which was founded to mark the bicentenary of Bach's death in 1750. Dmitri Shostakovich, who was a member of the jury, composed and dedicated the 24 Preludes and Fugues, Op. 87, to her: it remained an important part of her piano repertoire.

She sat as a jury member on international competitions such as the Paloma O'Shea Santander International Piano Competition, the International Tchaikovsky Competition and the Leeds Piano Competition. She recorded her own transcription of Sergei Prokofiev's Peter and the Wolf. Nikolayeva was the teacher of Nikolai Lugansky. Among her other students were András Schiff, whom she taught in summer courses at the Hochschule für Musik Franz Liszt, Weimar, and Michael Korstick, whom she taught during her master classes at Musikhochschule Cologne, Germany.

She died on November 22, 1993, in San Francisco, nine days after succumbing to a brain haemorrhage during a performance of one of the Op. 87 fugues at the Herbst Theatre.

As James Campbell-Methuen commented in her obituary, "Aside from the Shostakovich, though, Tatiana Nikolayeva will be remembered as a Bach player who flung stylistic considerations to the winds and played the music with an irrepressible musical intelligence and knowledge of the resources of her chosen instrument."

== Partial repertoire ==
- Preludes, Op. 34 (Shostakovich)
- 24 Preludes and Fugues, Op. 87 (Shostakovich)
- Piano Concerto No. 1 (Tchaikovsky)
- Piano Concerto No. 2 (Shostakovich)

== Compositions ==
- Violin Concerto (1972)
- Symphony (1955; rev. 1958)
- 24 Concert Études, Op. 13, in all major and minor keys (1951–53)
- Piano Quintet (1947)
