= Karim Azkoul =

Lebanese politician (1915–2003)

Karim Azkoul (Arabic: کریم عزقول) was a Lebanese diplomat and philosopher born in Rashaya, then part of the Ottoman Empire on July 15, 1915. His most notable achievements include his participation in the original writing of the Universal Declaration of Human Rights.

== Personal life ==
Azkoul married Eva Corey in 1947. They had a son and a daughter. Their son, Jad Azkoul is a world-renowned classical guitarist. Azkoul has a grandson who is a rapper by the name of Dr Koul.

Azkoul's leisures included reading and writing.

== Education ==
Azkoul attended the Jesuit University of St Joseph in Beirut, and later the Universities of Paris, Berlin, Bonn and Munich.

== Career ==
Azkoul was a professor of history, Arab and French literature and philosophy in various colleges in Lebanon from 1939 to 1946. He was the Director of an Arabic publishing house and monthly Arabic review The Arab World in Beirut from 1943 to 1945.

As Lebanon's representative at the United Nations' talks on Human Rights at the time of their establishment, Azkoul contributed to their wording and significance. There, he is known to have worked closely alongside Charles Malik.

He was Rapporteur of the Committee on Genocide in 1948, and was an ally of Raphael Lemkin in arguing for the creation of the Genocide Convention against certain members (notably England) who were trying to declare it redundant, claiming the existence of Nuremberg trials were sufficient.

Other work of his with the U.N. includes having been Acting Permanent Delegate to the U.N. from 1950 to 1953 and Head of U.N. Affairs Department (Ministry of Foreign Affairs of Lebanon) from 1953 to 1957.

On 10 November 1950, he was photographed at a U.N. radio alongside René Cassin, Georges Day and Herald C.L. Roy, participating in a roundtable discussion for the use of French-speaking countries.

He went on to become the Head Permanent Delegation to the U.N. from 1957 to 1959. He was photographed shaking hands with Dag Hammarskjöld (then U.N. Secretary General) when receiving his credentials there in 1958.

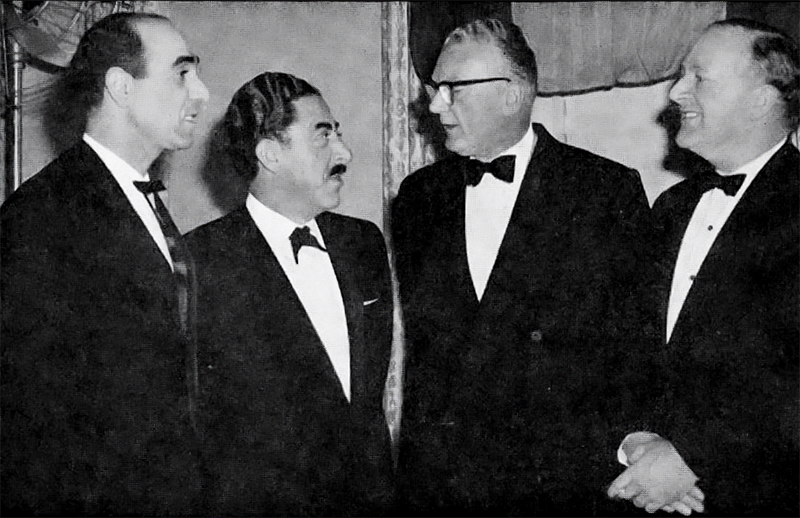
Karim Azkoul (second from the left) alongside Mr. Rudolph Aboukhater, Mr. Le Marchand and Mr. Desmond Fennessy on the cover of 'Overseas Trading', 1961.

From 1959 to 1961, Azkoul was Consul General of Lebanon in Australia and New Zealand. From 1961 to 1964, he was ambassador to Ghana, Guinea and Mali, and to Iran and Afghanistan from 1964 to 1966.

Azkoul was a journalist from 1966 to 1968 before teaching as professor of philosophy at the Beirut College for Women from 1968 to 1972. In 1970 to 1972 he was a professor of philosophy at the Lebanese University.

In 1978, he was chief editor of The Joy of Knowledge (Arabic Encyclopaedia) and responsible for ten volumes therein.

He is also credited as having been vice chair to the Committee for Defence of Human Rights in Lebanon and member of the board of trustees, BD of Man. of Theological School of Balamand, Lebanon. Likewise as PEN, Emergency World Council, Hague in 1971.

Azkoul featured as an actor in a full-length film entitled Le Voyage étranger by Serge Roullet, released in 1992. Azkoul plays the role of "Le viel homme", or "the old man".

== Character ==
Azkoul was described by Raphael Lemkin, coiner of the term Genocide, as having had a "philosophical mind" whose voice carried "firmness and conviction", not being afraid of defending small nations' interests against the superpowers of his day.

== Politics and philosophy ==
=== Anti-zionism ===
Karim Azkoul was an advocate of Pan-Arabism and was firmly anti-Zionist who often spoke out against foreign national intervention in the Middle East. He predicted that tensions would worsen if the United States continued to increase its military presence in the region. He also maintained that Lebanon (and the rest of the Arab world) was well on its way towards genuine democracy, as long as the western powers did not act against United Nations wishes when involving itself in the region's politics.

=== Right to asylum ===
Azkoul fought for a complete definition of the right to seek and be granted asylum in the U.N. Declaration of Human Rights. Because he was a representative of Lebanon at that time, some scholars argue that the country cannot now call itself "no country of asylum" as this would be ignoring Azkoul's efforts in his diplomatic capacity at the time.

=== Freedom of information ===
Azkoul believed strongly in the freedom of the press and advocated for the formation of national information agencies.

=== The purpose of the U.N. ===
During his time at the United Nations, one of Azkoul's objectives was to keep the organization on track with what he considered to be one of its most important goals: to defend the weaker nations against the most powerful.

=== On communism ===
Azkoul never expressed any political alignment in the communist/capitalist debate and refused to be swept into British and American anticommunist rhetoric.

== Quotes ==
"Big nations can protect themselves with arms, but our only protection is international law."

"There is the feeling in Lebanon that the anticommunism of the Middle East comes largely from the influence of the United States and Britain."

“Everyone has the right to seek and to be granted asylum during persecution.”

== Awards and recognition ==
Azkoul was awarded the National Order of the Cedar, Lebanon, the Order of the Holy Sepulchre, Jerusalem, the Order of Saint Marc, Alexandria, the Order of The Brilliant Star, Republic of China, the Order of Southern Star, Brazil and the Order of Saint Peter and Paul, Damascus.

== Publications ==
Reason and Faith in Islam (German), 1938. Reason in Islam (Arabic), 1946. Freedom (co-author), 1956. Freedom of Association (U.N.), 1968

Translated into Arabic: Consciencism (Nkrumah), 1964. Arab Thought In The Liberal Age (Albert Hourani), 1969
