= Ariadne musica =

Ariadne musica is a collection of organ music by Johann Caspar Ferdinand Fischer, first published in 1702. The main part of the collection is a cycle of 20 preludes and fugues in different keys, so Ariadne musica is considered an important precursor to Johann Sebastian Bach's The Well-Tempered Clavier, which has a similar structure.

The title refers to the Greek myth in which Theseus finds his way out of Minotaur's labyrinth using a ball of thread that Ariadne, daughter of King Minos of Crete, gave him. Similarly, the music in the collection can be said to guide the listener through a labyrinth of keys. Fischer also used Greek mythology to name the pieces in another large scale music collection of his, Musikalischer Parnassus.

The first edition of Ariadne musica was made in 1702 in Schlackenwerth. The work was reprinted several times during Fischer's life. The original print mentioned by Johann Gottfried Walther in Musicalisches Lexicon is now lost, but a manuscript copy survives.

== Pieces ==
20 preludes and fugues:

- Prelude & Fugue No. 1 in C major
- Prelude & Fugue No. 2 in C♯ minor
- Prelude & Fugue No. 3 in D minor
- Prelude & Fugue No. 4 in D major
- Prelude & Fugue No. 5 in E♭ major
- Prelude & Fugue No. 6 in E Phrygian
- Prelude & Fugue No. 7 in E
- Prelude & Fugue No. 8 in E major
- Prelude & Fugue No. 9 in F minor
- Prelude & Fugue No. 10 in F major
- Prelude & Fugue No. 11 in F♯ minor
- Prelude & Fugue No. 12 in G minor
- Prelude & Fugue No. 13 in G major
- Prelude & Fugue No. 14 in A♭ major
- Prelude & Fugue No. 15 in A minor
- Prelude & Fugue No. 16 in A major
- Prelude & Fugue No. 17 in B♭ major
- Prelude & Fugue No. 18 in B minor
- Prelude & Fugue No. 19 in B major
- Prelude & Fugue No. 20 in C minor

5 ricercars on chorale melodies, each connected with a specific Catholic event:

- Ricercar pro Tempore Adventus, in C major (on Ave Maria klare, for Advent)
- Ricercar pro Festis Natalitys, in C major (on Der Tag der ist so freudenreich, for Christmas)
- Ricercar pro Tempore Quadragesimae, in E Phrygian (on Da Jesus an dem Kreuze stund, for Lent)
- Ricercar pro Festis Paschalibus, in D minor (on Christ ist erstanden, for Easter)
- Ricercar pro Festis Pentecostalibus, in F major (on Komm, heiliger Geist, for Pentecost)

All pieces are quite short, including a few really brief fugues (the seven bar A minor fugue being the shortest). Most are in common time, with a few exceptions (most notably the E fugue which is in 12/8). The preludes vary from pieces based on short simplistic toccata-like passages over long sustained chords (as in, for example, the C major and G major ones) to slightly more complex works with brief imitative passages like this one, from the end of the E♭ major prelude:

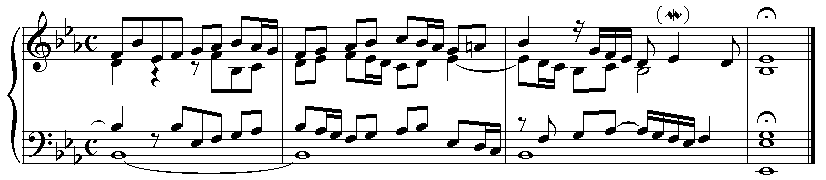
The last four bars of the E♭ major prelude from Ariadne musica

The fugues are all in four voices, the only exception being the A♭ major with a fifth part doubling the octave in the last chord. Some are loosely connected thematically to the accompanying preludes. The ricercars all feature themes written in whole and half notes, the C major Ricercar pro Festis Natalitys being one notable exception with the theme composed mostly of quarter and eighth notes. Three are marked alla breve, Ricercar pro Festis Natalitys is in common time and the F major ricercar is in 3/2.

Ricercar pro Festis Paschalibus was previously attributed to Johann Sebastian Bach and listed in the BWV catalogue as BWV 746, chorale prelude Christ ist erstanden.

== Connection with Johann Sebastian Bach ==
The most obvious connection of Bach's Well-Tempered Clavier with Ariadne Musica is Bach's use of Fischer's subject in one of the fugues:

Opening bars of the E major fugue from Ariadne musica

The six-note subject of the E major four-voice fugue by Fischer (opening bars pictured above, subject highlighted) is used by Bach as the subject of the E major fugue from the second volume of the Well-Tempered Clavier, BWV878/2, also in four voices:

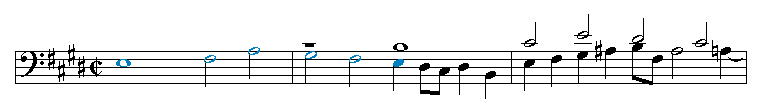

Fischer's piece is quite short (although not as short as, for instance, the 8 bar E Phrygian fugue from the same collection) and written predominantly using long note values; Bach's fugue is much more complex, with dense counterpoint and also much longer - although Fischer's subject makes it into one of the few pieces from the WTC that feature a significant amount of whole and half-notes in all voices. The same six-note subject is found in two 17th century keyboard compositions by the famous Johann Jakob Froberger: Fantasia No. 2 and Ricercar No. 4. The latter's opening bars can be seen below (with the inverted version of the same theme shown in dark pink):

The opening bars of Froberger's Ricercar No. 4; the six-note theme is shown in blue, its inverted form is shown in dark pink

Fischer might have learned the theme from Froberger. Additionally, Fischer's E♭ major fugue and Bach's G minor fugue from Book 1 share a similar structure concerning the use of countersubjects; the subject of Bach's fugue is a slightly modified version of Fischer's. Both Bach's and Fischer's C major fugues are heavily based on stretto and their subjects are somewhat similar rhythmically.

== Recordings ==
Ariadne musica is rarely performed or recorded, although individual preludes and fugues frequently appear on miscellaneous compilations of Baroque organ music. The following recordings feature at least one part of Ariadne musica (preludes and fugues or ricercars) in full:

- Johann Caspar Ferdinand Fischer: Ariadne musica, Wolfgang Baumgratz, Christophorus 1992 (complete recording)
- German Organ Music vol. 1, Joseph Payne, 1994. Naxos 550964. (on three different organs, ricercars not included)
- Johann Caspar Ferdinand Fischer: Blumen-Strauss: Complete Organ Works, Serge Schoonbroodt, 2002. AEOLUS AE-10321. (complete recording)
- A Joy Forever: Opus 41 at Goshen College, Bradley Lehman, 2006. LaripS 1002. (complete recording)
- J.K.F. Fischer: Ariadne Musica (20 Preludes & Fugues); works of Caldara, Bach, Beethoven, & Sorge, Franz Haselböck. Musical Heritage Society MHS 1634.

== See also ==
- Music written in all major or minor keys
