= Le Voyage étranger =

1992 film

Le Voyage étranger is a 1992 film by Serge Roullet featuring Karim Azkoul. The film is a retelling of the story of St. Alexis.
