= Prelude No. 1 (Villa-Lobos) =

Guitar piece by Heitor Villa-Lobos

Prelude No. 1 is a guitar piece written by Brazilian composer Heitor Villa-Lobos.

== Music ==
The piece is subtitled "Melodia lírica" (Lyrical Melody), is in E minor, marked "Andantino espressivo", and is the first of the Five Preludes, written in 1940. The others are in E major, A minor, E minor, and D major. It was first performed, together with its four companions, by Abel Carlevaro in Montevideo on 11 December 1942.

This piece follows a ternary form which consists of a slow, yearning A section in E minor. The B section is more upbeat and lively in the key of E major.

== Discography ==
The composer himself once recorded this prelude:

- Villa-Lobos, O Intérprete. Prelude No. 1 and Chôros No. 1 (Villa-Lobos, guitar); Chôros No. 5, A lenda do caboclo, and "Polichinelo" from A prole do bebe (Villa-Lobos, piano; "Um canto que saiu das senzalas", "Guriata do coqueiro", "Nhapopê", and "Xangô" (Beate Roseroiter, soprano; Villa-Lobos, piano). Caravelle LP MEC/MVL 002.
