= Abraham van den Kerckhoven =

Flemish composer and organist

Abraham van den Kerckhoven (c. 1618 – c. 1701) was a Flemish organist and composer. He was active in Brussels, working as organist at the local Saint Catherine's Church and as court organist. He was held in high regard by his contemporaries. A single collection of his works survives, containing numerous short versets and several longer works for organ, displaying his mastery of counterpoint and revealing the influence of various other composers, particularly Peeter Cornet.

== Biography ==
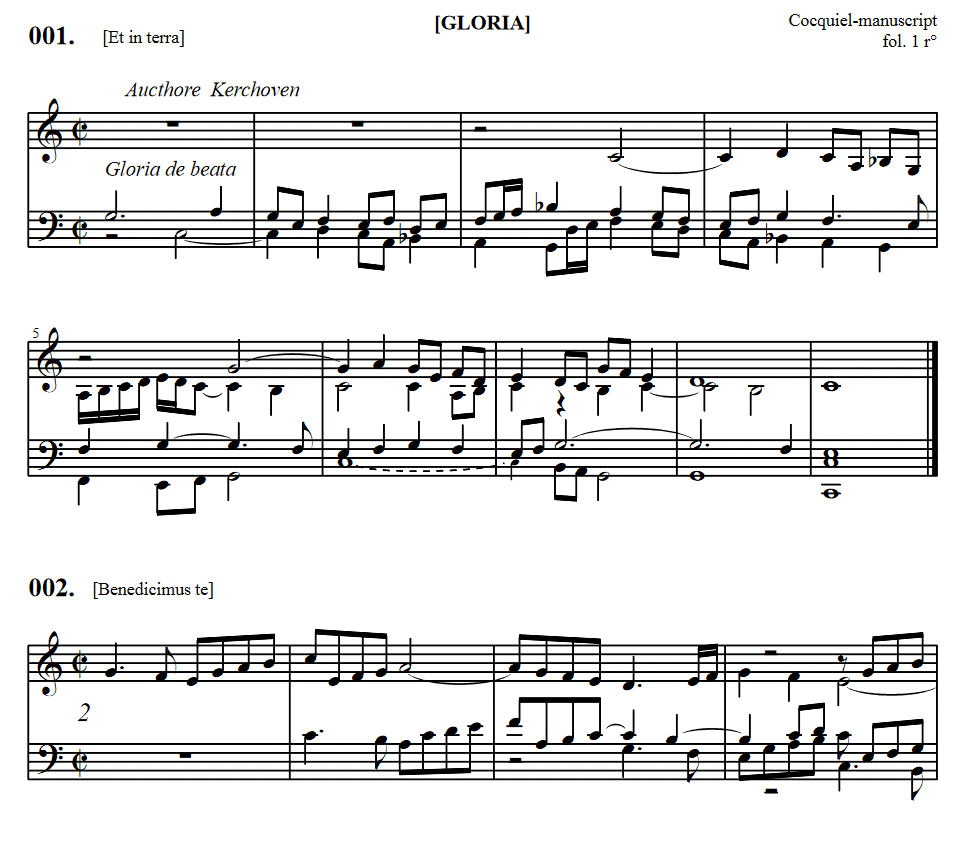
First bars of 'Gloria' from the Cocquiel manuscript

The exact date and place of van den Kerckhoven's birth is unknown. It is likely that he was born around 1618. The van den Kerckhoven family, which was active in Brussels as early as the late 16th century, included many distinguished artists, singers, and organists. Several van den Kerckhovens served at the royal chapel, and many were organists at local churches.

From about 1632 Abraham was working in Brussels as second organist at the Saint Catherine's Church (Sint-Katharinakerk or Sint-Katerijnekerk), and in 1634 he became first organist of the same church, succeeding one François Cornet. Van den Kerckhoven held the position for almost 70 years, until his death in late 1701. He was apparently able to combine it with working as chamber organist for Archduke Leopold Wilhelm of Austria from 1648 to 1656, and as court organist from 1656 to 1684 (and possibly for some time after 1684). When he worked as chamber organist, his salary was small compared to other chamber musicians, and his services were probably not called upon too frequently; however, as court organist he received a much larger salary and was almost definitely first organist. There still exists some small doubt over whether Abraham the court organist and Abraham the organist of Saint Catherine's are the same person. The latter, at any rate, died around Christmas 1701, and was buried on 9 January 1702; the records of the funeral service only refer to him as the church's organist.

Van den Kerckhoven married Joanna (Jenno) Baert in Brussels in 1646. They had 10 children, of whom at least three became musicians. Jan (Jan-Baptist, Joannes, or abbrev.: Joes.), the eldest son, worked as court singer and organist in Brussels from 1703 to 1707. He is recorded as a singer at Saint Catherine's in 1691 and succeeded his father as the organist of the same church in 1702. Finally, Philips (Jan-Philips) is recorded as singer at Saint Catherine's in 1707.

== Works ==
Most of his works were found in 1905 in a hand-written volume of organ pieces dated 1741 and compiled by Jacobus Ignatius Josephus Cocquiel, organist and priest of the Saint Vincentius Church in Soignies. This manuscript is sometimes referred to as the Cocquiel manuscript and is currently in possession of the Royal Library of Belgium in Brussels, catalogue number Ms II 3326. Van den Kerckhoven's works were published for the first time in 1933 by J. Watelet as the second volume of the Monumenta musicae Belgicae series; in 1982 a facsimile of the Cocquiel manuscript was published with an introduction by Godelieve Spiessens, and this edition is commonly used now.

Van den Kerckhoven's surviving oeuvre consists mostly of organ pieces: fantasies, fugues, preludes, mass settings and other works. His music is influenced by Italian and French styles; fugues and fantasias are reminiscent of Johann Jakob Froberger and quite a few pieces contain typical French registration indications: pieces for plein-jeu, fantasies pour cornet, for cromorne or dessus de tierce. Sectional preludes with alternating free and imitative counterpoint, harmonically rich and expansive, are reminiscent of the northern German organ tradition.
