= Prelude No. 3 (Villa-Lobos) =

Guitar piece by Heitor Villa-Lobos

Prelude No. 3 is a guitar piece written by Brazilian composer Heitor Villa-Lobos.

The piece is subtitled "Homenagem a Bach" (Homage to Bach), is in the key of A minor, marked "Andante", and is the third of the Five Preludes, written in 1940. The others are in E minor, E major, E minor, and D major. It was first performed, together with its four companions, by Abel Carlevaro in Montevideo on 11 December 1942.

The distinctive sound quality of this prelude relies on the open strings of the guitar. The connection to Johann Sebastian Bach is found principally in the second main section, with its patterns of descending melodic sequences and clear tonal harmonies.
