= Joseph Gibbs (composer) =

English composer

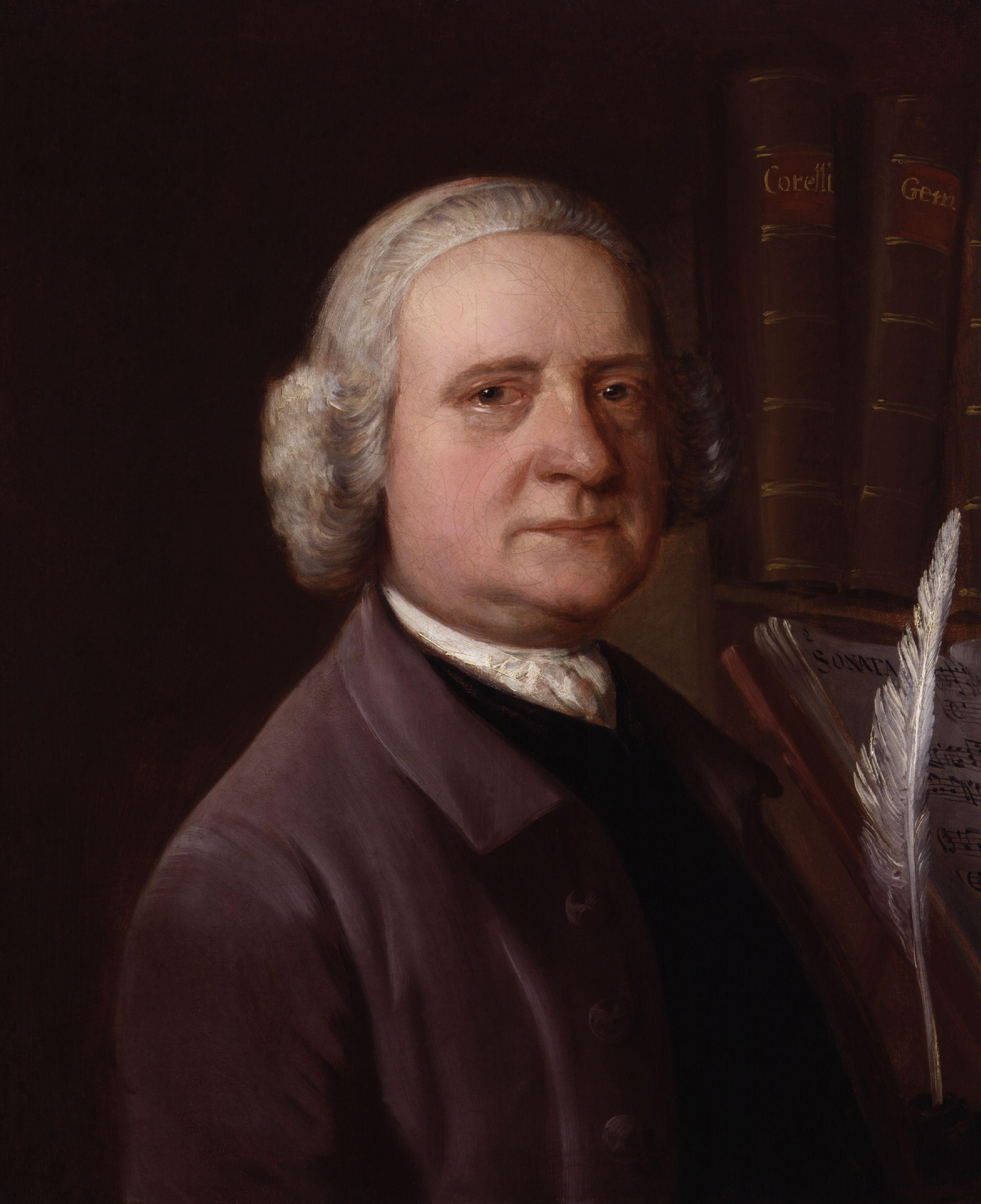
Portrait of Joseph Gibbs by Thomas Gainsborough, circa 1755

Joseph Gibbs (23 December 1698 – 12 December 1788), was an English composer. He was not prolific, but he was not entirely unknown.

== Biography ==
Gibbs was born in Dedham, Essex to John Gibbs and Judith Gibbs. He had an older brother, Edward, born four years before. Little is known of his life, until 1748, when he was appointed organist at the Church of St. Mary-le-Tower, Ipswich, and his first published work, Eight solos for violin with a thorough bass, appeared.

Only one other work (six quartettos) is known to have been published in the remaining forty years of his active musical life.

The purchase of a Gainsborough in 1928 by the National Portrait Gallery created a renewed interest in Joseph Gibbs. This painting of Gibbs was hitherto unknown and handed down through generations of Gibbs's family who were the only ones aware of its existence. Ipswich had a lively Music Club in which Thomas Gainsborough (1727–1788) was a keen and passionate member. It is during this period that Gainsborough painted a portrait of his friend Joseph Gibbs. In the background of this portrait are two volumes. One is titled Corelli and the other Gem (presumably Francesco Geminiani). Acknowledgement of these names in a portrait speaks profoundly of the sitter's projections towards the violin. As noted by the English-German violinist Rachel J. Harris, the music on the stand is identical in layout and page number (apart to some missing accidentals) to a sonata by Michael Festing, Op 7 no. 1, published in 1744 where Gibbs is listed as a subscriber. At Christchurch Mansion is another painting attributed to Gainsborough. This is on the case of the grandfather clock, assumedly of the convivial Music Club, amongst whom one can recognize Joseph Gibbs in sober grey, seated at a table with a glass in front of him. The Music Club met in the home of a Mr. Sparrowe, which is now known as the Ancient House in the Buttermarket.

Gibbs was often called upon as the local musician of standing for various occasions. A newly erected organ at Eye in Suffolk was to be opened in 1749 by "Mr. Joseph Gibbs, Organist of Ipswich ... And in the Evening will be a CONCERT of Vocal and Instrumental Musick ... And after the CONCERT there will be a BALL."

At the time of Gibbs's appointment as organist, Ipswich was an important and flourishing centre. It was also garrisoned by the Scots Greys. Undoubtedly, with his active musical and social life, Gibbs was in contact with the Scots Greys and their music-making, for his Sonatas contain many references to Scottish song.

Joseph Gibbs was accorded a civic funeral and a band of the Scots Greys and East Suffolk Militia played the Dead March from Saul with their instruments draped in black crepe. The published obituary stated "His corpse was deposited in a grave in front of the organ". (Gentleman’s Magazine December 1788) Since the restoration of the Church in the 1860s no trace of his gravestone has been found. However, a dedication reads:

In Memory of Mr. Joseph Gibbs, who was forty years Organist of this Church. He was eminently distinguished in his profession both as a Composer and Performer. Having brought up a large Family and seen his Children’s Children to the fourth Generation, after a life of meekness and integrity. He died December 12th 1788, Aged 89 years.

== Major works ==
- Eight solos for a violin with a thorough bass
- Six Quartettos

== Discography ==
- The Eight Violin Sonatas: Portrait, Review & List of the pieces by Claudio Records
- Music Web Review by Jonathan Woolf
