= Michael Christian Festing =

English violinist and composer

Michael Christian Festing (29 November 1705 – 24 July 1752) was an English violinist and composer. His reputation lies mostly on his work as a violin virtuoso.

== Biography ==
Michael Christian Festing was born in London to parents John and Elizabeth Festing and christened at St Anne's Church, Soho, on 17 December 1705. Some evidence suggests that his family had ties to Gros Festin, near Stralsund in Mecklenburg-Vorpommern, Germany. Michael's brother, John Festing, was a flautist and oboist who amassed a sizeable fortune through teaching music. His brother is most likely the musician depicted in William Hogarth's painting The Enraged Musician (1741, now in the Tate Britain, London).

Festing first studied violin with Richard Jones and then later became a pupil of Francesco Geminiani. He made his professional debut on 6 March 1723 performing a concert at Hickford's Room, London. Not too long after that, Festing met a young Thomas Arne at the gallery of the Italian Opera to which Festing had access although Arne, still a boy, officially did not. Music historian Charles Burney wrote that Arne had crept into the gallery dressed as a liveryman to gain access to the fine collection of musical scores contained there. Upon befriending Festing, Arne became his pupil, studying violin for the first time and music composition. Festing, who was only four and a half years older, also broadened the young Arne's knowledge by taking him to numerous concerts, operas, and other performances. The teenagers were both present on 12 November 1725 to hear Thomas Roseingrave win the competition for the post of organist of St George's, Hanover Square. It is largely due to Festing's influence that Thomas's father allowed him to pursue a career in music instead of becoming a lawyer.

In the mid-1720s Festing began to compose music, mostly for the violin at the beginning but later works for orchestra, art songs, and a small amount of both sacred music and theatre music followed. The earliest mention of music composed by him is from a 1726 concert advertisement. That same year he helped found the Academy of Ancient Music, along with such composers as William Croft and Giovanni Bononcini, and participated in that group until he left over the Bononcini–Lotti affair in 1731. Festing remained active in concerts throughout London, notably replacing James Moore as a member of the King's Musick on 4 November 1726. His position at court led to the performance of three sets of his minuets for the birthdays of King George II and Queen Caroline, each "perform'd at the Ball at Court" in 1734 and 1735. Festing also performed several solo concerts in London, notably at the York Buildings, Villiers Street in 1729.

In 1730 Festing published his first composition, Twelve Solos for a Violin and Thorough Bass op. 1, which was dedicated to the Earl of Plymouth. In 1993 a manuscript of three of his opus 4 violin solos was discovered, which musicologists believe belonged to one of Festing's pupils and dates from the early 1730s. Festing became the director of the orchestra at the Italian opera house in 1737. The following year, along with Edward Purcell (eldest son of Henry Purcell), Thomas Arne, William Boyce, Johann Christoph Pepusch, and George Frideric Handel, he founded the Fund for the Support of Decay'd Musicians and their Families, later known as the Royal Society of Musicians; of which for many years he acted as honorary secretary.

In 1742 Festing was appointed musical director of the Ranelagh Gardens when they were first opened. While there he composed music for the entertainments in the pleasure garden and lead the band there until his death in London in 1752 aged 46. He had two sons and two daughters, and his son Michael (born 1725) married Maurice Greene's daughter, Katherine.

== Compositions ==
Festing was a moderately prolific composer producing a number of sonatas, minuets, concertos, chamber music, works for solo instrument, cantatas, vocal songs, catches, and odes. His music is often characterised by sudden and unusual modulations. His frequent use of key changes up or down a whole step and other dramatic modulations have caused several musicologists to compare his music to the Spanish harmonies of Domenico Scarlatti.

As a composer, Festing began his career writing in the Baroque style and then later transitioned into the galant style that came to be associated with the early Classical period of music. His earliest works were entirely instrumental pieces and employed typical baroque elements such as ground basses, canons at the octave and fugal treatments. Although more ambitious and adventurous than his mentor, Francesco Geminiani, close parallels are often made between Festing's early works and those of Geminiani. Two such comparisons are the similarity between the virtuoso improvisatory passages and the use of elaborate and detailed ornamentation of the solo parts in their works. Also of note is both composers's use of bowing, phrasing and ornamental marks in the bass lines of their writing, particularly in trio sonatas.

When Festing was appointed musical director of the Ranelagh Gardens in 1742, his work shifted more towards vocal works, although he did continue to produce several concertos and sonatas during this time. He had previously only written a handful of vocal compositions for performance at the Apollo Academy during the 1730s. At Ranelagh he became particularly known for his odes and cantatas which were unique in that they used extended aria forms, inventive orchestration, and dramatic gestures that were more English in character than in the Italian tradition. Of notable interest is his Ode on St Cecilia's Day which reflects the influence of Handel's oratorio Alexander's Feast, and his Ode on the Return of … the Duke of Cumberland which used a full Baroque orchestra including kettledrums, trumpets, oboes and horns. Festing also performed a number of vocal songs and cantatas at Ranelagh, the latter of which resemble those of John Stanley. The Complete Works, some 120, of Michael Christian Festing have been edited by Richard Divall and are freely available on application.

As noted by the English-German violinist Rachel J. Harris, music by Festing can be seen in the background of the painting of Joseph Gibbs by Thomas Gainsborough. Apart from missing accidentals, the music on the stand is identical in layout and page number to the first sonata from Festing's Op 7, published in 1744 where Gibbs is listed as a subscriber.
