= Prelude No. 4 (Villa-Lobos) =

Guitar piece by Heitor Villa-Lobos

Prelude No. 4 is a guitar piece written by Brazilian composer Heitor Villa-Lobos.

The piece is subtitled "Homenagem ao índio brasileiro" (Homage to the Brazilian Indian), is in the key of E minor, marked "Lento", and is the fourth of the Five Preludes, written in 1940. The others are in E minor, E major, A minor, and D major. It was first performed, together with its four companions, by Abel Carlevaro in Montevideo on 11 December 1942.
