= The Wall (1967 film) =

1967 film

- French theatrical poster
- Directed by: Serge Roullet
- Written by: Serge Roullet; Jean-Paul Sartre
- Produced by: Claude Jaeger
- Starring: Michel del Castillo
- Cinematography: Denys Clerval
- Edited by: Denise Baby
- Release date: 23 October 1967
- Running time: 91 minutes
- Country: France
- Language: French

The Wall (French: Le Mur) is a 1967 French drama film directed by Serge Roullet and based on the short story of the same name by Jean-Paul Sartre, who also wrote the dialogue for the film. It was entered into the 17th Berlin International Film Festival.

== Plot ==
During the Spanish Civil War, three men are arrested and imprisoned by General Franco's troops. Pablo is a worker and an associate of the anarchist leader Ramón, who is in hiding; Tom is an English member of the International Brigades; and Juan, still a teenager, is the innocent brother of a militant. Sentenced to death, they spend their last night together in a cell. A Belgian doctor is sent to watch over them, but they reject all companionship with him.

At dawn the boy and the Englishman are taken out and shot, while Pablo is sent for further interrogation. Given 15 minutes to say where Ramón is or be shot, he decides to buy himself time by giving an absurd answer. He says Ramón is hiding in the cemetery, and a squad of soldiers rushes off to comb the place. Shortly after, some newly arrested men come in, one of whom knows Pablo. He tells Pablo the sad news: that Ramón broke cover and has just been arrested after taking refuge in a gravediggers' hut.

== Reception ==
Film critic Jean de Baroncelli writes that the film follows in the style of director Robert Bresson and that the film is "noble, austere, powerful and moving".

== Cast ==
- Michel del Castillo as Pablo
- Denis Mahaffey as Tom
- Matthieu Klossowski as Juan
- Anna Pacheco as Concha
- René Darmon as Ramón
- Bernard Anglade as The Doctor
- Jorge Lavelli as Officer
