= Wolfgang Baumgratz =

German organist and academic teacher

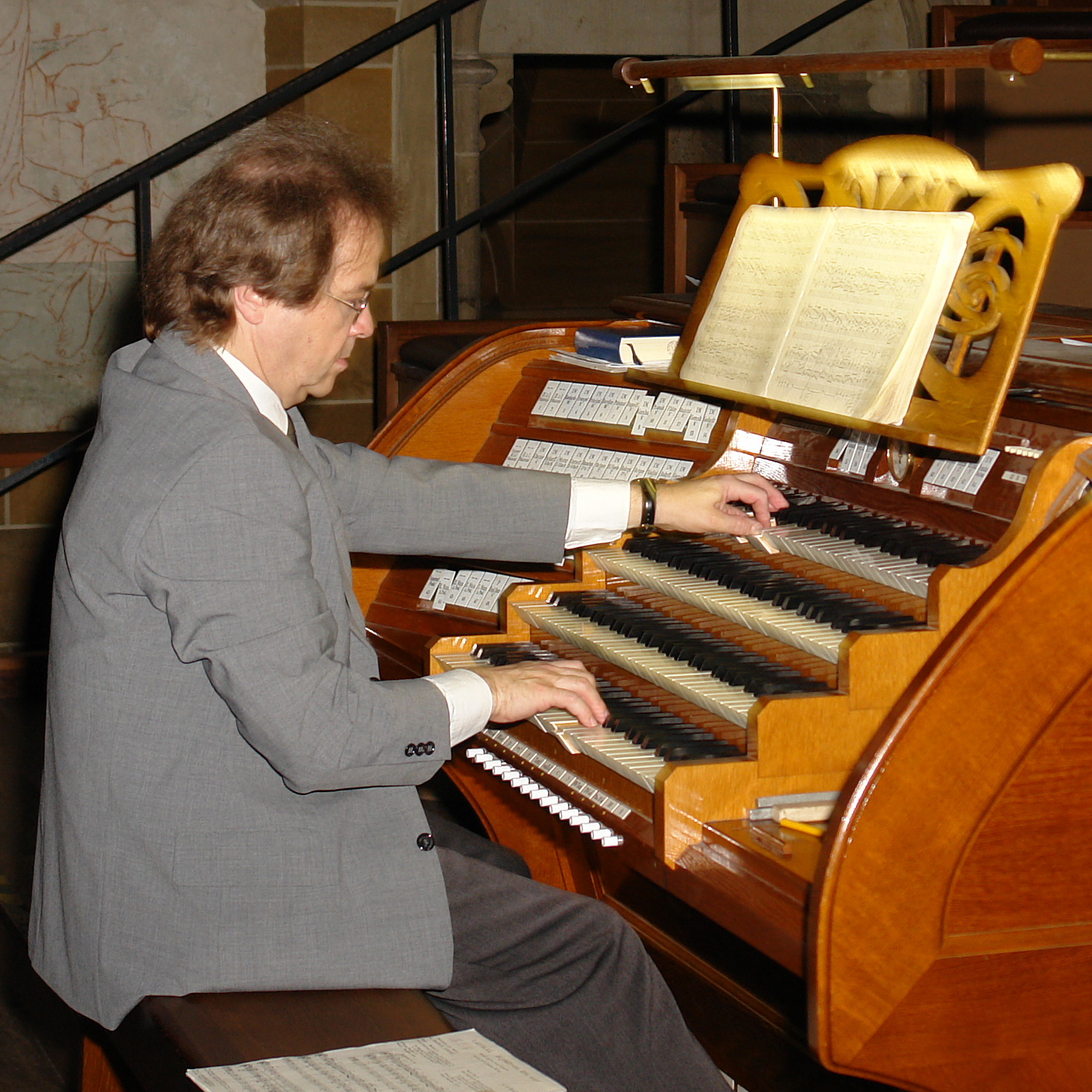
- Wolfgang Baumgratz at the Sauer organ at Bremen Cathedral in 2007
- Born: 10 October 1948 (age 77); Meersburg, Germany
- Education: Hochschule für Kirchenmusik Heidelberg; Hochschule für Musik Freiburg; Conservatorium van Amsterdam
- Occupations: Organist; Academic teacher
- Organizations: Bremen Cathedral; HfK Bremen

Wolfgang Baumgratz (born 10 October 1948 in Meersburg) is a German organist and academic teacher.

== Life ==
Wolfgang Baumgratz studied organ and sacred music at the Hochschule für Kirchenmusik in Heidelberg and at the Hochschule für Musik in Freiburg im Breisgau (organ class of Ludwig Doerr). He graduated with a Master's degree in sacred music (1976) and was music director at the Johanneskirche in Merzhausen from 1971 until 1976. Between 1976 and 1978, he studied organ with Albert de Klerk at the Conservatorium in Amsterdam, Netherlands, as recipient of a scholarship from the Deutscher Akademischer Austauschdienst (DAAD), and graduated with a soloist diploma in organ performance in 1978.

In 1979, Baumgratz became organist at Bremen Cathedral, where he succeeded Zsigmond Szathmáry. The following year, he became lecturer of organ at the Hochschule für Künste (HfK) Bremen, and in 1984 was appointed professor of organ performance. In 1989, he became department chair of the HfK sacred music department.

Since 1982, he has been working as organ consultant for the Evangelical Church of Bremen (Bremische Evangelische Kirche). In 1990, he was elected vice president of the Gesellschaft der Orgelfreunde (GdO); he was president of the GdO from 1998 until 2013. After his retirement in 2014, he became organist at the Lutheran St. Remberti church in Bremen. Since 2020, he is organist at Immanuel church and the Alte Waller Kirche in Bremen.

Wolfgang Baumgratz has performed throughout Europe and released numerous LP and CD recordings.

== Recordings ==
- Music for Harpsichord and Organ at Bremen Cathedral.
  - Works by George Frideric Handel, Nicholas Carlston, Carl Philipp Emanuel Bach, François Couperin, and Bernardo Pasquini. Käte van Tricht, harpsichord and Wolfgang Baumgratz, organ. Gottfried Silbermann organ, Bremen Cathedral. Detmold: Musikproduktion Dabringhaus & Grimm, 1981. 1 LP.
- Georg Philipp Telemann: Organ Works.
  - Bach organ (Van Vulpen), Bremen Cathedral. Detmold: Musikproduktion Dabringhaus & Grimm, 1982. 1 LP.
- Organ Recital at Bremen Cathedral – Music based on the "Te Deum laudamus".
  - Works by Pierre Attaignant, Dieterich Buxtehude, Nicolas Gigault, Max Reger, and Charles Tournemire. Wilhelm Sauer organ, Bremen Cathedral. Freiburg im Breisgau: Christophorus, 1983. 1 LP.
- Johann Sebastian Bach: The Six Trio Sonatas.
  - Bach organ (Van Vulpen), Bremen Cathedral. Düsseldorf: Motette, 1985. 2 LP's.
- Johann Sebastian Bach: Organ Transcriptions of the Romantic Period.
  - Organ Transcriptions by Franz Liszt, Jan Barend Litzau, William Thomas Best, Alexandre Guilmant, Charles-Marie Widor, Sigfrid Karg-Elert, and Max Reger. Sauer organ, Bremen Cathedral. Detmold: Musikproduktion Dabringhaus & Grimm, 1985. 1 LP.
- Johann Caspar Ferdinand Fischer: Ariadne Musica.
  - Arp Schnitger organ, Grasberg. Freiburg im Breisgau: Christophorus, 1985. 1 LP.
- Nocturne: Cor anglais & Organ.
  - Works by Johann Sebastian Bach, César Franck, Gabriel Fauré, Josef Rheinberger, Max Reger, Hendrik Andriessen, and Marguerite Roesgen-Champion. Helmut Schaarschmidt, cor anglais and Wolfgang Baumgratz, organ. Klais organ, Stadtkirche Rotenburg/Wümme. Heidelberg: Christophorus, 1986/2005. 1 CD.
- Wilhelm Friedemann Bach: Complete Organ Works.
  - Holzhey organ, Neresheim Abbey. Freiburg im Breisgau: Christophorus, 1991. 1 CD.
- Bach and Handel: Works in Romantic Organ Transcriptions.
  - Organ Transcriptions by Sigfrid Karg-Elert, Max Reger, Alexandre Guilmant, Arno Landmann, and William Thomas Best. Sauer organ, Bremen Cathedral. Detmold: Musikproduktion Dabringhaus & Grimm, 1997. 1 CD.
- Klerk-Musik: Organ Works by Albert de Klerk.
  - Sauer organ, Bremen Cathedral. Rotterdam: Lindenberg Boeken & Muziek, 1997. 1 CD.
- Josef Rheinberger: Organ Music, Vol. 7.
  - Sauer organ, Bremen Cathedral. Düsseldorf: Motette, 1999. 1 CD.
- Organ Landscape Schleswig/Sonderjylland.
  - Works by Dieterich Buxtehude, Franz Tunder, Johann Nicolaus Hanff, Nicolaus Bruhns, Johann Christian Schieferdecker, Petrus Heydorn, Niels Wilhelm Gade, Johann Lorentz, and Johann Peter Emilius Hartmann. Detmold: Musikproduktion Dabringhaus & Grimm, 1999. 1 CD.
- Organ Landscape Holstein/Lübeck.
  - Works by Andreas Kneller, Dieterich Buxtehude, Petrus Heydorn, Christian Flor, Jacob Kortkamp, Nicolaus Hasse, Johann Steffens, and Petrus Hasse. Detmold: Musikproduktion Dabringhaus & Grimm, 2000. 1 CD.
- Organ Landscape Holstein/Lübeck, Vol. 2.
  - 19th century organs. Detmold: Musikproduktion Dabringhaus & Grimm, 2000. 1 CD.
- Organ Music by Women Composers.
  - Works by Clara Schumann, Elfrida Andrée, Cécile Chaminade, and Elsa Barraine. Sauer organ, Bremen Cathedral. Saarbrücken: IFO Classics, 2000. 1 CD.
- Gottfried Silbermann Organs, Vol. 6.
  - Silbermann organs in Freiberg, Mylau, Bremen and Schloss Burgk. Altenburg: Querstand, 2001. 1 CD.
- Exquisite Music for Sopranino Recorder & Oboe with Organ.
  - Works by Johann Sebastian Bach, Georg Friedrich Händel, Alexandre Guilmant, Gabriel Fauré, Carl Nielsen, Francesco Maria Veracini, and Wolfgang Amadeus Mozart. Helmut Schaarschmidt, sopranino recorder & oboe and Wolfgang Baumgratz, organ. Sauer organ, Bremen Cathedral. Heidelberg: Christophorus, 2002. 1 CD.
- "Ein feste Burg ist unser Gott": The Sauer Organ at Bremen Cathedral.
  - Works by Max Reger. Sauer organ, Bremen Cathedral. Everswinkel: Tonstudio Solle, 2004. 1 CD.
- Organ Works by the Bach Family.
  - Works by Johann Christoph Bach, Johann Michael Bach, Johann Bernhard Bach, Wilhelm Friedemann Bach, Carl Philipp Emanuel Bach, and Johann Christian Bach. Algermissen: Ambiente, 2004. 1 CD.
- Johann Sebastian Bach: Inventions and Sinfonias.
  - Silbermann organ, Bremen Cathedral. Düsseldorf: Motette, 2005. 1 CD.
- Jan Janca: Organ Works, Vol. 3.
  - Das Kirchenjahr in 16 Choralvorspielen (2006). Rondo for Organ (2002). Sauer organ, Bremen Cathedral. Detmold: Musikproduktion Dabringhaus & Grimm, 2009. 1 CD.
- Gottlieb Muffat: 72 Versetl sammt 12 Toccaten (1726)
  - Various organs: Basilika St. Mang, Heilig-Heist-Spitalkirche, Friedhofskirche St. Sebastian, Kirche Unsere Liebe Frau am Berg. Munich: Ambiente 3641001 2004. 1 CD.
- Gottlieb Muffat: Missa F-Dur für Orgel + Toccatas + Proper Hymns from the Common Feasts of the Blessed Virgin Mary.
  - Organ of St. Mang Füssen; Schola of St. Mang in Füssen. Munich: Ambiente 4357933 2002 1 CD.
