= Prelude No. 2 (Villa-Lobos) =

Guitar piece by Heitor Villa-Lobos

Prelude No. 2 is a guitar piece written by Brazilian composer Heitor Villa-Lobos.

The piece is subtitled "Melodia capadócia" (Capadocian Melody), is in the key of E major, marked "Andantino", and is the second of the Five Preludes, written in 1940. The others are in E minor, A minor, E minor, and D major. It was first performed, together with its four companions, by Abel Carlevaro in Montevideo on 11 December 1942.

The subtitle refers to the capadócio, also called malandro carioca: a rascally character of the Rio de Janeiro Carnival.

This prelude relies on the musical genre of the choro, similar to the composer's Chôros No. 1, also for solo guitar. This is especially evident in the systematic rubato and harmonic structure of the first section, and in the rhythms and melody in parallel fifths for the central section, which recalls the berimbau (musical bow) and the stylized capadócio dance-game called capoeira.
