= Gottlieb Muffat =

Austrian composer and organist (1690-1770)

- Born: 25 April 1690
- Died: 9 December 1770 (aged 80)
- Genres: Classical, Baroque
- Occupations: Composer, organist
- Instrument: Organ
- Years active: 1711–1763

Gottlieb Muffat (25 April 1690 – 9 December 1770), son of Georg Muffat, served as Hofscholar under Johann Fux in Vienna from 1711 and was appointed to the position of third court organist at the Hofkapelle in 1717. He acquired additional duties over time including the instruction of members of the Imperial family, among them the future Empress Maria Theresa. He was promoted to second organist in 1729 and first organist upon the accession of Maria Theresa to the throne in 1741. He retired from official duties at the court in 1763.

== Compositions ==
Muffat's compositional output is primarily limited to keyboard music. He shows considerable skill as a contrapuntist in the short liturgical fugues published in his first collection 72 Versetl sammt 12 Toccaten (Vienna, 1726). These pieces reflect a conservative approach to liturgical music in that they are organized in the order of the church tones with an introductory toccata and a regular number of versets for each tone.

His second publication, Componimenti musicali per il cembalo (Augsburg, ca. 1736), is more progressive in its outlook. This collection of six suites, while maintaining the traditional Allemande, Courante and Saraband format, is more lavishly ornamented than was characteristic of Austro-German music of that era. Some of the movements are even given fanciful French titles like La Coquette or L'aimable Esprit as were popular among the clavecinistes. Short, simple phrases and clear motives characterize the pieces in this set. The preface to this work contains an ornamentation table with symbols and performance instructions for 57 ornaments.

Much of Muffat's output remains unpublished, though it nonetheless contains much music of great interest. His manuscript containing 32 ricercare and 19 canzonas is remarkable in that it is the largest body of work from his era based on 17th century models. Like all pupils of Fux, Muffat would have studied the music of Frescobaldi and Froberger during his years of apprenticeship. In the ricercare, Muffat shows himself to be a master of the stile antico. Following the usage of the early Baroque, the contrapuntal ricercare are notated in open score and preserve the sense of modality and sectional structure of the Italian masters. The canzonas are modeled on the 16th century vocal motet and are livelier and more idiomatically instrumental in style.

Also still in manuscript are the 24 Toccatas and Capriccios. a pairing which seems to be unique to Muffat. Two styles of toccatas appear in this collection: one type features a florid melodic line over a supporting chordal structure and the second type utilizes a sectional form that juxtaposes contrasting tempi, meters and textures. The capriccios represent a variety of styles including prelude, invention, and dance forms.

== Muffat and Handel ==
It is well established that Handel borrowed copiously from his contemporaries, including Muffat. While it would be easy to cast aspersions at Handel for this seemingly dishonest practice, it hardly diminishes his stature as a composer and probably would not have created much consternation for either party.

It is not known with certainty whether Handel and Muffat had any personal knowledge of each other, but their positions as leading musicians in major European capitals might imply at least a mutual awareness. There is a copy, in Muffat's own hand, of Handel's Suites des pieces (1720) which Muffat supplied with numerous ornaments along with a few variants of his own design. Modern edition by Hogwood 2007. Muffat as well did his own version of Handel's 6 Fugues for Keyboard (1735) HWV 605–610, first edition from the manuscript by Hogwood 2008. For his part, Handel seems to have borrowed extensively from Muffat's Componimenti Musicali with at least 18 of these pieces appearing 30 times in Handel's output. Handel's Ode to St. Cecilia's Day seems to owe the greatest debt to Muffat, with material from five pieces being reworked into the score. Not only were themes reused in their entirety, but also counter subjects and continuing phrases were put to use by Handel. More such examples appear in Handel's oratorios Joshua, Samson, and Judas Maccabeus. The spirited fugue in the second movement of the Overture to Samson makes extensive use of a Muffat fugue from Componimenti Musicali and a similar borrowing occurs in the third movement of the Overture to Judas Maccabeus. The March which begins Act II of Joshua is a reworking of a Rigaudon by Muffat.

== Recordings ==
=== Harpsichord ===
- 2001: Gottlieb Muffat: Harpsichord Music Joseph Payne. CD Centaur: 2502.
- 2009: Gottlieb Muffat: Componimenti Musicali per il Cembalo Mitzi Meyerson. CD Glossa: GCD921804.
- 2013: Gottlieb Muffat: Suites for Harpsichord (vol 1) Akutagawa Naoko. CD Naxos: 8.572610
- 2019: Gottlieb Muffat: Suites for Harpsichord (vol 2) Akutagawa Naoko CD Naxos: 8.573275
- 2021: Gottlieb Muffat: Suites for Harpsichord (vol. 3) Akutagawa Naoko CD Naxos: 8.574098
- 2024: Muffat: Componimenti Musicali per il cembalo (1736) Roberto Loreggian CD Brilliant Classics: 96340.

=== Organ ===
- 2002: Gottlieb Muffat: Missa F-Dur for Organ + Toccatas. Wolfgang Baumgratz CD Ambiente 4357933
- 2004: Gottlieb Muffat: 72 Versetl sammt 12 Toccaten (1726) Wolfgang Baumgratz CD Ambiente: 3641001
- 2009: Orgelmusik am Wiener Hof: Georg und Gottlieb Muffat Wolfgang Kogert CD NCA: 60206
- 2010: Gottlieb Muffat toccatas, capriccios, canzonas, and ricercars Jörg Andreas Bötticher CD Pan Classics: PC10224
- 2025: Gottlieb Muffat: Organ-Music from the Archive of the Minorites in Vienna: ricercate, canzoni, toccate, capricci Pier Damiano Peretti CD Ambiente: ACD2023

== Works ==
Alison J. Dunlop's The Life and Works of Gottlieb Muffat (1690–1770) (2013) contains a thematic catalogue of Muffat's works and their sources. The catalogue is divided into works printed during Muffat's lifetime (A), keyboard partitas (B), anonymous partitas of uncertain authorship (App B), other keyboard works (C), and chamber works (D).

The catalogue identifiers below are given as MC numbers for convenience; they follow the numbering in the supplied transcription of Dunlop's catalogue. Source shelfmarks and RISM links are reproduced from the supplied research data.

=== A — Works printed during Muffat's lifetime ===
The A section includes the twelve toccatas with fugues, MC A1-A12, from 72 Versetl sammt 12 Toccaten (Vienna, 1726), followed by works from Componimenti Musicali per il Cembalo, MC A13-A19 (Augsburg, ca. 1736–39).

MC	Work	Key	Instrument	Movements	Sources	Notes
MC A1	Toccata and Fugues	D minor	Organ	Toccata; Fugue I Fugue II; Fugue III; Fugue IV; Fugue V Fugue VI	D-B, Mus.ms. 15781; D-Hs, ND VI 3209 (Nr. 3); RISM	—
MC A2	Toccata and Fugues	G minor	Organ	Toccata; Fugue I Fugue II; Fugue III; Fugue IV; Fugue V Fugue VI	D-B, Mus.ms. 15781; D-Hs, ND VI 3209 (Nr. 4); RISM	—
MC A3	Toccata and Fugues	A minor	Organ	Toccata; Fugue I Fugue II; Fugue III; Fugue IV; Fugue V Fugue VI	D-B, Mus.ms. 15781; D-Hs, ND VI 3209 (Nr. 5); RISM	—
MC A4	Toccata and Fugues	E minor	Organ	Toccata; Fugue I Fugue II; Fugue III; Fugue IV; Fugue V Fugue VI	CZ-Pu, 59 R 1451; D-B, Mus.ms. 15781; D-Hs, ND VI 3209 (Nr. 6); SK-Nb, 53; RISM	—
MC A5	Toccata and Fugues	C major	Organ	Toccata; Fugue I Fugue II; Fugue III; Fugue IV; Fugue V Fugue VI	D-B, Mus.ms. 15781; D-Hs, ND VI 3209 (Nr. 7); RISM	—
MC A6	Toccata and Fugues	F major	Organ	Toccata; Fugue I Fugue II; Fugue III; Fugue IV; Fugue V Fugue VI	D-B, Mus.ms. 15781; D-Hs, ND VI 3209 (Nr. 8); RISM	—
MC A7	Toccata and Fugues	D major	Organ	Toccata; Fugue I Fugue II; Fugue III; Fugue IV; Fugue V Fugue VI	D-B, Mus.ms. 15781; D-Hs, ND VI 3209 (Nr. 9); RISM	—
MC A8	Toccata and Fugues	G major	Organ	Toccata; Fugue I Fugue II; Fugue III; Fugue IV; Fugue V Fugue VI	D-B, Mus.ms. 15781; D-Hs, ND VI 3209 (Nr. 10); RISM	—
MC A9	Toccata and Fugues	C minor	Organ	Toccata; Fugue I Fugue II; Fugue III; Fugue IV; Fugue V Fugue VI	D-B, Mus.ms. 15781; D-Hs, ND VI 3209 (Nr. 11); RISM	—
MC A10	Toccata and Fugues	A major	Organ	Toccata; Fugue I Fugue II; Fugue III; Fugue IV; Fugue V Fugue VI	D-B, Mus.ms. 15781; D-Hs, ND VI 3209 (Nr. 12); RISM	—
MC A11	Toccata and Fugues	E minor	Organ	Toccata; Fugue I Fugue II; Fugue III; Fugue IV; Fugue V Fugue VI	CZ-Pu, 59 R 1451; D-B, Mus.ms. 15781; D-Hs, ND VI 3209 (Nr. 13); RISM	—
MC A12	Toccata and Fugues	B♭ major	Organ	Toccata; Fugue I Fugue II; Fugue III; Fugue IV; Fugue V Fugue VI	D-B, Mus.ms. 15781; D-Hs, ND VI 3209 (Nr. 14); RISM	—
MC A13	Suite	C major	Harpsichord	Ouverture; Allemande; Courante; Air; Rigaudon; Menuet; Trio; Adagio; Finale	— RISM	Componimenti musicali
MC A14	Suite	G minor	Harpsichord	Prelude; Allemande; Courante; Sarabande; Bourrée; Menuet; Trio; Fantasie; Gigue	— RISM	Componimenti musicali
MC A15	Suite	D major	Harpsichord	Fantasie; Allemande; Courante; Sarabande; Menuet; Rigaudon; Air; Finale	— RISM	Componimenti musicali
MC A16	Suite	B♭ major	Harpsichord	Fantasie; Allemande; Courante; Sarabande; La Hardiesse; Menuet I Menuet II; Air; Hornpipe; Gigue	— RISM	Componimenti musicali
MC A17	Suite	D minor	Harpsichord	Ouverture; Allemande; Courante; Sarabande; Menuet I Rigaudon; Menuet II; Trio; Gigue	— RISM	Componimenti musicali
MC A18	Suite	G major	Harpsichord	Fantasie; Adagio; Fuga; Allemande; Courante; Sarabande; La Coquette; Menuet I Trio; Air; Gigue; Menuet II	— RISM	Componimenti musicali
MC A19	Ciaccona	G major	Harpsichord	Ciaccona	— RISM	Componimenti musicali

=== B — Keyboard partitas ===
Dunlop's B section contains keyboard partitas B1–B43. B1-B6 are a set of six partitas; B7-B15 are a set of nine partitas; B17-B19 are three partitas entitled "Parisien"; B16 and B20-B43 are miscellaneous partitas.

MC	Work	Key	Instrument	Movements	Sources	Notes
MC B1	Partita	D major	Harpsichord	Prelude; Ballet; Fourlana; Gavotte; Menuet; Sarabande; Rigaudon; Gigue	D-B SA 4573; RISM	—
MC B2	Partita	D minor	Harpsichord	Prelude; Allemande; Courante; Siciliana; Bourrée; Menuet; Finale	D-B SA 4574; RISM	—
MC B3	Partita	B♭ major	Harpsichord	Fantasia; Other movements	D-B SA 4575; RISM	—
MC B4	Partita	F major	Harpsichord	Prelude; Intrada; Menuet I Sarabande; Rigaudon; Menuet II & Trio	A-Wn Mus.hs.18685; D-B SA 4576; RISM	—
MC B5	Partita	G major	Harpsichord	Prelude; Aria I Aria II; Ballet; Passpied; Paysan; Gigue; Menuet	D-B SA 4577; RISM	—
MC B6	Partita	G minor	Harpsichord	Prelude; Le Bastard; Aria; Bourrée; Menuet & Trio; La Jalouise; Gigue; Harlequinade	A-Wn Mus.hs.18691; D-B SA 4578; RISM	—
MC B7	Partita	D major	Harpsichord	Fantasie; Allemande; Courante; Sarabande; Rigaudon; Menuet & Trio; Gigue; Finale	D-B SA 4585; RISM	—
MC B8	Partita	B♭ major	Harpsichord	Ouverture; Fuga; Allemande; Air; Menuet I & Trio; Rondeau; Menuet II; Hornpipe; Gigue	D-B SA 4586; RISM	—
MC B9	Partita	F major	Harpsichord	Prelude; Menuet I Fantasie; Sarabande; Bourrée; Postillon; Menuet II & Trio; Finale	D-B SA 4587; RISM	—
MC B10	Partita	B♭ major	Harpsichord	Fantasie; La Bravoure; Menuet I & Trio; Harlequine; Air; Paysan; Menuet II; Finale	D-B SA 4588; RISM	—
MC B11	Partita	G minor	Harpsichord	Prelude; Allemande; Courante; Sarabande; Menuet I Harlequin; Menuet II & Trio; Gigue; Finale	D-B Mus.ms.15784/1; D-B SA 4589; RISM	—
MC B12	Partita	D minor	Harpsichord	Prelude; Menuet I Fantasie; Air; Bourrée; Ballet; Gigue; Gavotte; Menuet II & Trio; Finale	D-B SA 4590; RISM	—
MC B13	Partita	A minor	Harpsichord	Prelude; Menuet I La Reputation; Air; Ballet; Menuet II & Trio; Adagio; Bourrée; Gigue; Menuet III	D-B SA 4591; RISM	—
MC B14	Partita	G major	Harpsichord	Prelude; La Conversation; Sarabande; La Badinage; Aria; Menuet & Trio; Adagio; Grotesque en Rondeau	D-B SA 4592; RISM	—
MC B15	Partita	C major	Harpsichord	Prelude; Menuet; L'Allegresse; Contrefaiseur; Rondeau; Sarabande; Passpied I Passpied II; Gigue; Marche; Finale	D-B SA 4593; RISM	—
MC B16	Partita	A major	Harpsichord	Prelude; Allemande; Courante; Sarabande; Menuet; Coquette; Gigue	D-B SA 4594; RISM	—
MC B17	Partita	B♭ major	Harpsichord	Ouverture; Courante; Allemande; Siciliana; Rondeau; Aria; Paysan; Menuet & Trio; Gigue	D-B SA 4579; RISM	—
MC B18	Partita	D major	Harpsichord	Prelude; Harlequinade; Hornpipe; Sarabande; Menuet; Gavotte; Finale	D-B SA 4579; RISM	—
MC B19	Partita	A minor	Harpsichord	Prelude; Allemande; Courante; Sarabande; Ballet; Aria en Rondeau; Bourrée; Menuet; Finale	D-B SA 4579; RISM	—
MC B20	Partita	—	Keyboard	—	A-Wn Mus.hs.15935	—
MC B21	Partita	C major	Harpsichord	Prelude; Allemande; Courante; Sarabande; Menuet I & Trio; Bourrée; Menuet II; Paysan; Gigue	D-B SA 4580; RISM	—
MC B22	Partita	C major	Harpsichord	(Without Title); L'aimable; Sarabande; Bourrée; Menuet & Trio; Paysan; Finale	D-B Mus.ms.15784/2; RISM	—
MC B23	Partita	C major	Harpsichord	Prelude; Vivace; L'obéissance; Passpied; Gigue; Menuet; Trio; Finale en Rondeau	D-BEU Mus.ms.30; RISM	—
MC B24	Partita	B♭ major	Harpsichord	Prelude; Allemande; Courante; Sarabande; Bourrée; Menuet I Gavotte I Gavotte II; Gigue; Menuet II	D-Mbs Mus.mss.5475; RISM	—
MC B25	Partita	—	Keyboard	—	A-Wn Mus.hs.18685	—
MC B26	Partita	D minor	Harpsichord	Capriccio; Adagio; Menuet I (Without Title); Sarabande; Rondeau; Hornpipe; Rigaudon; Menuet II; Gigue	D-Mbs Mus.mss.5472; RISM	—
MC B27	Partita	D minor	Harpsichord	Prelude; Allemande; Courante; Sarabande; Paysan; Menuet & Trio; Aria; Ballet; Gigue	D-B SA 4580; RISM	—
MC B28	Partita	—	Keyboard	—	A-Wn Mus.hs.18780	—
MC B29	Partita	—	Keyboard	—	A-Wn Mus.hs.18780	—
MC B30	Partita	—	Keyboard	—	A-Gd Pfarre St. Lambrecht, Ms.24; A-Wm XIV 715; A-Wm XIV 729; A-Wn Mus.hs.18691; A-Wn Mus.hs.18780	—
MC B31	Partita	G major	Harpsichord	Capriccio; La Vivacité; Siciliana; Bourrée; Menuet I Paysan; Hornpipe; Harlequin; Menuet II & Trio; Finale	D-B SA 4580; RISM	—
MC B32	Partita	G major	Harpsichord	Prelude; Courage; Passpied; Air; Menuet; Bourrée; Gigue; Gavotte en Rondeau	D-Mbs Mus.mss.5476; H-Bn Ms.mus.749; H-Bn Ms.mus.753; RISM	—
MC B33	Partita	—	Keyboard	—	A-Wm XIV 715; A-Wn Mus.hs.18685	—
MC B34	Partita	—	Keyboard	—	A-Wm XIV 730	—
MC B35	Partita	—	Keyboard	—	A-Wm XIV 715; A-Wm XIV 737; H-Bn Ms.mus.749	—
MC B36	Partita	A major	Harpsichord	Prelude; Allemande; Courante; Sarabande; Gavotte; Air en Menuet; Gigue Angloise; Menuet Angloise	A-Wm XIV 715; A-Wn Mus.hs.18685; D-B Mus.ms.15780; D-B SA 4531; D-B SA 4582; RISM	—
MC B37	Partita	A minor	Harpsichord	Prelude; Allemande; Courante; Gavotte; Sarabande; Paysan; Passpied; Gigue	D-B SA 4580; RISM	—
MC B38	Partita	—	Keyboard	—	A-Wm XIV 715; A-Wm XIV 716; A-Wn Mus.hs.18780	—
MC B39	Partita	A minor	Harpsichord	Prelude; Siciliana; Menuet; La gaieté Sarabande; Menuet & Trio; Paysan; Finale	D-BEU Mus.ms.30; RISM	—
MC B40	Partita	B♭ major	Harpsichord	Allemande; Courante; Siciliana; Paysan; Menuet; Gigue	D-Mbs Mus.mss.5474; RISM	—
MC B41	Partita	B♭ major	Harpsichord	(Without Title); Other movements	A-Wm XIV 715; A-Wn Mus.hs.18685; A-Wn Mus.hs.18780; A-Wn Mus.hs.19172; D-B Mus.ms.15780; RISM	—
MC B42	Partita	—	Keyboard	—	A-Wm XIV 715; A-Wn Mus.hs.18780	—
MC B43	Partita	D minor	Harpsichord	Fantasie (Allemande?); Hornpipe; Gavotte en Rondeau (Sarabande?); Menuet I Air; Menuet II & Trio; Gigue	D-B SA 4595; RISM	Allemande and Sarabande not listed in RISM, but featured in a recording of the suite

=== App B — Anonymous keyboard partitas of uncertain authorship ===
This appendix contains anonymous keyboard partitas of uncertain authorship (App B1–App B9) and a Chaconne (App B10).

MC	Work	Key	Instrument	Movements	Sources	Notes
MC App B1	Partita	C major	Harpsichord	(Without Title); Other movements	A-Wm XIV 715; A-Wn Mus.hs.18780; D-B Mus.ms.15780; RISM	Uncertain authorship
MC App B2	Partita	—	Keyboard	—	A-Wn Mus.hs.18685; A-Wn Mus.hs.18780	Uncertain authorship
MC App B3	Partita	—	Keyboard	—	A-Wn Mus.hs.18780	Uncertain authorship
MC App B4	Partita	—	Keyboard	—	A-Wn Mus.hs.18780	Uncertain authorship
MC App B5	Partita	—	Keyboard	—	A-Wn Mus.hs.18780	Uncertain authorship
MC App B6	Partita	—	Keyboard	—	A-Wn Mus.hs.18780	Uncertain authorship
MC App B7	Partita	—	Keyboard	—	A-Wm XIV 715; A-Wn Mus.hs.18780	Uncertain authorship
MC App B8	Partita	—	Keyboard	—	A-Wn Mus.hs.18780	Uncertain authorship
MC App B9	Partita	—	Keyboard	—	A-Wn Mus.hs.18780	Uncertain authorship
MC App B10	Chaconne	—	Keyboard	Chaconne	A-Wn Mus.hs.18691	Uncertain authorship

=== C — Other keyboard works ===
This section contains organ music, individual fugues, ricercars, canzonas, toccatas, capriccios, and other preludial or improvisatory-style pieces. C1-C2 are organ pastorellas; C3-C4 are organ masses; C5-C16 are organ preludes with a liturgical function; C17-C21 are fugues; C22-C72 are 32 ricercars and 19 canzonas; C73-C96 are 24 toccatas and capriccios; C97-C115 are preludes and improvisatory-style pieces.

MC	Work	Key	Instrument	Movements	Sources	Notes
MC C1	Pastorale	C major	Organ	Pastorella; Allegro; Adagio; Aria	D-B SA 4584; RISM	—
MC C2	Pastorale	D major	Organ	Pastorella; Allegro; Allegro Assai; Aria	D-B SA 4583; RISM	—
MC C3	Mass	C major	Organ	15 movements	D-BEU Mus.ms.82; D-Hs, ND VI 3273; RISM	Incomplete
MC C4	Mass	F major	Organ	31 movements	D-BEU Mus.ms.82; D-Hs, ND VI 3273; RISM	—
MC C5	Prelude	C major	Organ	—	A-GÖ Ms. 4733; D-B Mus.ms.15781; RISM	—
MC C6	Prelude	D minor	Organ	—	A-GÖ Ms. 4733; D-B Mus.ms.15781; RISM	—
MC C7	Prelude	D minor	Organ	—	A-GÖ Ms. 4733; D-B Mus.ms.15781; RISM	—
MC C8	Prelude	E minor	Organ	—	A-GÖ Ms. 4733; D-B Mus.ms.15781; RISM	—
MC C9	Prelude	E minor	Organ	—	A-GÖ Ms. 4733; A-Wgm VII 16254 (Q 11385); D-B Mus.ms.15781; RISM	—
MC C10	Prelude	F major	Organ	—	A-GÖ Ms. 4733; A-Wgm VII 16254 (Q 11385); D-B Mus.ms.15781; RISM	—
MC C11	Prelude	G major	Organ	—	A-GÖ Ms. 4733; D-B Mus.ms.15781; RISM	—
MC C12	Prelude	G minor	Organ	—	A-GÖ Ms. 4733; D-B Mus.ms.15781; RISM	—
MC C13	Prelude	A minor	Organ	—	A-GÖ Ms. 4733; D-B Mus.ms.15781; RISM	—
MC C14	Prelude	A minor	Organ	—	A-GÖ Ms. 4733; D-B Mus.ms.15781; RISM	—
MC C15	Prelude	A minor	Organ	—	A-GÖ Ms. 4733; D-B Mus.ms.15781; RISM	—
MC C16	Prelude	A minor	Organ	—	A-GÖ Ms. 4733; D-B Mus.ms.15781; RISM	—
MC C17	Fugue	A minor	Organ	—	A-GÖ Ms. 4733; D-B Mus.ms.15781; RISM	—
MC C18	Fugue	F major	Organ	—	D-B Mus.ms.15783; H-Bn Ms.mus.753; RISM	—
MC C19	Fugue	F major	Organ	—	A-GÖ Ms. 4733; A-Wgm VII 16254 (Q 11385); D-B Mus.ms.15781; H-Bn Ms.mus.753; RISM	—
MC C20	Fugue	G major	Organ	—	A-GÖ Ms. 4733; D-B Mus.ms.15781; RISM	—
MC C21	Fugue	G minor	Organ	—	A-GÖ Ms. 4733; D-B Mus.ms.15781; D-B Mus.ms.15783; RISM	—
MC C22	—	—	Keyboard	—	A-Wm XIV 712; A-Wm XIV 729; US-NYp Drexel 3276	—
MC C23	—	—	Keyboard	—	A-Wm XIV 712; US-NYp Drexel 3276	—
MC C24	—	—	Keyboard	—	A-Wm XIV 712; US-NYp Drexel 3276	—
MC C25	—	—	Keyboard	—	A-Wm XIV 712	—
MC C26	—	—	Keyboard	—	A-Wm XIV 712	—
MC C27	—	—	Keyboard	—	A-Wm XIV 712; A-Wm XIV 729	—
MC C28	Ricercar	D major	Organ	—	A-GÖ Ms. 4733; A-Wm XIV 712; D-B Mus.ms.15781; US-NYp Drexel 3276; RISM	—
MC C29	—	—	Keyboard	—	A-Wm XIV 712	—
MC C30	—	—	Keyboard	—	A-Wm XIV 712	—
MC C31	—	—	Keyboard	—	A-Wm XIV 712	—
MC C32	—	—	Keyboard	—	A-Wm XIV 712	—
MC C33	—	—	Keyboard	—	A-Wm XIV 712	—
MC C34	—	—	Keyboard	—	A-Wm XIV 712	—
MC C35	—	—	Keyboard	—	A-Wm XIV 712	—
MC C36	—	—	Keyboard	—	A-Wm XIV 712	—
MC C37	—	—	Keyboard	—	A-Wm XIV 712	—
MC C38	—	—	Keyboard	—	A-Wm XIV 712	—
MC C39	—	—	Keyboard	—	A-Wm XIV 712	—
MC C40	—	—	Keyboard	—	A-Wm XIV 712	—
MC C41	—	—	Keyboard	—	A-Wm XIV 712	—
MC C42	—	—	Keyboard	—	A-Wm XIV 712	—
MC C43	—	—	Keyboard	—	A-Wm XIV 712	—
MC C44	—	—	Keyboard	—	A-Wm XIV 712	—
MC C45	—	—	Keyboard	—	A-Wm XIV 712	—
MC C46	—	—	Keyboard	—	A-Wm XIV 712	—
MC C47	—	—	Keyboard	—	A-Wm XIV 712	—
MC C48	—	—	Keyboard	—	A-Wm XIV 712	—
MC C49	—	—	Keyboard	—	A-Wm XIV 712	—
MC C50	Ricercar	G minor	Organ	—	A-GÖ Ms. 4733; A-Wm XIV 712; D-B Mus.ms.15781; RISM	—
MC C51	—	—	Keyboard	—	A-Wm XIV 712	—
MC C52	Ricercar	D minor	Organ	—	A-GÖ Ms. 4733; A-Wgm VII 16254 (Q 11385); A-Wm XIV 712; D-B Mus.ms.15781; D-B Mus.ms.30112; RISM	—
MC C53	—	—	Keyboard	—	A-Wm XIV 712	—
MC C54	—	—	Keyboard	—	A-Wm XIV 712	—
MC C55	Canzona	D minor	Organ	—	A-GÖ Ms. 4733; A-Wm XIV 712; D-B Mus.ms.15781; RISM	—
MC C56	Canzona	D major	Organ	—	A-GÖ Ms. 4733; A-Wm XIV 712; D-B Mus.ms.15781; RISM	—
MC C57	Canzona	C major	Organ	—	A-GÖ Ms. 4733; A-Wm XIV 712; D-B Mus.ms.15781; RISM	—
MC C58	—	—	Keyboard	—	A-Wm XIV 712; US-NYp Drexel 3276	—
MC C59	—	—	Keyboard	—	A-Wm XIV 712	—
MC C60	Ricercar	G minor	Keyboard	—	A-GÖ Ms. 4733; A-Wm XIV 712; D-B Mus.ms.15780; D-B Mus.ms.15781; D-B Mus.ms.30112; H-Bn Ms.mus.753; I-BAcp, U-II-4.10; RISM	FTCO F18.07S (misattributed to Frescobaldi)
MC C61	Ricercar	D minor	Keyboard	—	A-GÖ Ms. 4733; A-Wm XIV 712; D-B Mus.ms.15780; D-B Mus.ms.15781; RISM	FTCO F18.06S (misattributed to Frescobaldi)
MC C62	—	—	Keyboard	—	A-Wm XIV 712	—
MC C63	—	—	Keyboard	—	A-Wm XIV 712	—
MC C64	Ricercar	A minor	Keyboard	—	A-Wm XIV 712; D-B Mus.ms.15780; D-KBrlb, N 8 A.1.4.1; RISM	FTCO F18.08S (misattributed to Frescobaldi)
MC C65	—	—	Keyboard	—	A-Wm XIV 712; US-NYp Drexel 3276	—
MC C66	—	—	Keyboard	—	A-Wm XIV 712; US-NYp Drexel 3276	—
MC C67	—	—	Keyboard	—	A-Wm XIV 712	—
MC C68	—	—	Keyboard	—	A-Wm XIV 712	—
MC C69	—	—	Keyboard	—	A-Wm XIV 712	—
MC C70	—	—	Keyboard	—	A-Wm XIV 712	—
MC C71	—	—	Keyboard	—	A-Wm XIV 712	—
MC C72	Ricercar	G major	Organ	—	A-GÖ Ms. 4733; A-Wgm VII 16254 (Q 11385); A-Wm XIV 712; D-B Mus.ms.15781; RISM	—
MC C73	Toccata and Capriccio	D minor	Harpsichord	—	A-Wm XIV 715; D-B Mus.ms.15780; RISM	—
MC C74	Toccata and Capriccio	G minor	Harpsichord	—	A-Wm XIV 715; D-B Mus.ms.15780; RISM	—
MC C75	Toccata and Capriccio	A minor	Harpsichord	—	A-Wm XIV 715; D-B Mus.ms.15780; RISM	—
MC C76	Toccata and Capriccio	—	Harpsichord	—	A-Wm XIV 715	—
MC C77	Toccata and Capriccio	—	Harpsichord	—	A-Wm XIV 715	—
MC C78	Toccata and Capriccio	—	Harpsichord	—	A-Wm XIV 715; H-Bn Ms.mus.749	—
MC C79	Toccata and Capriccio	D major	Harpsichord	—	A-Wm XIV 715; D-B Mus.ms.15780; RISM	—
MC C80	Toccata and Capriccio	G major	Harpsichord	—	A-Wm XIV 715; D-B Mus.ms.15780; RISM	—
MC C81	Toccata and Capriccio	E minor	Harpsichord	—	A-Wm XIV 715; A-Wm XIV 716; RISM	—
MC C82	Toccata and Capriccio	C minor	Harpsichord	—	A-Wm XIV 715; D-B Mus.ms.15780; RISM	—
MC C83	Toccata and Capriccio	A major	Harpsichord	—	A-Wm XIV 715; D-B Mus.ms.15780; RISM	—
MC C84	Toccata and Capriccio	B♭ major	Harpsichord	—	A-Wm XIV 715; D-B Mus.ms.15780; RISM	—
MC C85	Toccata and Capriccio	D minor	Harpsichord	—	A-Wm XIV 715; D-B Mus.ms.15780; RISM	—
MC C86	Toccata and Capriccio	—	Harpsichord	—	A-Wm XIV 715	—
MC C87	Toccata and Capriccio	A minor	Harpsichord	—	A-Wm XIV 715; D-B Mus.ms.15780; RISM	—
MC C88	Toccata and Capriccio	E minor	Harpsichord	—	A-Wm XIV 715; D-B Mus.ms.15780; RISM	—
MC C89	Toccata and Capriccio	C major	Harpsichord	—	A-Wm XIV 715; D-B Mus.ms.15780; RISM	—
MC C90	Toccata and Capriccio	—	Harpsichord	—	A-Wm XIV 715; D-B Mus.ms.15780	—
MC C91	Toccata and Capriccio	D minor	Harpsichord	—	A-Wm XIV 715; D-B Mus.ms.15780; RISM	—
MC C92	Toccata and Capriccio	G major	Harpsichord	—	A-Wm XIV 715; D-B Mus.ms.15780; RISM	—
MC C93	Toccata and Capriccio	—	Harpsichord	—	A-Wm XIV 715	—
MC C94	Toccata and Capriccio	E minor	Harpsichord	—	A-Wm XIV 715; D-B Mus.ms.15780; RISM	—
MC C95	Toccata and Capriccio	C major	Harpsichord	—	A-Wm XIV 715; D-B Mus.ms.15780; H-Bn Ms.mus.753; RISM	—
MC C96	Toccata and Capriccio	B♭ major	Harpsichord	—	A-Wm XIV 715; D-B Mus.ms.15780; RISM	—
MC C97	—	—	Keyboard	—	A-Wm XIV 715	—
MC C98	Capriccio	D major	Harpsichord	—	A-Wm XIV 715; D-B Mus.ms.15780; RISM	—
MC C99	—	—	Keyboard	—	A-Wm XIV 715	—
MC C100	—	—	Keyboard	—	A-Wm XIV 715	—
MC C101	—	—	Keyboard	—	A-Wm XIV 715; H-Bn Ms.mus.753	—
MC C102	—	—	Keyboard	—	A-Wm XIV 715	—
MC C103	—	—	Keyboard	—	A-Wm XIV 715	—
MC C104	—	—	Keyboard	—	A-Wm XIV 715	—
MC C105	—	—	Keyboard	—	A-Wm XIV 715; H-Bn Ms.mus.753	—
MC C106	—	—	Keyboard	—	A-Wm XIV 715	—
MC C107	—	—	Keyboard	—	A-Wm XIV 715	—
MC C108	—	—	Keyboard	—	A-Wm XIV 715	—
MC C109	—	—	Keyboard	—	A-Wm XIV 715; A-Wm XIV 716	—
MC C110	—	—	Keyboard	—	A-Wm XIV 715	—
MC C111	—	—	Keyboard	—	A-Wm XIV 715	—
MC C112	—	—	Keyboard	—	A-Wm XIV 715; H-Bn Ms.mus.753	—
MC C113	Toccata	A minor	Harpsichord	—	A-Wm XIV 715; D-B Mus.ms.15780; RISM	—
MC C114	—	—	Keyboard	—	A-Wm XIV 715	—
MC C115	Prelude	A minor	Harpsichord	—	D-B Mus.ms.30266; RISM	—

=== D — Chamber works ===
This section contains the three keyboard concertos, the Sonata pastorale, and the Salve Regina.

MC	Work	Key	Instrument	Movements	Sources	Notes
MC D1	Concerto	C major	Harpsichord and strings	Spiritoso; Moderato; Finale	D-B SA 2870; RISM	—
MC D2	Concerto	F major	Harpsichord and strings	Vivace; Siciliana; Spiritoso	D-B SA 2869; RISM	—
MC D3	Concerto	B♭ major	Harpsichord, violin and basso continuo	(Without Title); Adagio; Spiritoso	D-B SA 2868; RISM	—
MC D4	Sonata	D major	—	—	A-Wn Mus.hs.16933	—
MC D5	Salve Regina	—	—	—	A-Gd Pfarre Bad Aussee, Ms.138	Authorship doubtful

== Notes ==
- App B: Dunlop's catalogue treats App B1–App B10 as anonymous works of uncertain authorship; the supplied data therefore does not treat them as securely attributable to Muffat.
- MC C3: the Mass in C major is incomplete.
- MC C60, C61, and C64: the supplied notes identify these works with Frescobaldi catalogue numbers F18.07S, F18.06S, and F18.08S respectively, noting that the works are misattributed to Frescobaldi.
- MC D5: Salve Regina has doubtful authorship.
- A dash (—) indicates that the supplied data contains no value for that field.
