= Prelude No. 5 (Villa-Lobos) =

Guitar piece by Heitor Villa-Lobos

Prelude No. 5 is a guitar piece written by Brazilian composer Heitor Villa-Lobos.

The piece is subtitled "Homenagem à vida social" (Homage to Social Life), is in the key of D major, marked "Poco animato", and is the second of the Five Preludes, written in 1940. The others are in E minor, E major, A minor, and E minor. It was first performed, together with its four companions, by Abel Carlevaro in Montevideo on 11 December 1943.

Written in 6/4 meter, this prelude evokes the waltzes danced by the upper classes of Rio de Janeiro in a bygone age.
