= Richard Jones (composer) =

English composer and violinist

Richard Jones (1680? - died 20 January 1744) was an English composer and violinist.

Jones's first publication appeared in 1720, a solo cantata While in a Lovely Rurall Seat. He was associated with the Drury Lane Theater Orchestra in London possibly as early as 1723; according to John Hawkins, in 1730 he succeeded Stefano Carbonelli as the orchestra's leader. He taught violin as well; Michael Christian Festing was one of his pupils. He was a stage composer at a time when Georg Frideric Handel's music dominated the British stage, and much of his music, or what of it survives, shows clear Italianate influence. He died in 1744, of which his position in Drury Lane was succeeded by Richard Clarke.

Like the details of his life, little of Jones's music survives. His pantomime stage works and ballad operas are all lost except for a keyboard reduction of the overture to The Miser and 18 pieces which are probably from the same work. His keyboard and violin suites have been noted for their wide, angular leaps and unconventional structure.

== Works ==
Stage

- Apollo and Daphne, masque (1725, music lost) (Written with John Thurmond, and Henry Carey
- The Miser, pantomime (1726, music lost; keyboard reduction survives in part) (Written with John Thurmond)
- The Mock Doctor, ballad opera (1732, music lost)
- Hymen's Triumph, pantomime (1737, music lost)

Other

- While in a Lovely Rurall Seat, cantata (1720)
- 6 Suits or Setts of Lessons for keyboard (1732)
- 8 Chamber Air's for violin and basso continuo, op. 2 (1735)
- 6 Suites of Lessons for violin and basso continuo, op. 3 (1741)
- Sonata in A minor
