= Serge Roullet =

French film director (1926–2023)

- Born: 6 July 1926; Bordeaux, France
- Died: 14 February 2023 (aged 96)
- Occupations: Film director, screenwriter
- Years active: 1959–2023

Serge Roullet (6 July 1926 – 14 February 2023) was a French film director and screenwriter. He directed five feature-length films. His 1967 film The Wall was entered into the 17th Berlin International Film Festival.

Roullet died on 14 February 2023, at the age of 96.

== Selected filmography ==
- The Wall (1967)
- Le Voyage étranger (1992)
