= Pesante =

Pesante (Italian pronunciation: [peˈzante]) is a musical term, meaning "heavy and ponderous."
