= Jad Azkoul =

Lebanese musician

Jad Azkoul (Arabic: جأد عزقول) is a teacher and concert classical guitarist who was once the student of Abel Carlevaro, and translated much of his work.

In 1997, Carlevaro declared that Azkoul was his "genuine representative", as well as being a "great master teaching alongside" him.

Azkoul is both a performer and teacher; he is often invited to give masterclasses in various festivals throughout the world.

== Critical acclaim ==
Joseph McLellan of the Washington Post said Azkoul demonstrates strong musical expression, emphasizing interpretive quality over technical speed, while also possessing advanced technical proficiency.

== Career ==
Jad Azkoul has been teaching at the Conservatoire Populaire de Musique, Danse et Théàtre (CPMDT) in Geneva since 1984.

Two notable absences were when he lived and taught in Washington DC from 1991 to 1996, and when he was in London on sabbatical leave from 2010 to 2011. Since 2010 he has also been on the music faculty at the London College of Music. He gives regular summer master classes in France at "Musicalta" in Alsace and at the "Musicales de Grillon" in Provence.
