= 24 Preludes (Shostakovich) =

1933 set of 24 preludes for solo piano by Dmitri Shostakovich

- Piano music by Dmitri Shostakovich
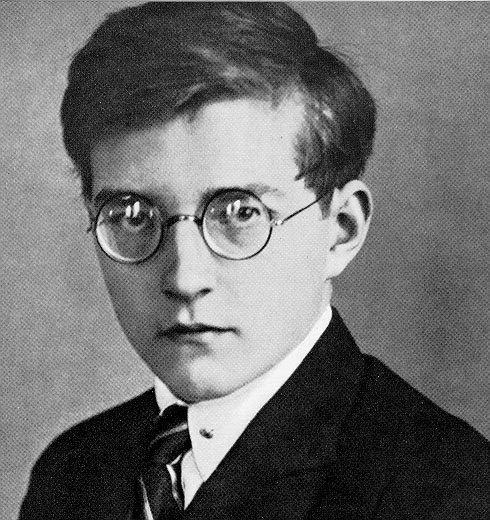
- Dmitri Shostakovich in 1925
- Key: all major and minor keys
- Opus: 34
- Composed: 1932–33

Premiere
- Date: May 1933
- Location: Moscow
- Performers: Shostakovich

The 24 Preludes, Op. 34 is a set of short piano pieces written and premiered by Dmitri Shostakovich in 1933. They are arranged following the circle of fifths, with one prelude in each major and minor key.

== Composition ==
Shostakovich began composing the preludes in December 1932, shortly after finishing his opera Lady Macbeth of the Mtsensk District. He completed the cycle in March 1933, and premiered it in Moscow himself in May of the same year. He composed the preludes largely in order to return to public performance. He had stopped performing in 1930, after his failure to place at the 1927 First International Chopin Piano Competition. The Preludes were first published by Muzgiz in 1935, two years after their premiere.

== Arrangements ==
In the 1930s, violinist Dmitri Tsyganov transcribed 19 of the preludes for violin and piano. Shostakovich stated, "When I hear the transcriptions, I forget meanwhile that I actually composed the Preludes for piano. They sound so violinistic." In 1935, Leopold Stokowski arranged no. 14 for orchestra. In 2000, composer and pianist Lera Auerbach made an arrangement of the remaining five preludes. Pianist Gintaras Januševičius and actor Steven Markusfeld adapted the Preludes to the texts by poet Daniil Charms for their 2022 narrative programme "Damn Black Ice & Giant Cucumbers".
