= Johann Caspar Ferdinand Fischer =

German Baroque composer (c. 1656 – 1746)

- Born: c. 1656; Schönfeld (Czech: Krásno nad Teplou)
- Died: 27 August 1746; Rastatt, Margravial Baden
- Occupations: Organist; Composer; Court chapel master
- Known for: bringing many French elements through Jean-Baptiste Lully (his instructor) into music

Johann Caspar Ferdinand Fischer (some authorities use the spelling Johann Kaspar Ferdinand Fischer) (c.1656 – 27 August 1746) was a German Baroque composer. Johann Nikolaus Forkel ranked Fischer as one of the best composers for keyboard of his day; partly due to the scarcity of surviving copies of his music, however, his music is rarely heard today.

== Life ==
Fischer seems to have been of Bohemian origin, possibly born at Schönfeld, but details about his life are sketchy. Fischer was baptized and spent his youth in Schlackenwerth, north-west Bohemia.

The first record of his existence is found in the mid-1690s: by 1695 he was Kapellmeister to Ludwig Wilhelm of Baden, and he may have remained with the court until his death in Rastatt.

== Works ==
Prelude and Chaconne
Performed on a clavichord by Joan Benson

Much of Fischer's music shows the influence of the French Baroque style, exemplified by Jean Baptiste Lully, and he was responsible for bringing the French influence to German music. Fischer's harpsichord suites updated the standard Froberger model (Allemande - Courante - Sarabande - Gigue); he was also one of the first composers to apply the principles of the orchestral suite to the harpsichord, replacing the standard French ouverture with an unmeasured prelude. Both Bach and Handel knew Fischer's work and sometimes borrowed from it.

Many compositions by Fischer were published during his lifetime. These published pieces include:

- Le journal du printemps (1695), a collection of eight orchestral suites (ouvertures) for strings (the first and last with two trumpets ad libitum, that is, optional.) Each suite begins with an introductory ouverture and ends with a chaconne or a passacaglia. Le Journal du printemps, Georg Muffat's Florilegium and Benedikt Anton Aufschnaiter's Concors Discordia (all published the same year) were the first collections of orchestral suites published in Germany.
- Pièces de Clavessin (1696), several harpsichord suites. The suites explore different styles and genres: for instance, the 5th one consists of an aria and nine variations, and the 8th only includes a prelude and a chaconne. This collection was later expanded by Fischer and the new version was published in 1698 under the title Musicalisches Blumen-Büchlein.
- Vesperae seu Psalmi vespertini (1701), a collection of sacred music.
- Ariadne musica (also known as Ariadne musica Neo-organoedum, 1702). This is a collection of pipe organ pieces (most written for manuals only or have optional pedal) in two parts:
  - The first part contains twenty preludes and fugues in nineteen different keys and one in the Phrygian mode based on E. It is considered a significant precursor to Johann Sebastian Bach's The Well-Tempered Clavier. Bach held Fischer's work in high regard.
  - The second part contains five ricercars based on chorale melodies.
- Lytaniae Lauretanae VII (1711), a collection of sacred music.
- Blumen-Strauss (before 1736), a collection of organ pieces, with eight sets each containing a prelude, six fugues and a finale or postlude according to the ecclesiastical 8-tone Gregorian mode tradition
- Musikalischer Parnassus (Musical Parnassus, c. 1738), nine dance suites for harpsichord, each named after one of the Muses. The suites represent a fusion of German and French styles, updating the old Froberger model by inserting many additional movements, making use of the latest dance forms of the time and using new ideas such as double minuets and double rigaudons. As a result, some of the suites include as many as nine parts and are quite long. The longest movement of all in the Musikalischer Parnassus and the longest movement by Fischer still extant is the Passacaglia from the Uranie suite, which some experts believe may recount the tragedy of Orpheus and Eurydice. This movement is probably Fischer's best-known piece, and has been recorded by William Christie, Trevor Pinnock, and by other harpsichordists.

Evidence exists of numerous lost works, among them an opera in Italian style, miscellaneous chamber works, court music and keyboard pieces.

== Sources ==
- Johann Sebastian Bach: His Life, Art, and Work at Project Gutenberg by Johann Nikolaus Forkel, translated by Charles Sanford Terry. New York: Harcourt, Brace and Howe. 1920 (e-version: 2011).
- Hoffmann-Erbrecht, Lothar (2001). "Walter, Rudolf". Grove Music Online (8th ed.). Oxford University Press. doi:10.1093/gmo/9781561592630.article.47805. ISBN 978-1-56159-263-0. (subscription, Wikilibrary access, or UK public library membership required) Johann Caspar Ferdinand Fischer, Hofkapellmeister der Markgrafen von Baden (Quellen und Studien zur Musikgeschichte von der Antike bis in die Gegenwart), Frankfurt am Main: Peter Lang (1990) ISBN 3-8204-9976-8
