= Abel Carlevaro =

Uruguayan musician

- Born: Abel Carlevaro Casal; 16 December 1916; Montevideo, Uruguay
- Died: 17 July 2001, aged 84; Berlin, Germany
- Occupations: composer, teacher, guitar

Abel Carlevaro (16 December 1916 – 17 July 2001) was a classical guitar composer and teacher born in Montevideo, Uruguay. He established a new school of instrumental technique, incorporating a fresh approach to seating and playing the guitar, based on anatomical principles.

He had a successful career as a concert artist and gained the admiration of musicians such as Heitor Villa-Lobos and Andrés Segovia. His performances in the important music centres of Europe, Latin America and the United States were met with high acclaim by the public and critics alike.

== Career ==
Carlevaro was a devoted composer. His musical production ranges from his Preludios Americanos, now established as part of the standard concert repertoire, to his Concierto No. 3 para Guitarra y Orquesta, composed by request of and played for the first time by The Chamber Symphony of San Francisco.

Other contemporary ensembles of renown such as The San Francisco Contemporary Music Players and The Kronos Quartet have also performed some of Carlevaro's works for the first time. His "Concierto del Plata" for guitar and orchestra has been interpreted by important European and American symphony orchestras.

The Carlevaro Technique & Carlevaro Guitar

A teacher, Carlevaro was the creator of a new school of instrumental technique. This contribution to the guitar is expounded in his didactic series (the "Cuadernos"), "Escuela de la Guitarra Exposición de la Teoría Instrumental" (School of Guitar Exposition of Instrumental Theory) as well as in the "Carlevaro Masterclass" series.

An indefatigable researcher, Carlevaro has also invented a new guitar (Concert-Guitar Model "Carlevaro"), the conception and design of which break away from traditional guitar making. This special model of guitar was first built in 1983 by the Spanish luthier Manuel Contreras (father) in Madrid. The upper part of the sound box (on which the guitarists arm rests) was straight, while the bottom (that rests on the guitarist's leg) is curved as usual. The resulting soundboard resembled the shape of a grand piano. Carlevaro said that this shape improved the vibration of the lower notes. This new guitar also had the normal round sound hole closed, having instead a thin "slot" (a sound-slot instead of a sound-hole) all around the curvature of top: The top is actually separated from the sides - the top is quasi-floating, and is held in place only by wooden pins from the sides. Thus the guitar consists of 2 quasi-disjoint parts (held together only by the wooden pins): a) the back and sides b) the top. Today the Model "Carlevaro Guitar" is made by Eberhard Kreul (from Erlbach, Germany; where there are many great luthiers).

When traveling abroad, Carlevaro was often invited to teach Master Classes, where in the course of a few consecutive days, students of all levels brought him their inquiries about technique, fingering, expression, or the like. Carlevaro invited participants to play the piece or section in question, and listened attentively. After the student's performance was over, he gave his opinion (most of the times an encouraging one) and his advice. On most occasions he also asked to try the guitar, examined it, tuned it, and then played the same piece or passage again to the appreciation of participants and audience.

Some of Carlevaro's "star pupils", winners of several important international contests are Eduardo Fernández, Álvaro Pierri, Baltazar Benítez, Miguel Ángel Girollet, José Fernández Bardesio as well as his teaching assistants Patrick Zeoli, Alfredo Escande (the author of his biography in Spanish: "Abel Carlevaro - Un nuevo mundo en la guitarra"), Bartolomé Díaz and Jad Azkoul, who also translated several of his works. In 1997, Carlevaro declared that Azkoul was his "genuine representative", as well as being a "great master teaching alongside" him. Eduardo Castañera, María Isabel Siewers, Néstor Ausqui, José Luis Merlin from Argentina, Daniel Wolff from Brazil, Berta Rojas from Paraguay, Janez Gregoric from Austria, Gentaro Takada, from Japan, and Ricardo Barceló, from Uruguay, have also been Carlevaro students, as well as many others from South America and many other parts of the world. From Spain we can name Juan Luis Torres Román, Manuel Gómez Ortigosa and Pompeyo Pérez Díaz, performer and musicologist author of the main academic book about Dionisio Aguado and the 19th century guitar.

Carlevaro continued teaching and performing until his last days.

== Legacy ==
On 6 May 1997, Abel Carlevaro certified fellow classical guitarist Jad Azkoul as his "genuine representative", stating that Azkoul had been a "great master teaching alongside" him.

In 2014, the Uruguayan government inaugurated a statue in his honor on the Montevideo coastline.

== Publications ==
- Serie didáctica (Barry Editorial)
  - Cuaderno N°1 - Escalas Diatónicas
  - Cuaderno N°2 - Técnica de la mano derecha
  - Cuaderno N°3 - Técnica de la mano izquierda
  - Cuaderno N°4 - Técnica de la mano Izq. Conclusión
- Numerous other publications are published/distributed by Chanterelle Verlag: 1 2
