= Lyapunov =

Lyapunov (Russian: Ляпунов, in old-Russian often written Лепунов) is a Russian surname that is sometimes also romanized as Ljapunov, Liapunov or Ljapunow. Notable people with the surname include:

- Alexey Lyapunov (1911–1973), Russian mathematician
- Aleksandr Lyapunov (1857–1918), son of Mikhail (1820–1868), Russian mathematician and mechanician, after whom the following are named:
  - Lyapunov dimension
  - Lyapunov equation
  - Lyapunov exponent
  - Lyapunov function
  - Lyapunov fractal
  - Lyapunov stability
  - Lyapunov's central limit theorem
  - Lyapunov time
  - Lyapunov vector
  - Lyapunov (crater)
- Boris Lyapunov (1862–1943), son of Mikhail (1820–1868), Russian expert in Slavic studies
- Mikhail Lyapunov (1820–1868), Russian astronomer
- Mikhail Nikolaevich Lyapunov (1848–1909), Russian military officer and lawyer
- Prokopy Lyapunov (d. 1611), Russian statesman
- Sergei Lyapunov (1859–1924), son of Mikhail (1820–1868), Russian composer
- Zakhary Lyapunov (d. after 1612), Russian statesman, Prokopy Lyapunov's brother

== See also ==
- Lyapunov family, a Russian noble family, to which not all the above individuals necessarily belong
