= Lyapunov theorem =

Lyapunov theorem may refer to:

- Lyapunov theory, a theorem related to the stability of solutions of differential equations near a point of equilibrium
- Lyapunov central limit theorem, variant of the central limit theorem
- Lyapunov vector-measure theorem, theorem in measure theory that the range of any real-valued, non-atomic vector measure is compact and convex
- Lyapunov–Malkin theorem, a mathematical theorem detailing nonlinear stability of systems

== See also ==
- Aleksandr Lyapunov (1857-1918), Russian mathematician, mechanician and physicist
- Lyapunov equation, used in many branches of control theory, such as stability analysis and optimal control
- Lyapunov fractal, bifurcational fractals derived from an extension of the logistic map in which the degree of the growth of the population periodically switches between two values
- Lyapunov time, characteristic timescale on which a dynamical system is chaotic
- Probability theory, the branch of mathematics concerned with probability
- Dirichlet problem, the problem of finding a function which solves a specified partial differential equation in the interior of a given region that takes prescribed values on the boundary of the region
