= Lyapunov dimension =

Mathematical concept

In the mathematics of dynamical systems, the concept of Lyapunov dimension was suggested by Kaplan and Yorke for estimating the Hausdorff dimension of attractors. Further the concept has been developed and rigorously justified in a number of papers, and nowadays various different approaches to the definition of Lyapunov dimension are used. Attractors with noninteger Hausdorff dimension are called strange attractors. Since the direct numerical computation of the Hausdorff dimension of attractors is often a problem of high numerical complexity, estimations via the Lyapunov dimension became widely spread. The Lyapunov dimension was named after the Russian mathematician Aleksandr Lyapunov because of the close connection with the Lyapunov exponents.

== Definitions ==
Consider a dynamical system $\big(\{\varphi^t\}_{t\geq0}, (U\subseteq \mathbb{R}^n, \|\cdot\|)\big)$, where $\varphi^t$ is the shift operator along the solutions: $\varphi^t(u_0) = u(t,u_0)$, of ODE $\dot{u} = f({u})$, $t \leq 0$, or difference equation ${u}(t+1) = f({u}(t))$, $t=0,1,...$, with continuously differentiable vector-function $f$. Then $D\varphi^t(u)$ is the fundamental matrix of solutions of linearized system and denote by $\sigma_i(t,u) = \sigma_i(D\varphi^t(u)), \ i = 1...n$, singular values with respect to their algebraic multiplicity, ordered by decreasing for any $u$ and $t$.

=== Definition via finite-time Lyapunov dimension ===
The concept of finite-time Lyapunov dimension and related definition of the Lyapunov dimension, developed in the works by N. Kuznetsov, is convenient for the numerical experiments where only finite time can be observed. Consider an analog of the Kaplan–Yorke formula for the finite-time Lyapunov exponents:

$$d_{\rm KY}(\{ {\rm LE}_i(t,u)\}_{i=1}^n)=j(t,u) +
\frac{ {\rm LE}_1(t,u) + \cdots + {\rm LE}_{j(t,u)}(t,u)}{| {\rm LE}_{j(t,u)+1}(t,u)|},$$
$$j(t,u) = \max\{m: \sum_{i=1}^m {\rm LE}_i(t,u) \geq 0\},$$

with respect to the ordered set of finite-time Lyapunov exponents $\{{\rm LE}_i(t,u)\}_{i=1}^n = \{\frac{1}{t}\ln\sigma_i(t,u)\}_{i=1}^n$ at the point $u$. The finite-time Lyapunov dimension of dynamical system with respect to invariant set $K$ is defined as follows

$$\dim_{\rm L}(t, K) = \sup\limits_{u \in K}
d_{\rm KY}(\{{\rm LE}_i(t,u)\}_{i=1}^n).$$

In this approach the use of the analog of Kaplan–Yorke formula is rigorously justified by the Douady–Oesterlè theorem, which proves that for any fixed $t > 0$ the finite-time Lyapunov dimension for a closed bounded invariant set $K$ is an upper estimate of the Hausdorff dimension:

$$\dim_{\rm H} K \leq \dim_{\rm L}(t, K).$$

Looking for best such estimation $\inf_{t>0} \dim_{\rm L} (t, K) = \liminf_{t \to +\infty}\sup\limits_{u \in K} \dim_{\rm L}(t,u)$, the Lyapunov dimension is defined as follows:

$$\dim_{\rm L} K = \liminf_{t \to +\infty}\sup\limits_{u \in K} \dim_{\rm L}(t,u).$$

The possibilities of changing the order of the time limit and the supremum over set is discussed, e.g., in.

Note that the above defined Lyapunov dimension is invariant under Lipschitz diffeomorphisms.

==== Exact Lyapunov dimension ====
Let the Jacobian matrix $Df(u_\text{eq})$ at one of the equilibria have simple real eigenvalues: $\{\lambda_i(u_\text{eq})\}_{i=1}^n, \lambda_{i}(u_\text{eq}) \geq \lambda_{i+1}(u_\text{eq})$, then

$$\dim_{\rm L}u_\text{eq} = d_{\rm KY}(\{\lambda_i(u_\text{eq})\}_{i=1}^n).$$

If the supremum of local Lyapunov dimensions on the global attractor, which involves all equilibria, is achieved at an equilibrium point, then this allows one to get analytical formula of the exact Lyapunov dimension of the global attractor (see corresponding Eden’s conjecture).

=== Definition via statistical physics approach and ergodicity ===
Following the statistical physics approach and assuming the ergodicity the Lyapunov dimension of attractor is estimated by limit value of the local Lyapunov dimension $\lim_{t\to+\infty}\dim_{\rm L} (t, u_0)$ of a typical trajectory, which belongs to the attractor. In this case $\{\lim\limits_{t\to+\infty}{\rm LE}_i(t,u_0)\}_{i}^n = \{ {\rm LE}_i(u_0)\}_1^n$ and $\dim_{\rm L}u_0= d_{\rm KY}(\{ {\rm LE}_i(u_0)\}_{i=1}^n)=j(u_0) + \frac{ {\rm LE}_1(u_0) + \cdots + {\rm LE}_{j(u_0)}(u_0)}{| {\rm LE}_{j(u_0)+1}(u_0)|}$. From a practical point of view, the rigorous use of ergodic Oseledec theorem, verification that the considered trajectory $u(t,u_0)$ is a typical trajectory, and the use of corresponding Kaplan–Yorke formula is a challenging task (see, e.g. discussions in). The exact limit values of finite-time Lyapunov exponents, if they exist and are the same for all $u_0 \in U$, are called the absolute ones $\{\lim\limits_{t\to+\infty}{\rm LE}_i(t,u_0)\}_{i}^n = \{ {\rm LE}_i(u_0)\}_1^n \equiv \{ {\rm LE}_i \}_1^n$ and used in the Kaplan–Yorke formula. Examples of the rigorous use of the ergodic theory for the computation of the Lyapunov exponents and dimension can be found in.
