= Piano Sextet (Lyapunov) =

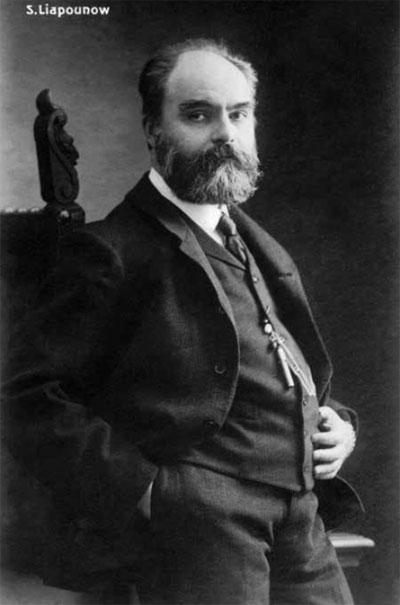
Portrait of Sergei Lyapunov

The Piano Sextet in B♭ minor, Op. 63 is the only piece of chamber music by Russian composer Sergei Lyapunov. It is scored for a rather unusual ensemble of piano, 2 violins, viola, cello and double bass. A typical performance takes 35–40 minutes.

== Composition history ==
Lyapunov worked on the Sextet in January—March 1916, and the first performance took place on 30 April that year in a concert at the Petrograd Conservatory with the composer playing the piano part. It was one of the most important concerts in Lyapunov's career, in the second half of which the complete cycle of his 12 Transcendental Études was performed for the first time in Russia. Soon after that, the fair copy of the sextet was mislaid by composer in his country house (all the drafts and rough copies were destroyed by him, according to his habit), after the work was in print. However, in a war-time accident, all the printed copies were lost. Some portions of the proofs survived, and some separate instrumental voices, with the help of which the composer reconstructed the sextet in its complete form, in August 1921.

In autumn 1923 the fair copy of the new version was taken by Lyapunov to Paris together with manuscripts of other major compositions unpublished by that time: Symphony No. 2, Violin Concerto and cantata The Evening Song, as he intended to perform them. All these papers were lost after his death (1924), perhaps during the German occupation of Paris. The Sextet was published by Zimmermann in the first half of 1920s. This final version of 1921 is now known as the second version.

The sextet is dedicated to Zenaïde Schandarowska (née von Hennings, in Russian: Зинаида Оскаровна Шандаровская), who studied with Lyapunov in Saint Petersburg Conservatory and was one of his favorite pupils. The dedication of the sextet was a gift for Schandarowska after her graduation. Lyapunov used to combine his pupils in groups of three, and the two fellow-students of Schandarowska also received a composition dedicated to each of them: Sonatina, Op. 65 was dedicated to Nadezhda Golubovskaya, and Valse-Impromptu No. 3, Op. 70 to Alexandrine Belaiewa-Bokola (née Bouchene).

The third movement, Nocturne, is based on an unpublished Nocturne in F♯ major for piano, composed by Lyapunov in July 1914.

== Structure ==
The sextet is in traditional four movements.

1. Allegro maestoso
2. Scherzo. Allegro vivace
3. Nocturne. Lento ma non troppo
4. Finale. Allegro risoluto

== Recordings ==
- (rec. 2003) Lyapunov: Sextet; Gretchaninov: String Quartet No. 3 — Dante Quartet (Krysia Osostowicz, Matthew Truscott, Judith Busbridge, Pierre Doumenge), with John Thwaites and Leon Bosch — Dutton CDSA6880
- (rec. 2016/17) Glinka, Tchaikovsky, Lyapunov: Gran sestetto — Fabergé-quintett (Rodrigo Reichel, Xabier de Felipe Prieto, Erik Wenbo Xu, Sven Forsberg, Peter Schmidt), with Ulrike Payer — ES-DUR ES 2072
