= Stretching field =

In applied mathematics, stretching fields provide the local deformation of an infinitesimal circular fluid element over a finite time interval ∆t. The logarithm of the stretching (after first dividing by ∆t) gives the finite-time Lyapunov exponent λ for separation of nearby fluid elements at each point in a flow. For periodic two-dimensional flows, stretching fields have been shown to be closely related to the mixing of a passive scalar concentration field. Until recently, however, the extension of these ideas to systems that are non-periodic or weakly turbulent has been possible only in numerical simulations.
