= Hideko Udagawa =

Japanese musician

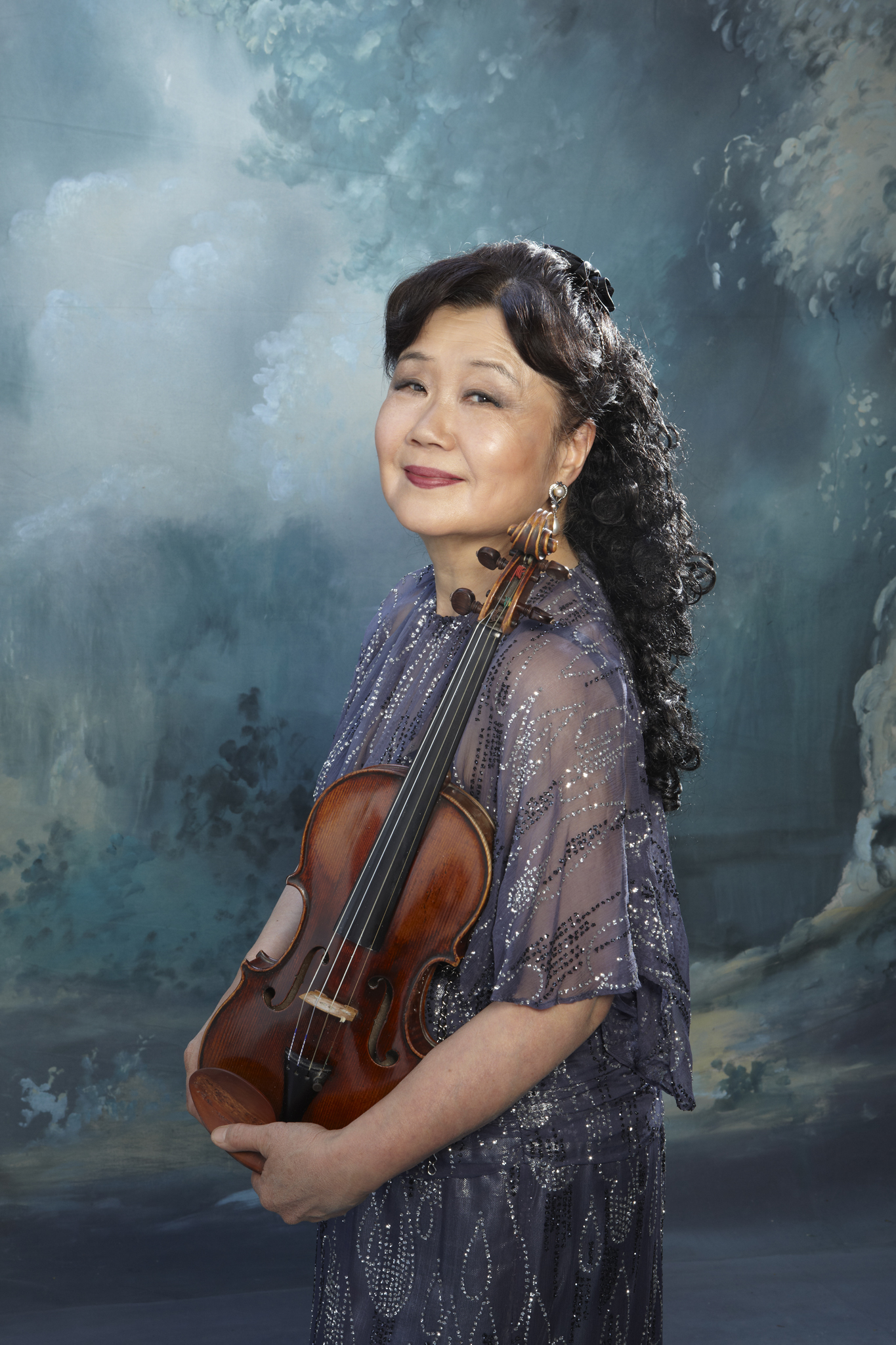
- Education: Juilliard School
- Occupation: violinist

Hideko Udagawa is a Japanese violinist based in London, United Kingdom.

== Early years and education ==
Hideko Udagawa is the great-granddaughter of former Japanese prime minister Lord Ii Naosuke. She was a student of Nathan Milstein while in London and at the Juilliard School in New York.

== Career ==
Hideko Udagawa's international performances span thirty countries across Europe, North America – including a tour encompassing twelve cities with the Mozarteum Orchestra of Salzburg – and Asia-Pacific with the Warsaw Philharmonic under Kazimierz Kord. In addition she has toured extensively throughout towns and cities in Great Britain.

She made her debut with the London Symphony Orchestra under Sir Charles Mackerras with a performance of Max Bruch's Violin Concerto. The concert took place at Barbican Hall.

Performance highlights include: Philharmonia under Leonard Slatkin, Royal Philharmonic under Paavo Järvi, Royal Liverpool Philharmonic under Marek Janowski, City of Birmingham Symphony Orchestra under Okko Kamu, London Mozart Players under Matthias Bamert, Russian National under Paavo Berglund, Moscow Philharmonic under Fedor Glushchenko, and English Chamber Orchestra, National Symphony Orchestra and Bavarian Radio Orchestra. As a guest soloist, she has toured with many UK-visiting orchestras including the Berlin Symphony, Polish Chamber and Bucharest Philharmonic and her festival appearances include the George Enescu, City of London, Norfolk & Norwich, Perth, Brno, Ankara and Assisi festivals. Hideko Udagawa has also given 10 recitals at the Queen Elizabeth Hall, South Bank.

Hideko Udagawa has recorded for leading, independent classical record label Signum as well as her current label, Nimbus. She also recorded both Bruch and Brahms Violin Concertos with the London Symphony Orchestra, conducted by Sir Charles Mackerras for Chandos Records. Her CD of works by Rachmaninov with pianist Konstantin Lifschitz (Signum, 2009) is the first-ever collection of the composer's works and includes previously unrecorded pieces. The next release with Signum (2010) was selected as 'Presenter's Choice' by Classic FM Magazine. Romantic Novelties with the Philharmonia Orchestra coincided with a recital at Cadogan Hall and includes works for violin and orchestra by Joachim and Ysaye. During Autumn 2011 she recorded Khachaturian's Concerto-Rhapsody and Lyapunov's Concerto with the Royal Philharmonic Orchestra (Signum, 2012)

Early in 2015, on Nimbus, Hideko Udagawa recorded rare 18th-century concertos with the Scottish Chamber Orchestra and conductor Nicholas Kraemer (Baroque Inspirations), and in the following September Glazounov's Concerto for Violin and Orchestra together with other works by Tchaikovsky, Chausson, Sarasate and Saint-Saens with the London Philharmonic. Other recordings on Nimbus include a CD devoted to the violin and piano music of Aram Khachaturian with Boris Berezovsky.

Hideko Udagawa has lived in Tokyo and New York and is currently based in London.

== Honours and awards ==
- Performed in Tokyo in the presence of Imperial Highnesses, the Crown Prince and Princess of Japan.
- Performed for the United Nations including the 50th anniversary concerts at the Konzerthaus, Vienna and the Victoria Hall, Geneva, Switzerland.

== Recordings ==
- Rachmaninov: For Violin and Piano, w/ Konstantin Lifschitz (2009)
- Baroque Inspirations: Scottish Chamber Orchestra / Nicholas Kraemer (2015)
- Khachaturian / Lyapunov: Royal Philharmonic Orchestra / Buribayev (2012)
- Glazounov: Concerto for Violin and Orchestra, London Philharmonic Orchestra / Klein (2015)
- Khachaturian: Violin Sonata and Dances from Gayaneh & Spartacus, w/ Boris Berezovsky (2014)
- Brahms & Bruch: Violin Concertos, London Symphony Orchestra / Sir Charles Mackerras (2014)
- Romantic Novelties For Violin & Orchestra: Philharmonia Orchestra / Brabbins (2010)
- Hideko Udagawa Plays Heifetz Transcriptions: w/ Pavel Gililov (1988)
- Khachaturian: Sonata and Dances: w/ Boris Beresovsky (2003)
