= Valeriy Oseledets =

Soviet and Russian mathematician (1940–2025)

Valeriy Iustinovich Oseledets (Russian: Валерий Иустинович Оселедец; 25 May 1940 – 13 March 2025) was a Soviet and Russian mathematician.

== Biography ==
Oseledets was born on 25 May 1940, in the Soviet Union. He completed his undergraduate program in 1962 from Lomonosov Moscow State University, where he studied probability theory. In 1965, he proved the Oseledets Theorem, named after himself. He received his Ph.D. under advisor Yakov Sinai in 1967.

He was a faculty member and professor under the Department of Mechanics and Mathematics at Lomonosov Moscow State University. His work primarily focused on statistical mechanics, stochastic analysis, dynamical systems, and probability. Oseledets died on 13 March 2025, at the age of 84.

== Awards ==
- Kolmogorov Prize: he received this award in 2009.
