= Lyapunov family =

15th-century Russian noble family

Lyapunov family Ляпуно́вы
- noble family
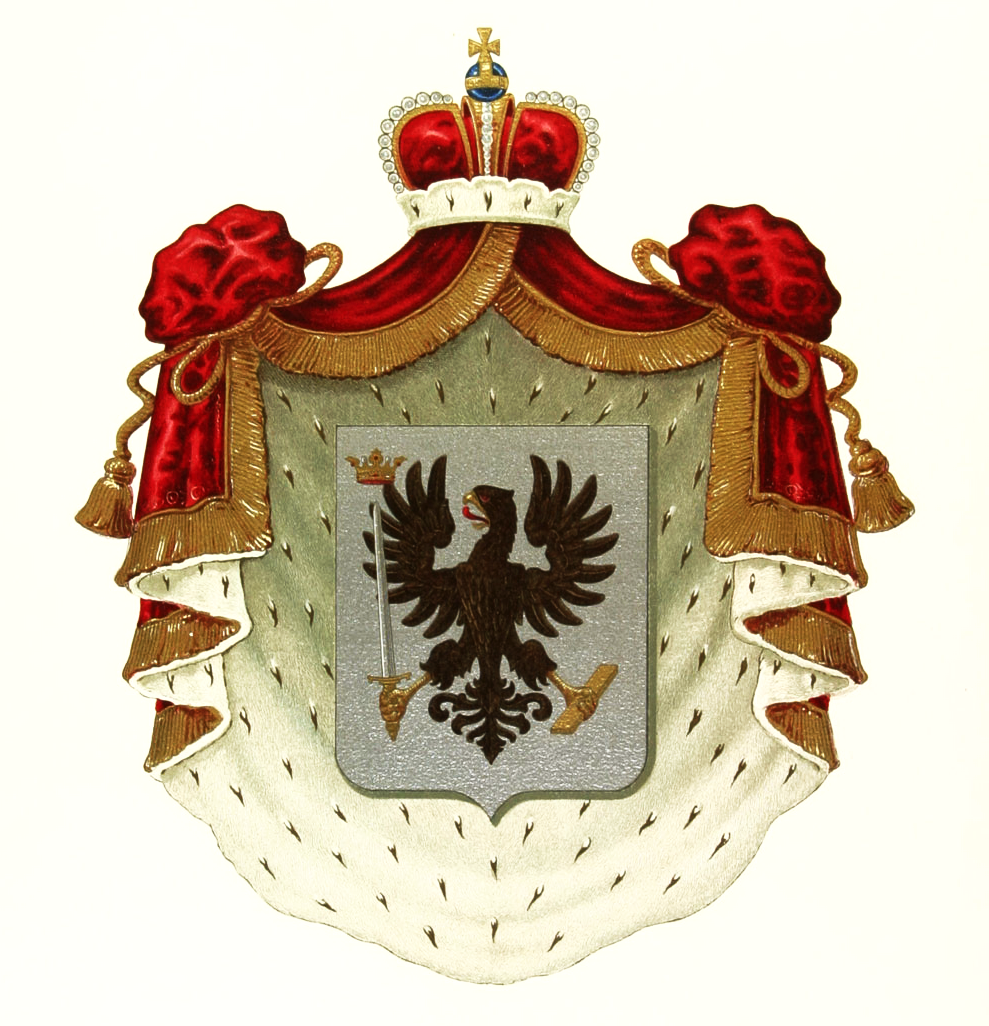
- Coat-of-arms of the Lyapunov family
- Parent family: Rurik dynasty
- Place of origin: Galich, Russia
- Founded: 16th century
- Founder: Lyapun Borisovich Osinin

The Lyapunov family (Russian: Ляпуно́в) is a Russian noble family claiming descent from the Galich Rurikids, who lost their princely title in the 15th century. (Note: Their descent from Rurik is disputed by some historians, such as Sergey Soloviev.) The family later served the archbishop of Veliky Novgorod, and subsequently integrated into the Ryazanian nobility.

== History ==
=== Origin and name ===
It's known that Lyapunov brothers were descendants of a family of Konstantin Yaroslavich of Galich and one of his sons, dukes of the Duchy of Galich and Mersk both of whom itself belonged to Rurik Dynasty. Their ancestors ruled in the Principality of Galich (an appanage of the Vladimir-Suzdal Duchy), until Duke Dmitry Donskoy, Grand Duke (Prince) of Moscow annexed their domain in 1362 and exiled Prince Dmitry Ivanovich of Galich, who fled to Veliky Novgorod where he entered the service to the local archbishop. Around this time Lyapunov family has lost their Duke title (the exact date is unknown though) and were considered boyars of the Novgorodian archbishop.

Their sons, the great-grandsons of Prince Vladimir Dmitrievich, namely, Dmitry Beryoza (meaning birch), Semyon Osina (meaning aspen) and Ivan Iva (meaning willow), were the progenitors of the Beryozin, Osinin, Ivin and Ilyin noble families.

Lyapunov's family ascends to a boyarin (servant) of Pimen "Black" (1571, an Archbishop of Novgorod and supporter of Ivan IV) named Ivan Borisovich Lyapun' Osypin (Russian: Иван Борисович Ляпунь Осипин), from which Lypunov (Russian: Ляпунов) family name has started. Lypynovs acquired a dvoryanin title when one of Lyapun' Osypin's grandson entered servitude of Duchy of Ryazan (dissolved around 1521) and joined the Ryazan nobility.

The grandson of Semyon Osina, Lyapun Osinin, is considered the founder of the Lyapunov family.

=== Genealogy ===
The Lyapunovs are listed in the Velvet Book and in Part 6 (Ancient Nobility) of the Kaluga, Kostroma, Moscow, Nizhny-Novgorod and Ryazan Governorates genealogical books. One of the genealogy books kept at Ryazan Krelmlin feagures Lyapunov family.

Konstantin Yaroslavich

- ?
  - Ssavich Petr Lyapunov (Russian: Ссавич Пётр Ляпунов, often referred as Лепунов, died 1587) according to Razriady records served in different cities: as Head of Cheboskary (1583), Dankov (1584, next to a Muravsky Trail); he had a wife named Denisova-Ushakova Nikiforovna Anna (Fetiniya - before marriage).
    - Prokopy Petrovich Lyapunov (? – July 22, 1611), a prominent politician and figure of Times of Troubles
      - Vladimir Prokopievich Lyapunov, Voivode of Mikhaylov (1616)
        - Anna Vladimirovna Lyapunova, wife of Dolgorukov, Fyodor Fyodorovich
        - Luka Vladimirovich Lyapunov (? – 1688; Isady, Ryazan Uezd)
    - Alexander Petrovich Lyapunov – A voivode and servant of Ivan IV, who along with Andrey V. Sherfedinov had been invading "foreign" lands with impunity because of Ivan IV's predisposition to the latter.
    - Zakhary Petrovich Lyapunov – Along with Prokopy, a notable figure of Times of Troubles who fought for False Dmitry I, and then, against False Dmitry II, deposed Tsar Vasily Shuisky on July 19, 1610, and who was a member of embassy to Sigismund III on September 11, 1610, and who sided with him and his son Władysław IV Vasa at besieged Smolensk camp; his fate after that remains unknown
      - Semyon Zakharyievich Lyapounov, a son of Zakhary P. L.
    - Grigory Petrovich Lyapunov
    - Stepan Petrovich Lyapunov

== Family estate ==
Gravestones of Petr Savvich Lyapunov, a father of Prokopy Lyapunov, and his family members were evidently destroyed by Bolsheviks in around 1937 in Isady, Ryazan Oblast familial estate. By 1961 their original familial mansion (manor house) was also demolished.

== See also ==
- Lyapunov, a family name

== Sources ==
- Долгоруков П. В. Российская родословная книга. — СПб.: Тип. 3 Отд. Собств. Е. И. В. Канцелярии, 1857. — Т. 4. — С. 15.
