= Lyapunov–Schmidt reduction =

In mathematics, the Lyapunov–Schmidt reduction or Lyapunov–Schmidt construction is used to study solutions to nonlinear equations in the case when the implicit function theorem does not work. It permits the reduction of infinite-dimensional equations in Banach spaces to finite-dimensional equations. It is named after Aleksandr Lyapunov and Erhard Schmidt.

== Problem setup ==
Let

$$f(x,\lambda)=0 \,$$

be the given nonlinear equation, $X,\Lambda,$ and $Y$ are Banach spaces ($\Lambda$ is the parameter space). $f(x,\lambda)$ is the $C^p$-map from a neighborhood of some point $(x_0,\lambda_0)\in X\times \Lambda$ to $Y$ and the equation is satisfied at this point

$$f(x_0,\lambda_0)=0.$$

For the case when the linear operator $f_x(x,\lambda)$ is invertible, the implicit function theorem assures that there exists a solution $x(\lambda)$ satisfying the equation $f(x(\lambda),\lambda)=0$ at least locally close to $\lambda_0$.

In the opposite case, when the linear operator $f_x(x,\lambda)$ is non-invertible, the Lyapunov–Schmidt reduction can be applied in the following way.

== Assumptions ==
One assumes that the operator $f_x(x,\lambda)$ is a Fredholm operator, $\ker f_x (x_0,\lambda_0)=X_1,$ and $X_1$ has finite dimension.

The range of this operator $\mathrm{ran} f_x (x_0,\lambda_0)=Y_1$ has finite co-dimension and is a closed subspace in $Y$.

Without loss of generality, one can assume that $(x_0,\lambda_0)=(0,0).$

== Lyapunov–Schmidt construction ==
Let us split $X$ and $Y$ into the direct sums $X= X_1 \oplus X_2$ and $Y= Y_1 \oplus Y_2$, respectively, where $\dim X_2, \dim Y_2 < \infty$. Also, let $Q$ be the projection operator onto $Y_1$.

Applying the operators $Q$ and $I-Q$ to the original equation and writing $x = x_1 + x_2$, one obtains the equivalent system

$$Qf(x_1 + x_2,\lambda)=0 \,$$

$$(I-Q)f(x_1 + x_2,\lambda)=0 \,$$

Viewing the first equation as a map

$$\psi: X_1 \times X_2 \times \Lambda \to Y_1$$

where

$$\psi(x_1,x_2,\lambda) = Qf(x_1 + x_2,\lambda),$$

one finds that $D_{x_2}\psi(0,0,0)[(0,x_2,0)]$ is an isomorphism. The implicit function theorem is thus applicable, in particular guaranteeing the existence of a $x_2 = x_2(x_1, \lambda)$ such that

$$Qf(x_1 + x_2(x_1,\lambda),\lambda) = 0.$$

Now plugging $x_2 = x_2(x_1,\lambda)$ into the second equation, one obtains the bifurcation equation

$$(I-Q)f(x_1+x_2(x_1,\lambda),\lambda)=0, \,$$

which is a finite-dimensional equation by the earlier assumption of $\mathrm{codim} D_x f(0,0)$ being finite. This equation is now to be solved with respect to $x_1$, which is finite-dimensional, and parameters :$\lambda$

== Applications ==
Lyapunov–Schmidt reduction has been used in economics, natural sciences, and engineering often in combination with bifurcation theory, perturbation theory, and regularization. LS reduction is often used to rigorously regularize partial differential equation models in chemical engineering resulting in models that are easier to simulate numerically but still retain all the parameters of the original model.
