= Kaplan–Yorke conjecture =

In applied mathematics, the Kaplan–Yorke conjecture concerns the dimension of an attractor, using Lyapunov exponents. By arranging the Lyapunov exponents in order from largest to smallest $\lambda_1\geq\lambda_2\geq\dots\geq\lambda_n$, let j be the largest index for which

$$\sum_{i=1}^j \lambda_i \geqslant 0$$

and

$$\sum_{i=1}^{j+1} \lambda_i < 0.$$

Then the conjecture is that the dimension of the attractor is

$$D=j+\frac{\sum_{i=1}^j\lambda_i}{|\lambda_{j+1}|}.$$

This idea is used for the definition of the Lyapunov dimension.

== Examples ==
Especially for chaotic systems, the Kaplan–Yorke conjecture is a useful tool in order to estimate the fractal dimension and the Hausdorff dimension of the corresponding attractor.

- The Hénon map with parameters a = 1.4 and b = 0.3 has the ordered Lyapunov exponents $\lambda_1=0.603$ and $\lambda_2=-2.34$. In this case, we find j = 1 and the dimension formula reduces to

$$D=j+\frac{\lambda_1}{|\lambda_2|}=1+\frac{0.603}{|{-2.34}|}=1.26.$$

- The Lorenz system shows chaotic behavior at the parameter values $\sigma=16$, $\rho=45.92$ and $\beta=4.0$. The resulting Lyapunov exponents are {2.16, 0.00, −32.4}. Noting that j = 2, we find

$$D=2+\frac{2.16 + 0.00}{|-32.4|}=2.07.$$
