= 12 Transcendental Études (Lyapunov) =

Series of études written by Sergei Lyapunov

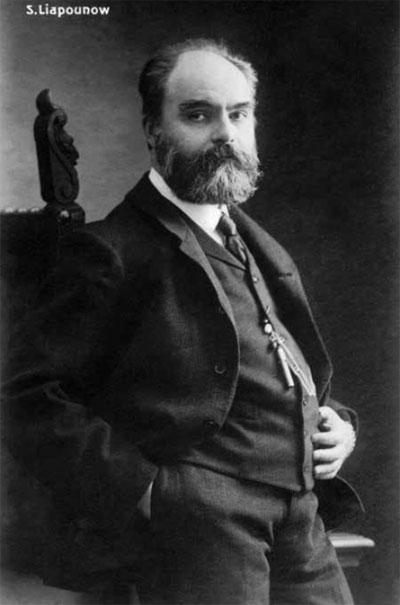
Portrait of Sergei Lyapunov

The 12 Études d’exécution transcendante (English: 12 Transcendental Études), Op. 11, are a series of 12 études written from 1897 to 1905 by Sergei Lyapunov. Lyapunov intended them to be the posthumous continuation of Franz Liszt's uncompleted work Transcendental Études, having finished only the first 12 before his death in 1886. The work is also dedicated to Liszt, with the twelfth étude being named after the composer as well.

Inspired by one of his three teachers during his time at Moscow Conservatory Karl Klindworth, a former student of Liszt, along with being heavily influenced and artistically guided by Mily Balakirev, the main ideologue of The Five, these Études use the full gamut of nationalist techniques: From folk-songs and church bells, to Caucasian melodies and sumptuous melodicism.

== Études ==
Liszt's original intention was to write 24 études in every major and minor key. However, he only completed half of this project, using the neutral and flat keys. As such, Lyapunov's études used the remaining 12 sharp keys.

1. Berceuse ("Lullaby") in F♯ major
2. Ronde des Fantômes ("The ghosts' dance") in D♯ minor
3. Carillon ("Bells") in B major
4. Térek in G♯ minor
5. Nuit d'été ("Summer night") in E major
6. Tempête ("Storm") in C♯ minor
7. Idylle in A major
8. Chant épique ("Epic song") in F♯ minor
9. Harpes éoliennes ("Aeolian harps") in D major
10. Lesghinka in B minor
11. Ronde des sylphes ("Dance of the sylphs") in G major
12. Élégie en mémoire de François Liszt ("Elegy in memory of Liszt") in E minor

== Recordings ==
- Lyapunov, S.M.: 12 Études d'exécution transcendante, Op. 11 (Scherbakov, K.) (Naxos, 1993)
- LYAPUNOV//12 Études d’exécution transcendante (Noack, Florian) (La Dolce Volta, 2021)

== Sources ==
- Onegina, Olga Vladimirovna. Piano music by S.M. Lyapunov. Style features: dissertation ... of a candidate of art history: 17.00.02 / Olga Vladimirovna Onegina; [Place of protection: St. Petersburg. state conservatory im. ON THE. Rimsky-Korsakov] .- St. Petersburg, 2010.- 292 p .: ill. RSL OD, 61 10–17 / 114
