= Mikhail Lyapunov =

Russian astronomer

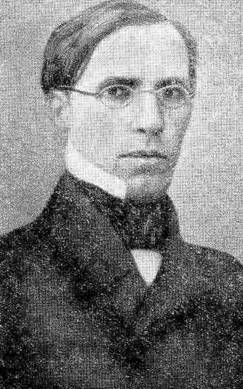

Mikhail Vasilyevich Lyapunov (12 October [O.S. 30 September] 1820 – 2 December [O.S. 20 November] 1868) was a Russian astronomer and a head of the Demidov Lyceum in Yaroslavl.

He was the father of Aleksandr and Sergei Lyapunov.
