= Oseledets theorem =

Theorem about cocycles

In mathematics, the multiplicative ergodic theorem, or Oseledets theorem provides the theoretical background for computation of Lyapunov exponents of a nonlinear dynamical system. It was proved by Valery Oseledets (also spelled "Oseledec") in 1965 and reported at the International Mathematical Congress in Moscow in 1966. A conceptually different proof of the multiplicative ergodic theorem was found by M. S. Raghunathan. The theorem has been extended to semisimple Lie groups by V. A. Kaimanovich and further generalized in the works of David Ruelle, Grigory Margulis, Anders Karlsson, and François Ledrappier.

== Cocycles ==
The multiplicative ergodic theorem is stated in terms of matrix cocycles of a dynamical system. The theorem states conditions for the existence of the defining limits and describes the Lyapunov exponents. It does not address the rate of convergence.

A cocycle of an autonomous dynamical system X is a map C : X×T → R^{n×n} satisfying

$$C(x,0)=I_n {\rm~for~all~} x\in X$$

$$C(x,t+s)=C(x(t),s)\,C(x,t) {\rm~for~all~} x\in X {\rm~and~} t,s\in T$$

where X and T (with T = Z⁺ or T = R⁺) are the phase space and the time range, respectively, of the dynamical system, and I_{n} is the n-dimensional unit matrix. The dimension n of the matrices C is not related to the phase space X.

=== Examples ===
- A prominent example of a cocycle is given by the matrix J^{t} in the theory of Lyapunov exponents. In this special case, the dimension n of the matrices is the same as the dimension of the manifold X.
- For any cocycle C, the determinant det C(x, t) is a one-dimensional cocycle.

== Statement of the theorem ==
Let μ be an ergodic invariant measure on X and C a cocycle of the dynamical system such that for each t ∈ T, the maps $x \rightarrow \log\|C(x,t)\|$ and $x \rightarrow \log\|C(x,t)^{-1}\|$ are L^{1}-integrable with respect to μ. Then for μ-almost all x and each non-zero vector u ∈ R^{n} the limit

$$\lambda=\lim_{t\to\infty}{1\over t} \log{\|C(x,t)u\| \over \|u\|}$$

exists and assumes, depending on u but not on x, up to n different values. These are the Lyapunov exponents.

Further, if λ_{1} > ... > λ_{m} are the different limits then there are subspaces R^{n} = R_{1} ⊃ ... ⊃ R_{m} ⊃ R_{m+1} = {0}, depending on x, such that the limit is λ_{i} for u ∈ R_{i} \ R_{i+1} and i = 1, ..., m.

The values of the Lyapunov exponents are invariant with respect to a wide range of coordinate transformations. Suppose that g : X → X is a one-to-one map such that $\partial g/\partial x$ and its inverse exist; then the values of the Lyapunov exponents do not change.

== Additive versus multiplicative ergodic theorems ==
Verbally, ergodicity means that time and space averages are equal, formally:

$$\lim_{t\to\infty}{1\over t} \int_0^t f(x(s))\,ds = {1\over \mu(X)} \int_X f(x)\,\mu(dx)$$

where the integrals and the limit exist. Space average (right hand side, μ is an ergodic measure on X) is the accumulation of f(x) values weighted by μ(dx). Since addition is commutative, the accumulation of the f(x)μ(dx) values may be done in arbitrary order. In contrast, the time average (left hand side) suggests a specific ordering of the f(x(s)) values along the trajectory.

Since matrix multiplication is, in general, not commutative, accumulation of multiplied cocycle values (and limits thereof) according to C(x(t_{0}),t_{k}) = C(x(t_{k−1}),t_{k} − t_{k−1}) ... C(x(t_{0}),t_{1} − t_{0}) — for t_{k} large and the steps t_{i} − t_{i−1} small — makes sense only for a prescribed ordering. Thus, the time average may exist (and the theorem states that it actually exists), but there is no space average counterpart. In other words, the Oseledets theorem differs from additive ergodic theorems (such as G. D. Birkhoff's and J. von Neumann's) in that it guarantees the existence of the time average, but makes no claim about the space average.
