= Aleksandr Lyapunov =

Russian mathematician (1857–1918)

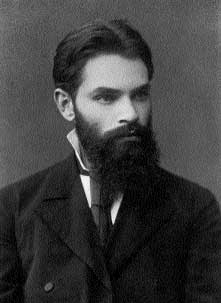
- Born: 6 June [O.S. 25 May] 1857; Yaroslavl, Russian Empire
- Died: 3 November 1918 (aged 61); Odessa, Ukrainian People's Republic
- Education: Saint Petersburg State University
- Known for: Lyapunov function Lyapunov stability Lyapunov exponent Lyapunov central limit theorem Lyapunov vector Qualitative theory of differential equations
- Scientific career
- Fields: Applied mathematics
- Workplaces: Saint Petersburg State University; Russian Academy of Sciences; Kharkov University
- Thesis: The general problem of the stability of motion (1892)
- Doctoral advisor: Pafnuty Chebyshev
- Doctoral students: Vladimir Steklov

Aleksandr Mikhailovich Lyapunov (Note: In this name that follows East Slavic naming customs, the patronymic is Mikhailovich and the family name is Lyapunov. His surname is variously romanized as Ljapunov, Liapunov, Liapounoff or Ljapunow.) (Note: Russian: Алекса́ндр Миха́йлович Ляпуно́в, IPA: [ɐlʲɪkˈsandr mʲɪˈxajləvʲɪtɕ lʲɪpʊˈnof]) (Алекса́ндр Миха́йлович Ляпуно́в, 6 June [O.S. 25 May] 1857 – 3 November 1918) was a Russian mathematician, mechanician and physicist. He was the son of the astronomer Mikhail Lyapunov and the brother of the pianist and composer Sergei Lyapunov.

Lyapunov is known for his development of the stability theory of a dynamical system, as well as for his many contributions to mathematical physics and probability theory.

== Biography ==
=== Early life ===
Lyapunov was born in Yaroslavl, Russian Empire. His father Mikhail Vasilyevich Lyapunov (1820–1868) was an astronomer employed by the Demidov Lyceum. His brother, Sergei Lyapunov, was a gifted composer and pianist. In 1863, M. V. Lyapunov retired from his scientific career and relocated his family to his wife's estate at Bolobonov, in the Simbirsk province (now Ulyanovsk Oblast). After the death of his father in 1868, Aleksandr Lyapunov was educated by his uncle R. M. Sechenov, brother of the physiologist Ivan Mikhailovich Sechenov. At his uncle's family, Lyapunov studied with his distant cousin Natalia Rafailovna, who became his wife in 1886. In 1870, his mother moved with her sons to Nizhny Novgorod, where he started the third class of the gymnasium. He graduated from the gymnasium with distinction in 1876.

=== Education ===
In 1876, Lyapunov entered the Physico-Mathematical department at the University of Saint Petersburg, but after one month he transferred to the Mathematics department of the university.

Among the Saint Petersburg mathematics professors were Chebyshev and his students Aleksandr Nikolaevich Korkin and Yegor Ivanovich Zolotarev. Lyapunov wrote his first independent scientific works under the guidance of the professor of mechanics, D. K. Bobylev. In 1880 Lyapunov received a gold medal for a work on hydrostatics. This was the basis for his first published scientific works On the equilibrium of a heavy body in a heavy fluid contained in a vessel of a fixed form and On the potential of hydrostatic pressure. Lyapunov also completed his university course in 1880, two years after Andrey Markov who had also graduated at Saint Petersburg University. Lyapunov maintained scientific contact with Markov throughout his life.

=== Teaching and research ===
A major theme in Lyapunov's research was the stability of a rotating fluid mass with possible astronomical application. This subject was proposed to Lyapunov by Chebyshev as a topic for his masters thesis which he submitted in 1884 with the title On the stability of ellipsoidal forms of rotating fluids. The main contribution was published in the celebrated monograph 'A.M. Lyapunov, The general problem of the stability of motion. 1892. Kharkov Mathematical Society, Kharkov, 251p. (in Russian)'. This led on to his 1892 doctoral thesis The general problem of the stability of motion. The thesis was defended in Moscow University on 12 September 1892, with Nikolai Zhukovsky and V. B. Mlodzeevski as opponents. In 1908, the Kharkov edition was translated to French and republished by the University of Toulouse: 'Probleme General de la Stabilite du Mouvement, Par M.A. Liapounoff. Traduit du russe par M.Edouard Davaux'.

In 1885, Lyapunov became privatdozent and was proposed to accept the chair of mechanics at Kharkov University, where he went the same year. About the initial stay at Kharkov, Smirnov writes in his biography of Lyapunov:

Here at first, the research activity of Lyapunov was cut short. It was necessary to work out courses and put together notes for students, which took up much time.

His student and collaborator, Vladimir Steklov, recalled his first lecture in the following way: "A handsome young man, almost of the age of the other students, came before the audience, where there was also the old Dean, professor Levakovsky, who was respected by all students. After the Dean had left, the young man with a trembled voice started to lecture a course on the dynamics of material points, instead of a course on dynamical systems. This subject was already known to the students from the lectures of professor Delarue. But what Lyapunov taught us was new to me and I had never seen this material in any textbook. All antipathy to the course was immediately blown to dust. From that day students would show Lyapunov a special respect."

=== Later years ===
Lyapunov returned to Saint Petersburg in 1902, after being elected acting member of the Academy of Science as well as ordinary professor in the Faculty of Applied Mathematics of the university. The position had been left vacant by the death of his former teacher, Chebyshev. Not having any teaching obligations, this allowed Lyapunov to focus on his studies and in particular he was able to bring to a conclusion the work on the problem of Chebyshev with which he started his scientific career.

In 1908, he took part to the Fourth International Mathematical Congress in Rome. He also participated in the publication of Euler's selected works: he was an editor of the volumes 18 and 19.

=== Death ===
By the end of June 1917, Lyapunov traveled with his wife to his brother's palace in Odessa. Lyapunov's wife was suffering from tuberculosis so they moved in accordance with her doctor's orders. She died on 31 October 1918. The same day, Lyapunov shot himself in the head, and three days later he died. By that time, he was going blind from cataracts.

== Work ==
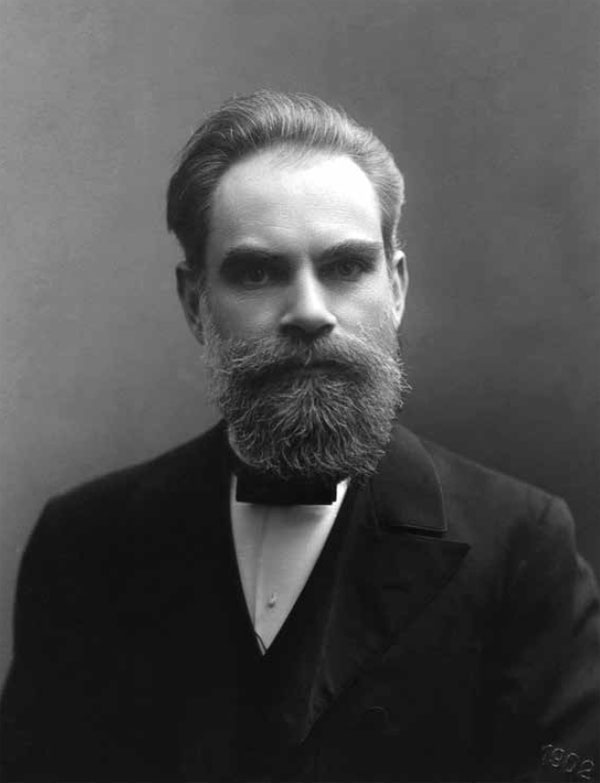
Aleksandr Lyapunov in 1908

Lyapunov contributed to several fields, including differential equations, potential theory, dynamical systems and probability theory. His main preoccupations were the stability of equilibria and the motion of mechanical systems, especially rotating fluid masses, and the study of particles under the influence of gravity. His work in the field of mathematical physics regarded the boundary value problem of the equation of Laplace. In the theory of potential, his work from 1897 On some questions connected with Dirichlet's problem clarified several important aspects of the theory. His work in this field is in close connection with the work of Steklov. Lyapunov developed many important approximation methods. His methods, which he developed in 1899, make it possible to define the stability of sets of ordinary differential equations. He created the modern theory of the stability of a dynamical system. In the theory of probability, he generalized the works of Chebyshev and Markov, and proved the Central Limit Theorem under more general conditions than his predecessors. The method of characteristic functions he used for the proof later found widespread use in probability theory.

Like many mathematicians, Lyapunov preferred to work alone and communicated mainly with few colleagues and close relatives. He usually worked late, four to five hours at night, sometimes the whole night. Once or twice a year he visited the theatre, or went to some concert. He had many students. He was an honorary member of many universities, an honorary member of the academy in Rome and a corresponding member of the Academy of Sciences in Paris.

Lyapunov's impact was significant, and the following mathematical concepts are named after him:

- Lyapunov equation
- Lyapunov exponent
- Lyapunov function
- Lyapunov fractal
- Lyapunov stability
- Lyapunov's central limit theorem
- Lyapunov vector

== Selected publications ==
- 1884, On the stability of ellipsoidal figures of equilibrium of a rotating fluid (in Russian) Published in Bulletin Astronomique 1885
- 1892, A.M. Lyapunov, The general problem of the stability of motion. 1892. Kharkov Mathematical Society, Kharkov, 251p. (in Russian)
- 1897, Sur certaines questions qui se rattachent au problème de Dirichlet
- 1901, Nouvelle forme du théorème sur la limite de probabilité
- 1901, Sur un théorème du calcul des probabilités
- 1902, Sur une série dans la théorie des équations différentielles linéaires du second ordre à coefficients périodiques
- 1903, Recherches dans la théorie de la figure des corps célestes
- 1904, Sur l'équation de Clairaut et les équations plus générales de la théorie de la figure des planètes

== See also ==
- Lyapunov equation
- Lyapunov exponent
- Lyapunov fractal
- Lyapunov function
- Lyapunov stability
- Lyapunov time
- Lyapunov's central limit theorem
- Lyapunov's condition
- Lyapunov–Malkin theorem
- Lyapunov–Schmidt reduction
