= Nikolai Kapustin =

Soviet and Russian composer (1937–2020)

- Kapustin in 2014
- Born: Николай Гиршевич Капустин; Nikolai Girshevich Kapustin; 22 November 1937; Horlivka, Ukrainian SSR, USSR
- Died: 2 July 2020 (aged 82); Moscow, Russia
- Resting place: Vostryakovo Cemetery
- Citizenship: Soviet, Russian
- Education: Moscow Conservatory
- Occupations: Pianist; Composer
- Works: List of compositions
- Children: Anton Kapustin

Nikolai Girshevich Kapustin (Russian: Никола́й Ги́ршевич Капу́стин, 22 November 1937 – 2 July 2020) was a Soviet and Russian composer and pianist. He is widely regarded as one of the most significant figures in the synthesis of jazz idioms and Western classical structures. A virtuoso of the "Moscow School" of piano playing, Kapustin composed 161 opus numbers, including 20 piano sonatas, six piano concertos, and sets of preludes and fugues, all of which utilize a sophisticated harmonic and rhythmic language derived from bebop, stride piano, and jazz fusion.

Born in Horlivka, Ukraine, Kapustin was a student of the legendary pedagogue Aleksandr Goldenweiser at the Moscow Conservatory. He rose to prominence in the 1950s and 1960s as a jazz pianist and arranger for the Oleg Lundstrem State Jazz Orchestra and later the "Blue Screen" Orchestra. Despite the improvisational sound of his music, Kapustin was a meticulous composer who wrote out every note, articulation, and nuance. He famously rejected the label of "jazz musician," insisting that he was a classical composer whose works were meant to be performed exactly as notated, without improvisation.

For much of the 20th century, Kapustin's music remained a well-kept secret within the Soviet Union, known primarily to a niche circle of musicians and studio professionals. His career underwent a global renaissance beginning in the late 1990s and early 2000s, catalyzed by the advocacy of international virtuosos such as Marc-André Hamelin, Steven Osborne, and Nikolai Petrov.

Today, Kapustin's works are considered staples of the contemporary piano repertoire and are frequently programmed by leading pianists, including Yuja Wang and Nobuyuki Tsujii. His legacy is defined by his ability to bridge the gap between two traditionally disparate musical worlds, providing classically trained musicians with a gateway to the kinetic energy and harmonic richness of jazz through the rigor of the classical tradition.

== Early life and education ==
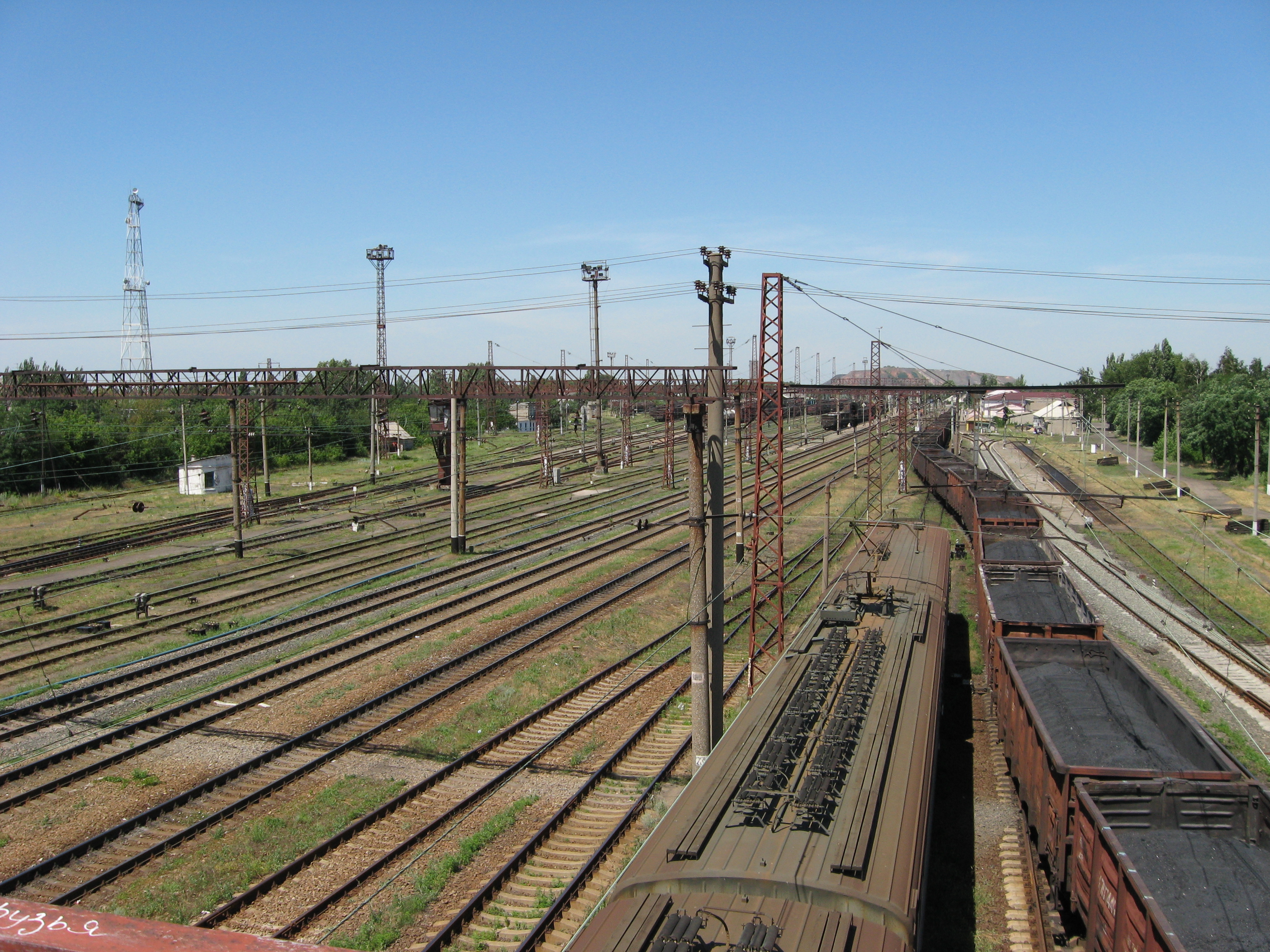
The railway at Nikitovka (Ukrainian: Микитівка, Russian: Никитовка), the historically significant railway suburb of Horlivka where Kapustin was born.

=== Childhood and wartime evacuation (1937–1943) ===
==== Family background ====
Kapustin was born in Nikitovka, a historically significant railway suburb of Horlivka, Ukraine, then part of the Soviet Union. His parents, Grigory Efimovich Kapustin (1901–1983) and Klavdia Nikolaevna Kapustina (née Kozmina, 1910–1993), were not professional musicians themselves, but they dreamed of their children pursuing music and strongly supported their education. His older sister, Fira Kapustina (born 1931), fulfilled these scientific and artistic aspirations in a different field; she became a chemist, earning her Candidate of Chemical Sciences degree in 1970, and holds patents for inventions in the field of printing inks. His mother, of Russian descent, had worked as a typist for the NKVD in Horlivka and could play the piano. His father, of Belarusian and Jewish descent, was a butcher who worked as a senior manager at a local meat factory.

Kapustin was named after his maternal grandfather, Nikolai Timofeyevich Kozmin, a military band musician who died in the trenches during the Russian Civil War. During his early years, Kapustin was raised largely by his uneducated but devoted grandmother, Pilageya Kozmina (who lived to be 103), and he grew up captivated by the traditional Russian and Ukrainian folk tales his mother told him.

==== Evacuation to Kyrgyzstan ====
Following the German invasion of the Soviet Union at the beginning of World War II in the summer of 1941, the three-year-old Kapustin, his mother, grandmother, and ten-year-old sister, Fira, were evacuated to the Kyrgyz city of Tokmok.

His father initially accompanied them but was soon ordered to join the reserve military forces in West Kazakhstan, leaving the family to endure the wartime hardships while relying on letters from the front.

In Tokmok, the family lived on the ground floor of a house with a large garden. To ward off poverty and starvation, Kapustin's mother and grandmother pickled vegetables and sold cherries and apples from their garden at the local market. Exhibiting a fiercely independent and strong-willed personality early on, the four-year-old Kapustin once protested being locked in the house while the women went to the market by taking a bite out of every single apple prepared for sale, subsequently refusing to unlock the door when they returned.

Although he was still too young for formal lessons during the family's evacuation to Tokmok, Kapustin demonstrated an unusually precocious ear for music, memorizing a complex, two-voice Kyrgyz folk melody in the Mixolydian mode entirely by ear when he was only four or five years old.

=== Initial musical training (1943–1952) ===
==== Return to Ukraine and the reclaimed piano ====
In 1943, after Ukrainian territory was reclaimed from fascist forces, the family returned to Nikitovka. They discovered that their house had been completely destroyed during the occupation, forcing them to live in the home of their neighbors for two years until Grigory returned from the war in the summer of 1945 and rebuilt their house on its original foundation.

Despite the destruction of their property, the family's piano had remarkably survived. Occupying German forces had requisitioned the instrument for their own entertainment, and after the liberation, it was transferred to the local Ukrainian administration. Upon the advice of their neighbors, Kapustin's mother successfully petitioned to reclaim the piano. Once the instrument was returned and tuned, the young Kapustin became inseparable from it, setting the stage for his intense, lifelong devotion to the instrument. Bypassing the traditional Russian music school system, he initially taught himself how to play. By asking his mother and his older sister, Fira, to explain the notes on the staff, the six-year-old Kapustin taught himself to read music and independently learned Muzio Clementi's Six Sonatinas, Op. 36.

==== Studies with Vinnichenko and Frantsuzova ====
Recognizing his exceptional, self-taught progress, Piotr Ivanovich Vinnichenko—a violinist who was originally his sister's teacher and was only eight years older than Kapustin—stepped in to become his first formal piano teacher. Under Vinnichenko, he continued to study works such as the Clementi sonatinas. Vinnichenko guided his early development from 1943 until 1949 and encouraged the family to purchase better instruments to accommodate Kapustin's rapidly advancing technique.

Realizing that the boy needed a dedicated piano specialist, Vinnichenko transferred the 12-year-old Kapustin to the class of Lubov' Frantsuzova (a student of Samuel Maykapar at the Saint Petersburg Conservatory) to prepare for the Academic Moscow College. Kapustin commuted 25 kilometers by bus every Sunday to the neighboring city of Artemovsk (now Bakhmut) for his lessons. Frantsuzova focused heavily on refining his piano tone, guiding him through standard classical repertoire including works by Beethoven, Grieg, and Mendelssohn.

==== First compositions and general education ====
Alongside his musical training, Kapustin began his general education at Elementary School No. 30 in 1945. His schooling had been delayed by a year because wartime starvation had left him physically frail. He proved to be a brilliant and independent student with a strong aptitude for physics and the French language, the latter of which he later used to read scientific and musical literature.

Demonstrating a precocious urge to create, he began composing his own music in the late 1940s. Frantsuzova actively discouraged his compositional efforts, fearing it would distract him from practicing the piano. Ignoring her advice, he composed his first piano sonata in 1950 at age 13 in a traditional academic, triadic style. He never formally studied composition as a specific subject, preferring to develop his skills through rigorous self-tuition, simply reading about sonata form in textbooks to structure his work.

==== Audition for the Moscow Musical College ====
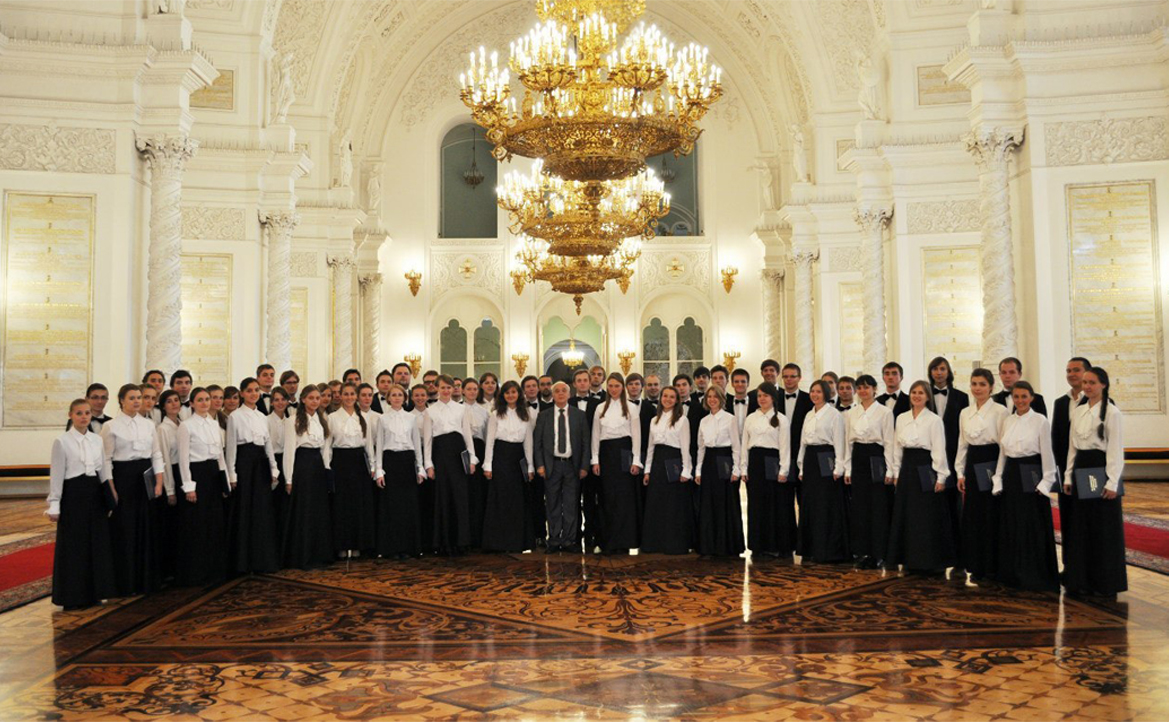
Students performing at the Academic Music College of the Moscow Conservatory, where Kapustin traveled to audition for the piano performance department in 1952.

In August 1952, the 14-year-old Kapustin traveled to Moscow with Vinnichenko to audition for the Academic Music College of the Moscow Conservatory. Vinnichenko hand-copied the manuscript of Kapustin's 1950 sonata—optimistically titling it "Piano Sonata No. 1"—as a gift to present to the Moscow faculty.

For the highly competitive piano performance audition, Kapustin played Mendelssohn's Rondo Capriccioso, Rachmaninoff's Prelude in C-sharp minor, and a Prelude and Fugue from Bach's The Well-Tempered Clavier. Because he possessed absolute pitch (perfect pitch), he flawlessly completed the musical dictation portion of the exam and was immediately exempted from the rest of the solfège requirements.

When the admission results were posted, Kapustin was devastated to find his name missing from the piano performance list. The committee, impressed by his original sonata manuscript, had unilaterally accepted him as a theoretical-composition major instead. Horrified at the prospect of being forced to study composition rather than piano, the young Kapustin burst into tears. His mother immediately traveled to Moscow and, together with the eminent pedagogue Avrelian Rubakh, successfully petitioned the administration to transfer him back to the piano performance department, securing his place in Rubakh's prestigious class.

=== College years and jazz influences (1952–1956) ===
Avrelian Grigorievich Rubbakh (1896–1976), the influential pedagogue who taught Kapustin at the Moscow Conservatory Music College. Rubbakh was a disciple of Felix Blumenfeld and instilled in Kapustin the "Moscow sound."

==== Studies under Avrelian Rubakh ====
Rubakh, whom Kapustin later credited with truly teaching him how to play the piano, was a pupil of Felix Blumenfeld (who also taught Simon Barere and Vladimir Horowitz). Representing a synthesis of the Saint Petersburg and Moscow piano traditions, Rubakh prioritized the "Moscow sound"—a full, physically tangible, and "live" piano tone—over repetitive technical drills, assigning concert études by Chopin and Moszkowski rather than scales to develop his students' technique.

Kapustin quickly developed a reputation as a fearless virtuoso. He regularly performed demanding repertoire, such as Prokofiev's Piano Concerto No. 1, and famously played Mussorgsky's Pictures at an Exhibition at the House of Unions while wearing an extravagant, Western-style bright yellow jacket. During Rubakh's 60th Jubilee concert at the Small Hall of the Moscow Conservatory in 1955, Kapustin nonchalantly played jazz boogie-woogie in the green room to ease the tension before going on stage to deliver a highly acclaimed performance of Liszt's fiendishly difficult Réminiscences de Don Juan.

==== Early compositions and self-education ====
Although he was formally studying piano performance, Kapustin was an entirely self-taught composer. He spent his college years voraciously analyzing the scores of Beethoven, Bach, Prokofiev, Bartók, and Ravel, playing through them at the piano to reverse-engineer their structures. He composed intensively during this period, producing early solo piano works in a traditional academic style, such as a Sonatina (1954), Romance in F major (1954), and Polka-Rondo (1955).

His breakthrough in stylistic fusion arrived with the Czech Rhapsody for two pianos (1956). Marking his gradual transition into a jazz-influenced compositional language, the Rhapsody was the first piece where Kapustin consciously integrated complex jazz chords and idioms into a classical framework.

==== The Mikhalkov household and Voice of America ====
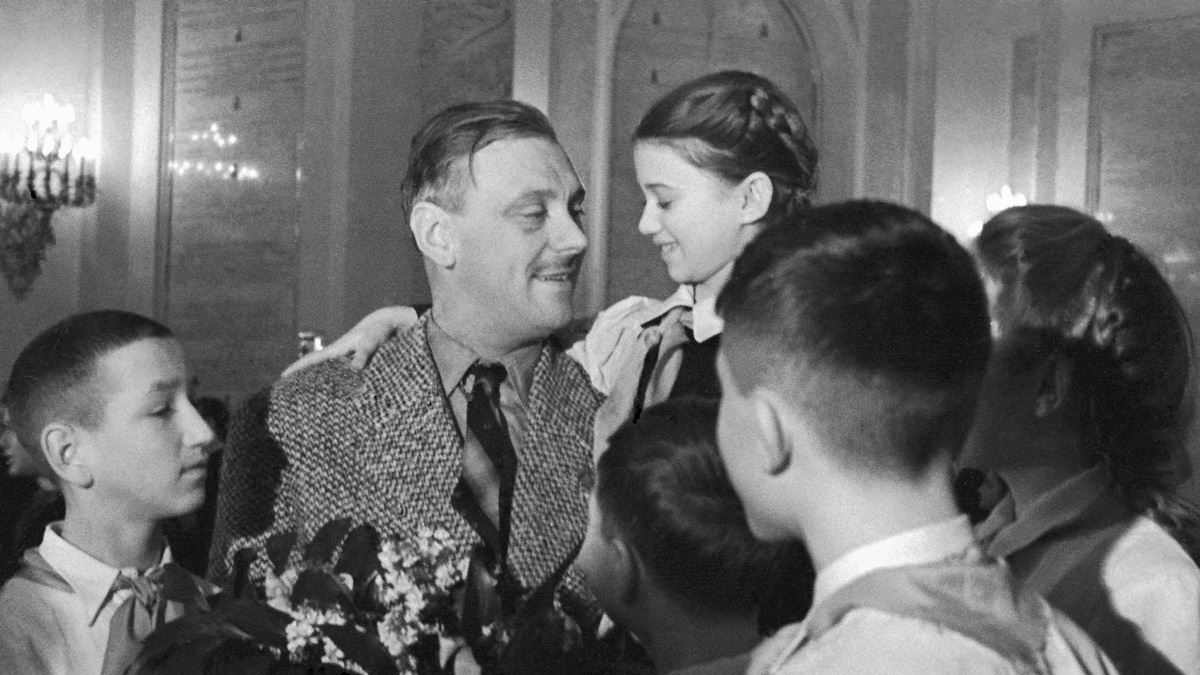
The writer Sergei Mikhalkov in 1954. During this period, Kapustin lived in the Mikhalkov household, which served as a major cultural hub where he was first exposed to American jazz.

Initially, Kapustin lived in a crowded music college dormitory, sharing a single room with six other students. During his college years (1954–1955), however, his close friendship with classmate Andrei Mikhalkov led the impoverished student to move into the home of Andrei's father, the famous Soviet writer Sergei Mikhalkov. The household was a major cultural hub in Moscow. Living there allowed Kapustin to interact with eminent figures such as Aram Khachaturian (who found Kapustin's Czech Rhapsody too harmonically "spicy"), the legendary pianist Vladimir Sofronitsky (to whom Kapustin played his 1954 Sonatina), and, crucially, big band leader Oleg Lundstrem.

It was at the Mikhalkov residence that Kapustin received his foundational jazz education by secretly listening to Voice of America broadcasts late at night—an interest his classical teacher Rubakh supported. A catalyst for this musical awakening was the American broadcaster Willis Conover, whose nightly Jazz Hour program served as a form of covert American "jazz diplomacy" during the Cold War. Kapustin, like an entire generation of Soviet musicians living behind the Iron Curtain, relied almost exclusively on Conover's radio broadcasts to encounter the giants of the US jazz scene. Hearing the music of Louis Armstrong, Glenn Miller, Benny Goodman, and Nat King Cole via the Jazz Hour left a profound mark on him.

Because sheet music for Western jazz was strictly unavailable and ideologically suppressed in the Soviet Union at the time, Kapustin and Andrei recorded the radio broadcasts using a rare magnetic tape recorder. Kapustin painstakingly transcribed the complex improvisations by ear to study their harmonic and rhythmic structures. The discovery of the virtuosic playing of Canadian jazz pianist Oscar Peterson around this time, alongside titans like Erroll Garner and Duke Ellington, deeply influenced Kapustin's musical trajectory, prompting him to dedicate himself to mastering jazz idioms.

=== Moscow Conservatory (1956–1961) ===
==== Admission and Goldenweiser's class ====
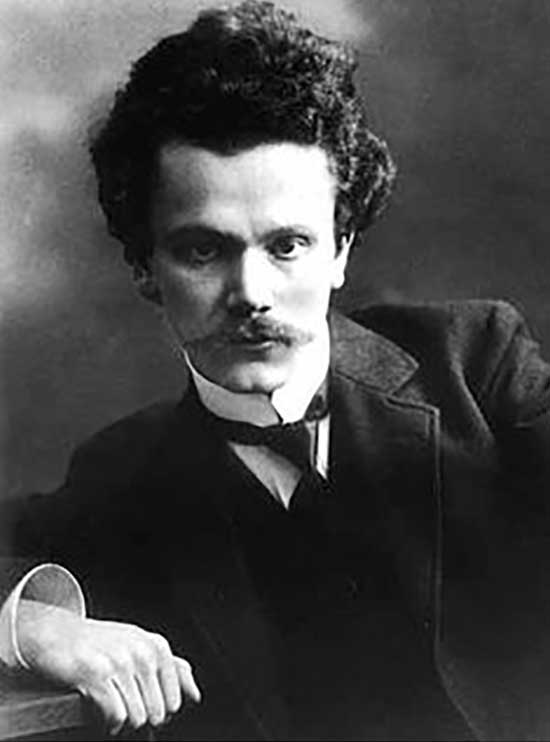
The legendary pianist Aleksandr Goldenweiser, who was 81 years old when Kapustin joined his class. He considered Kapustin to be among the three most talented pianists he had ever known.

In the summer of 1956, Kapustin completed his studies at the Academic Moscow College with highest honors, narrowly avoiding disaster when he overslept on the day of his final piano exam; he ran to the hall and successfully performed Beethoven's Waldstein Sonata and Liszt's Réminiscences de Don Juan. In preparation for his entrance to the Moscow Conservatory, his teacher Avrelian Rubakh arranged a private audition with the legendary pianist and pedagogue Aleksandr Goldenweiser. Kapustin's performance of Liszt's immensely difficult Don Juan prompted Goldenweiser to ask Rubakh, "Where do you find such a pianist?" For the official entrance exams, Kapustin prepared a demanding program that included Prokofiev's Piano Concerto No. 2, works by Bach, and Liszt's Don Juan. Due to the high volume of applicants, the jury requested only the 20-minute Liszt piece. Because of his honors status from the musical college, he was exempt from further exams, though he unknowingly spent the summer studying Soviet history.

Kapustin studied from 1956 with Alexander Goldenweiser at the Moscow Conservatory. Goldenweiser, who was 81 years old when Kapustin joined his class, shared personal memories of Sergei Rachmaninoff and Nikolai Medtner with the young student. The pedagogical style of Goldenweiser contrasted sharply with Rubakh's detail-oriented approach. Goldenweiser focused on the "large picture" and the composer's overarching style, running his classes like public masterclasses, with his wife meticulously recording notes for history. His expectations were extraordinarily high, requiring students to play pieces completely memorized and at the final tempo by the very first lesson. Recognizing Kapustin's advanced abilities, Goldenweiser's assistant, Dmitri Bashkirov, told the young pianist he had nothing to teach him, allowing Kapustin to bypass preparatory lessons and study exclusively with Goldenweiser.

==== Injury, collaborations, and avant-garde explorations ====
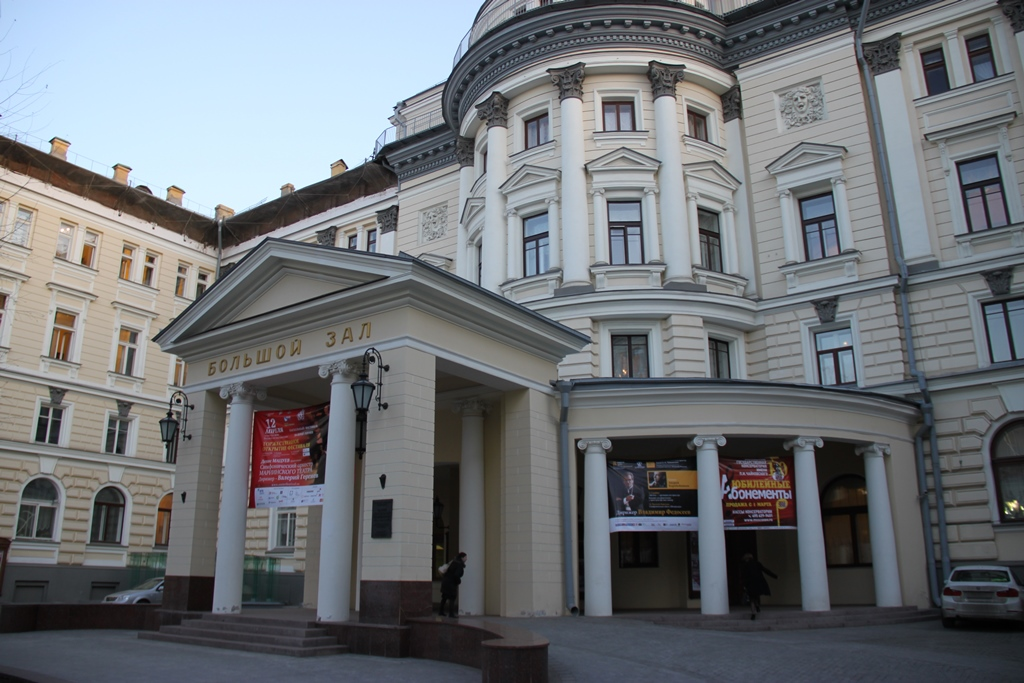
The main entrance of the Moscow Conservatory, where Kapustin performed his first-year jury with only his left hand following a severe finger infection. He famously nearly faced expulsion from the institution for hanging "bourgeois" abstract paintings in his dormitory as a joke.

Kapustin was an active classical performer and accompanist during his conservatory years. In the autumn of 1956, he stepped in at the last minute to accompany the pianist Tatiana Nikolayeva in Prokofiev's Piano Concerto No. 5, sight-reading and learning the score rapidly. He also accompanied the pianist Maria Yudina in Stravinsky's Concerto for Piano and Wind Instruments.

However, early in his conservatory years, Kapustin suffered an injury to his right hand. The day after his performance with Nikolayeva, he developed a severe infection in his third finger that bordered on gangrene, requiring emergency surgery at the Vishnevsky Institute of Surgery. Though he ultimately overcame the setback to continue his rigorous training, he was unable to use his right hand for nearly six months. This forced him to perform Ravel's Piano Concerto for the Left Hand for his first-year jury (played before a committee that included Emil Gilels) and led him to compose his own unpublished Piano Sonata for the Left Hand (1957), which he considered his last composition in a purely traditional classical style.

Despite Goldenweiser's preference for the Viennese and Romantic schools, Kapustin eagerly explored twentieth-century and avant-garde music. After attending Glenn Gould's historic 1957 lecture-recital in Moscow, Kapustin developed a deep interest in dodecaphonic music, memorizing and performing Arnold Schoenberg's Suite for Piano, Op. 25 and studying works by Anton Webern and Alban Berg, despite the Conservatory's strict ban on composing atonal music. He also collaborated with fellow students who would become major figures in contemporary music, such as playing Alfred Schnittke's graduation piece Nagasaki for four hands with Sofia Gubaidulina.

==== The 1957 World Festival and transition to jazz ====
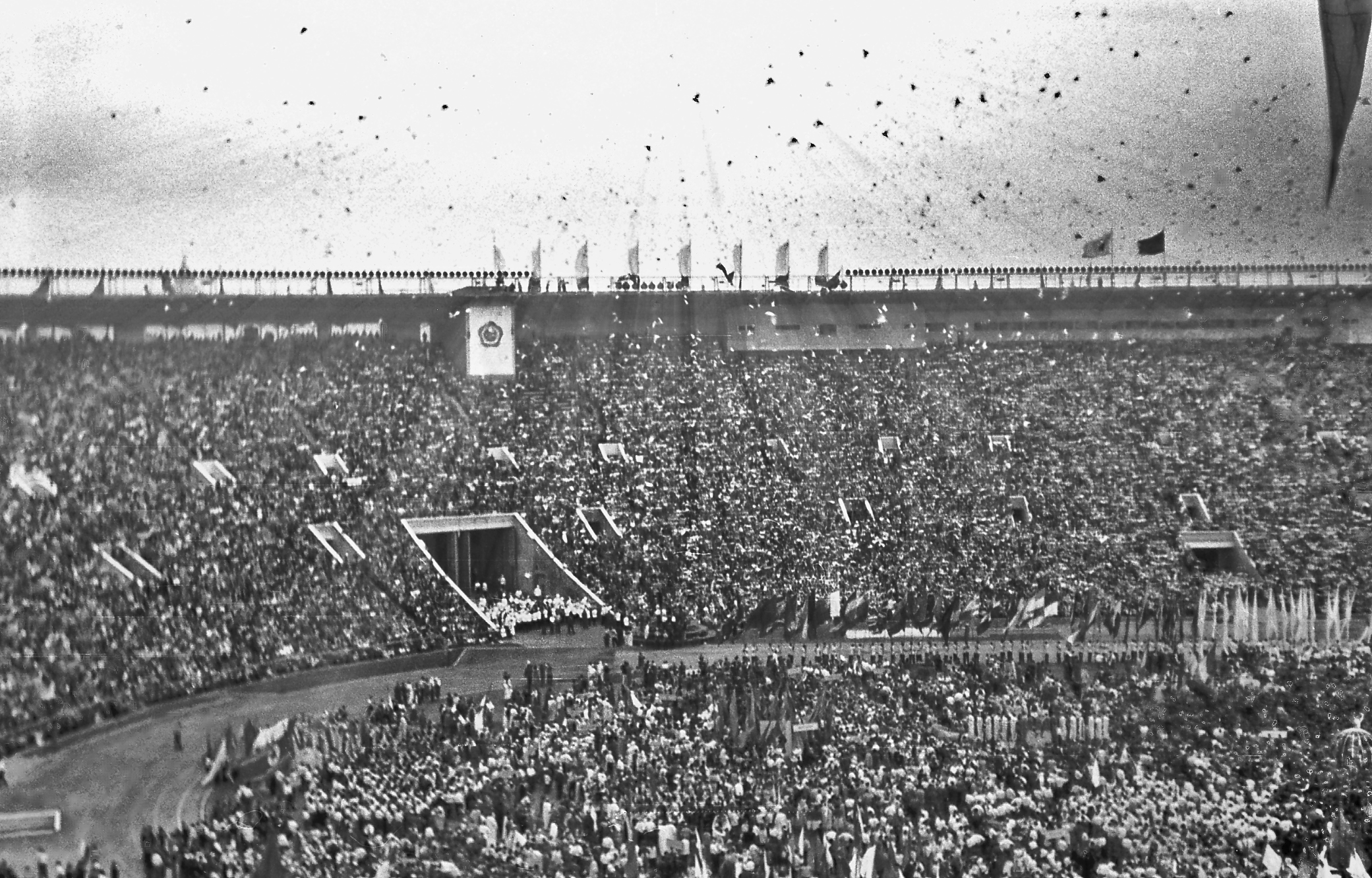
Opening ceremony of the 6th World Festival of Youth and Students at the Lenin Stadium in July 1957. It was at this festival that Kapustin premiered his first opus, the Concertino for Piano and Orchestra, with Yuri Saulsky's big band.

During the 1950s, Kapustin became known as a jazz pianist, arranger, and composer, a formal foray into the jazz idiom that occurred simultaneously with his classical training, largely unbeknownst to Goldenweiser. His first publicly performed piece, the Concertino for Piano and Orchestra, Op. 1, was commissioned for the 6th World Festival of Youth and Students held in Moscow in July 1957. Kapustin premiered the work with Yury Saulsky's big band to great acclaim.

Following the festival, Kapustin formed a jazz quintet with musicians from Saulsky's band, including saxophonist Alexey Zubov. They secured a residency performing at the upscale Hotel "National" restaurant in Moscow. Though Kapustin resigned after a month due to the exhausting schedule and repetitive repertoire, one of these performances caught the attention of visiting Americans. A covert recording of the group playing Kapustin's original twelve-bar blues, The Man from Mars, was smuggled out and subsequently broadcast in the United States on Voice of America in 1958, marking the first time his name reached the US. By 1958–1959, his compositional voice was cementing with the creation of his Piano Sonata in C minor, a three-movement work that heavily integrated jazz harmonies and rhythmic idioms into classical forms.

==== Student life and graduation ====
Konstantin Adzhemov (1911–1985) in a portrait from the Moscow Conservatory archives. He taught the "Chamber Ensemble" course and was a significant influence on Kapustin's classical chamber training.

Kapustin navigated the rigid Soviet educational system by focusing strictly on his musical interests. He excelled in "History of Piano Performance" under Alexander Nikolaev and "Chamber Ensemble" with Konstantin Adzhemov, but admittedly ignored his harmony textbooks and barely passed mandatory political courses like Dialectic Materialism. He nearly faced expulsion during a quarantine period when he and a group of friends hung abstract, "bourgeois" paintings in their dormitory as a joke. He was saved only by the direct intervention of Goldenweiser, who told the Conservatory director that he had known only two people equally talented in his life: Sergei Rachmaninoff and Tatiana Nikolayeva, and the third was Nikolai Kapustin.

Kapustin graduated in 1961, facing a grueling 90-minute final performance exam program that included Stravinsky's Petrushka, Liszt's Sonata in B minor, Beethoven's Sonata No. 22, and Bartók's Piano Concerto No. 2, having previously included Prokofiev's Piano Concerto No. 2 in his college graduation recital. He was awarded an "A" and offered a highly coveted spot in the Conservatory's post-graduate program.

He declined the post-graduate offer, feeling that his formal education had already peaked. Consequently, the state assigned him to work as a piano and accordion instructor in Alma-Ata—a mandatory placement that Kapustin feared would ruin his technique as a musician. To avoid this fate, the managing director of the Oleg Lundstrem Orchestra, Mikhail Tsin, met privately with Goldenweiser. Together, they navigated the bureaucracy, securing Kapustin his diploma and a release from the teaching assignment, allowing him to officially join the Lundstrem Big Band. Goldenweiser retired shortly after the summer of 1961 and passed away that November, making Kapustin one of his final graduates.

== Career ==
=== Oleg Lundstrem Big Band (1961–1972) ===
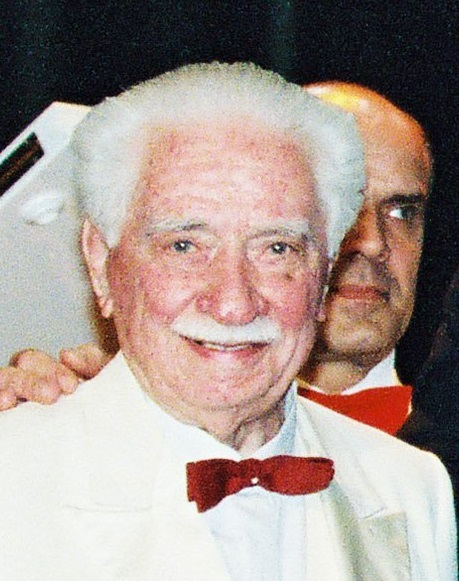
Oleg Lundstrem in 2000. Under Lundstrem's leadership, Kapustin spent eleven years as a soloist and arranger, touring extensively across the Soviet Union.

==== Joining the orchestra and "Second Conservatory" ====
After graduating in 1961, Kapustin joined the Oleg Lundstrem State Chamber Jazz Orchestra, touring throughout the Soviet Union and abroad until 1972. He considered this 11-year period his "Second Conservatory" due to the practical experience he gained in arranging and playing classical jazz in the style of Count Basie. He joined during a transitional period for the ensemble; he replaced Estonian pianist Leo Tauts as the original musicians who had formed the band in 1930s China were gradually being replaced by a younger generation of improvising Moscow musicians, including Kapustin's friends saxophonist Alexei Zoubov and trombonist Konstantin Bakholdin. As the only member of the orchestra with a performance degree from the Moscow Conservatory, Kapustin served as the band's primary pianist and occasionally played the electric organ.

==== Arranger and transcriber ====
Because sheet music for Western big bands was largely unavailable in the Soviet Union, Kapustin was tasked with transcribing the music of the Count Basie, Duke Ellington, and Glenn Miller orchestras by ear from radio broadcasts and rare vinyl records. This grueling work was complicated by a childhood quirk: because his piano in Nikitovka had been permanently tuned a half-step down to protect its old strings, his absolute pitch was skewed, causing him to permanently hear all pitches a half-step lower than they were played. He also arranged popular Russian and Soviet songs for the band to supplement his income, though he personally disliked the genre and preferred serious instrumental jazz. Outside of Lundstrem's band, he notably arranged the classical operetta Rose-Marie for the Leonid Utyosov Big Band in 1963.

==== Original compositions for the big band ====
Kapustin composed his Piano Concerto No. 1, Op. 2 (1961) specifically for the band, intending it to be a serious, large-scale work for piano and jazz orchestra. However, its length and complexity meant it was rarely performed, as the band's repertoire leaned heavily toward lighter entertainment. Adjusting to these demands, he wrote the shorter and highly successful Variations for Piano and Big Band, Op. 3 (1962).

Another notable work from this era was his Toccata, Op. 8 (1964), a technically demanding piece featuring complex written-out swing rhythms. The Toccata became a staple of their live performances, and a shortened version was featured in the Soviet film When the Song Does Not End (1964). Kapustin's playing and original compositions were also featured on two vinyl LPs recorded by the orchestra for the state label Melodiya in 1966 and 1970.

==== Touring and Western jazz encounters ====
The band maintained a punishing tour schedule, frequently performing two or three concerts a day for a month at a time across the USSR and the Eastern Bloc. Due to Soviet ideological hostility toward jazz, the ensemble was officially billed as a "Concert Popular Big Band," and up to 90% of their live repertoire consisted of popular vocal music rather than pure jazz, much to Kapustin's frustration. Despite this, they experienced immense success abroad, performing at major venues like Prague's Lucerna in 1965 and the Tallinn Jazz Festival in 1967, where Kapustin first witnessed a live performance by a young Keith Jarrett playing with the Charles Lloyd Quartet.

During his tenure, Kapustin had surreal encounters with visiting American jazz legends. When Benny Goodman toured the USSR in 1962, a Soviet film crew making a documentary failed to capture enough musical footage of Goodman's pianist, Teddy Wilson. Kapustin was hired to learn and record Wilson's piano improvisations, and the film crew painted Kapustin's hands a darker color to physically double for Wilson on screen. Later, in 1971, Kapustin attended a private meeting and jam session with Duke Ellington at the Moscow Composer House.

The grueling life of a touring musician eventually took its toll. Though the tours led him to meet his future wife, Alla Semenovna Baranovskaya (1945–2020), in Novokuznetsk in 1967, Kapustin grew increasingly exhausted by the travel and bored by the band's commercial vocal repertoire. Seeking a more stable life to focus on his compositions, he left the Lundstrem Orchestra in 1972.

=== Cinema and radio orchestras (1972–1984) ===
Boris Karamyshev (1915–2005), the conductor of the "Blue Screen" (Goluboy Ekran) Orchestra. Kapustin joined this ensemble in 1972, marking a transition from his touring years to a period focused on studio performance and large-scale symphonic composition.

==== Boris Karamyshev "Blue Screen" Orchestra ====
Seeking a lifestyle with less grueling touring after marrying Alla in 1969 and the birth of their first son, Anton Kapustin, in 1971, Kapustin resigned from the Lundstrem Big Band. (Anton later became a theoretical physicist noted for his work in string theory at the Caltech. The couple also had a second son, Pavel, born in 1978, who became an economist.) After a brief period of unemployment, a saxophonist friend helped him secure a position as a pianist in the Boris Karamyshev "Blue Screen" Orchestra in the spring of 1972.

Karamyshev's ensemble was the official orchestra of the Soviet All-Union Central Radio and Television. It served as the accompanying band for major national broadcasts, including the iconic New Year’s Eve television program Goluboi Ogonyok ("Little Blue Light"), where Kapustin's playing was frequently broadcast into millions of Soviet homes. While the band still occasionally toured—such as a 1973 Soviet tour backing British pop singer Robert Young—the schedule was much more settled than his time with Lundstrem.

Crucially, unlike Lundstrem's band, Karamyshev's sympho-jazz ensemble included a nine-piece string section. This allowed Kapustin to significantly expand his orchestrational palette, leading to a spike in his compositional output. During his five years with the orchestra, he composed twelve major works specifically for them, including the highly successful Nocturne for Piano and Orchestra, Op. 20 (1974), and the Concerto for Piano and Orchestra No. 2, Op. 14 (1974), which he successfully premiered with the ensemble.

==== Varlamov and arrangement work ====
Alexander Varlamov (1904–1990). Kapustin was hired in the late 1970s to modernize Varlamov's older swing compositions, re-orchestrating them with sophisticated jazz harmonies for the 1980 Melodiya release Compositions in Dance Rhythms.

To supplement his income during this period, Kapustin extensively arranged popular Soviet songs and classical themes, though he still harbored a distaste for light entertainment music. Through Karamyshev, Kapustin met and befriended the aging Alexander Varlamov, one of the foundational figures of Soviet jazz. Because Varlamov was suffering from failing eyesight and felt his own 1930s-style compositions sounded too old-fashioned, he hired Kapustin to modernize and orchestrate his themes. Kapustin frequently re-harmonized Varlamov's simple, triadic melodies with complex, modern jazz chord progressions. Many of these Kapustin-arranged tracks, featuring his own brilliant piano improvisations, were recorded by the Karamyshev Orchestra and released on the 1980 Melodiya LP Compositions in Dance Rhythms.

==== State Symphonic Orchestra of Cinematography ====
In the spring of 1977, the Karamyshev Orchestra was unexpectedly dissolved by state authorities, leaving the musicians abruptly unemployed. Kapustin immediately auditioned for the prestigious Russian State Symphony Orchestra of Cinematography. Bypassing jazz standards, he secured the highly competitive position by playing complex, modern classical repertoire from memory: Hindemith's Ludus Tonalis and Bartók's Suite, Op. 14.

Working under conductors such as Georgy Garanian, Yuri Serebryakov, and Konstantin Krimetz, Kapustin spent the next seven years recording film scores for the legendary Mosfilm studios. The job was incredibly lucrative but brutally intense. The orchestra was massive (over 200 musicians and seven pianists), requiring Kapustin to participate in up to three different three-hour recording sessions a day.

The position demanded elite sight-reading skills, as musicians were frequently required to record highly complex music in a single take with zero rehearsal time. Despite the punishing schedule, Kapustin continued to compose, completing eight orchestral works during this period, including his Op. 34 and Op. 35, which were premiered by the Yuri Silantiev Orchestra.

==== Formal recognition and a pivotal accident ====
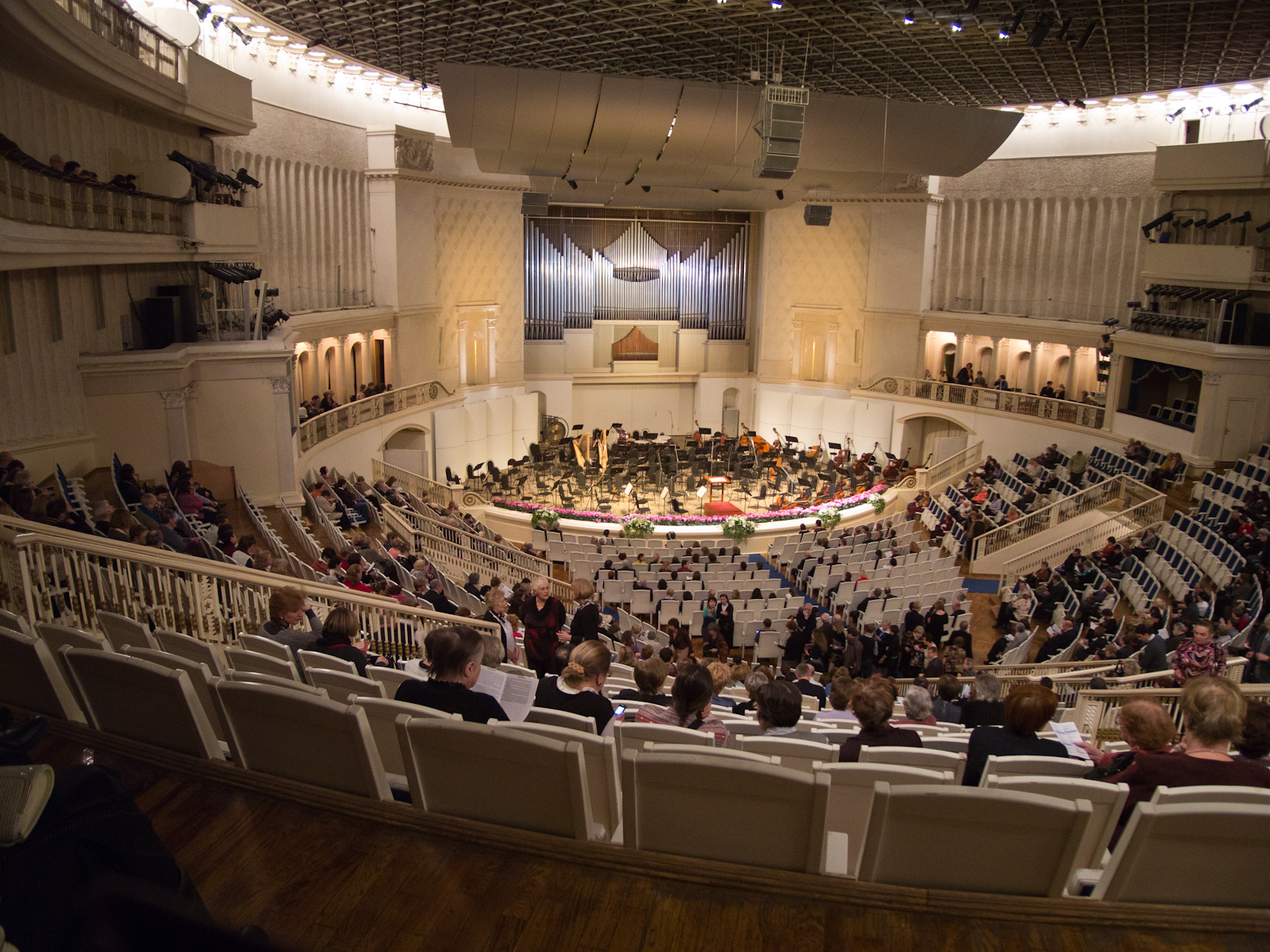
The Tchaikovsky Concert Hall in Moscow, a frequent venue for the Oleg Lundstrem Orchestra. Kapustin premiered his Piano Concerto No. 2, Op. 14, here in 1974.

In the summer of 1979, Kapustin was walking in Moscow with his young son Anton when they were struck by a speeding car driven by a KGB agent. Kapustin managed to push his son out of the way, saving the boy's life, but suffered a double fracture in his right hand. Doctors told Kapustin he would likely never play the piano again and recommended surgery to immobilize the hand. Defying medical advice, Kapustin refused the surgery and painstakingly rehabilitated his hand by practicing the piano through the pain while still wearing a cast.

He fully recovered in time to perform the highly anticipated 1980 premiere of his Piano Concerto No. 2 at the Tchaikovsky Concert Hall. This triumph marked two major turning points: it was his final public performance as a solo classical pianist, as he decided thereafter to focus exclusively on studio recording, and it led to his official acceptance into the Union of Soviet Composers, which equated to formal state recognition of his work.

Kapustin noted that he faced no censorship from Soviet authorities; his music was not considered avant-garde, and the state's Ministry of Culture regularly purchased his scores for performance and publication, providing a vital source of income.

=== Full-time composition and freelance years (1984–1999) ===
==== Resignation and state commissions ====
Following a 1980 performance of his Piano Concerto No. 2 at the Tchaikovsky Concert Hall, Kapustin largely withdrew from public performance. In interviews, he expressed a profound discomfort with playing in front of live audiences, revealing that stage fright and the pressures of concertizing drained him. By 1984, he resigned from the Orchestra of Cinematography to become a full-time, freelance composer. Leaving a prestigious, salaried orchestra position just before the economic upheavals of perestroika was a bold and risky move for a Soviet family man. However, Kapustin sustained his family through state commissions; the USSR Ministry of Culture regularly purchased his major new scores—such as his Sinfonietta, Op. 49 and the Alto Saxophone Concerto, Op. 50—for state archives, which provided a lucrative income and validated his decision to freelance.

Operating as a freelance composer ushered in an era of heightened productivity. He spent his summers composing at his beloved dacha in Ruza, away from the noise of the city. While Kapustin composed 25 works during the 1980s, his output nearly doubled in the 1990s, yielding 43 new compositions.

==== Shift to solo piano and the Melodiya recordings ====
His first officially published piece was the "Toccatina", Op. 36, printed by a Moscow publisher in 1983. The 1980s marked a shift toward solo piano works, and he began his cycle of piano sonatas in 1984. That same year, he composed his famous Eight Concert Études, Op. 40, and the Variations, Op. 41. In 1988, he completed his Twenty-Four Preludes in Jazz Style, Op. 53, mapping his jazz idioms onto the same circle-of-fifths tonal plan used by Frédéric Chopin in his Op. 28 preludes.

To champion his new solo works, Kapustin embarked on a massive project to record his own music as the definitive interpreter. Between 1985 and 1989, he recorded three vinyl LPs for the state label Melodiya: Nikolai Kapustin (featuring his First Sonata and Op. 40 Études), Jazz Pieces for Piano, and Twenty-Four Preludes in Jazz Style. He was in the process of recording a fourth LP of his piano sonatas when the collapse of the Soviet Union in 1991 bankrupted the state label, prompting Kapustin to transition his subsequent recordings to the CD format, beginning with his 1992 release Jazz Portrait.

==== Return to the stage and new collaborations ====
After a fifteen-year hiatus from live performance, Kapustin was coaxed back onto the stage in December 1995 to premiere his newly composed Piece for Sextet, Op. 79, at the Bolshoi Theatre. This marked the beginning of a highly active period of chamber music performance and collaboration with elite Russian classical musicians who eagerly championed his work.

He reconnected with the renowned classical pianist Nikolai Petrov, a former conservatory acquaintance, who became a major advocate for Kapustin's music in Russia. Petrov performed the highly successful Russian premieres of Kapustin's Piano Sonata No. 2 in 1991 and his Piano Concerto No. 5 (which Kapustin dedicated to Petrov) in 1995 at the Moscow Conservatory. At the 1995 concerto premiere, Kapustin met cellist Alexander Zagorinsky, sparking a close friendship and a prolific collaborative partnership. Inspired by Zagorinsky, Kapustin composed his two Cello Sonatas (Op. 63 and Op. 84), which the duo frequently performed together, alongside other major chamber works like the Flute Trio, Op. 86, premiered with the eminent flutist Alexander Korneev in 1999.

=== Monumental works and European tours ===
In the summer of 1997, Kapustin composed what he considered one of his most significant achievements: the Twenty-Four Preludes and Fugues, Op. 82. Written over a single summer while he was alone, the monumental 80-minute polyphonic cycle subjected complex jazz syncopations to strict Baroque contrapuntal rules. Kapustin later recorded the entire exhausting 48-piece cycle himself over four days in a Moscow studio in 2000.

During this period, he also began embarking on rare travels outside of Russia, undertaking two notable musical tours to Germany alongside his frequent collaborator, cellist Alexander Zagorinsky. Organized by their friend, the Russian-born pianist Natasha Konsistorum, the first tour commenced in late October 1998. Kapustin, who enjoyed observing people and preferred ground travel over flying, took a two-day train journey across Belarus, Ukraine, and Poland to reach Hannover.

Their debut German performance took place in Hannover on November 1, 1998. To minimize rehearsal time, the duo repeated the repertoire from Kapustin's recent Moscow Jubilee concert, which included his Cello Sonatas No. 1 (Op. 63) and No. 2 (Op. 84), as well as classical chamber works including Beethoven's Seven Variations on a Theme from the Magic Flute and Chopin's Polonaise Brilliante, Op. 3. This concert was recorded and later released on CD in 2008; it remains a unique entry in Kapustin's discography as a rare live recording of him playing standard classical repertoire. The Hannover concert also featured a notable instance of Kapustin's spontaneous humor: when the audience fervently demanded an unprepared second encore, Kapustin decided to play his solo piano piece Day-Break, Op. 26. Giving Zagorinsky only a brief verbal instruction backstage, Kapustin walked out and forced the classically trained cellist to improvise a jazz part live on stage.

Following the success of their debut, Kapustin and Zagorinsky were quickly invited back for a second German tour in July 1999. This time, Kapustin was accompanied by his wife, Alla, and the couple used the opportunity to visit their son Anton, who was attending a mathematics conference in Potsdam. For the performances, Kapustin focused strictly on his own cello sonatas, while Konsistorum joined Zagorinsky to play Brahms. A unique feature of this tour was Alla's participation on stage as Kapustin's page-turner. Despite having no musical training and being unable to read sheet music, she successfully turned the pages by relying entirely on subtle nods from Kapustin. The composer, who knew the complex scores entirely from memory, preferred orchestrating this minor stage deception over having an unknown stranger sit next to him at the piano.

=== International recognition and late career (2000–2020) ===
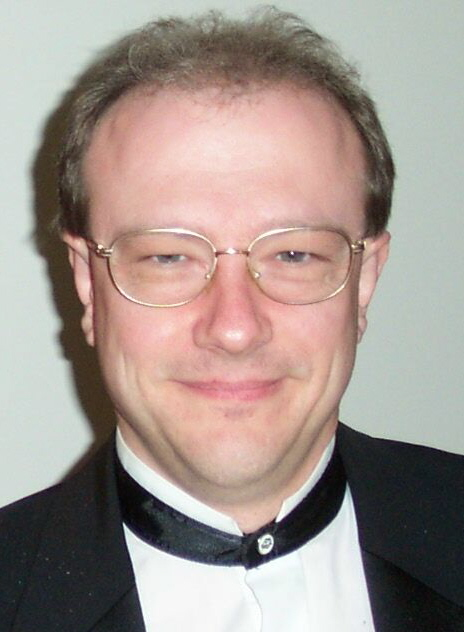
Marc-André Hamelin in 2005. Hamelin's 2004 recording of Kapustin's works for Hyperion Records is widely credited with introducing the composer to a global audience and sparking an international surge in interest and performances.

==== Western premieres and the "Kapustin Piano Society" ====
The early 2000s marked a dramatic turning point in Kapustin's career as his music, previously confined to a niche audience in Russia, exploded onto the international scene. A significant catalyst was the Scottish pianist Steven Osborne, who discovered Kapustin's music through a recording by Nikolai Petrov. In 2000, Osborne released the highly influential album Nikolai Kapustin Piano Music on the British label Hyperion Records, introducing Kapustin's unique fusion of jazz and classical forms to a global audience.

Simultaneously, the renowned Canadian virtuoso Marc-André Hamelin discovered Kapustin's Piano Sonata No. 2 and was immediately captivated. Hamelin's advocacy culminated in his Western premiere of the sonata at Blackheath Concert Hall in London on May 14, 2000. Kapustin, who possessed a deep fear of flying, undertook a grueling three-day train journey across Europe with his wife, Alla, to attend the performance.

The London trip was orchestrated and hosted by Jan Hoare, a dedicated British admirer and the secretary of the British Liszt Society. Recognizing the difficulties Kapustin faced navigating Western publishing, distribution, and copyright law from post-Soviet Russia, Hoare became a vital champion of his music in the West. She established the "Kapustin Society" in London—an organization specifically dedicated to promoting his work, organizing his disparate manuscripts, and officially securing his international royalties.

Kapustin and his wife stayed at Hoare's home in the London suburb of Twickenham during their visit. Deeply moved by her hospitality and tireless advocacy on his behalf, Kapustin composed his Piano Sonata No. 11, Op. 101 ("Twickenham") later that year. The published score bears the official printed dedication "To Jan Hoare. Twickenham," standing as a permanent token of his gratitude.

Following the London premiere, Hamelin inscribed his score of Kapustin's Suite in the Old Style, to which the composer added: "To dear Marc-André Hamelin from the grateful author of the Sonata No. 2, that nobody will ever perform better." Hamelin later recorded his own dedicated album of Kapustin's works for Hyperion in 2004.

==== The final CD recordings ====
Riding this wave of international interest, Kapustin continued his prolific project of recording his own music, now partnering with the Japanese label Triton (and later Octavia Records). In September 2000, shortly after returning from London, he undertook the monumental task of recording his complete Twenty-Four Preludes and Fugues, Op. 82. He recorded the entire 80-minute, 48-piece cycle from memory over just four consecutive days in a Moscow studio.

He released several more CDs in the early 2000s, including Kapustin Plays Kapustin (2002), which featured chamber works alongside solo piano pieces. In 2004, he released what he intended to be his final album as a performer, aptly titled Nikolai Kapustin: Last Recording. Kapustin believed his performing days were over, noting that he had stopped practicing as younger virtuosos were now championing his music. However, he returned to the studio one final time five years later. In 2008, he released Kapustin Returns!, a CD containing twelve works, concluding with his Piano Sonata No. 16, Op. 131.

==== Expanding repertoire and new collaborations ====
Despite slowing down his public performances, Kapustin remained highly active as a composer throughout the 2000s and 2010s. His output shifted slightly from the large-scale orchestral works of his past to focus heavily on solo piano and chamber music. During this era, he completed the final ten of his twenty piano sonatas (spanning from No. 11, Op. 101 in 2000 to No. 20, Op. 144 in 2011). He also explored unusual instrumentation, writing concertos that combined the orchestra with two pianos and percussion (Op. 104) and violin and piano (Op. 105).

His growing popularity in Asia led to fruitful new relationships, notably with the Japanese pianist Masahiro Kawakami, who visited Kapustin in Moscow in 2003. Kawakami became a vital advocate, organizing the Japan Kapustin Society, founding a Kapustin Festival in Tokyo, and embarking on a massive project to record the composer's complete piano works. Similarly, the Bulgarian-Spanish pianist Ludmil Angelov became a close correspondent and champion, premiering Kapustin's Piano Sonata No. 14, Op. 120, in Toledo, Spain in 2006.

==== Late life ====
As Kapustin entered his late seventies and eighties, he faced personal losses, including the death of his beloved sister Fira in December 2007, just a day before his 70th birthday tribute concert at Gnessin State Musical College in Moscow. Despite these hardships, his daily routine in Moscow remained highly disciplined, beginning at 6:00 AM with composition, followed by a strict schedule of meals, reading (often complex books on physics and linguistics), and resting.

By the 2010s, Kapustin's music had become a staple at major international piano competitions, including the Van Cliburn and Tchaikovsky competitions, cementing his status as a modern master. Major publishing houses, notably the German company Schott Music, began publishing his extensive catalog of solo and chamber works in 2014. His 80th birthday in 2017 was celebrated globally with dedicated tribute concerts in Moscow, Tokyo, and Bari, Italy. His final completed piano work, Moon Rainbow, Op. 161, stands as a testament to a composer who synthesized the rhythmic vitality of jazz with the structural rigor of the classical tradition.

=== Death and burial ===
Kapustin died at his apartment in northwest Moscow on 2 July 2020 at the age of 82. The cause of death was recorded as COVID-19-related pneumonia.

The period was marked by a double tragedy for the family; Kapustin's wife of over fifty years, Alla, died almost simultaneously after being hospitalized with a confirmed case of COVID-19. News of the composer's death was not widely reported until a week later, following confirmation from family and medical sources. Kapustin was buried at the Vostryakovo Cemetery in Moscow.

== Character and personality ==
Kapustin was famous among those who knew him for his intense privacy, modesty, and disinterest in fame. A heavy smoker rarely seen without a cigarette, he preferred the solitude of his Moscow apartment and his compositional routines over the busy life of a touring virtuoso.

As his international popularity skyrocketed in the 21st century, Kapustin politely but firmly declined countless invitations to perform abroad, give masterclasses, or participate in promotional tours. He viewed himself solely as a composer who played the piano out of necessity to record his own works. This aversion to the public eye was so deep that he did not even attend the major tribute concerts organized in Russia for his 80th birthday, telling biographers, "Those concerts dedicated to my music will go equally well with me or without me. So, there is no need for me to be there."

=== Uncompromising artistic integrity ===
Kapustin approached his art with a blue-collar pragmatism, completely unconcerned with financial gain but fiercely protective of his music. In 2013, he composed two highly complex pieces (Nobody is Perfect, Op. 151 and A Pianist in Jeopardy, Op. 152) specifically for a piano competition in the Republic of San Marino, submitting both so the jury could choose. The organizers rejected him, stating they had already selected a piece by Chick Corea and could not afford to pay a second composer. Kapustin was furious, completely unconcerned with the financial slight: "I didn't want any payment, all I wanted was my music to be performed!"

He was equally blunt regarding the reception of his own work. When informed that his relatively easy Sonatina, Op. 100 was immensely popular among amateur pianists, he curtly replied, "They should not do it; it is not the best piece that I wrote." Furthermore, he harbored a deep annoyance for music critics constantly labeling him the "Russian Gershwin," stating flatly, "I am already tired of it... It's not a pleasant thing."

=== Dry humor and living "dangerously" ===
While notoriously difficult for journalists to approach, Kapustin revealed a dry, sarcastic sense of humor and a penchant for mild mischief to those he trusted. During an April 1999 concert, Kapustin was scheduled to premiere his Flute Trio, Op. 86 in the second half of the program. During the 15-minute intermission, a complete stranger approached him and asked to borrow the score to copy it. Incredibly, Kapustin handed over the only existing manuscript of the un-premiered piece. When his biographer later expressed shock at the risk, Kapustin smiled and replied, "You don't like to live your life dangerously? ... there is some excitement in that." (The stranger returned it perfectly on time).

He enjoyed putting his classical colleagues in similarly unpredictable situations. During his 1998 tour of Germany with the classically trained cellist Alexander Zagorinsky, the audience fervently demanded a second, completely unplanned encore. Backstage, Kapustin decided they would play Day-Break, Op. 26—which is actually a solo piano piece. Giving Zagorinsky only a brief verbal explanation of what he had in mind and making zero markings in the score, Kapustin walked out and forced the cellist to improvise live on stage. "He didn't have a choice," Kapustin joked, proud he had turned his friend into a jazz musician on the spot.

=== Intellectual quirks and disdain for pretense ===
Beyond his musical genius, Kapustin possessed a fierce, idiosyncratic intellect. He read advanced texts on physics and linguistics for leisure, delving into the works of James Clerk Maxwell and modern theoretical physicists. He was also a passionate polyglot, but with a highly specific quirk: he learned languages solely to read their literature and largely ignored conversational pronunciation. He taught himself Japanese and Arabic from textbooks, but his inability to speak the languages he could read often led to comical misunderstandings. When the Scottish pianist Steven Osborne attempted to call Kapustin in the late 1990s, the call was quickly aborted because Kapustin could not understand Osborne's spoken English, and Osborne's attempts at Russian were equally incomprehensible.

Kapustin had zero tolerance for pretense. He once agreed to an interview with a German journalist who claimed to speak fluent Russian. Upon arriving, the journalist only knew a couple of phrases. Kapustin refused to accommodate him, and the two men sat in complete silence for a prolonged period, resulting in a disastrous interview that made Kapustin deeply suspicious of future journalists.

His cynicism extended to political pretense as well. He actively avoided Soviet musical politics, finding the Union of Soviet Composers' meetings to be "just talking and nothing else." When Russian President Boris Yeltsin was televised riding a public trolleybus to appear "close to the people," Kapustin instantly saw through the propaganda stunt, noting that "politics was the dark territory" and losing all respect for the performative administration.

=== Exactitude and domestic life ===
His obsessive exactitude extended to his domestic life. He loathed having his regimented daily routine altered by visitors, frequently complaining to his wife Alla when interviews "ruined our day."

A humorous snapshot of his demanding exactness occurred at his summer dacha in Ruza. While sitting on the porch, both the aging Kapustin and his six-year-old grandson Maxim simultaneously began complaining to Alla about their tea for entirely opposite reasons: Maxim demanded she blow on his because it was too hot, while Kapustin demanded she reheat his because it was too cold—leaving his wife to find the perfectly comfortable compromise for both of them.

== Musical style ==
=== Synthesis of jazz and classical idioms ===
Kapustin's musical style is uniquely noted for flawlessly blending the rhythmic and harmonic language of jazz with traditional Western classical structures. He took a jazz approach to harmony—utilizing complex extended voicings, syncopations, and walking bass lines—and fitted it strictly into academic forms like sonatas, preludes, and fugues. His approach involves populating classical frameworks with jazz syntax, creating a seamless structural integration rather than a mere juxtaposition of styles. For example, within the strictures of sonata form, a traditional exposition in a Kapustin sonata might introduce a fast-paced bebop melody as the primary theme, followed by a lyrical, slow jazz ballad as the contrasting secondary theme. Furthermore, in works like his 24 Preludes and Fugues, Op. 82, Kapustin subjects jazz motifs to rigorous contrapuntal devices such as stretto, inversion, and augmentation, proving that the rhythmic vitality of jazz can withstand the strictest classical polyphony.

Following in the tradition of Russian pianist-composers like Nikolai Medtner and Sergei Rachmaninoff, the piano remained the lynchpin of Kapustin's output. Concurrently, his rigorous classical background shines through his affinity for the classical styles of Alexander Scriabin, Rachmaninoff, Frédéric Chopin, Maurice Ravel, and Béla Bartók. Kapustin's piano writing frequently demands a level of classical virtuosity comparable to the transcendental études of Franz Liszt or the concerti of Rachmaninoff, but applied entirely to a modern jazz vernacular.

=== Harmonic and rhythmic innovations ===
His jazz influences are heavily rooted in the American traditions. Scholars have frequently identified the virtuosic languages of Art Tatum, Oscar Peterson, Bill Evans, Erroll Garner, and Herbie Hancock as foundational to Kapustin's piano writing. Kapustin's works emulate specific historical jazz styles, ranging from stride piano and boogie-woogie to bebop, cool jazz, and jazz fusion, translating the spontaneity of these genres into a rigorously composed framework. He expanded upon traditional jazz pianism by developing what scholars have termed "symphonic stride," where the characteristic left-hand leaps of stride piano are stretched and embellished to cover the entire expanse of the keyboard, creating an orchestral depth of sound.

Harmonically, he heavily employed quartal voicings, altered dominants, 11th and 13th chords, and blue notes. He frequently utilized the "locked-hands" (block chord) technique popularized by George Shearing and Milt Buckner to emulate the thick, homophonic texture of a big band horn section on the piano. Rhythmically, his language relies on idiomatic jazz syncopation, off-beat accentuation, and intricate cross-rhythms. To effectively mimic a jazz rhythm section, Kapustin frequently assigns a relentless, harmonically complex walking bass line to the pianist's left hand while the right hand executes rapid-fire bebop runs, requiring supreme hand independence and rhythmic drive.

=== The paradox of written-out improvisation ===
Despite his works sounding exactly like spontaneous jazz improvisations, the most striking paradox of Kapustin's music is his complete rejection of actual improvisation. Every single note, articulation, dynamic, and swung rhythm is meticulously written out. He stated: "I was never a jazz musician. I never tried to be a real jazz pianist, but I had to do it because of the composing. I'm not interested in improvisation – and what is a jazz musician without improvisation? All my improvisations are written, of course, and they became much better; it improved them."

Kapustin's approach to notation was exceptionally precise. Recognizing that classically trained musicians often lack an intuitive grasp of jazz phrasing, he meticulously documented every articulation, accent, dynamic shift, and pedal mark needed to simulate authentic jazz performance practice. He explicitly indicated when eighth notes should be swung, or deliberately wrote out the swing rhythms using precise triplets or dotted notation to leave nothing to chance.

By deconstructing the elements that make jazz sound improvised—such as idiomatic rhythmic displacement, blues scales, and ghost notes—and codifying them into traditional notation, Kapustin essentially "froze" the ephemeral nature of jazz improvisation onto the page. Consequently, Kapustin's scores serve a unique pedagogical and artistic function: they provide classically trained musicians without any background in jazz improvisation a gateway to master the kinetic energy, harmonic richness, and stylistic nuances of jazz.

== Compositions ==
=== Piano sonatas ===
Kapustin maintained a strong devotion to standard academic forms (the Formenlehre), using them as a scaffolding for his jazz vocabulary. A significant portion of Kapustin's compositional output comprises his 20 piano sonatas, composed between 1984 and 2011. These sonatas stand as a monumental contribution to modern piano literature. They strictly adhere to classical formal frameworks, featuring traditional expositions, developments, and recapitulations, but the thematic material itself is steeped in jazz syntax. Scholars note that Kapustin successfully mapped classical theme types—such as the sentence and the period—onto standard jazz chord progressions and rhythmic grooves.

His sonatas vary greatly in formal organization. They range from extensive single-movement works like the Piano Sonata No. 3, Op. 55 (1990)—which encapsulates nearly every aspect of Kapustin's compositional style in one continuous arc—to complex multi-movement structures such as the highly orthodox Piano Sonata No. 2, Op. 54 (1989), and the Piano Sonata No. 6, Op. 62 (1991). Their intricate jazz voicings, demanding leaps, and relentless rhythmic drive have cemented them as highly challenging staples of the modern virtuosic piano repertoire.

=== Preludes ===
The prelude form offered Kapustin an ideal canvas for exploring concise, highly characterful jazz idioms. His most celebrated work in this genre is the 24 Preludes in Jazz Style, Op. 53 (1988). Following the structural tradition of Chopin's Préludes, Op. 28, Kapustin's cycle traverses all 24 major and minor keys. However, rather than expressing romantic longing, each prelude systematically explores a different facet of the jazz vernacular, ranging from driving boogie-woogie and relentless bebop to lyrical jazz ballads and slow blues. Through this deconstruction of classical patterns, Kapustin heavily infuses the miniature form with idiomatic rhythmic displacement, walking basslines, and rich extended jazz harmonies. He later returned to the form with a more accessible set, the Six Little Preludes, Op. 133 (2007).

=== Fugues ===
Perhaps the most ambitious synthesis of Kapustin's dual musical identity is his monumental 24 Preludes and Fugues, Op. 82 (1997) . This sprawling cycle represents one of the most significant contributions to the genre since J.S. Bach's The Well-Tempered Clavier and Dmitri Shostakovich's 24 Preludes and Fugues, Op. 87. In his fugues, Kapustin conclusively proves that the highly syncopated, swung rhythms of modern jazz can withstand the strictest laws of classical counterpoint. He frequently employs rigorous polyphonic devices, subjecting jazz motifs to canon, stretto, inversion, and augmentation in complex three- and four-voice fugal writing. A unique structural hallmark of Op. 82 is Kapustin's ingenious thematic integration, where each prelude and its corresponding fugue inherently share their core motivic material.

=== Études ===
The concert étude became one of Kapustin's most globally recognized forms, largely due to the Eight Concert Études, Op. 40 (1984) . This cycle fuses the didactic, problem-solving virtuosity of 19th-century classical études—reminiscent of Chopin or Liszt—with demanding modern jazz techniques. The études are securely established in the standard competition repertoire, with pieces like the "Toccatina" (No. 3) famous for its relentless, jazz-inflected repeated notes, and "Reverie" (No. 2) exploring impressionistic jazz harmonies. Kapustin continued this pedagogical and virtuosic exploration in his Five Études in Different Intervals, Op. 68 (1992). In this later cycle, Kapustin isolates specific interval structures—such as minor seconds, fourths, and fifths—and weaves them into complex, modern jazz harmonic languages, showcasing his ability to turn abstract technical exercises into profound artistic statements.

=== Concertos and chamber music ===
While the solo piano was the primary vehicle for his composition, his six piano concertos represent different structural approaches; for instance, Concertos No. 3, 4, and 5 are cast in continuous single movements and are scored for piano and string orchestra. His Piano Concerto No. 2, Op. 14, is historically significant, as its successful premiere led to his formal acceptance into the Union of Soviet Composers. He uniquely treated the big band ensemble as a vehicle worthy of serious classical composition.

From the late 1990s onward, Kapustin expanded his fusion style into established non-piano forms, composing a Cello Concerto (1997), a String Quartet (1998), a Flute Sonata, and a Violin Concerto (2009). These chamber works often demand that traditionally trained classical string and wind players execute authentic jazz phrasing without the aid of a rhythm section. He also paid homage to foundational jazz musicians by writing virtuosic concert paraphrases on famous jazz standards, including a Paraphrase on Dizzy Gillespie's "Manteca" for two pianos, as well as works based on "Sweet Georgia Brown" and Ary Barroso's "Aquarela do Brasil".

=== Suites and other forms ===
Beyond sonatas and preludes, Kapustin extensively explored other historical models. Among his notable works are the Suite in the Old Style, Op. 28 (1977), and the later Suite for Piano, Op. 92 (1999). The Op. 28 suite employs deep jazz idioms but is directly modeled after Baroque suites such as Johann Sebastian Bach's keyboard partitas, juxtaposing traditional dance forms like the Allemande, Courante, Sarabande, Gavotte, and Gigue with modern jazz grooves. In contrast, his later Op. 92 suite eschews historical dance titles for abstract, classically oriented tempo markings (Allegretto con delicatezza, Moderato, Allegro vivace, Presto), while maintaining a cohesive, multi-movement narrative driven by jazz harmony.

== Legacy ==
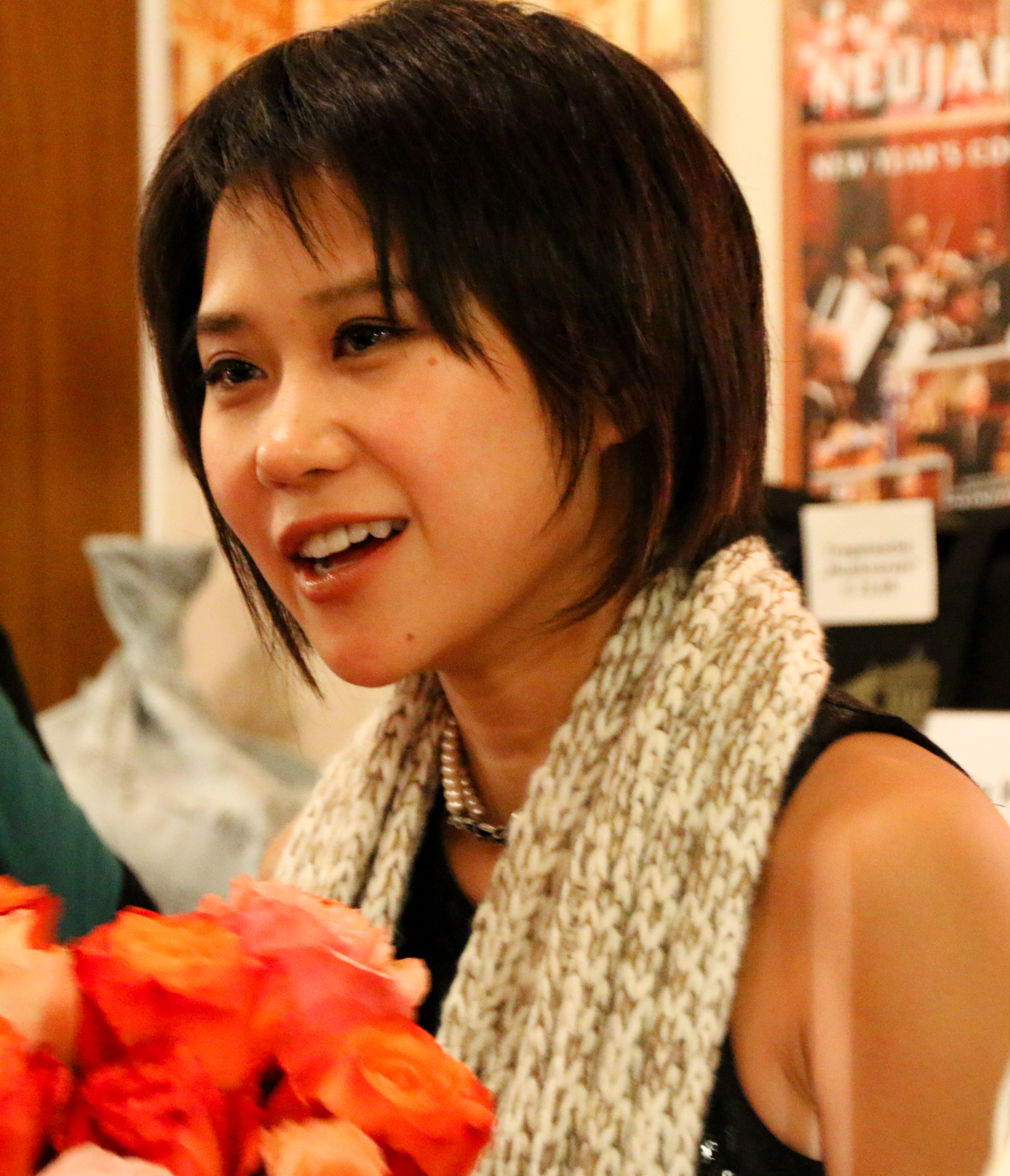
Yuja Wang in 2014. Wang is among the leading international virtuosos whose programming of Kapustin's works has cemented his place in the contemporary classical canon.

=== International recognition and contemporary repertoire ===
Prior to the year 2000, Kapustin's music was largely a secret among musicians in the former Soviet Union. The advent of the internet and social media later helped popularize his music globally, particularly among a younger demographic of musicians. His music experienced a rapid increase in international recognition aided by advocacy and recordings from pianists such as Marc-André Hamelin and Steven Osborne on the UK-based label Hyperion Records.

Record labels have also released several recordings of the composer performing his own music, particularly a series of solo albums produced by the Japanese label Triton between 1984 and 2007 (often titled "Kapustin Plays Kapustin").

Today, his music is frequently programmed internationally. The Toccatina from his Op. 40 études has been notably performed by Benjamin Grosvenor at the BBC Proms and by Lauren Zhang during her winning performance at the BBC Young Musician competition. His works are played by leading pianists including Yuja Wang, Ludmil Angelov, Frank Dupree, Masahiro Kawakami, Thomas Ang, Nikolai Petrov, Yeol Eum Son, Alexei Volodin, Daniel del Pino, Konstantin Semilakovs, Elisaveta Blumina, Nobuyuki Tsujii, and John Salmon, as well as by chamber ensembles such as the Ahn Trio, Trio Arbós, Frank Dupree Trio, Artemis Quartet, and the New Russian Quartet.

=== Scholarly reception and pedagogical value ===
In the 21st century, Kapustin's music has become the subject of extensive academic research, reflecting its growing stature in the classical music world. Numerous doctoral dissertations and scholarly articles have been published analyzing his unique compositional techniques, his synthesis of jazz harmony with classical form, and the performance practices required to interpret his music accurately.

Pedagogically, Kapustin's music is valued as a tool for classically trained pianists to study and internalize jazz rhythms, voicings, and articulations without needing to learn how to improvise natively. By notating the nuances of swing and syncopation, Kapustin created a body of work that serves as an accessible bridge between two musical worlds, securing his legacy as one of the most distinctive voices in contemporary classical piano literature.
