= List of compositions by Nikolai Kapustin =

The compositions of Nikolai Kapustin (1937–2020) are mostly for piano, either solo or accompanied. He wrote 20 piano sonatas, six piano concerti, and other compositions for ensembles such as five saxophones and an orchestra (Op. 22) and a concerto for double bass (Op. 76).

== Orchestral and big band music ==
- Op. 4: Chorale and Fugue for orchestra (1962)
- Op. 6: "Rose-Marie", fantasia for orchestra (1963)
- Op. 7: Fantasia on three children's songs for orchestra (1963)
- Op. 9: "The Trial", piece for orchestra (1966)
- Op. 10: "Big Band Sounds (The Sounds of Big Band)" for orchestra (1966)
- Op. 11: "Estacade" for big band (1966)
- Op. 12: "Aquarium-Blues" for big band (1967)
- Op. 15: "The Forest Story" for orchestra (1972)
- Op. 17: Three Pieces for orchestra (1972)
- Op. 21: Minuet for big band (1974)
- Op. 23: "Enigma" for big band (1975)
- Op. 24: March for orchestra (1975)
- Op. 26A: Day-Break ("Sunrise") for orchestra (1976)
- Op. 30: Two-movement Concerto for orchestra (1980)
- Op. 31: Elegy for orchestra (1980)
- Op. 32: "The Wind from the North", piece for orchestra (1981)
- Op. 34: "Meridian", piece for orchestra (1982)
- Op. 35: "Closed Curve" for orchestra (1982)
- Op. 37: "The Pleasant Meeting", piece for orchestra (1983)
- Op. 38: "Presentiment", piece for orchestra (1983)
- Op. 49: Sinfonietta for orchestra (1986)
- Op. 51: Overture for big band (1987)
- Op. 52: "Intrada", piece for big band (1988)

== Concertante music ==
=== Concertos ===
- Op. 2: Concerto for piano and orchestra No. 1 (1961)
- Op. 14: Concerto for piano and orchestra No. 2 (1974)
- Op. 48: Concerto for piano and orchestra No. 3 (1985)
- Op. 50: Concerto for alto saxophone and orchestra (1987)
- Op. 56: Concerto for piano and orchestra No. 4 (1989)
- Op. 72: Concerto for piano and orchestra No. 5 (1993)
- Op. 74: Concerto for piano and orchestra No. 6 (1993)
- Op. 76: Concerto for double bass and symphony orchestra (1994)
- Op. 85: Concerto for cello and orchestra (1997)
- Op. 103: Concerto No. 2 for cello and string orchestra (2002)
- Op. 105: Concerto for violin, piano and string orchestra (2002)
- Op. 141: Violin Concerto (2009)
- Op. 147: Concerto for piano and orchestra No. 1 (2nd edition) (2012)

=== Other works for soloist and orchestra or big band ===
- Op. 1: Concertino for piano and orchestra (1957)
- Op. 3: Variations for piano and big band (1962)
- Op. 5: Piece for trumpet and orchestra (1962)
- Op. 8: Toccata for piano and orchestra (1964)
- Op. 13: Intermezzo for piano and orchestra (1968)
- Op. 16: Nocturne in G major for piano and orchestra (1972)
- Op. 19: Étude for piano and orchestra (1974)
- Op. 20: Nocturne for piano and orchestra (1974)
- Op. 22: Piece for five saxophones and orchestra (1975)
- Op. 25: Concert Rhapsody for piano and orchestra (1976)
- Op. 29: Scherzo for piano and orchestra (1978)
- Op. 33: Piece for two pianos and orchestra (1982)

== Chamber music ==
- Op. 18: Four Pieces for instrumental ensemble (1973)
- Op. 27: Fantasia for jazz quartet (1976)
- Op. 42: "A Rush Hour" for ensemble (1985)
- Op. 43: "An April Day" for ensemble (1985)
- Op. 44: "The Morning" for ensemble (1985)
- Op. 57: Chamber Symphony for chamber orchestra (1990)
- Op. 63: Sonata for cello and piano No. 1 (1991)
- Op. 69: Sonata for viola and piano (1992)
- Op. 70: Sonata for violin and piano (1992)
- Op. 79: Piece for sextet (1995)
- Op. 84: Sonata for cello and piano No. 2 (1997)
- Op. 86: Trio for flute, cello and piano (1998)
- Op. 88: String Quartet (1998)
- Op. 89: Piano Quintet (1998)
- Op. 90: Concerto for eleven instruments (1998)
- Op. 91: Divertissement for two flutes, cello and piano (1998)
- Op. 93: Introduction and Scherzino for cello solo (1999)
- Op. 96: Elegy for cello and piano (1999)
- Op. 97: Burlesque for cello and piano (1999)
- Op. 98: Nearly Waltz for cello and piano (1999)
- Op. 99: Duet for alto saxophone and cello (1999)
- Op. 104: Concerto for two pianos and percussion (2002)
- Op. 106: Suite for viola, alto saxophone, piano and bass (2002)
- Op. 107: Variations on "Sweet Georgia Brown" for viola, alto saxophone, piano and bass (2002)
- Op. 124: Suite for cello solo (2004)
- Op. 125: Sonata for flute and piano (2004)
- Op. 126: Divertissement in Four Movements for violin, cello & piano (2005)
- Op. 132: String Quartet No. 2 (2007)
- Op. 136: Piano Trio No. 1 for violin, cello and piano (2009)
- Op. 142: Piano Trio No. 2 for violin, cello and piano (2010)
- Op. 150: "Rondo frivole", piece for string quartet (2013)
- Op. 154: "The Last Attempt", piece for string quartet (2014)
- Op. 155: Allegro for piano trio (2014)
- Op. 156: A Little Duo for flute and cello (2014)
- Op. 158: Sonatina for viola and piano (2015)

== Solo piano music ==
=== Piano sonatas ===
- Op. 39: Piano Sonata No. 1 in D major "Sonata-Fantasy" (1984)
- Op. 54: Piano Sonata No. 2 in E major (1989)
- Op. 55: Piano Sonata No. 3 (1990)
- Op. 60: Piano Sonata No. 4 (1991)
- Op. 61: Piano Sonata No. 5 (1991)
- Op. 62: Piano Sonata No. 6 (1991)
- Op. 64: Piano Sonata No. 7 (1991)
- Op. 77: Piano Sonata No. 8 (1995)
- Op. 78: Piano Sonata No. 9 (1995)
- Op. 81: Piano Sonata No. 10 (1996)
- Op. 101: Piano Sonata No. 11 "Twickenham" (2000)
- Op. 102: Piano Sonata No. 12 (2001)
- Op. 110: Piano sonata No. 13 (2003)
- Op. 120: Piano Sonata No. 14 (2004)
- Op. 127: Piano Sonata No. 15 "Fantasia quasi Sonata" (2005)
- Op. 131: Piano Sonata No. 16 (2006)
- Op. 134: Piano Sonata No. 17 (2008)
- Op. 135: Piano Sonata No. 18 (2008)
- Op. 143: Piano Sonata No. 19 (2011)
- Op. 144: Piano Sonata No. 20 (2011)

=== Sets of miniatures ===
- Op. 28: Suite In the Old Style for piano (1977)
- Op. 40: Eight Concert Études for piano (1985)
  - No. 1 in C major "Prelude"
  - No. 2 in A♭ major "Reverie"
  - No. 3 in E minor "Toccatina"
  - No. 4 in B major "Remembrance"
  - No. 5 in D major "Raillery"
  - No. 6 in B♭ major "Pastorale"
  - No. 7 in D♭ major "Intermezzo"
  - No. 8 in F minor "Finale"
- Op. 53: Twenty-Four Preludes for piano (1988)
- Op. 59: Ten Bagatelles for piano (1991)
- Op. 67: Three Études for piano (1992)
  - No. 1 "Glissandi"
  - No. 2 "Ripetizione"
  - No. 3 "Grappole"
- Op. 66: Three Impromptus for piano (1991)
- Op. 68: Five Etudes in Different Intervals for piano (1992)
- Op. 73: Ten Inventions for piano (1993)
- Op. 82: Twenty-four Preludes and Fugues for piano (1997)
- Op. 87: Seven Polyphonic Pieces for piano the left hand (1998)
- Op. 92: Suite for piano (four pieces for piano) (1999)
- Op. 122: Two Étude-like Trinkets for piano (2004)
- Op. 133: Six Little Preludes for piano (2007)

=== Shorter piano pieces ===
- Op. 26: Day-Break ("Sunrise") for piano (1976)
- Op. 36: Toccatina for piano (1983)
- Op. 41: Variations for piano (1984)
- Op. 45: "Motive Force", toccata for piano (1985)
- Op. 46: "Big Band Sounds (The Sounds of Big Band)" for piano (1986)
- Op. 47: "Contemplation (Meditation)" for piano (1987)
- Op. 58: Andante for piano (1990)
- Op. 65: Berceuse for piano (1991)
- Op. 71: Capriccio for piano (1992)
- Op. 75: Humoresque for piano (1994)
- Op. 80: Theme and Variations for piano (1996)
- Op. 83: Impromptu (Improvisation) for piano (1997)
- Op. 94: Ballad for piano (1999)
- Op. 95: Scherzo for piano (1999)
- Op. 100: Sonatina for piano (2000)
- Op. 108: Paraphrase on the theme of Paul Dvoirin for piano (2003)
- Op. 109: "There is Something Behind That" for piano (2003)
- Op. 111: "Gingerbread Man" for piano (2003)
- Op. 112: "End of the Rainbow" for piano (2003)
- Op. 113: "Wheel of Fortune" for piano (2003)
- Op. 114: "No Stop Signs" for piano (2003)
- Op. 115: Fantasia for piano (2003)
- Op. 116: Rondoletto for piano (2003)
- Op. 117: "Spice Island" for piano (2003)
- Op. 118: Paraphrase on "Aquarela do Brasil" by Ary Barroso for piano (2003)
- Op. 119: "Nothing to Lose" for piano (2004)
- Op. 121: "Vanity of Vanities" for piano (2004)
- Op. 123: Paraphrase on "Blue Bossa" by Kenny Dorham for piano (2004)
- Op. 128: Introduction and Rondo for piano (2006)
- Op. 130: Countermove for piano (2006)
- Op. 137: Good Intention for piano (2009)
- Op. 138: Sleight of Hand for piano (2009)
- Op. 139: Holy Cow for piano (2009)
- Op. 140: Freeway for piano (2009)
- Op. 148: Dialogue for piano (2013)
- Op. 149: Étude Courte mais Transcendente pour Piano (2013)
- Op. 151: Nobody is perfect for piano (2013)
- Op. 152: A Pianist in Jeopardy for piano (2013)
- Op. 153: Wandering for piano (2013)
- Op. 157: Curiosity for piano (2015)
- Op. 159: Rainy Weather for piano (2015)
- Op. 160: Something Else for piano (2015)
- Op. 161: The Moon Rainbow for piano (2016)

=== Piano four hands ===
- Op. 129: Paraphrase on Dizzy Gillespie's "Manteca" for two pianos, four hands (2006)
- Op. 145: Three for Two (Triptych) for two pianos, four hands (2012)
- Op. 146: Capriccio for piano, four hands (2012)

Kapustin also wrote 2 pianos/four-hand piano arrangements of Concertino, Op.1, Piano Concerto No.1, Op.2, Piano Concerto No.2, Op.14, Concert Rhapsody, Op.25, Concerto for Orchestra, Op.30, Piano Concerto No.3, Op.48, Sinfonietta, Op.49, Piano Concerto No.4, Op.56, Piano Concerto No.5, Op.72, and Piano Concerto No.6, Op.73.

== Works by opus number ==
- Op. 1: Concertino for piano and orchestra (1957)
- Op. 2: Concerto for piano and orchestra No. 1 (1961)
- Op. 3: Variations for piano and big band (1962)
- Op. 4: Chorale and Fugue for orchestra (1962)
- Op. 5: Piece for trumpet and orchestra (1962)
- Op. 6: "Rose-Marie", fantasia for orchestra (1963)
- Op. 7: Fantasia on three children's songs for orchestra (1963)
- Op. 8: Toccata for piano and orchestra (1964)
- Op. 9: "The Trial", piece for orchestra (1966)
- Op. 10: "Big Band Sounds (The Sounds of Big Band)" for orchestra (1966)
- Op. 11: "Estacade" for big band (1966)
- Op. 12: "Aquarium-Blues" for big band (1967)
- Op. 13: Intermezzo for piano and orchestra (1968)
- Op. 14: Concerto for piano and orchestra No. 2 (1974)
- Op. 15: "The Forest Story" for orchestra (1972)
- Op. 16: Nocturne in G major for piano and orchestra (1972)
- Op. 17: Three Pieces for orchestra (1972)
- Op. 18: Four Pieces for instrumental ensemble (1973)
- Op. 19: Étude for piano and orchestra (1974)
- Op. 20: Nocturne for piano and orchestra (1974)
- Op. 21: Minuet for big band (1974)
- Op. 22: Piece for five saxophones and orchestra (1975)
- Op. 23: "Enigma" for big band (1975)
- Op. 24: March for orchestra (1975)
- Op. 25: Concert Rhapsody for piano and orchestra (1976)
- Op. 26: Day-Break ("Sunrise") for piano (1976)
- Op. 26A: Day-Break ("Sunrise") for orchestra (1976)
- Op. 27: Fantasia for jazz quartet (1976)
- Op. 28: Suite In the Old Style for piano (1977)
- Op. 29: Scherzo for piano and orchestra (1978)
- Op. 30: Two-movement Concerto for orchestra (1980)
- Op. 31: Elegy for orchestra (1980)
- Op. 32: "The Wind from the North", piece for orchestra (1981)
- Op. 33: Piece for two pianos and orchestra (1982)
- Op. 34: "Meridian", piece for orchestra (1982)
- Op. 35: "Closed Curve" for orchestra (1982)
- Op. 36: Toccatina for piano (1983)
- Op. 37: "The Pleasant Meeting", piece for orchestra (1983)
- Op. 38: "Presentiment", piece for orchestra (1983)
- Op. 39: Piano Sonata No. 1 "Sonata-Fantasy" (1984)
- Op. 40: Eight Concert Études for piano (1985)
  - No. 1 in C major "Prelude"
  - No. 2 in A♭ major "Reverie"
  - No. 3 in E minor "Toccatina"
  - No. 4 in B major "Remembrance"
  - No. 5 in D major "Raillery"
  - No. 6 in B♭ major "Pastorale"
  - No. 7 in D♭ major "Intermezzo"
  - No. 8 in F minor "Finale"
- Op. 41: Variations for piano (1984)
- Op. 42: "A Rush Hour" for ensemble (1985)
- Op. 43: "An April Day" for ensemble (1985)
- Op. 44: "The Morning" for ensemble (1985)
- Op. 45: "Motive Force", toccata for piano (1985)
- Op. 46: "Big Band Sounds (The Sounds of Big Band)" for piano (1986)
- Op. 47: "Contemplation (Meditation)" for piano (1987)
- Op. 48: Concerto for piano and orchestra No. 3 (1985)
- Op. 49: Sinfonietta for orchestra (1986)
- Op. 50: Concerto for alto saxophone and orchestra (1987)
- Op. 51: Overture for big band (1987)
- Op. 52: "Intrada", piece for big band (1988)
- Op. 53: Twenty-Four Preludes for piano (1988)
- Op. 54: Piano Sonata No. 2 (1989)
- Op. 55: Piano Sonata No. 3 (1990)
- Op. 56: Concerto for piano and orchestra No. 4 (1990)
- Op. 57: Chamber Symphony for chamber orchestra (1990)
- Op. 58: Andante for piano (1990)
- Op. 59: Ten Bagatelles for piano (1991)
- Op. 60: Piano Sonata No. 4 (1991)
- Op. 61: Piano Sonata No. 5 (1991)
- Op. 62: Piano Sonata No. 6 (1991)
- Op. 63: Sonata for cello and piano No. 1 (1991)
- Op. 64: Piano Sonata No. 7 (1991)
- Op. 65: Berceuse for piano (1991)
- Op. 66: Three Impromptus for piano (1991)
- Op. 67: Three Études for piano (1992)
  - No. 1 "Glissandi"
  - No. 2 "Ripetizione"
  - No. 3 "Grappole"
- Op. 68: Five Études in Different Intervals for piano (1992)
- Op. 69: Sonata for viola and piano (1992)
- Op. 70: Sonata for violin and piano (1992)
- Op. 71: Capriccio for piano (1992)
- Op. 72: Concerto for piano and orchestra No. 5 (1993)
- Op. 73: Ten Inventions for piano (1993)
- Op. 74: Concerto for piano and orchestra No. 6 (1993)
- Op. 75: Humoresque for piano (1994)
- Op. 76: Concerto for double bass and symphony orchestra (1994)
- Op. 77: Piano Sonata No. 8 (1995)
- Op. 78: Piano Sonata No. 9 (1995)
- Op. 79: Piece for sextet (1995)
- Op. 80: Theme and Variations for piano (1996)
- Op. 81: Piano Sonata No. 10 (1996)
- Op. 82: Twenty-four Preludes and Fugues for piano (1997)
- Op. 83: Impromptu (Improvisation) for piano (1997)
- Op. 84: Sonata for cello and piano No. 2 (1997)
- Op. 85: Concerto for cello and orchestra (1997)
- Op. 86: Trio for flute, cello and piano (1998)
- Op. 87: Seven Polyphonic Pieces for piano the left hand (1998)
- Op. 88: String Quartet (1998)
- Op. 89: Piano Quintet (1998)
- Op. 90: Concerto for eleven instruments (1998)
- Op. 91: Divertissement for two flutes, cello and piano (1998)
- Op. 92: Suite for piano (four pieces for piano) (1999)
- Op. 93: Introduction and Scherzino for cello solo (1999)
- Op. 94: Ballad for piano (1999)
- Op. 95: Scherzo for piano (1999)
- Op. 96: Elegy for cello and piano (1999)
- Op. 97: Burlesque for cello and piano (1999)
- Op. 98: Nearly Waltz for cello and piano (1999)
- Op. 99: Duet for alto saxophone and cello (1999)
- Op. 100: Sonatina for piano (2000)
- Op. 101: Piano Sonata No. 11 "Twickenham" (2000)
- Op. 102: Piano Sonata No. 12 (2001)
- Op. 103: Concerto No. 2 for cello and string orchestra (2002)
- Op. 104: Concerto for two pianos and percussion (2002)
- Op. 105: Concerto for violin, piano and string orchestra (2002)
- Op. 106: Suite for viola, alto saxophone, piano and bass (2002)
- Op. 107: Variations on "Sweet Georgia Brown" for viola, alto saxophone, piano and bass (2002)
- Op. 108: Paraphrase on the theme of Paul Dvoirin for piano (2003)
- Op. 109: "There is Something Behind That" for piano (2003)
- Op. 110: Piano sonata No. 13 (2003)
- Op. 111: "Gingerbread Man" for piano (2003)
- Op. 112: "End of the Rainbow" for piano (2003)
- Op. 113: "Wheel of Fortune" for piano (2003)
- Op. 114: "No Stop Signs" for piano (2003)
- Op. 115: Fantasia for piano (2003)
- Op. 116: Rondoletto for piano (2003)
- Op. 117: "Spice Island" for piano (2003)
- Op. 118: Paraphrase on "Aquarela do Brasil" by Ary Barroso for piano (2003)
- Op. 119: "Nothing to Loose" for piano (2004)
- Op. 120: Piano Sonata No. 14 (2004)
- Op. 121: "Vanity of Vanities" for piano (2004)
- Op. 122: Two Étude-like Trinkets for piano (2004)
- Op. 123: Paraphrase on "Blue Bossa" by Kenny Dorham for piano (2004)
- Op. 124: Suite for cello solo (2004)
- Op. 125: Sonata for flute and piano (2004)
- Op. 126: Divertissement in Four Movements for violin, cello & piano (2005)
- Op. 127: Piano Sonata No. 15 "Fantasia quasi Sonata" (2005)
- Op. 128: Introduction and Rondo for piano (2006)
- Op. 129: Paraphrase on Dizzy Gillespie's "Manteca" for two pianos, four hands (2006)
- Op. 130: Countermove for piano (2006)
- Op. 131: Piano Sonata No. 16 (2006)
- Op. 132: String Quartet No. 2 (2007)
- Op. 133: Six Little Preludes for piano (2007)
- Op. 134: Piano Sonata No. 17 (2008)
- Op. 135: Piano Sonata No. 18 (2008)
- Op. 136: Piano Trio No. 1 for violin, cello and piano (2009)
- Op. 137: Good Intention for piano (2009)
- Op. 138: Sleight of Hand for piano (2009)
- Op. 139: Holy Cow for piano (2009)
- Op. 140: Freeway for piano (2009)
- Op. 141: Violin Concerto (2009)
- Op. 142: Piano Trio No. 2 for violin, cello and piano (2010)
- Op. 143: Piano Sonata No. 19 (2011)
- Op. 144: Piano Sonata No. 20 (2011)
- Op. 145: Three for Two (Triptych) for two pianos, four hands (2012)
- Op. 146: Capriccio for piano 4 hands (2012)
- Op. 147: Concerto for piano and orchestra No. 1 (2nd edition) (2012)
- Op. 148: Dialogue for piano (2013)
- Op. 149: Étude Courte mais Transcendente pour Piano (2013)
- Op. 150: "Rondo frivole", piece for string quartet (2013)
- Op. 151: Nobody is perfect for piano (2013)
- Op. 152: A Pianist in Jeopardy for piano (2013)
- Op. 153: Wandering for piano (2013)
- Op. 154: "The Last Attempt", piece for string quartet (2014)
- Op. 155: Allegro for piano trio (2014)
- Op. 156: A Little Duo for flute and cello (2014)
- Op. 157: Curiosity for piano (2015)
- Op. 158: Sonatina for viola and piano (2015)
- Op. 159: Rainy Weather for piano (2015)
- Op. 160: Something Else for piano (2015)
- Op. 161: Moon Rainbow for piano (2016)
