= Aleksey Zubov =

Russian jazz saxophonist and composer

Aleksey Zubov in 2013.

Aleksey Nikolayevich Zubov, sometimes given as Alexi Zubov or Alexei Zoubov, (November 15, 1936, Moscow – January 21, 2021, Los Angeles) was a Russian jazz saxophonist and composer. A self taught musician, he studied physics at Moscow State University (MSU) where he graduated in 1958. He was an important figure in the Soviet jazz scene from the late 1950s into the 1980s; with several Russian jazz critics considering him the greatest Russian saxophonist of the era. From 1960 to 1965 he was a member of Oleg Lundstrem's orchestra. He was particularly successful in Moscow in a bebop-oriented jazz ensemble known as the Eight.

Grove Music Online stated that Zubov's album Barometr (1983) was a good representation of his playing. In 1984 he moved from Moscow to Los Angeles. One of his later albums, Rejuvenation Project (2006), was made with musicians from California. He performed at the Jazz Globus Festival in Israel in 2006, 2007, and 2013. He also returned to Russia for performances in Moscow in 2012 and 2013. In addition to playing with various jazz bands and musicians over the years, he was also active as a film score composer.
