= Oleg Lundstrem =

Russian composer (1916–2005)

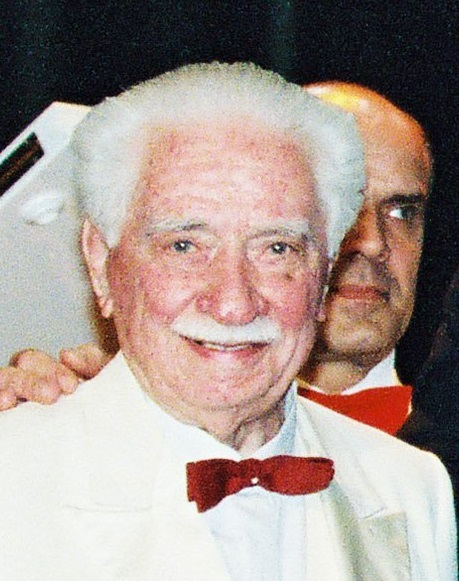
Oleg Lundstrem in 2000

Oleg Leonidovich Lundstrem (also spelled Lundstroem, Lundström, Russian: Олег Леонидович Лундстрем; 2 April 1916, Chita — 14 October 2005, Korolyov, Moscow Oblast) was a Soviet and Russian jazz composer and conductor of the Oleg Lundstrem Orchestra, one of the earliest officially recognized jazz bands in the Soviet Union (full official name: The State Oleg Lundstrem Chamber Orchestra of Jazz Music, Russian: Государственный камерный оркестр джазовой музыки под управлением Олега Лундстрема; currently, Oleg Lundstrem Memorial State Jazz Orchestra, Russian: Государственный оркестр джазовой музыки имени Олега Лундстрема).

Lundstrem was born to a family of musicians in Chita, Transbaikal Oblast. His family moved to Harbin, China, when he was five. In 1935, inspired by Duke Ellington's "Dear Old Southland" record which he occasionally purchased in Harbin for a private party, Lundstrem joined forces with eight other young Russian amateur musicians and formed the Oleg Lundstrem Orchestra. In 1936, the band moved to Shanghai, where they immediately became popular among the public. Until 1947, the band was an important part of Shanghai's jazz scene, along with Buck Clayton Orchestra.

After World War II, in 1947, Lundstrem returned to the Soviet Union and settled in Kazan, where he worked as a violinist in the opera and ballet theatre, while keeping his jazz orchestra as a side act. In 1956, the Oleg Lundstrem Orchestra moved to Moscow; Lundstrem was appointed by the Soviet cultural authorities as the orchestra's art director and conductor.

In 1994, the Guinness Book of Records recognized the Lundstrem band as the oldest continuously existing jazz band in the world. In 1998, he was awarded the Russian Federation State Award. He died at the age of 89 from natural causes at his home in the village of Valentinovka, Moscow suburbs, and was buried at the cemetery of the Obraztsovo village, Moscow suburbs.

== Instrumental pieces for jazz band ==
- "Interlude" - 1945
- "Mirage" - 1947
- "The Lilac is Flourishing" - 1955
- "Humoresque" - 1957
- "Improvisation" ("Atom-bugi") - 1957
- "Humoresque" - 1958
- "A Song Without Words" - 1960
- "Etude for the band" (or "Study for Orchestra") - 1960
- "Prologue" - 1963
- "We Are Together Again" - 1969
- "Bukhara Design" - 1972
- "In the mountains of Georgia" - 1973
- "The Ways of Love" - 1975
- "Speedway" - 1980
- "The Legend of Söyembikä" - 1981
- "At Dawn" - 1984

== Honours and awards ==
- Honoured Artist of the RSFSR (1973)
- People's Artist of the RSFSR (1984)
- State Prize of the Russian Federation (1998)
- Order of Merit for the Fatherland, 3rd class
