= Jesus Gonzalez =

Jesus Gonzalez may refer to:

== People in arts and entertainment ==
- Jesús González Rubio (died 1874), Mexican music composer and educator
- Jesús González Alonso (born 1946), Spanish pianist
- J. F. Gonzalez (born 1964), American author of horror fiction

== People in politics ==
- Jesús González Ortega (1822-1882), Mexican military man and politician
- Jesús González Schmal (born 1942), Mexican lawyer and politician
- Jesús Gónzález Macías (born 1972), Mexican politician
- Jesus C. Gonzalez (born 1986), American gun rights advocate convicted of reckless homicide in a shooting

== People in sports ==
=== Association football ===
- Jesús González (footballer, born 1969) (Jesús González Romero), Mexican football manager and former footballer
- Jesus Gonzalez (soccer, born 1991), Puerto Rican-American soccer player
- Jesús González (footballer, born 1994) (Jesús González Díaz), Spanish footballer
- Jesús González (footballer, born 1998) (Jesús Eduardo González), Mexican footballer

=== Other sports ===
- Jesús González (basketball) (born 1986), Mexican basketball player at the 2015 Pan American Games
- Jesús González (boxer) (born 1984), American professional boxer
- Jesús González (Paralympian), Spanish parasport athlete
- Jesús González (rower, born 1959), Spanish Olympic rower
- Jesús González (rower, born 1974), Spanish Olympic rower
- Jesús González (runner), Spanish distance runner and competitor at the 1992 IAAF World Road Relay Championships
- Jesús González (swimmer) (born 1974), Mexican swimmer
- Jesús González (weightlifter) (born 1991), Venezuelan weightlifter at the 2020 Pan American Weightlifting Championships
- Jesús González (diver) (born 2004), Venezuelan diver at the 2023 World Aquatics Championships
