= Paloma O'Shea International Piano Competition =

International piano competition

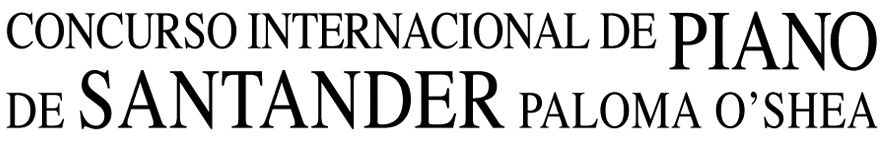

The Paloma O'Shea Santander International Piano Competition (in Spanish: Concurso Internacional de Piano de Santander "Paloma O'Shea") is a piano competition taking place in Santander, Spain. Founded in 1972 by Paloma O'Shea as a national prize, it turned into an international competition in its 2nd edition, and was professionalized in the mid-1970s, being accepted into the World Federation of International Music Competitions in 1976.

Organized by the Albéniz Foundation and chaired by the Infanta Margarita and sponsored by a network of civil service and private companies, it arranges an extensive world tour for the winners, including debuts in auditoriums such as the National Auditorium of Music and the Wigmore Hall and cash prizes. The competition takes place in the Palacio de Festivales de Cantabria.

== The competition ==
Currently, 20 pianists are accepted into the competition through a demanding shortlist of candidates. The competition consists of a preliminary round after a video-based admission round (pre-auditions in Spain, Paris, New York and Moscow), a recital round, a chamber music round, and final concerto round with a symphony orchestra.

== Guest artists ==
During the last stages of the competition, the participants perform with guest artists and ensembles. Past ensembles include the London Symphony Orchestra, Dresden Philharmonic, Spanish National Orchestra, Madrid Symphony Orchestra, Northern Sinfonia, Scottish Chamber Orchestra, RTVE Symphony Orchestra, Takács Quartet, Ysaÿe Quartet, Quiroga Quartet and the Vienna Chamber Orchestra and conductors Philippe Entremont, Sergiu Comissiona, Miguel Ángel Gómez Martínez, and Jesús López Cobos.

== Juries ==
Members of the jury have included Josep Colom, Gary Graffman, Federico Mompou, Vlado Perlemuter, Joaquín Achúcarro, Aldo Ciccolini, Nikita Magaloff, Paul Badura-Skoda, Hiroko Nakamura, Fou Ts'ong, Eliso Virsaladze, Elisabeth Leonskaja, Rafael Orozco, Philippe Entremont, Alicia de Larrocha, Dmitri Bashkirov, Dmitri Alexeev, Akiko Ebi, Márta Gulyás and Arie Vardi.

== Prize winners ==
This is a partial listing of prize-winners of the Paloma O'Shea International Piano Competition.

Year	Grand Prize	2nd prize	3rd prize	Other
1972	(Spain) Josep Colom	(Spain) Jesús González Alonso	—	Honour Certificates: (Spain) Martín Millán; (Spain) Agustín Vergara
1974	(Japan) Ruriko Kikuchi	(Spain) Jesús González Alonso (Spain) José M. Martínez Pínzolas	(Spain) María T. Berrueta de Rubio	Honour Certificates: (United Kingdom) Susan A. Howes; (Spain) Manuel Quesada; (Spain) María H. Revilla
1975	(United States) Marioara Trifan	(United Kingdom) Peter Bithell	(United States) Rebecca A. Penneys	4th: (France) Silvie Carbonel; 5th: (West Germany) Margarita Höhenrieder
1976	(Turkey) Hüseyin Sermet	(Czechoslovakia) Ivan Klánský	Not awarded	4th: (Poland) Janina Drath (Brazil) Paulo E. Gori 5th: (Japan) Nina Hamaguchi; 6th: Marie Sprimont; 7th: (Czechoslovakia) Milan Langer
1977	(Egypt) Ramzi Yassa	(United Kingdom) Jeremy Atkins (United States) David Allen Wehr	Not awarded	Special Prizes: (France) Jean G. Ferlan; (Japan) Kazuko Hayami; (Canada) Marc Ponthus
1978	(Spain) Josep Colom	(France) Frédéric Aguessy	(Soviet Union) Anna Manasarova	4th prize: (Soviet Union) Andrey Diyev; Other prizes: (Poland) Anna Jastrzebska-Quinn; (South Korea) Kim Myung Chung; (Bulgaria) Krassimir Taskov
1980	Not awarded	(United Kingdom) Barry Douglas	(Romania) Dan Atanasiu (Italy) Francesco Nicolosi	Antonio Lavín prize: (Japan) Yumiko Maruyama; Ana de los Ríos prize: (Japan) Megumi Umene; Conservatory prize: (Syria) Gaswan K. Zerikly
1982	(South Africa) Marc Raubenheimer	(Soviet Union) Oleg Volkov	(France) Yves Rault	4th: (Hong Kong) Alec Chien; 5th: (France) Eric N'Kaoua; 6th: (Japan) Kazuoki Fujii
1984	(Republic of Ireland) Hugh Tinney	(Brazil) José Carlos Cocarelli	(Soviet Union) Rauf Kasimov	4th: (China) Fei-Ping Hsu; 5th: (Argentina) Daniel Rivera; 6th: (United States) William Koehler; 7th: (Soviet Union) Nigora Akhmedova; 8th: (United States) Edward Zilberkant; Special prize: (Soviet Union) Viktor Chernelievsky
1987	(United States) David Allen Wehr	(Soviet Union) Sergey Yerokhin	(Germany) Bernd Glemser	4th: (Soviet Union) Pavel Nersessian (China) Xiang-Dong Kong 5th: (Austria) Matthias Fletzberger
	Grand Prize	Honour Prize	Honour mentions	Finalist prizes
1990	Not awarded	(Soviet Union) Sergey Yerokhin	(Netherlands) David Kuijken	(Italy) Brenno Ambrosini (Soviet Union) Viktor Lyadov (France) Jean-François Dichamp (Spain) Claudio Martínez Mehner Semifinalists diploma (France) Isabel Dubuis (Bulgaria) Mariana Gurkova (Soviet Union) Oxana Rapita (Soviet Union) Alexander Sandler (United States) Emily White (Spain) Marta Zabaleta
1992	(Uzbekistan) Eldar Nebolsin	(China) Xu Zhong	—	(Germany) Markus Groh (Bulgaria) Mariana Gurkova (Brazil) Eduardo Monteiro (Russia) Vadim Rudenko
1995	Not awarded	(Italy) Enrico Pompili	—	(Latvia) Armands Ābols (United States) Carl Cranmer (Spain) Miguel Ituarte (Russia) (Israel) Polina Leschenko (Canada) David M. Louie
1998	(South Korea) Yung Wook Yoo	(South Korea) Jong Hwa Park	(Bulgaria) Plamena Mangova	Laureate prizes: (Spain) Gustavo Díaz-Jerez; (Philippines) Albert Tiu; (Russia) Alexei Volodin
2002	Not awarded	(Russia) (Israel) Boris Giltburg	(China) Ning An (South Korea) Soyeon Lee	Laureate prizes: (China) Yunjie Chen; (Taiwan) Chih-Han Liu; (Ukraine) Alexander Romanovsky; (South Korea) Minsoo Sohn
	Grand Prize	2nd prize	3rd prize	Audience Prize
2005	(Italy) Alberto Nosè	(Germany) Herbert Schuch	(China) Jie Chen	(Italy) Alberto Nosè
2008	(China) Jue Wang	(Hong Kong) (Canada) Avan Yu	(Italy) Shizuka Susanna Salvemini	(Hong Kong) (Canada) Avan Yu
2012	Not awarded	(South Korea) Ahn Ah-ruem	(Georgia (country)) Tamar Beraia (Hungary) János Palojtay	(Georgia (country)) Tamar Beraia
2015	(Spain) Juan Pérez Floristán	(South Korea) David Jae-Weon Huh	(China) Jianing Kong	(Spain) Juan Pérez Floristán
2018	(Ukraine) Dmytro Choni	(China) Yutong Sun	(Russia) Aleksandr Kliushko	(Spain) Juan Carlos Fernández-Nieto
2022	(Canada) Jaeden Izik-Dzurko	(China) Xiaolu Zang	(France) (Japan) Marcel Tadokoro	(Canada) Jaeden Izik-Dzurko

== Special prizes ==
Year	Best Spanish contestant	Contemporary music	Chamber music	Spanish music
1978				(Spain) María Teresa Berrueta de Rubio
1980		(West Germany) Martin Doerrie		(Japan) Michiko Tsuda
1982		(France) Yves Rault		(France) Eric N'Kaoua
1984	(Spain) Luis Á. Sarobe	(United States) William Koehler	(United States) William Koehler	(Czechoslovakia) Zuzana Paulechová
1987	(Spain) Jorge L. Otero	(France) Claire Desert	(France) Claire Desert	(Brazil) Clélia Iruzun
1990	(Spain) Claudio Martínez Mehner	(Netherlands) David Kuijken	(Soviet Union) Viktor Lyadov	(Bulgaria) Mariana Gurkova
1992	(Spain) Marta Zabaleta	(Finland) Laura Mikkola	(Russia) Tatiana Pavlova	(China) Wi Yu
1995		(Italy) Enrico Pompili	(Armenia) Armen Babakhanian	(United States) Carl Cranmer

== Grant-prizes ==
Year			
1987	(China) Xiang-Dong Kong		
1990	(France) Jean-François Dichamp	(Spain) Claudio Martínez Mehner	(Italy) Giorgia Tomassi
1992	(Spain) Carlos Apellániz	(Finland) Laura Mikkola	(Ukraine) Andrei Zheltonog
1995	(United Kingdom) Freddy Kempf	(Russia) (Israel) Polina Leschenko	

== See also ==
- Albéniz Foundation
- Escuela Superior de Música Reina Sofía
- List of classical music competitions
- Paloma O'Shea (founder of the competition)*
