= Juan Pérez Floristán =

Spanish pianist

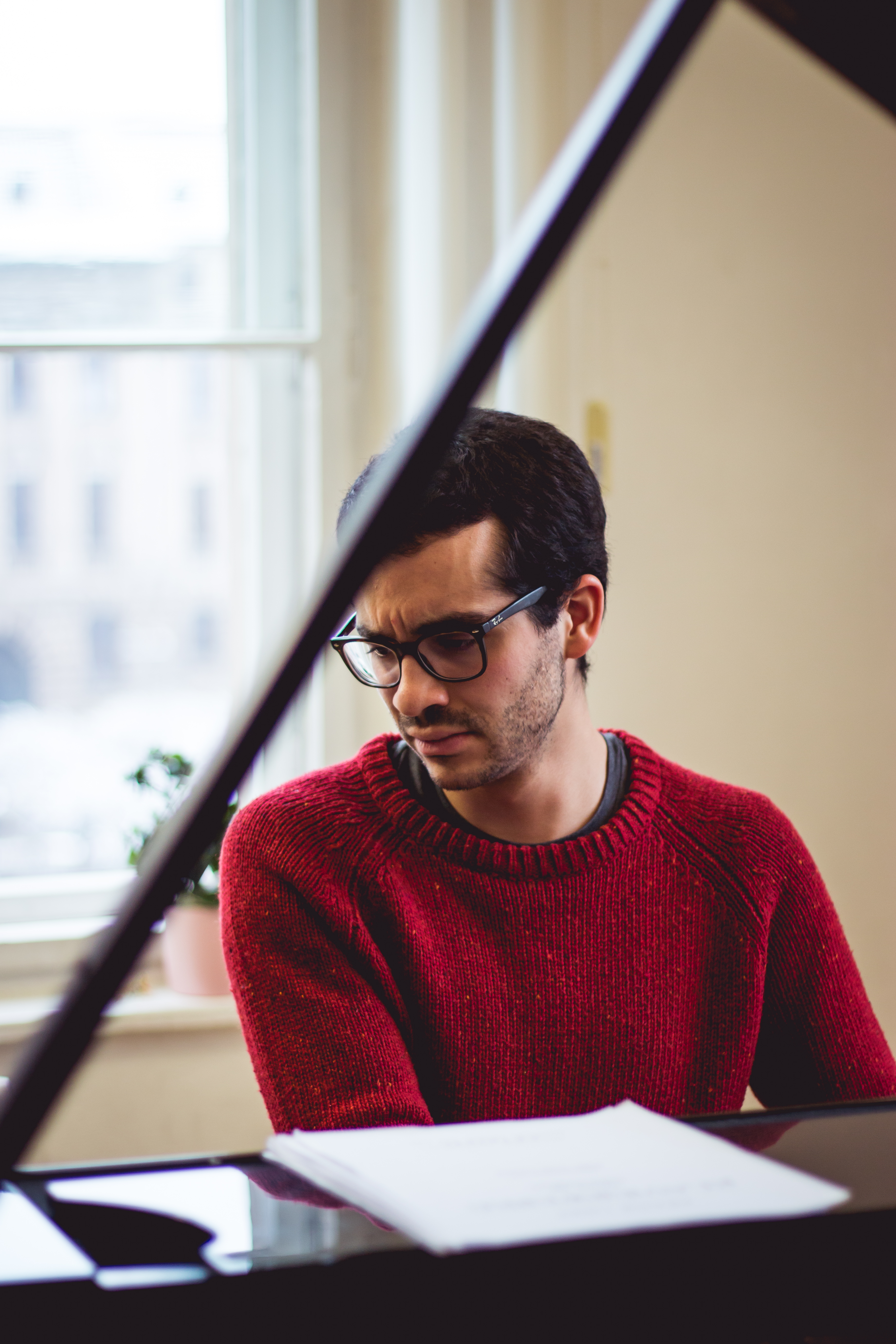
Juan Pérez Floristán

Juan Pérez Floristán (born in 1993) is a Spanish classical pianist.

== Biography and career ==
He was born in Seville in 1993. He has been in contact with important personalities of the music world, both in Spain and abroad: Daniel Barenboim, Elisabeth Leonskaja, Ferenc Rados, Claudio Martínez Mehner, Menahem Pressler, Ana Guijarro and Ralf Gothóni. As student of Reina Sofía School of Music, he trained under Galina Eguiazarova. After that, he went on to continue his studies at Hanns Eisler School of Music in Berlin with Eldar Nebolsin, a former student of Reina Sofía School of Music himself.

Juan Pérez Floristán won the first prize and audience award of the 2015 Paloma O'Shea Santander International Piano Competition in Spain.

In 2018 he won the first prize of the Kissinger Klavierolymp (Kissingen Piano Olympics) in Germany.

In May 2021 won the first prize of the Arthur Rubinstein International Piano Master Competition, which took place in Tel Aviv.
