= Vestards Šimkus =

Latvian pianist, composer and improviser (born 1984)

- Born: 21 August 1984 (age 41)
- Origin: Jūrmala, Latvian SSR
- Genres: Classical music
- Occupations: composer, pianist
- Years active: 1990s–present
- Website: http://facebook.com/vestard.shimkus

Vestards Šimkus (Vestard Shimkus, born 21 August 1984 in Jūrmala) is a Latvian pianist, composer and improviser.

He has won several international and national awards, plays classical repertoire, composes music for cinema and theatre, and performs his own compositions and spontaneous improvisations. His younger sister Aurēlija Šimkus also is a pianist.

== Biography ==
Vestards Šimkus was born on 21 August 1984 in Jūrmala, Latvia. His mother Iveta Šimkus is a published poet and a teacher of literature. His father Gunārs Šimkus used to be an art-rock musician who was active in the 1960s and 1970s and founded the first rock band named Katedrāle in Latvia. His sister Aurēlija is an accomplished pianist and recording artist. Šimkus started to play the piano in age of 5. From 1990 until 2002, he studied in Emīls Dārziņš Music School in Riga, where his teachers were Ruta Švinka, Ligita Muižarāja, Teofils Biķis and Sergejs Osokins. In 2002/2003, he studied at the University of Southern California under Daniel Pollack. From 2004 to 2006, he studied at the Reina Sofía School of Music in Madrid under Dimitri Bashkirov and Claudio Martinez Mehner. In 2006 to 2008, he studied at the Richard Strauss Konservatorium in Munich under Vadim Suchanov. Shimkus has also studied composition for five years under the renowned Latvian contemporary composer Pēteris Vasks. He performs improvised concerts, composes for cinema and takes part in experimental events with actors and performance artists.

In 2012, Šimkus married the opera singer Elīna Volkmane, now Elīna Šimkus.

International recognition came to Vestard Šimkus after his debut performances with BBC Philharmonic, City of Birmingham Symphony Orchestra, Orchestre National de France, Czech Philharmonic, KREMERata Baltica, NDR Symphony Orchestra of Hamburg.

He has also played chamber music with Borodin Quartet, Vertavo Quartet, Ciurlionis Quartet, Quatuor Leonis and others. As a solo pianist, he has performed in major concert halls around the world, including Konzerthaus (Vienna), Konzerthaus Berlin, Tokyo Opera City, Radio France (Paris), Berwaldhallen (Stockholm), Konserthuset (Stockholm), Moscow Conservatory, Palau de la Musica (Barcelona), Sala Verdi (Milano), and Oriental Art Center (Shanghai).

His repertoire ranges from Baroque Music to the contemporary music of the 21st century. He often plays recitals where classical works form a dialogue with the recent contemporary music, including his own compositions. He occasionally performs entirely improvised solo concerts inspired by jazz, contemporary classical music, film music, early music and folk music.

Šimkus has written two piano concertos and a number of solo piano and chamber music works, some of which have been published by Schott Verlag, as well as music for cinema and theatre.

== Selected awards ==
- 1st prize at the Los Angeles F. Liszt International Pianists Competition (USA, 2002)
- Order of the White Star of Estonia (2005)
- 1st prize at the 5th "Klavierolymp" International Piano Competition related to the festival Kissinger Sommer in Bad Kissingen (Germany, 2007)
- 1st prize and "Audience Prize" at the 55th Maria Canals International Music Competition in Barcelona (Spain, 2009)
- Golden Order of Poland for an outstanding contribution to the concert series dedicated to the 200th anniversary of the birth of Frederic Chopin (2010)
- "LOTTO-Förderpreis" of the Rheingau Musik Festival (Germany, 2014)
- TOYP (Ten Outstanding Young Persons) Award of Latvian Junior Chamber International (Latvia, 2016)
- "Lielais Kristaps" Latvian Film Festival Award in the category "Best Original Score" for the original music written for "Ausma" ("Dawn", directed by Laila Pakalniņa) (Latvia, 2016)
- Order of the Three Stars 4th Class of Latvia (2021)

== Discography ==
- "The Bells" (Odradek Records, USA, 2016). Includes "Rhapsody On A Theme Of Paganini" by Sergei Rachmaninov. Recorded together with Latvian National Symphony Orchestra conducted by Andris Poga.
- "Vestard Shimkus. Rachmaninoff" (Artalinna, France, 2014).
- "Atsaukšanās" (Upe, Latvia, 2014). Featuring fragments from piano works of Bach, Chopin, Liszt, Scriabin, Prokofiev, Shostakovich, Ravel, and Vestard Shimkus. Includes poetry written and read by Imants Ziedonis.
- "Wagner Idyll" (ARS Produktion, Germany, 2012).
- "Interview With Beethoven" (ARS Produktion, Germany, 2011).
- "Antonio Soler. Sonatas Nos.16-27" (Naxos, 2011).
- "Pēteris Vasks. The Seasons" (Wergo, Germany, 2010).
- "Glenn Gould. Piano Works" (Schott Music & Media, Germany, 2006). Released as an addition to the German edition of the book "Glenn Gould. Die Biographie" by Kevin Bazzana.
- "Vestard Shimkus. Fantasies" (Carmina Baltica, Latvia, 2003). Featuring piano works of Bach/Busoni, Chopin, Liszt and Mendelssohn/Horowitz.
