= Aimard =

Aimard is a surname. Notable people with the surname include:

- Gustave Aimard, (1818–1883), French author
- Pierre-Laurent Aimard (born 1957), French pianist
- Valérie Aimard (born 1969), French cellist
