= XVI Paloma O'Shea International Piano Competition =

The XVI Paloma O'Shea International Piano Competition took place at the Palacio de Festivales in Santander, Spain, from July 25 to August 7, 2008. Twenty pianists, selected through three shortlists of candidates (Madrid, Moscow and New York) took part in the event. The Dresden Philharmonic accompanied the three finalists in the final on August 6. Both the Semi-finals and the Final were broadcast through TVE.

== Jury ==
  - (Russia) Dmitry Alexeev
  - (Germany) Klaus Hellwig
  - (United States) Jerome Lowenthal
  - (Portugal) Luis Pereira Leal
  - (Italy) Sergio Perticaroli
  - (United States) Jerome Rose
  - (France) Jacques Rouvier
  - (China) Yang Liqing

(Italy) Maria Tipo could not travel to Santander due to health problems.

== Competition results, by rounds ==
=== First round ===
July 25–27, 16:00-23:00. Palacio de Festivales, Sala Pereda. Recital.

  - (Ukraine) Alina Artemyeva
  - (Belgium) Lucas Blondeel
  - (Serbia) Stefan Ciric
  - (France) Emmanuel Christien
  - (France) François Dumont
  - (Japan) Kotarô Fukuma
  - (Russia) Vyacheslav Gryaznov
  - (Russia) Violetta Khachikian
  - (Hong Kong) Ka Ling Colleen Lee
  - (South Korea) Hyo Sun Lim
  - (China) Wu Muye
  - (Japan) Akiko Nikami
  - (Japan) Yuma Osaki
  - (Italy) Shizuka Susanna Salvemini
  - (Russia) Anastasya Terenkova
  - (China) Jue Wang
  - (Russia) Andrey Yaroshinsky
  - (Hong Kong) (Canada) Avan Yu
  - (China) Yubo Zhou
  - (China) Zuo Zhang

=== Second round ===
July 29-August 1, 16:00-23:00. Palacio de Festivales, Sala Pereda. Recital + Chamber music (quintet).

  - (Ukraine) Alina Artemyeva
  - (Belgium) Lucas Blondeel
  - (Serbia) Stefan Ciric
  - (France) Emmanuel Christien
  - (Japan) Kotarô Fukuma
  - (Hong Kong) Ka Ling Colleen Lee
  - (South Korea) Hyo Sun Lim
  - (China) Wu Muye
  - (Italy) Shizuka Susanna Salvemini
  - (China) Jue Wang
  - (Russia) Andrey Yaroshinsky
  - (Hong Kong) (Canada) Avan Yu

=== Semi-finals ===
August 3–4, 21:00. Palacio de Festivales, Sala Argenta. Mozart piano concerto.

  - (Japan) Kotarô Fukuma
  - (Hong Kong) Ka Ling Colleen Lee
  - (Russia) Shizuka Susanna Salvemini
  - (China) Jue Wang
  - (Russia) Andrey Yaroshinsky
  - (Hong Kong) (Canada) Avan Yu

Real Philharmonía de Galicia. Juanjo Mena, conductor.

=== Final ===
August 6. Palacio de Festivales, Sala Argenta. Symphonic piano concerto.

  - (Italy) Shizuka Susanna Salvemini
  - (China) Jue Wang
  - (Hong Kong) (Canada) Avan Yu

Dresden Philharmonic. Rafael Frühbeck de Burgos, conductor.

  - First Prize: Jue Wang
  - Second Prize: Avan Yu
  - Third Prize: Shizuka Susanna Salvemini
  - Audience Prize: Avan Yu

== See also ==
- Paloma O'Shea International Piano Competition
