= Xiang-Dong Kong =

Chinese pianist

- 孔祥東
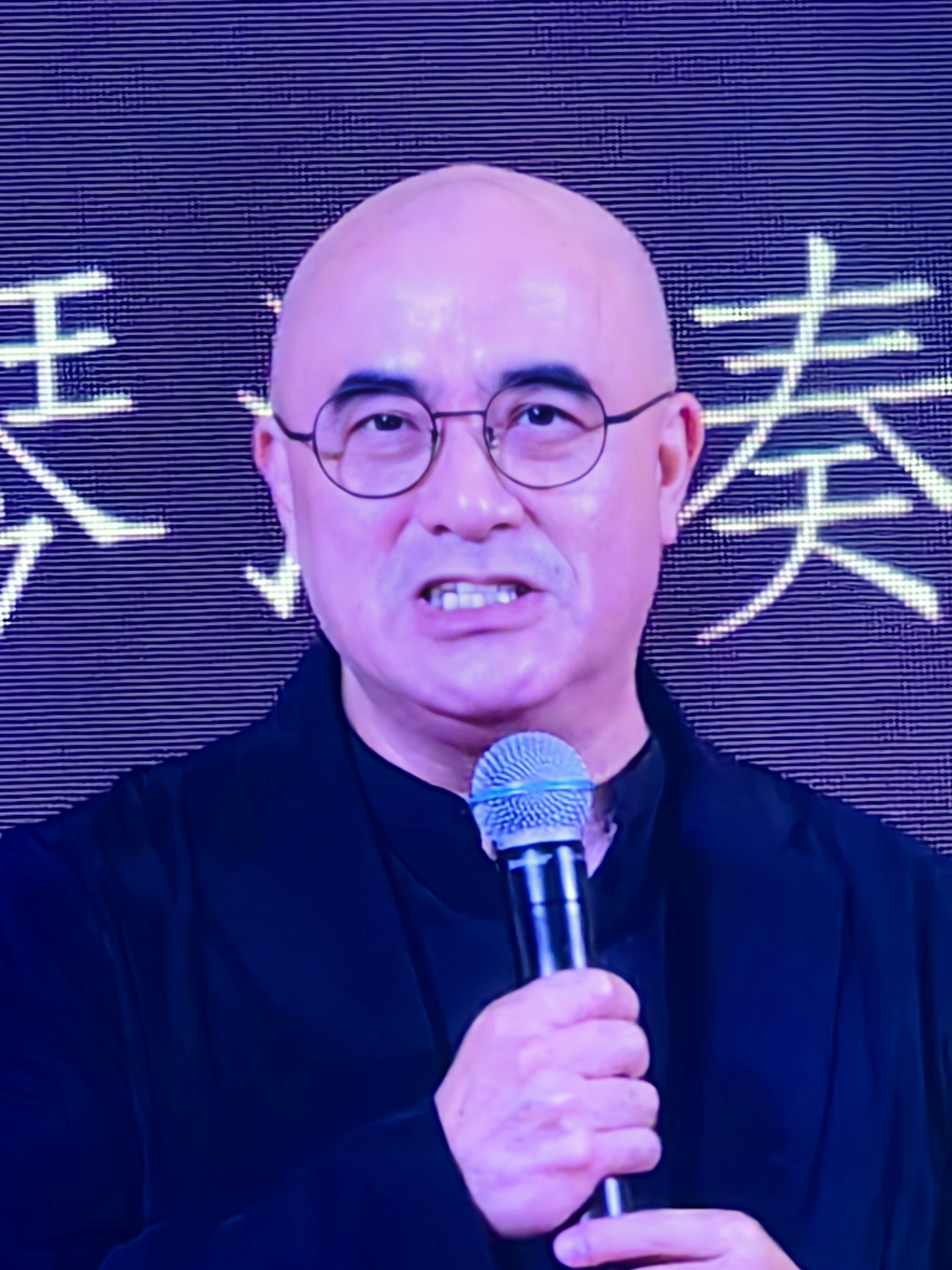
- Kong in 2025
- Born: October 22, 1966 (age 60); Shanghai, China
- Occupation: Pianist

Xiang-Dong Kong (Chinese: 孔祥東 born 22 October 1966, in Shanghai) is a Chinese pianist. He was one of the young musicians featured in From Mao to Mozart: Isaac Stern in China.

Kong was Gold Medalist at the 1988 Gina Bachauer International Piano Competition. In 1992 he won the Sydney International Piano Competition. He is a 75th descendant of Confucius.

Record of prizes
Year	Competition	Prize	Ex-aequo with...	1st prize winner	References
1986	(Soviet Union) International Tchaikovsky Competition, Moscow	7th Prize		(Northern Ireland) Barry Douglas	Tchaikovsky IMC
1987	(Spain) Paloma O'Shea International Piano Competition, Santander	4th Prize	(Soviet Union) Pavel Nersessian	(United States) David Allen Wehr	El País, 1988
1988	(United States) Gina Bachauer International Piano Competition	1st Prize			The New York Times, 1988
1992	(Australia) Sydney International Piano Competition	1st prize			Macau Gov.'s Cultural Institute
