= Achatz =

Achatz is a surname of German and Dutch origin. Notable people with the surname include:

- Dag Achatz (born 1942), Swedish classical pianist
- Grant Achatz (born 1974), American chef
- Chad Achatz (born 1987), American Dentist
