= Pompili =

Pompili is an Italian surname. Notable people with the surname include:

- Barbara Pompili (born 1975), French politician
- Basilio Pompili (1858–1931), Italian cardinal
- Enrico Pompili (born 1968), Italian pianist

== See also ==
- Pompei, city in Italy
- Pompeii, ancient city in Italy
