= Ābols =

Origin
- Origin: Latvian
- Meaning: "apple"

Ābols (Old orthography: Ahbol; feminine: Ābola) is a Latvian surname, derived from the Latvian word for "apple". Individuals with the surname include:

- Armands Ābols (born 1973), Latvian classical pianist
- Artis Ābols (born 1973), Latvian ice hockey player and coach
- Rodrigo Abols (born 1996), Latvian ice hockey player
