= Mariana Gurkova =

Bulgarian pianist

Mariana Dimitrova Gurkova-Franco (Bulgarian: Марияна Димитрова Гуркова-Франко) is a Bulgarian pianist, born in Sofia. Gurkova, who nowadays is a naturalised Spanish citizen, settled in Madrid in 1988. A former head professor at Badajoz's Conservatory, she is a teacher at Madrid's Real Conservatorio Superior.

Record of piano prizes, incomplete
Year	Competition	Prize	1st prize winner	Ex-aequo with...
1985	(Italy) VI Ettore Pozzoli, Seregno	2nd prize	(Hungary) Klára Würtz	
1989	(Spain) I Jacinto e Inocencio Guerrero	1st prize		
1989	(Spain) XXXII Premio de Jaén	2nd prize	(Germany) Martin Zehn	
1990	(Spain) X Paloma O'Shea, Santander	Semifinalist diploma	1st prize void	
1992	(Spain) XI Paloma O'Shea, Santander	Finalist prize	(Uzbekistan) Eldar Nebolsin	
1992	(Spain) VIII José Iturbi, Valencia	3rd prize	1st prize void.	
