= Luis Fernando Pérez =

Spanish classical pianist

Luis Fernando Pérez (born 1977 in Madrid, Spain) is a Spanish classical pianist.

He first studied piano at Pozuelo de Alarcón conservatoire where he received top grades. In 1993, he entered the Reina Sofía School of Music where he studied with renowned Dmitri Bashkirov, Galina Eguiazarova and chamber music with Márta Gulyás. Then he moved to the Cologne University of Music to continue his training with Pierre-Laurent Aimard.

He has recorded several albums and performed in myriad stages around the US, Japan and Europe.

He has received several awards including the Franz Liszt Prize at the IBLA International Competition, the Alicia de Larrocha Award and the Albéniz Medal for his recording of Albéniz’s Iberia.

In August 2011, at the Chambord Festival in France. In November 2024, he gave a recital during the 12th Shenzhen Piano Music Festival in China. He is regarded by Gramophone Magazine as “one of the four mythical” (together with those of Esteban Sanchez, Alicia de Larrocha and Rafael Orozco).

== Awards ==
- The Franz Liszt (Italy)
- The Granados Prize-Alicia de Larrocha prize (Barcelona)
- The Albeniz Medall (For outstanding interpretation of Iberia)
