= LVII Maria Canals International Music Competition =

International music competition

The LVII Maria Canals International Music Competition took place in Barcelona, Spain from March 19 to April 1, 2011. It was won by Mateusz Borowiak, who followed the steps of Andrzej Jasinski (1960) and Piotr Machnik (2004) as the third Polish pianist to win the competition. Russian pianists Alexey Lebedev and Alexey Chernov were awarded the 2nd and 3rd prize respectively, the former winning also the Audience Prize.

== Jury ==
  - (Uruguay) Carlos Cebro (president)
  - (Spain) Maite Berrueta
  - (France) Hervé Billaut
  - (Germany) Thomas Böckheler
  - (England) Ian Hobson
  - (South Korea) Yangsok Lee
  - (United States) David Lively
  - (Spain) Raquel Millàs
  - (Poland) Ewa Osińska
  - (Russia) Stanislav Pochekin
  - (Spain) Montse Brunet (secretary)

== Competition Results ==
=== First round ===
- (South Korea) Minjung Baek
- (Argentina) Juan Marcelo Balat
- (Spain) Enrique Bernaldo de Quirós
- (Russia) Tatyana Bezmenova
- (Poland) Mateusz Borowiak
- (Germany) Oliver Bunnenberg
- (Georgia (country)) Ina Charuashvili
- (China) Yunji Chen
- (South Korea) Seul-Ki Cheon
- (Russia) Alexey Chernov
- (Switzerland) Mischa Cheung
- (Russia) Galina Christiakova
- (Georgia (country)) Irakli Chumburidze
- (South Korea) Da-Hyun Chung
- (Italy) Lorenzo Cossi
- (Spain) Fernando Cruz
- (Russia) Valentin Dmitriev
- (Russia) Ivan Drevalev
- (Poland) Stanisław Drzewiecki
- (Ecuador) David Encalada
- (Spain) Juan Carlos Fernández Nieto
- (Spain) Noelia Fernández Rodiles
- (Japan) Madoka Fukami
- (Japan) Yoshiko Furukawa
- (Netherlands) Saskia Giorgini
- (England) Melissa Gore
- (Australia) James Guan
- (Italy) Giuseppe Gullotta
- (Russia) Ekaterina Gumenyuk
- (United States) Amy Elizabeth Gustafson
- (Japan) Erika Hanada
- (France) Patrick Hemmerle
- (China) Yu-Ching Hsu
- (Japan) Katsura Irie
- (Japan) Junna Iwasaki
- (Denmark) Emil Jensen
- (South Korea) Seong-Hye Jeong
- (Spain) Irene de Juan
- (Russia) Daria Kameneva
- (Japan) Yukino Kano
- (France) Macha Kanza
- (Belarus) Kiryl Keduk
- (Russia) Nikolay Khozin
- (Russia) Denis Khusainov
- (South Korea) Joon Kim
- (South Korea) Ohnul Kim
- (South Korea) Sang-Won Kim
- (Latvia) Julia Kocina
- (Germany) Camilla Kohnken
- (Ukraine) Vasyl Kotys
- (United States) Naomi Kudo
- (Finland) Tuomas Kyyhkynen
- (Russia) Alexey Lebedev
- (South Korea) Whaeyon Lee
- (South Korea) Yumi Lee
- (Japan) Marina Mise
- (Cuba) Madarys Morgan
- (Japan) Emi Munakata
- (Russia) Margarita Muzychenko
- (Japan) Yoshihiro Nagase
- (Japan) Maasa Nakazawa
- (Syria) Riyad Nicolas
- (Japan) Natsuki Nishimoto
- (Germany) Schaghajegh Nosrati
- (Germany) Shafagh Nosrati
- (Japan) Takuya Otaki
- (France) Sophie Patey
- (Poland) Dominika Peszko
- (Estonia) Mihkel Poll
- (Russia) Marianna Prjevalskaya
- (Russia) Ilya Rashkovsky
- (Russia) Ksenia Rodionova
- (Poland) Piotr Rozanski
- (Italy) Shizuka Susanna Salvemini
- (Japan) Yuko Sano
- (Russia) Daniil Sayamov
- (Australia) Primavera Shima
- (South Korea) Shang-Eil Shin
- (Russia) Dmitri Shishkin
- (France) Guillaume Sigier
- (Brazil) Marcelo Silva
- (Russia) Stepan Simonian
- (Poland) Marian Sobula
- (China) Yang Song
- (Russia) Mikhail Sporov
- (Belarus) Olga Stezhko
- (Chile) Mahani Teave
- (China) Hui-Nien Tsai
- (China) Hung-Lin Tsai
- (Italy) Viller Valbonesi
- (Spain) Ambrosio Valero
- (Russia) Polina Ushakova
- (Russia) Georgy Voylochnikov
- (China) Lingling Wang
- (China) Mimijue Wang
- (Poland) Prmezyslaw Winnicki
- (Poland) Prmezyslaw Witek
- (South Korea) Yonghee Yang
- (China) Hao Zhu

=== Second round ===
- (Spain) Enrique Bernaldo de Quirós
- (Poland) Mateusz Borowiak
- (South Korea) Seul-Ki Cheon
- (Russia) Alexey Chernov
- (Russia) Galina Christiakova
- (Denmark) Emil Jensen
- (Russia) Daria Kameneva
- (South Korea) Joon Kim
- (Ukraine) Vasyl Kotys
- (Finland) Tuomas Kyyhkynen
- (Russia) Alexey Lebedev
- (Japan) Takuya Otaki
- (Russia) Marianna Prjevalskaya
- (Russia) Ilya Rashkovsky
- (Italy) Shizuka Susanna Salvemini
- (France) Guillaume Sigier
- (Belarus) Olga Stezhko
- (Russia) Georgy Voylochnikov

=== Semifinals ===
- (Poland) Mateusz Borowiak
- (Russia) Alexey Chernov
- (Russia) Galina Christiakova
- (Russia) Daria Kameneva
- (Russia) Alexey Lebedev
- (Italy) Shizuka Susanna Salvemini

=== Final ===
Rank	Score	Av. Score	Nat.	Name
1st place, gold medalist(s)	9.58	9.53	(Poland)	Mateusz Borowiak
2nd place, silver medalist(s)	9.31	9.37	(Russia)	Alexey Lebedev
3rd place, bronze medalist(s)	8.86	9.28	(Russia)	Alexey Chernov
