= Josep Colom =

Spanish classical pianist

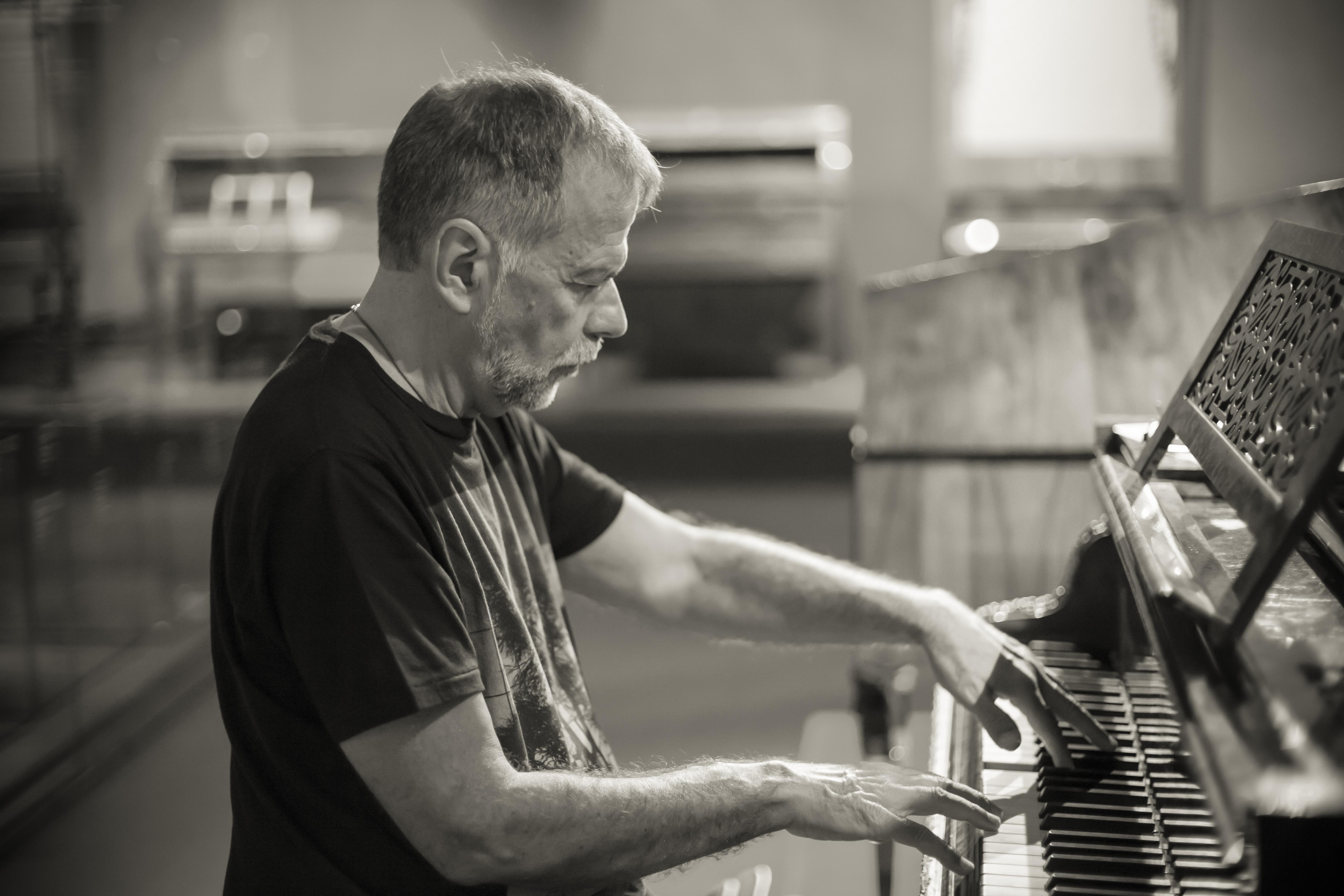
Josep Colom, pianist

Josep Colom (born 11 January 1947) is a Spanish classical pianist.

== Biography and career ==
Colom was born in Barcelona, Spain. He began piano lessons in Barcelona with his aunt Rosa Colom, and later moved to Paris to study at the École Normale de Musique. His many awards include First Prize at the first ever Santander National Piano Competition (1972) and subsequently, the Paloma O'Shea Santander International Piano Competition (1978) and First Prize at the Jaén and Épinal International Competitions. Since his debut at the Théâtre des Champs Elysées in Paris in 1979, he has regularly toured the five continents giving recitals and concerts with orchestras and performing chamber music with a wide variety of ensembles and artists.

He made his first recordings in 1982 with the complete Sonatas of Manuel Blasco de Nebra (Etnos), for which he was awarded the Spanish Ministry of Culture Prize. In 1989 he recorded the complete works of Manuel de Falla (Circe), an album that Fanfare magazine hailed as the best version of Falla's works. He has also recorded the complete works of Frederic Mompou, the complete concertos and variations of Johannes Brahms, as well as works by Fauré, Debussy, Ravel and Brahms in collaboration with the pianist Carmen Deleito.

Mr Colom has served as jury of many important piano competitions, including the Paloma O'Shea International Piano Competition and the International Chopin Piano Competition in Warsaw. In 1998 the Spanish Ministry of Culture awarded him the Premio Nacional de Música. Since 2010 he regularly teaches in Valencia at the Musikeon Postgraduate Programs, and gives masterclass in Spain (Aula de Música de la Universidad de Alcalá de Henares), Switzerland (Cours International de Blonay) and France (École Normale de Musique de Paris), among others.
