= Jue Wang =

Chinese pianist

Jue Wang (born 5 March 1984, Shanghai) is a Chinese pianist.

Entirely trained in his homeland, Wang has met much success in the Spanish piano competitions, being awarded 1st prizes both in Barcelona's 51st Maria Canals and 16th Paloma O'Shea Santander International Piano Competition competitions.
