= Galina Eguiazarova =

Russian pianist and professor

Galina Eguiazarova (Russian: Галина Егиазарова, also latinized Yegiazarova) is a Russian pianist and professor.

== Biography ==
Galina Eguiazarova was born in Russia. She studied at Moscow Tchaikovsky Conservatory, where she was a disciple of Aleksandr Goldenweiser.

Since 1961 she has devoted herself to teaching, first in Moscow — at Moscow Tchaikovsky Conservatory, and later in Madrid — at the Reina Sofía School of Music (Escuela Superior de Música Reina Sofía).

She was the teacher of Maria Stembolskaya, Radu Lupu, Yelena Eckemoff, Stanislav Ioudenitch, Marina Tchebourkina, Alexey Shmitov, Arcadi Volodos, Juan Pérez Floristán, Luis Fernando Pérez, Martín García García, Chih-Han Liu, and Pierre Delignies Calderón.

In 1993 she moved to Madrid to serve as a teaching assistant of Dimitri Bashkirov at the Reina Sofía School of Music; since 2001 she has had her own class at the same institution.
