= Ruriko Kikuchi =

Japanese pianist

Ruriko Kikuchi (菊池るり子, Kikuchi Ruriko) is a Japanese pianist.

She won the first international edition of the Paloma O'Shea Santander International Piano Competition (Spain, 1974)

She shared the 1980 Concorso Busoni 2nd prize with Rolf Plagge and Hai-Kyung Suh (no 1st prize was awarded). She taught at the Osaka College of Music.
