= Maria Canals International Music Competition =

Annual classical music competition

The Maria Canals International Music Competition (Catalan: Concurs Internacional de Música Maria Canals Barcelona, IPA: [kuŋˈkuɾs intəɾnəsi.uˈnal də ˈmuzikə məˈɾi.ə kəˈnalz βəɾsəˈlonə]) is a music competition held yearly in the Palau de la Música Catalana, Barcelona. It was founded as a piano competition in 1954, but in 1964 it was expanded so other modalities could be held occasionally.

It was founded in 1954 by the Catalan pianist Maria Remei Canals i Cendrós (1913–2010) and her husband, the composer and writer Rossend Llates (1899–1973). Since 1954, the Competition has welcomed over 7,000 participants from 100 countries and 180 jury members from all over the world. It became a member of the World Federation of International Music Competitions in 1958.

The Maria Canals competition, for which artists such as Joan Miró, Antoni Tàpies and Joan Clavé have made publicity posters, was declared to be of public utility by the Spanish Interior Ministry in 1996.

== Commentaries on the competition ==
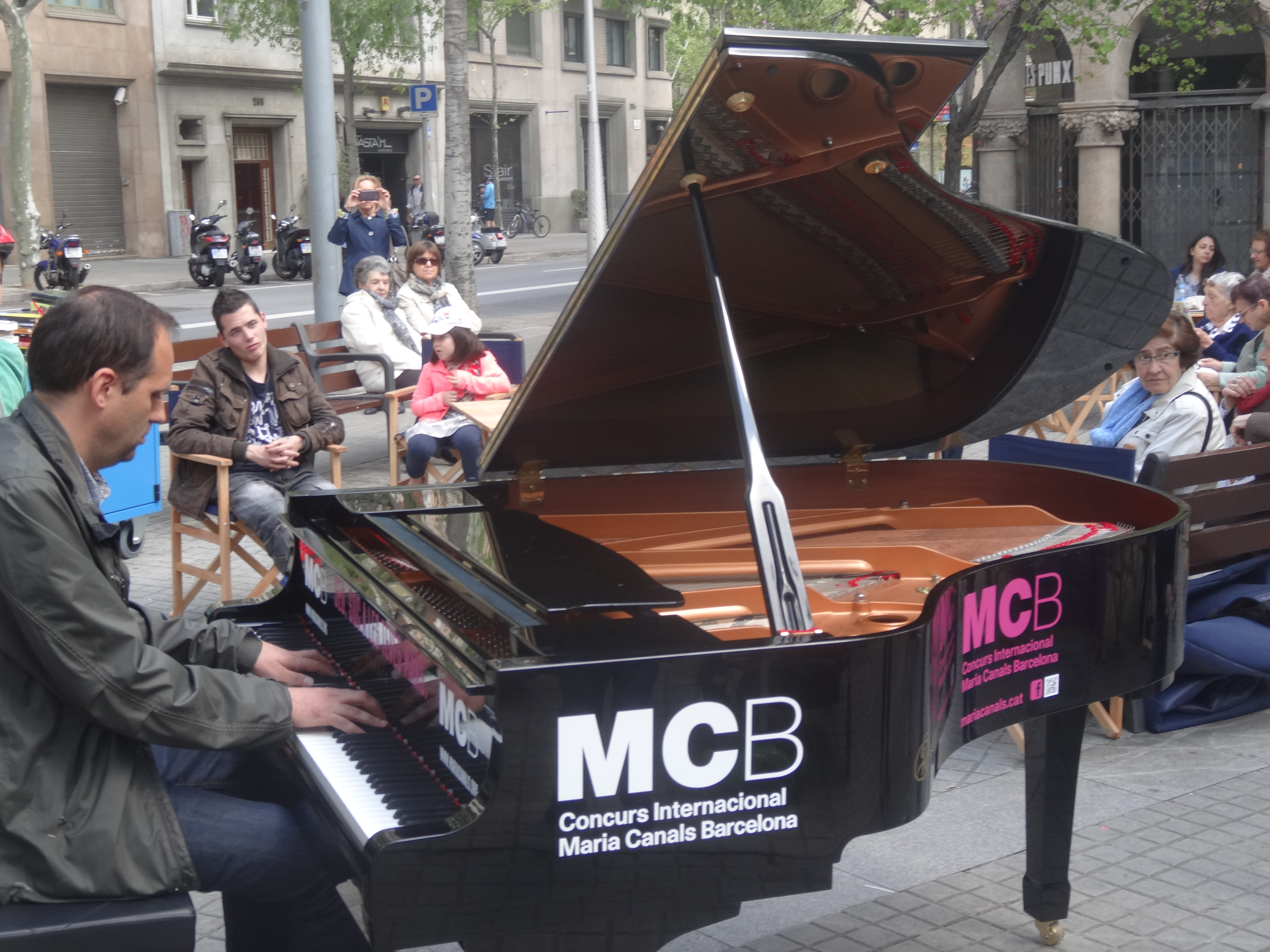
Pianist performing at Avinguda Diagonal, as part of the Maria Canals competition event in 2015.

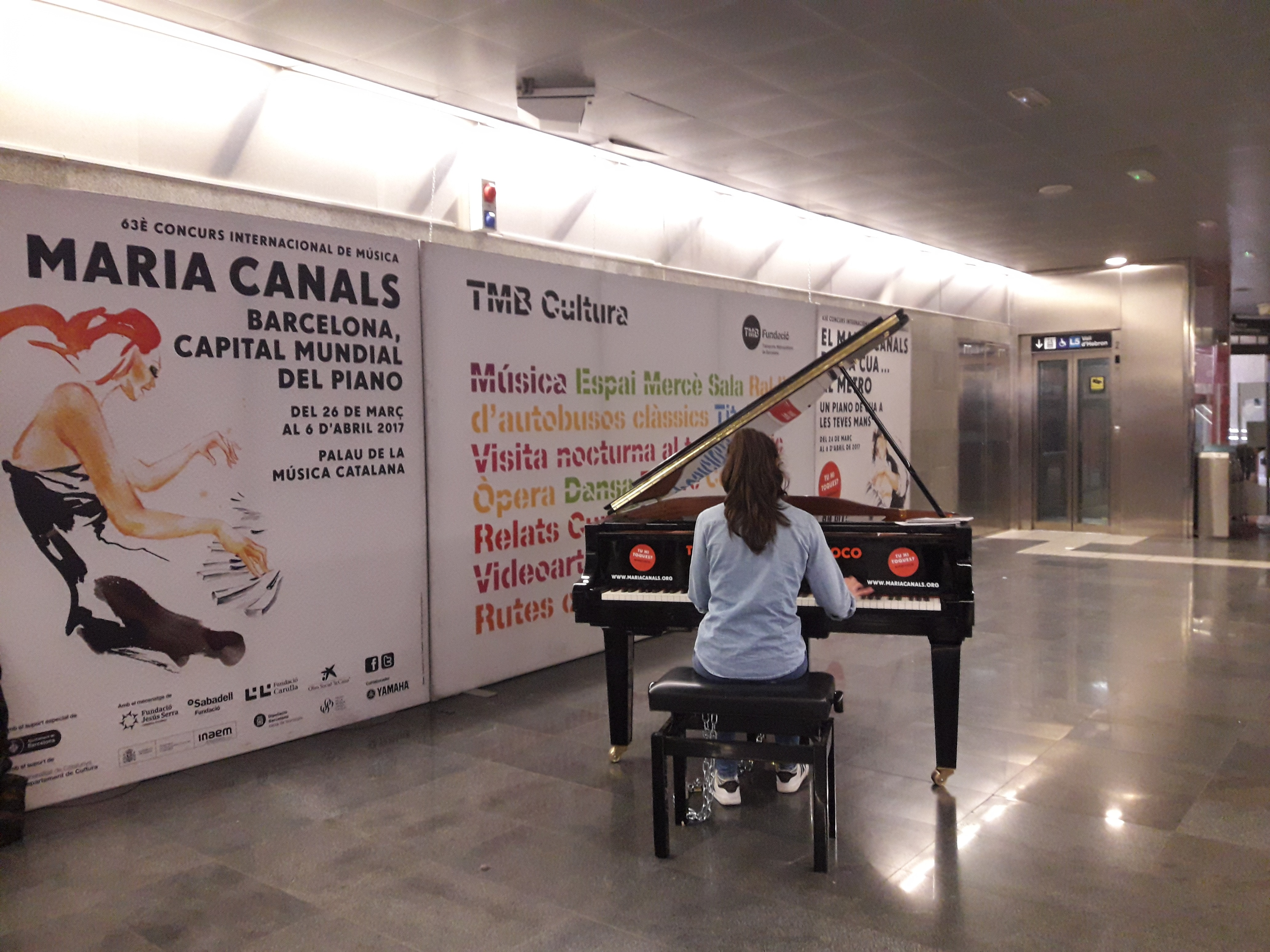
Pianist performing at Diagonal metrostation, as part of the Maria Canals competition event in 2017.

- Of the multitude of international piano competitions, it is comforting to note that a competition like the Maria Canals at Barcelona, in which the piano is judged purely on a musical level, in which the player cannot forget the essential thing, interpretation, that such a competition takes on greater importance every year. Musicians can only praise and thank Maria Canals for her initiative. For my part, I can only warmly salute not only the longevity of this competition, but its ever more important participation in that magnificent combat in which, nobly and with exemplary probity, the artists of the future – those who will pick up the baton from their elders – face each other. – Vlado Perlemuter, 1964.
- Those of us who follow the Barcelonan musical life can't forget the ascendant evolution of the Maria Canals International Music Competition, initiated in 1954, which has turned into one of the most important European competitions. In celebrating its 40th anniversary we can state that many performers of the highest level have arisen from the competition, such a thing having contributed to expand the prestige of Barcelona as an artistic city. – Xavier Montsalvatge, 2004.

== Prize Winners ==
Piano
1954	1st prize (men)	1st prize (women)		
	(Spain) Miquel Farré Mallofré	(Spain) Maria Neus Miró Gumà		
1956	Grand prize	1st prize (men) (ex-a.)	1st prize (women) (ex-a.)	
	Not awarded	(West Germany) Klaus Börner	(Switzerland) Aline Demierre	
		(Italy) Giorgio Radicula	(Spain) Núria Escofet Manich	
1957	Grand prize	1st prize (men)	1st prize (women)	
	Not awarded	(Italy) Alberto Colombo	(France) Thérèse Castaigne	
1958	1st prize			
	(France) Françoise Thinat			
1959	1st prize	2nd prize (men)	2nd prize (women)	
	Not awarded	(Switzerland) Jean-Jacques Hauser	(Japan) Yoko Ikeda	
1960	1st prize			
	(Poland) Andrzej Jasiński			
1961	1st prize			
	(France) Catherine Silie			
1962	1st prize			
	(Uruguay) Dinorah Varsi			
1963	1st prize	2nd prize (men)	2nd prize (women)	
	Not awarded	(Poland) Jerzy Gajek	(France) Françoise Parrot	
1964	1st prize			
	(Sweden) Dag Achatz			
1965	1st prize			
	(United States) James Tocco			
1966	1st prize			
	(Spain) Leonora Milà Romeu			
1967	1st prize	2nd prize (ex-a.)		
	Not awarded	(Italy) Franco Angeleri		
		(France) Jacques Rouvier		
1968	1st prize			
	(Argentina) Christina Viñas			
1969	1st prize			
	(United States) Joseph W. Fennimore			
1970	1st prize	2nd prize		
	(Mexico) Guadalupe Parrondo	(United Kingdom) Martin Hughes		
1971	1st prize	2nd prize (ex-a.)		
	Not awarded	(Poland) Ewa Bukojemska		
		(France) Yves Noack		
1972	1st prize			
	(Hungary) Klára Barányi			
1973	1st prize			
	(United States) Jonathan M. Purvin			
1974	1st prize	2nd prize by unanimity	2nd prize (ex-a.)	
	Not awarded	(Socialist Federal Republic of Yugoslavia) Blanca Bodalla	(Japan) Akira Imai	
			(France) Pierre Réach	
1975	1st prize	2nd prize (men) (ex-a.)	2nd prize (women)	
	Not awarded	(Italy) Raimondo Campisi	(United States) Marioaran Trifan	
		(Italy) Roberto Capello		
		(Italy) Andrea Bonatta		
1976	1st prize	2nd prize		
	(Japan) Yasuto Sugimoto	(Poland) Elza Kolodin		
1977	1st prize	2nd prize (ex-a.)	3rd prize	
	(West Germany) Arnulf von Arnim	(South Korea) Chung-Myung Kim	(Argentina) Silvia Natiello	
		(Israel) Carmen Or		
1978	1st prize	2nd prize	3rd prize	
	(France) Bernard d'Ascoli	(France) Erik Berchot	(Japan) Ruriko Kikuchi	
1979	1st prize	2nd prize (ex-a.)	3rd prize	
	Not awarded	(France) Yves Rault	(Italy) Mario Bosselli	
		(Hungary) Christine Kiss		
1980	1st prize	2nd prize	3rd prize	
	(Soviet Union) Yuri Rozum	(France) Catherine Joly	(Hungary) Akos Hernadi	
1981	1st prize	2nd prize (ex-a.)	3rd prize	
	Not awarded	(Japan) Kazuoki Fujii	(Brazil) José Carlos Cocarelli	
		(France) Michel Gal		
1982	1st prize	2nd prize	3rd prize	
	(Japan) Hiromi Okada	(Hungary) Karoly Mocsari	(Japan) Yuki Matsuzawa	
1983	1st prize	2nd prize (ex-a.)	3rd prize	Special prize
	Not awarded	(West Germany) Bernd Glemser	(Italy) Antonella Vignali	(Spain) Marcelino López Domínguez
		(Japan) Kyoko Koyama		
1984	1st prize	2nd prize (ex-a.)	3rd prize	
	Not awarded	(Japan) Rie Konishi	(Bulgaria) Galina Vratcheva	
		(France) Pascal Le Corre		
1985	1st prize	2nd prize (ex-a.)	3rd prize	
	Not awarded	(West Germany) Detlef Kaiser	(Romania) Constantin Sandu	
		(Australia) Ian Munro		
1986	1st prize	2nd prize	3rd prize	Special prize
	(Japan) Chiharu Sakai	(France) Carole Carniel	(Japan) Nobuyuki Nagaoka	(Spain) Ignacio Marín Bocanegra
1987	1st prize	2nd prize	3rd prize (ex-a.)	
	Not awarded	(United Kingdom) Christopher Oakden	(Japan) Keiko Nakai	
			(France) Alexandre Tharaud	
1988	1st prize	2nd prize	3rd prize	Special prize
	(China) Zhong Xu	(France) Olivier Cazal	(Japan) Junko Saito	(Spain) José Ramón Méndez Menéndez
1989	1st prize	2nd prize	3rd prize	Special prize
	(Argentina) Gerardo Vila	(France) Christophe Simonet	(Japan) Yukiko Hori	(Spain) Miquel Jorba Picañol
1990	1st prize	2nd prize	3rd prize (ex-a.)	
	(France) Mathieu Papadiamandis	Not awarded	(Philippines) Jovianney E. Cruz	
			(Soviet Union) Andrei Fadeev	
1991	1st prize	2nd prize	3rd prize	
	(Soviet Union) Yuri Martinov	(Japan) Yuko Nakamichi	(Germany) Eva-Maria Rieckert	
1992	1st prize	2nd prize	3rd prize	
	(Latvia) Armands Ābols	(Japan) Akiko Kato	(Japan) Tomoko Doi	
1993	1st prize	2nd prize	3rd prize	
	(Israel) Amir Katz	(Spain) Gustavo Díaz-Jerez	(Poland) Rafal Luszczewski	
1994	1st prize	2nd prize	3rd prize (ex-a.)	
	(Russia) Sviatoslav Lips	(Belarus) Dmitri Morozov	(France) Frederik Lagarde	
			(Japan) Johko Takemura	
1995	1st prize	2nd prize	3rd prize (ex-a.)	
	(South Korea) Won Kim	(Japan) Keiji Serizawa	(Russia) Yulia Botchkovskaia	
			(Germany) Birgita Wollenweber	
1996	1st prize	2nd prize	3rd prize (ex-a.)	
	Not awarded	(Germany) Jan Gottlieb Jiracek	(Israel) Saar Ahuvia	
			(Japan) Kiyo Wada	
1997	1st prize	2nd prize (ex-a.)	3rd prize	Special prize
	Not awarded	(Japan) Elina Hata	(Canada) Li Wang	(South Korea) Young-Ha Chung
		(Japan) Ayako Kawai		
1998	1st prize	2nd prize	3rd prize (ex-a.)	Special prize
	(Hungary) Peter Koczor	(Japan) Takahiro Mita	(Japan) Miwako Takeda	(France) Vincent Larderet
			(United Kingdom) Anthony Zerpa-Falcon	
1999	1st prize	2nd prize	3rd prize	
	(Russia) Kirill Gerstein	(Japan) Ayako Kimura	(South Korea) Sung-Hoon Hwang	
2000	1st prize	2nd prize	3rd prize (ex-a.)	
	(Japan) Yusuke Kikuchi	(Romania) Ferenc Vizi	(Poland) Piotr Kupka	
			(France) Fabrice Lanoë	
2001	1st prize	2nd prize (ex-a.)	3rd prize	
	(Japan) Yurie Miura	(United Kingdom) Mel Adkins	(Japan) Mayako Asada	
		(Russia) Ekaterina Krivokochenko		
2002	1st prize	2nd prize (ex-a.)	3rd prize	
	(United Kingdom) Viv McLean	(Russia) Alexandre Moutouzkine	(Taiwan) Yun-Yang Lee	
		(South Korea) Kook Hee Hong		
2003	1st prize	2nd prize	3rd prize	
	(Ukraine) (Israel) Inesa Synkevich	(Japan) Yosuke Niino	(South Korea) Sowon Hwang	
2004	1st prize	2nd prize	3rd prize	
	(Poland) Piotr Machnik	(Taiwan) Yi-Chih Lu	(Romania) Matei Varga	
2005	1st prize	2nd prize	3rd prize	
	(China) Jue Wang	(Japan) Yukiko Akagi	(Japan) Fumiyo Kawamura	
2006	1st prize	2nd prize	3rd prize	
	(Spain) José Enrique Bagaría Villazán	(France) Marie Vermeulin	(New Zealand) Mi-Yeon I	
2007	1st prize	2nd prize (ex-a.)		
	(Serbia) Mladen Čolić	(Czech Republic) Veronika Böhmova	(United States) Marisa Gupta	
2008	1st prize	2nd prize	3rd prize	
	(Croatia) Martina Filjak	(Russia) Ilya Maksimov	(Japan) Jun Ishimura	
2009	1st prize	2nd prize	3rd prize	
	(Latvia) Vestards Šimkus	(South Korea) Jong Yun Kim	(Italy) Scipione Sangiovanni	
2010	1st prize	2nd prize	3rd prize	
	(Ukraine) Denis Zhdanov	(Russia) Olga Kozlova	(Finland) Marko Hilpo	
2011	1st prize	2nd prize	3rd prize	
	(Poland) Mateusz Borowiak	(Russia) Alexey Lebedev	(Russia) Alexey Chernov	
2012	1st prize	2nd prize	3rd prize	
	(South Korea) Soo Jung Ann	(Japan) Nozomi Nakagiri	(Ukraine) Vadym Kholodenko	
2013	1st prize	2nd prize	3rd prize	
	(Ukraine) (Russia) Stanislav Khristenko	(Japan) Tomoaki Yoshida	(South Korea) Haejae Kim	
2014	1st prize	2nd prize	3rd prize	
	(Ukraine) Regina Chernychko	(Russia) Sergey Belyavskiy	(Russia) Tatiana Chernichka	
2015	1st prize	2nd prize	3rd prize	
	(Ukraine) Danylo Saienko	(South Korea) Minsung Lee	(Germany) Caterina Grewe	
2016	1st prize	2nd prize	3rd prize	
	(Japan) Hiroo Sato	(Japan) Shiori Kuwahara	(China) Yutong Sun	
2017	1st prize	2nd prize	3rd prize	
	(Armenia) Levon Avagyan	(Hong Kong) Hit Yat Tsang	(Canada) Anastasia Rizikov	
2018	1st prize	2nd prize	3rd prize	
	(Russia) Evgeny Konnov	(United Kingdom) Luke Jones	(Russia) Alexey Sychev	
2019	1st prize	2nd prize	3rd prize	
	(Latvia) Daumants Liepinš	(Russia) Aleksandr Klyuchko	(Hong Kong) Ka Jeng Wong	
2021	1st prize	2nd prize	3rd prize	
	(Georgia (country)) Sandro Gegechkor	(China) Ziming Ren	(Portugal) Rafael Kyrychenko	
2022	1st prize	2nd prize	3rd prize	
	(Canada) Jaeden Izik-Dzurko	(China) Antonio Chen Guang	(Japan) Masaya Kamei	
2023	1st prize	2nd prize	3rd prize	
	(United States) Jonathan Mamora	(Russia) Valentin Malinin	(Ukraine) Roman Lopatynskyi	
2024	1st prize	2nd prize	3rd prize	
	(China) Xiaolu Zang	(Belarus) Uladzislau Khandohi	(Hong Kong) Chung Lam U	
2025	1st prize	2nd prize	3rd prize	
	(United States) Curtis Phill Hsu	(Slovenia) Nejc Kamplet	(Taiwan) Pin-Hong Lin	

Chamber Music (1970–87) and Duo-Sonatas (1996 and later)
1970	1st prize		
	(Spain) Fernando Puchol and Pedro León		
1973	1st prize	2nd prize by unanimity	
	Not awarded	(West Germany) Dieter Lallinger and Jürgen Besig	
1980	1st prize	2nd prize	3rd prize
	(West Germany) Roland Straumer and Olaf Dressler	(Japan) Izumi Komoriya and Taisuko Yamashita	(Spain) Juan Llinares and (Italy) Ludovica Mosca
1987	1st prize	2nd prize	3rd prize
	(East Germany) Michael Sanderling and Gerald Fauth	(Japan) Senoko Numata and Akemi Tadenuma	(France) Pierre Luc Denuit and Sylvie Barret
1996	1st prize	2nd prize	3rd prize
	(United States) Avi Downes and Shana Downes	(Japan) Aya Yoshii and Yoko Yoshihara	(Russia) Maria Belousova and (Poland) Katarzyna Ewald
1999	1st prize	2nd prize	3rd prize (ex-a.)
	(Germany) Florian Wiek and Justus Grimm	(Japan) Akiko Okabe and Yuko Aragaki	(Germany) Isabel Gabbe and (France) Leslie Riva
			(Japan) Kyoko Sasaki and Eriko Iso
2004	1st prize	2nd prize	3rd prize (ex-a.)
	(South Korea) Eung Soo Kim and Moon Young Chae	(Belarus) Igor Bobowitsch and (Ukraine) Elena Kolesnichenko	(France) Julien Beaudiment and Laetitia Bougnol
			(Spain) Katia Novell and (Venezuela) Luis Parés

Flute
1968	1st prize	2nd prize (ex-a.)		
	Not awarded	(France) Lô Angelloz		
		(Switzerland) Teresita Frey		
1972	1st prize	2nd prize (ex-a.)		
	Not awarded	(France) Christine Turellier		
		(West Germany) Edelgard Seeman		
1978	1st prize	2nd prize (ex-a.)	3rd prize	
	Not awarded	(Japan) Masayoshi Enokida	(Poland) Jadwiga Kotnowska	
		(France) Philippe Pierlot		
1983	1st prize	2nd prize	3rd prize	Special Prize
	(Hungary) Erika Sebök	(Japan) Motoaki Kato	(Hungary) Monika Hegedüs	(Spain) Vicenç Prats
1988	1st prize	2nd prize (ex-a.)	3rd prize	
	(Soviet Union) Dita Krenberga	(France) Christel Rayneau	(Soviet Union) Natalia Setchkareva	
		(Hungary) Iren More		
1994	1st prize	2nd prize	3rd prize	
	(Russia) Natalia Danilina	(Japan) Atsuko Koga	(France) Maryse Graciet	
1998	1st prize	2nd prize	3rd prize (ex-a.)	
	(Russia) Olesia Tertychnaia	(Italy) Christian Farroni	(Japan) Kaori Fujii	
			(Federal Republic of Yugoslavia) Dejan Gavric	
2001	1st prize	2nd prize	3rd prize	
	(Italy) Francesca Canali	(South Korea) Hyun-im Yoon	(Austria) Petra Orgl	

Guitar
1969	1st prize	2nd prize	
	Not awarded	(West Germany) Wolfgang Lendle	
1974	1st prize	2nd prize	3rd prize
	(France) Marie Thérèse Ghirardi	(Brazil) Dagoberto Linhares	(Socialist Federal Republic of Yugoslavia) Dušan Bogdanović
1979	1st prize	2nd prize	3rd prize
	(Uruguay) Leonardo Palacios	(United Kingdom) William Waters	(Spain) Guillermo Pérez
1981	1st prize	2nd prize	3rd prize
	(Spain) Gabriel García Santos	(Japan) Shin-Ichi Fukuda	(Australia) Nicholas Petrou
1985	1st prize	2nd prize	3rd prize
	(Italy) Stefano Cardi	(Netherlands) Han Jonkers	(Japan) Keiko Fujii
1989	1st prize	2nd prize	3rd prize
	(Netherlands) Esther-Helena Steenbergen	(Socialist Federal Republic of Yugoslavia) István Römer	(Soviet Union) Vladimir Tervo
1992	1st prize	2nd prize	3rd prize
	(Bulgaria) George Vassilev	(Spain) Xavier Coll	(Japan) Daisuke Suzuki
1997	1st prize	2nd prize	3rd prize
	(Italy) Sara Gianfelici	(Italy) Lorenzo Micheli	(South Korea) Daekun Jang

Percussion
1982	1st prize	2nd prize (ex-a.)	3rd prize	Special prize (ex-a.)
	Not awarded	(West Germany) Axel Fries	(Japan) Shin-ichi Ueno	(Spain) Jordi Mestres
		(West Germany) Peter Sadlo		(Spain) Santiago Molas
1990	1st prize	2nd prize (ex-a.)	3rd prize	
	(Spain) Ramón Alsina	(Germany) Armin Weigert	(Germany) Stefan Eblenkamp	
		(Spain) Ignasi Vila		

Trio
2009	1st prize	2nd prize	3rd prize
	Trio Demian	Trio Quintillian	Trio Monte

Violin
1964	1st prize			
	(Argentina) Rubén González			
1967	1st prize			
	(Belgium) Edith Volckaert			
1971	1st prize			
	(Austria) Ernst Kovacic			
1975	1st prize	2nd prize		
men	(Portugal) Gerardo Ribeiro	(Romania) Eugen Sârbu		
women	(Japan) Yukari Tate	(Mexico) Rasma Liélmane		
1979	1st prize	2nd prize	3rd prize	
	Not awarded	(Belgium) Véronique Bogaerts	(France) Berthilde Dufour	
1984	1st prize	2nd prize	3rd prize (ex-a.)	Special Prize
	(France) Stéphane L. Picard	Not awarded	(Poland) Danuta Glowacka	(Spain) Joaquín Palomares
			(United States) Mark Bleck	
1989	1st prize	2nd prize (ex-a.)	3rd prize (ex-a.)	
	Not awarded	(West Germany) Franziska Pietsch	(East Germany) Thomas Bötcher	
		(Bulgaria) Yova Slessareva	(Japan) Kyoko Saburi	
1993	1st prize	2nd prize	3rd prize	
	(Bulgaria) Denitsa Kazakova	(Japan) Ryotaro Ito	(Germany) Olga Nodel	

Violoncello
1976	1st prize	2nd prize	
	(France) Daniel Raclot	(Brazil) Antônio Meneses	
1986	1st prize	2nd prize	3rd prize
	(Israel) Hillel Zori	(Italy) Luca Signorini	Not awarded
1991	1st prize	2nd prize	3rd prize (ex-a.)
	(France) Valérie Aimard	(France) Anita Barbereau	(France) Laure Vavasseur
			(Germany) Thorsten Encke

Voice
1965	1st prize	2nd prize		
	Not awarded	Not awarded		
1966	1st prize			
	(Austria) Wolfgang Witte			
1967	1st prize			
	(West Germany) Dirk Schortemeier			
1968	1st prize			
	(Romania) Ionel Pantea			
1969	1st prize	2nd prize (ex-a.)		
	Not awarded	(Japan) Kiyoko Ishii		
		(West Germany) Roswitha Haub		
1971	1st prize			
	(Romania) Magdalena Cononovici			
1972	1st prize	2nd prize		
	Not awarded	(Romania) Sandra Sandru		
1973	1st prize			
	(Romania) Marilena Marinescu			
1974	1st prize	2nd prize by unanimity	2nd prize (ex-a.)	
	Not awarded	(Romania) Marius Cosmescu	(Hungary) Juliana Paszthy	
			(Italy) Wally Salio	
1975	1st prize	2nd prize	3rd prize	
	(Soviet Union) Ludmila Yourchenco	(Soviet Union) Aleksandr Rudkowsky	(Soviet Union) Aleksandr Vorosilo	
1976	1st prize	2nd prize	3rd prize	
	Not awarded	Not awarded	Not awarded	
1977	1st prize	2nd prize (ex-a.)		
	Not awarded	(Romania) Károly Szilágyi		
		(Japan) Keiko Hibi		
1978	1st prize	2nd prize		
	(France) François le Roux	(Romania) Rodica Mitrica		
1979	1st prize	2nd prize	3rd prize (ex-a.)	
	Not awarded	(Hungary) Eva Tihany	(Italy) Gabriela Mazza	
			(Japan) Kuniko Taguchi	
1981	1st prize	2nd prize (ex-a.)	3rd prize	
	(United States) Nancy Carol Moore	(France) Anne Salvan	(Soviet Union) Olim Sadoullaiev	
		(Spain) Luis Álvarez Sastre		
1983	1st prize	2nd prize	3rd prize (ex-a.)	
	(Argentina) Mabel Perelstein	(United States) Jennifer Larmore	(Canada) Elise Bédard	
			(Spain) Catalina Moncloa	
1985	1st prize	2nd prize (ex-a.)	3rd prize	
	(Japan) Chihiro Bamba	(West Germany) Tomas Möwes	(Spain) Teresa Verdera	
		(East Germany) Annette K. Markert		
1987	1st prize	2nd prize (ex-a.)	3rd prize (ex-a.)	
	Not awarded	(United States) Jenny M. Miller	(Japan) Fumi Yamamoto	
		(South Korea) Jin-Ok Kim	(Romania) Teodor Ciurdea	
1990	1st prize	2nd prize	3rd prize (ex-a.)	Special prize
	(Soviet Union) Vladimir Dits	(Romania) Mirela S. Spinu	(Poland) Malgorzata Lesiewicz-Przybył	(Spain) Manuel Lanza
			(Spain) Manuel Lanza	
1995	1st prize	2nd prize	3rd prize (ex-a.)	
	(Japan) Mihoko Fujimura	(Spain) Rosa Mateu	(Iceland) Hanna Dóra Sturludóttir	
			(South Korea) Suki Kim	
2000	1st prize	2nd prize (ex-a.)	3rd prize	
	(Germany) Annette Dasch	(Romania) Ramona Eremia	Not awarded	
		(Lithuania) Giedré Povilaityté		
