= Brenno Ambrosini =

Italian pianist (born 1967)

Brenno Ambrosini is an Italian pianist, born in Veneto, who is active in Spain. In 1990, he began performing with Mark Lubotsky. After being homoured in the leading Spanish piano competitions (1988–1992), he developed a teaching career and became involved in the Spanish contemporary music scene. He has championed the piano music of Soviet contemporary composers such as Arvo Pärt, Sofia Gubaidulina, Boris Tishchenko and Alfred Schnittke, and has kept a close artistic relationship with local composers such as Francisco Llácer Pla. Since 1994, he has played in a piano duo with David Kuijken, having developed his chamber music career with the Brodsky and Pražák string quartets. He was a professor in the Conservatory of Castellón, in whose University he graduated in philosophy, and a member of the London Liszt Society. Since 2015, he has taught chamber music in the Conservatory of Castilla y León, in Salamanca.

== Prizes ==
- 1988 - Cidade do Porto. 1st prize. Beethoven Prize. Debussy Prize.
- 1988 - Jose Iturbi International Piano Competition. 2nd prize.
- 1989 - Jeunesses Musicales International Music Competition - Belgrade - Second Prize and Audience Prize
- 1990 - Paloma O'Shea Santander International Piano Competition. Finalist.
- 1992 - Jaén International Piano Competition. 1st prize, Rosa Sabater prize.
