= Edith Volckaert =

Belgian violinist (1949–1992)

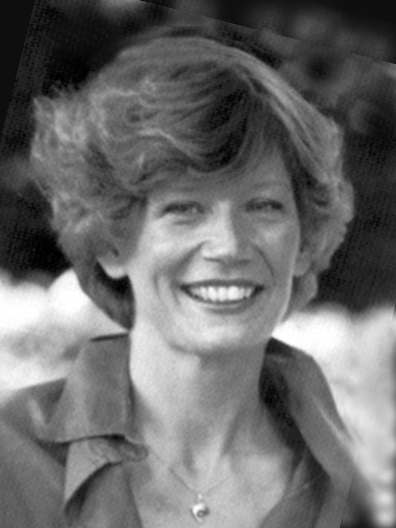
Edith Volckaert

Edith Volckaert (August 27, 1949 – July 2, 1992) was a Belgian violinist and music educator.

She was born in Ghent. By the age of four, she had already given a public performance of a Vivaldi concerto. Volckaert received private lessons from Carlo Van Neste, who was to be her only teacher. Volckaert won a number of international awards including the International Tibor Varga Violin Competition, the Mozart Competition, the UNESCO competition and the prize from the Taormina Festival in Sicily. In 1967, she placed first for violin in the Maria Canals International Music Competition. At the age of 19, she received a scholarship from the Belgian National Pro Civitate competition. In 1971, she was a prize winner in the Queen Elisabeth Competition, placing fifth in the final standings. She became a jury member for the competition in 1976.

She performed in Berlin, Moscow, Salzburg, Paris, London and the United States as a soloist and with chamber music groups. She played a violin produced during the late 17th century by a follower of Giovanni Paolo Maggini, possibly Andrea Guarneri.

Volckaert taught at the Royal Conservatory of Brussels but retired from teaching there in 1978 to devote herself to performing. She suffered from an incurable cancer for the last six years of her life but continued to teach until the last few months.
