= Krassimir Taskov =

Bulgarian pianist and composer (born c. 1955)

Krassimir Taskov (Bulgarian: Красимир Тасков) (born in Sofia, 1955) is a Bulgarian pianist and composer.

He was a prize winner at the 1978 Paloma O'Shea Piano Competition, and took second place at the 1984 UNESCO International Rostrum of Composers. Taskov is the Chairman of the Composition Department at the Sofia State Academy of Music, where he also holds a piano professorship, and a member of the Union of Bulgarian Composers.

== Selected list of works ==
- Archaic pictures for piano (1980)
- Moments Musicaux for flute, viola, harp, cembalo and strings (1982)
- Introduction and Passacaglia for string orchestra (1984)
- 1st Clarinet Concerto (1984–85)
- Concert Overture (1985)
- Night Music for clarinet, piano and percussions (1987)
- Capriccio for orchestra (1988/96)
- Fantasia for 2 pianos (1989–90)
- Transfiguration I, for 4 groups of performers (1990)
- Transfiguration II, for 2 pianos (1990)
- Violin Concerto (1992/94)
- Transfiguration III, for 14 string instruments (1993)
- Triptych for piano four-hands (1994)
- Oboe Concerto (1994/95)
- Mutuality I for flute and harpsichord (1997)
- Transfiguration IV, for symphony orchestra (1997)
- 2nd Clarinet Concerto (2002)
- Dythirambs II for 9 performers (2003)
