= Alexander Romanovsky (pianist) =

Ukrainian classical pianist

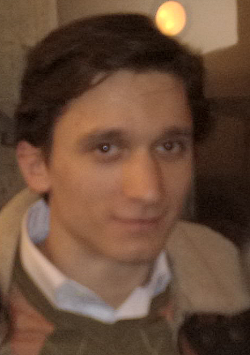
- Born: August 21, 1984 (age 41); Dniprodzerzhinsk, Ukrainian SSR, Soviet Union
- Occupation: classical pianist

Alexander Alexandrovich Romanovsky (Russian: Александр Александрович Романовский; Ukrainian: Олександр Олександрович Романовський, romanized: Oleksandr Oleksandrovych Romanovskyi; born 21 August 1984) is a Ukrainian-born classical pianist resident in Italy. Romanovsky self-identifies as Russian while performing in Russia, and in the Russian-occupied Ukrainian territories.

== Biography ==
Romanovsky was born in Dniprodzerzhinsk, in the Ukrainian SSR of the Soviet Union (now Kamianske in Ukraine). He studied in Kharkiv.

Romanovsky appeared at age 11 with the Moscow Virtuosi under Vladimir Spivakov. His piano teacher was Leonid Margarius, a pupil of Regina Horowitz, sister of pianist Vladimir Horowitz. In 1996 he was awarded the Grand Prix at the Vladimir Krainev International Young Pianists Competition (in Ukraine). At the age of seventeen (2001) he won First Prize at the Ferruccio Busoni International Piano Competition. As his teacher Margarius moved to Italy to teach at the “Accademia pianistica di Imola”, Romanovsky moved to Italy to continue his studies with him. Romanovsky graduated from the Academy in 2007 with a master's degree. He also studied under pianist Dimitri Alexeev at the Royal College of Music in London, England, graduating with an "Artist's Diploma" upon completing his studies there in 2008.

Romanovsky has taught at the Royal College of Music (RCM) and at the Conservatorio di Reggio Emilia. In the summer of 2022, Romanovsky was suspended from his position as professor at the RCM, following his playing a street recital in front of the bombed-out Donetsk Academic Regional Drama Theater in Mariupol in the presence of Russian video cameras, and following an interview given to Russian media alongside his collaborator, the Russian violinist Petr Lundstrem, a supporter of the 2022 Russian invasion of Ukraine.

== Discography ==
Winner Recital (Busoni Competition)
(CD | CDX25245) – 2001 - Divox
- Music by Bach-Busoni, Haydn, Chopin, Liszt, Ligeti, Prokofiev

Schumann, Brahms
(CD | 476 6208 DH DDD) – 2007 - Decca Records
- Robert Schumann - Symphonic Etudes op. 13
- Johannes Brahms - Variations on a Theme by Paganini op. 35

Rachmaninov
(CD | 476 3334 DH DDD) – 2009 - Decca Records
- Sergej Vasil'evič Rachmaninov - 9 Etudes-Tableaux, Op. 39
- Sergej Vasil'evič Rachmaninov - Variations on a theme by Corelli, Op. 42

Piano Gold - 63 brani celebri in box dorato (interpreti vari)
(CD | 480 3631 GB3 ADD) – 2010 - Deutsche Grammophon
- Sergej Vasil'evič Rachmaninov - Etudes-Tableaux op.39: n. 3 in do min. (traccia 36)

Beethoven
(CD | 476 4151 DH DDD) – 2010 - Decca Records
- Ludwig van Beethoven - Variazioni per pianoforte op. 120 (Variazioni Diabelli)

Glazunov
(CD | 0825646794652) – 2011 - Warner Classics
- Aleksandr Konstantinovič Glazunov - Concerto for Piano no 1 in F minor, Op. 92
- Aleksandr Konstantinovič Glazunov - Concerto for Piano no 2 in B major, Op. 100

Russian Faust
(CD | 481 0794 DH DDD) – 2014 - Decca Records
- Sergej Vasil'evič Rachmaninov - Son. per pf.: n. 1 in re min. op. 28
- Sergej Vasil'evič Rachmaninov - Son. per pf.: n. 2 in si bem. min. op. 36

Childhood memories
(CD| 481 5416 DH DDD) – 2017 - Decca Records
- Music by Schumann, Liszt, Chopin, Shor, Scriabin, Rachmaninov, Debussy
