= Diemut Poppen =

German violist and professor

- Born: Münster
- Occupations: Classical violist; Academic teacher
- Organizations: Chamber Orchestra of Europe; Hochschule für Musik Detmold; Thüringische Sommerakademie; Reina Sofía School of Music

Diemut Poppen (born in Münster, Germany) is a German violist.

Diemut Poppen was born into a prominent musical family in Germany and began playing the violin at the age of seven, giving her first solo concerts at nine. She later switched to the viola after being introduced to it through chamber music. Poppen studied with leading musicians including Kim Kashkashian, Bruno Giuranna, Yuri Bashmet, Hariolf Schlichtig, Georges Janzer, and Peter Schidlof of the Amadeus Quartet. She has performed as a soloist under the direction of conductors such as Frans Brüggen, Heinz Holliger and Claudio Abbado.

Poppen has been a member of the Chamber Orchestra of Europe, the Lucerne Festival Orchestra, and the Orchestra Mozart.

She succeeded Nobuko Imai in her position at the Hochschule für Musik Detmold. She has been a member of the jury at several international competitions such as the ARD International Music Competition in Munich. She is also director of the Thüringische Sommerakademie (Chamber Music Summer Academy in Thuringia) and she founded the Osnabrück Chamber Music Series.

Poppen has recorded for different labels such as Deutsche Grammophon, Live Classics, Cappricio, Ondine, Ars Musici, Tudor and EMI. Her wide repertoire includes the new concertos for viola and orchestra by Mikhail Pletnev and by Giya Kancheli (Styx).

She currently teaches at the Reina Sofía School of Music in Madrid.; at the Hochschule für Musik Freiburg and at ZHdK.
