= Yves Rault =

French pianist

- Born: 1 August 1958
- Died: 16 September 1997 (aged 39)
- Occupation: pianist
- Years active: 1978-1997

Yves Rault (1 August 1958 – 16 September 1997) was a French pianist.

He started to play the piano at age of six. From 1968 he lived in Saint-Jean-de-Luz where he studied with Ada Labeque until he entered the Conservatoire National Superieur de Musique de Paris: he completed his musical studies at the age of 17 winning a 1st Piano Prize (class of Yvonne Loriod) and a 1st Prize in Chamber Music (class of Geneviève Joy). Subsequently, he attended the master-classes of eminent musicians such as Vlado Perlemuter, Nikita Magaloff, Rafael Da Silva, Charles Rosen, György Sebök, Paul Badura-Skoda and Claude Helffer.

Awarded a Fulbright Scholarship in 1979, he decided to perfect his skills in New York City studying at the Juilliard School with Jacob Lateiner and William Masselos: in the meanwhile, he obtained the 1st Prize at the Gina Bachauer Memorial Piano Competition at Juilliard. He also won several other International Piano Competitions (Maria Canals International Music Competition 2nd Prize in Barcelona, Marsala's 2nd Prize, Vercelli's 4th Prize, Epinal's 4th Prize...). A dazzling career starts with new international awards: Grand Prize of the Charles Cros Academy with the violinist Raphael Oleg for their recording of Schumann's Sonatas (1980), 3rd Prize and Special Prize of Contemporary Music at the Paloma O'Shea Santander International Piano Competition in Spain (1982), 1st Prize at the Ciudade do Porto International Piano Competition (1984).

These successes led him to give recitals around the world: France, Spain, the Netherlands, Italy, Portugal, Switzerland, United States, Japan, Australia and South Africa. He performed regularly with various orchestras (Radio France New Philharmonic Orchestra, Spanish Radio Television Orchestra, Orchestre national du Capitole de Toulouse...). He was invited as a soloist by various foreign televisions and radios, and has also recorded for Radio France and French Television.

The eclecticism of his tastes led him to become interested in a diverse and sometimes unexplored repertoire (Ricardo Viñes, Ernesto Nazareth, Guillaume Lekeu...) and his interest for the contemporary music made him participate in many first performances mainly with the Montpellier Philharmonic Orchestra and with several French contemporary musical ensembles such as 2E2M, GERM, Musique Oblique, and Contrechamps.

Rault died in Paris of AIDS on 16 September 1997, at the age of 39.
