= Celso Albelo =

Spanish operatic tenor

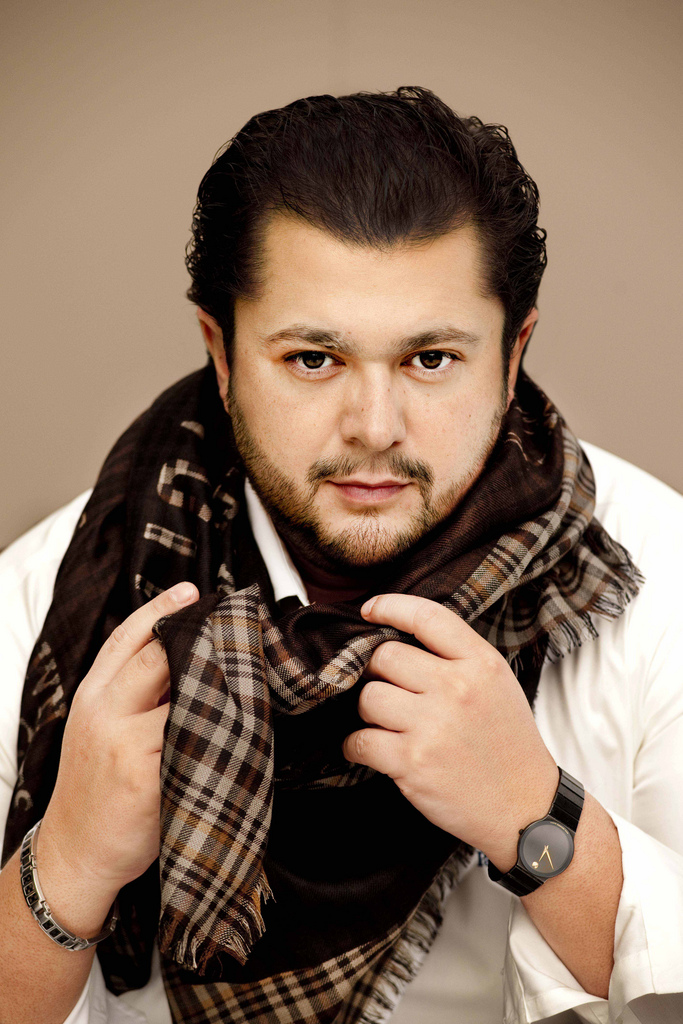
- Born: 17 November 1976 (age 48); Santa Cruz de Tenerife, Canary Islands, Spain
- Occupation: Opera singer (tenor)
- Years active: 2006–present
- Website: www.celsoalbelo.com

Celso Albelo (born 17 November 1976) is a Spanish operatic tenor. He has sung leading roles in many opera houses including Teatro alla Scala (Milan), the Royal Opera House (London), Teatro La Fenice (Venice).

== Biography ==
Born in Santa Cruz de Tenerife, he got his firsts singing lessons from Pilar Castro Palazon, he continued at the Conservatorio Superior de Música in his home town with Isabel García Soto and at the Queen Sofía College of Music in Madrid with Tom Krause and Manuel Cid. He later perfected his training with Carlo Bergonzi at the Busseto Academy.

In 2006, he debuted as Duca di Mantova in Rigoletto (Verdi) in Busseto, singing alongside Leo Nucci. From then on he has been invited to perform by La Scala in Milan (Pagliacci, Don Pasquale), the Fenice in Venice (L'elisir d'amore, Rigoletto), the Rossini Opera Festival in Pesaro (Stabat Mater), the Accademia Nazionale di Santa Cecilia in Rome (Guillaume Tell), the Teatro Lirico Giuseppe Verdi in Trieste (Don Pasquale, Les pêcheurs de perles, Maria Stuarda), the Teatro Carlo Felice in Genoa (Don Pasquale), the Teatro Comunale di Bologna (I Puritani), the Verdi Theatre in Salerno (Lucia di Lammermoor, I Puritani), the Teatro Lirico di Cagliari (Falstaff, L'elisir d'amore), the Terme of Caracalla in Rome (Rigoletto), the Teatro Massimo Bellini in Catania (Maria Stuarda), the Teatro Real in Madrid (Rigoletto), the Alfredo Kraus Opera Festival in Las Palmas, Canary Islands (La Sonnambula, L'elisir d'amore), the Teatro Campoamor in Oviedo, the La Coruña Opera Festival (Rigoletto, Don Pasquale, I Puritani, La fille du régiment), the Castell de Peralada International Music Festival (Don Pasquale), Zurich Opera House (Rigoletto, Don Pasquale, La Juive, Gianni Schicchi, Maria Stuarda), the Savonlinna Opera Festival (I Puritani), the Baden-Baden Festival (La Sonnambula in concert format), Tokyo Opera House (Lakmé), Montecarlo Opera (Rigoletto) and Hamburg State Opera (L'elisir d'amore). Recently he has sung at the Royal Opera House in London (La Sonnambula), at Opéra National de Paris (La fille du régiment), at the Wiener Staatsoper (L'elisir d'amore, La sonnambula) and at the Deutsche Oper in Berlin (Lucia di Lammermoor) at the Metropolitan Opera in Maria Stuarda.

== Prizes ==
Celso Albelo has been awarded the Opera Actual Prize 2008, the Opera Oscar bestowed by the Arena di Verona Foundation (2010–2012) and the Teatro Campoamor National Prize for Opera 2010–2012. He has been awarded the Medalla de Oro de Canarias 2013, the Giuseppe Lugo Award 2013 in Italy, the Premio Codalario in 2014 and the Premio Taburiente in 2017.
