= Asier Polo =

Spanish cellist

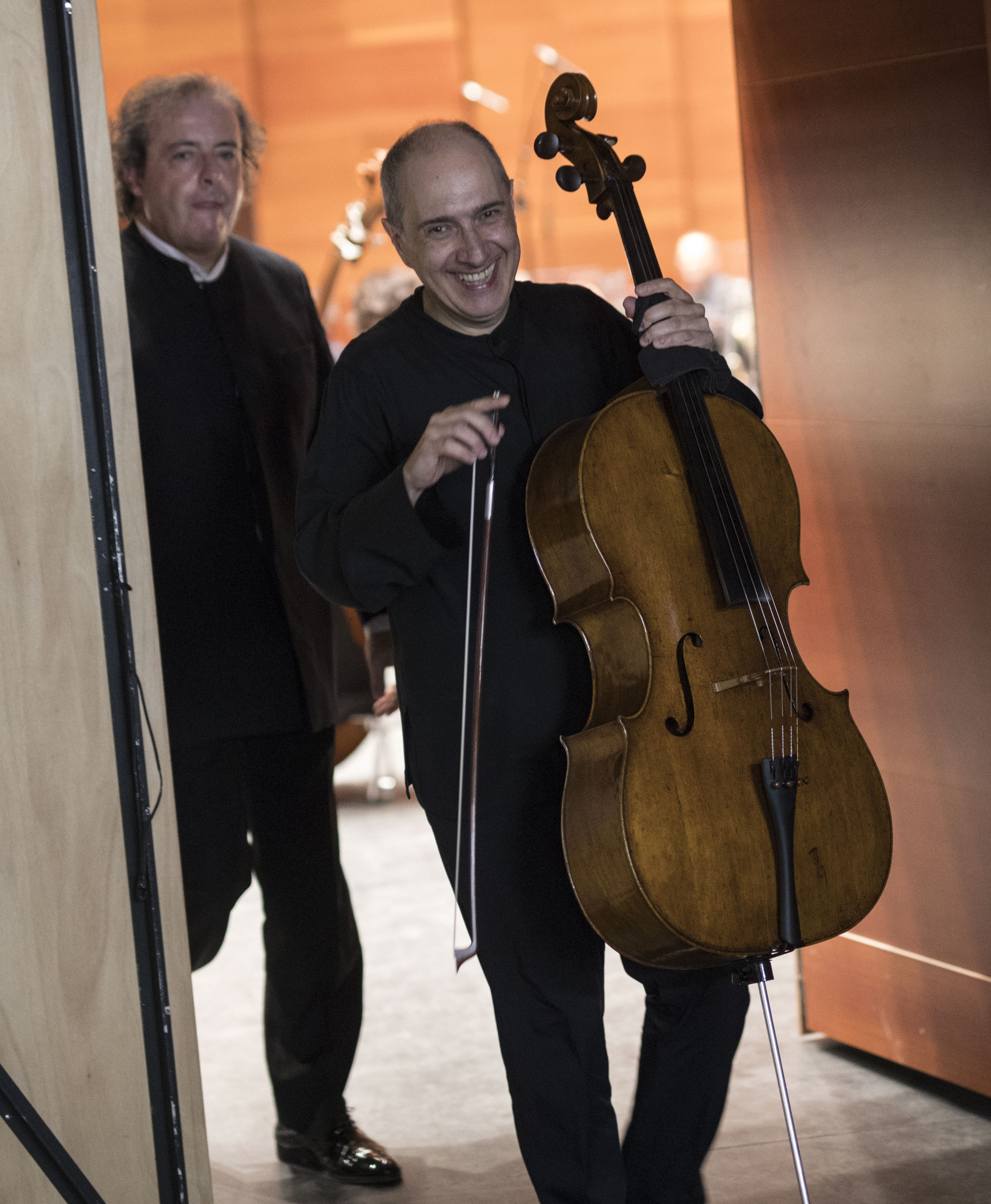
- Asier Polo, 2020
- Born: Bilbao, Spain
- Occupation: Classical cellist

Asier Polo is a Spanish cellist.

== Biography ==
Polo was born in Bilbao where he studied at the Conservatory of Music with Elisa Pascu. In 1987–1989, he won first prizes in cello and chamber music at the National Young Musicians Competition. Later, he studied at the Reina Sofía School of Music, and with Maria Kliegel at the Hochschule fur Musik in Cologne and with Ivan Monighetti at the Basel Academy of Music. Polo has participated in master classes with Natalia Gutman and Mstislav Rostropovich. During his studies in Cologne and Madrid, he also studied chamber music with the Amadeus Quartet and members of Quartetto Italiano. Since then, he has appeared as soloist and in recitals in Europe, Asia and America. He has performed with Maria Kliegel and the late Alfredo Kraus, who, during his last years, invited Polo to appear as soloist in his concerts at Covent Garden in London and Maggio Musicale in Florence, Tonhalle in Zurich, and the Musikverein in Vienna.

== Performances ==
Polo has toured South America with the Spanish National Orchestra with Rafael Frühbeck de Burgos conducting, and has played with the Opera Orchestra of Nice, the National Orchestra of Bordeaux, Prague Chamber Orchestra, Basel Philharmonic, the Monterey Symphony Orchestra, and the Israel Philharmonic. Conductors with whom he has appeared as soloist include Christian Badea, Gunther Herbig, Antoni Wit, and Arturo Tamayo. In 2006 he performed at Carnegie Hall in New York City.

He also plays often with the pianist from Legazpi, Marta Zabaleta.

Spanish composers Gabriel Erkoreka, Luis de Pablo, Antón García Abril and Carmelo Bernaola have written works premiered by Polo, who was described as "outstanding" by Carlos Prieto.

Polo plays on a Francesco Rugieri violoncello (Cremona 1689) bought in collaboration with Banesto. He currently teaches at the Centro Superior de Música del País Vasco-Musikene and at Conservatorio della Svizzera Italiana in Lugano.

== Recordings ==
Polo has recorded for Claves Records, RTVE Records, Marco Polo Records and Naxos Records, and has recorded for radio and TV in Spain, Germany and Japan.
