= Armands Ābols =

Latvian pianist

Armands Ābols is a Latvian pianist.

In 1992 Abols won at 18 Barcelona's Maria Canals International Music Competition. Three years later he took part at the XIII Paloma O'Shea Competition, the dean of Spanish piano competitions; he made it to the finals, ranking along the rest of the finalists second to Enrico Pompili - the Grand Prize was declared void, a decision Ābols criticised.

In 1993 he began a concert career, regularly performing through South America. In the mid-90s he settled in Chile. Since 2003 he holds a professorship at the conservatory of the Austral University of Chile.
