= Yung Wook Yoo =

South Korean pianist (born 1977)

- Hangul: 유영욱
- RR: Yu Yeonguk
- MR: Yu Yŏnguk

Yung Wook Yoo (born December 27, 1977) is a South Korean pianist, winner of the Paloma O'Shea Santander International Piano Competition.

== Biography ==
Born in Seoul on December 27, 1977, Yoo started studying piano in South Korea and then moved to the United States to study at Juilliard Pre-College and then at the college section under Martin Canin and later with Jerome Lowenthal. He later studied at the Manhattan School of Music. His graduate studies were supported by The Paul & Daisy Soros Fellowships for New Americans. Yoo won the first prize of the Kosciuszko Chopin Competition, the Montreal International Music Competition and the Grand Prize and Gold Medal of the Paloma O'Shea International Piano Competition, Spain.

Yoo has performed at the Wigmore Hall, Salle Pleyel, Carnegie Hall, National Auditorium of Music (Madrid), Palau de la Música (Barcelona), L'Auditori (Barcelona) and the Zurich Tonhalle. He has also performed with the Spanish National Orchestra, Barcelona Symphony and Catalonia National Orchestra, Orchestra National de Lille, Orchestre National de France, Saint Petersburg Philharmonic Orchestra, Orquesta Ciudad de Malaga, Orquesta Nacional de la Republica Dominica and the Orquesta Sinfonica de Tenerife under conductors such as Rafael Frühbeck de Burgos, Pinchas Steinberg and Philippe Jordan.
