= Yurie Miura =

Japanese musician

Yurie Miura (三浦 友理枝, Miura Yurie) is a Japanese pianist and actress from Oota, Tokyo. After graduating from Ferris High School in Yokohama and later studied at the Royal Academy of Music in London. In 2001, she won first prize of the Maria Canals International Music Competition.
