= Wen Xiao Zheng =

Chinese violist (born 1981)

Wen Xiao Zheng (Chinese: 郑闻晓; pinyin: Zhèng Wénxiǎo; born 1981) is a Chinese violist born in Shanghai and he studied at the Reina Sofía School of Music in Madrid. He is the second prize-winner at the 2008 ARD International Music Competition in Munich, Germany.
