= David Kuijken =

Dutch pianist

David Kuijken is a Dutch pianist.

He has performed internationally since he debuted in 1984 at the Queen Elizabeth Hall. Kuijken forms a duo with Brenno Ambrosini, with whom he shared palmares at the XI Paloma O'Shea Santander International Piano Competition in Santander. He's known for his work on Dutch contemporary music.

He teaches at the Royal Conservatory of The Hague and the Conservatorium van Amsterdam.
