= Martina Filjak =

Croatian pianist (born 1978)

- Born: 1978 (age 47–48); Zagreb, Croatia
- Occupation: Pianist
- Instrument: Piano
- Years active: 1990 – present
- Labels: Tutico, Naxos Records, Sony Classical
- Website: www.martinafiljak.com

Martina Filjak (born 1978 in Zagreb) is a Croatian concert pianist.

== Biography ==
Martina Filjak started playing piano at the age of 5 and held her first public performance aged 6. She completed her studies at the Music Academy in Zagreb, the Vienna Conservatoire, the Hochschule für Musik in Hannover and additionally at the Como Piano Academy.

Filjak was awarded the 2007 Concorso Busoni's 5th prize, and subsequently won the 2007 Viotti and 2008 Maria Canals competitions. In addition, she won the Bösendorfer Prize. In 2009 she won the first prize at the 2009 Cleveland International Piano Competition.

Martina Filjak has performed with orchestras of her home country and abroad, including The Cleveland Orchestra; the Zagreb, Strasbourg, Morocco, Belgrade and Torino Philharmonics; the Barcelona, Bilbao, Chautauqua, Tenerife, Chile and Moscow Symphony Orchestras; the Georgian Chamber Orchestra of Ingolstadt, Croatian Chamber Orchestra and the Chamber Orchestra of South Africa under conductors Jahja Ling, Christian Zacharias, Heinrich Schiff, Theodor Guschlbauer and Stefan Sanderling and more. As a recitalist as well as concerto soloist, Ms. Filjak has performed in such major venues as the Concertgebouw in Amsterdam, Konzerthaus Berlin, L'Auditori and Palau de la Música Catalana in Barcelona, Carnegie Hall in New York City, Palais de la musique et des congrès in Strasbourg, Musikverein in Vienna, Shanghai Oriental Art Center and the Severance Hall in Cleveland.

Her New York recital debut at Carnegie Hall in December 2009 received excellent reviews by the New York Times critic Anthony Tommasini praising her 'resourcefulness of her technique and the naturalness of her musicality' and declaring her 'a pianist to watch'. In October 2009 she was additionally awarded an honorary medal by the president of the Republic of Croatia for her artistic achievements.

In 2010 and 2011 she performed with the Deutsche Radio Philharmonie and Christoph Poppen, at the Al Bustan Festival in Lebanon, the Granada Symphony Orchestra and the Hong Kong Sinfonietta and as a recitalist at the Munich Residenz and at the Palau de la Musica in Barcelona. Future performances include appearances with the Charlotte Symphony Orchestra, The Florida Orchestra, the Boston Philharmonic, the Madrid Symphony Orchestra, the Staatskapelle Weimar and the Granada Symphony Orchestra.

Miss Filjak holds dual Croatian and Italian nationality and speaks 7 languages.

== Discography ==
- 2001 – Album Piano passionato / Tutico Classic
- 2011 – CD Antonio Soler: Keyboard Sonatas Nos. 1–15 / Martina Filjak, Piano / Naxos
- 2013 – CD Robert Schumann: Andante and Variations Op. 46 / Jan Vogler, Christian Poltéra (Cellos), Juho Pohjonen, Martina Filjak (Pianos), Johannes Dengler (Horn) / Sony Classical
- 2017 – CD Piano: J.S. Bach, Robert Schumann, Alexander Scriabin / Martina Filjak, Piano / Solo Musica

== Awards and honors ==
- 1993 – prize of the Zagreb Philharmonic Orchestra
- 1998 – prize of the Jeunesses Musicales Croatia
- 2005 – honorary award at the Animato Competition in Paris
- 2007 – 5th prize in the finals of the Ferruccio Busoni International Piano Competition in Bolzano
- 2007 – 1st prize at the Viotti International Music Competition in Vercelli
- 2008 – Vladimir Nazor Award (annual award for the year 2007)
- 2008 – Milka Trnina Award (for the year 2007)
- 2008 – 1st prize and Gold Medal at the Maria Canals International Music Competition in Barcelona
- 2008 – Orlando Award at the 59th Dubrovnik Summer Festival
- 2009 – 1st prize & Gold Medal at the Cleveland International Piano Competition
- 2009 – Order of the Croatian Interlace for outstanding musical achievements
- 2013. – Judita Award for best artistic achievement at the 59th Split Summer Festival
