= Pavel Nersessian =

Pavel Nersessian Па́вел Тигра́нович Нерсесья́н Honored Artist of the Russian Federation
- Born: 26 August 1964 (age 61); Ramenskoye
- Genres: Classical music
- Occupation: Pianist
- Instrument: Piano
- Website: pavelnersessian.com

Pavel Nersessian (Russian: Павел Тигранович Нерсесьян, born 26 August 1964) is a Russian classical pianist. He is an Honored Artist of the Russian Federation and Professor of the Moscow Conservatory State Conservatory after P.I. Tchaikovsky and Boston University.

== Biography ==
Pavel Nersessian was born in Ramenskoye, a town outside Moscow, Russia Federation on 26 August 1964. In 1971-1982 he studied at the Central Music School (Class by V. Levin). In 1973 he made his debut by playing the Concerto No. 5 in F minor, BWV 1056 by Johann Sebastian Bach with the orchestra in the city of Gorky. After graduating from high school with honors, in 1982 he entered the Moscow Conservatory (class of Sergei Dorensky).

=== Teaching activity ===
Upon graduating from the Moscow Conservatory in 1987 he was proposed to teach there. He began teaching as an assistant to Sergei Dorensky and worked as a piano instructor at Children’s Music School No. 60 in Moscow.

In 2013 he became a professor of piano in Boston University.

=== Into the world arena ===
Nersessian has been noted for his versatility across a wide range of piano repertoire. He has won prizes in every piano competition he has entered, including Beethoven Competition in Vienna in 1985, Paloma O’Shea Competition in Santander and Tokyo Competition. He made his American debut in 1993 at Alice Tully Hall, which the New York Times called "impressive" with "a gift for softly colored expressiveness," but lacking "a major intellectual challenge."

Record of piano prizes, incomplete
Year	Competition	Prize	Ex-aequo with...	1st prize winner
1985	(Austria) VII Ludwig van Beethoven, Vienna	2nd prize		(Austria) Stefan Vladar
1987	(Spain) X Paloma O'Shea Santander International Piano Competition	4th prize	(China) Xiang Dong Kong	(United States) David Allan Wehr
1991	(Republic of Ireland) II Dublin Competition	1st prize		

=== Concert activity ===
Nersessian has served on international juries, including the Dublin International Piano Competition (Ireland), International Festival of Classical Music and Competition of Young Pianists (Kazakhstan), and Summit Music Festival (USA).

== Recordings ==
Pavel Nersessian has recorded disks with compositions of Chopin, Schumann, Schubert, Brahms, Tchaikovsky, Beethoven, Shostakovich etc. In 1995, Nersessian released an album featuring Schumann’s Kreisleriana, Op. 16, and Chopin’s 24 Preludes, Op. 28, under the Moscow Conservatory label.

=== Discography ===
- Tchaikovsky - The Sleeping Beauty / Schubert, Scarlatti, Scriabin, Schumann, Moszkowski, Rachmaninov - (CD) Pavel Nersessian 2005, Bel Air Music
- Rachmaninov - Russian Rhapsody / Dukas - L'apprenti sorcier / Debussy - Prelude / Bizet - Jeux d'enfants - Andrei Pisarev, Pavel Nersessian (CD) 2005, Bel Air Music
- Beethoven - Piano Concerto No. 4 - Pavel Nersessian / Sonata No. 32 - Andrei Tchistiakov (CD) 2005, Bel Air Music
- Beethoven - Concerto for Violin and Orchestra in D Major Op. 61, Sonata no. 14 in C sharp minor Op. 27/2 2005, Bel Air Music
- R.Schumann Kreisleriana, opus 16, F.Chopin 24 preludes opus 28, Pavel Nersessian, 1995 Moscow Conservatory

== Awards ==
- Merited Artist of the Russian Federation (August 31, 2005)
