= Valérie Aimard =

French classical cellist (born 1969)

Valérie Aimard (born June 1969) is a French classical cellist.

== Life ==
Born in Lyon, Aimard studied with Michel Strauss and Philippe Muller at the Conservatoire de Paris. She obtained a first prize in cello and a first prize in chamber music, and followed the perfectionnement cycle.

In 1992, she met Bernard Greenhouse, a student of Pablo Casals, a founding member of the Beaux Arts Trio, who became her master.

She has won several international cello and chamber music competitions (including first prize in the Maria Canals International Music Competition in 1991). She has performed in some twenty countries in recitals, chamber music and as a soloist, and has been invited to the United States for three consecutive summers at the Marlboro Music School and Festival.

Her recordings have received several awards (Diapason d'Or, Choc du Monde de la Musique, ffff de Télérama), in particular the recording of works for cello and piano by Felix Mendelssohn in 1997. When it was published in early 1998, the Diapason magazine wrote:

Valérie Aimard stood out two years ago with Kodaly's sonata for solo cello in which she affirmed a perfect mastery of the instrument in all expressive registers, and a stylistic requirement that gave hope for a continuation. What amazes me first of all about Valérie Aimard is the material: a generous sound that radiates without ever seeking the effect for itself, an infallible sense of long phrasing. And then she knows how to make Mendelssohn sing on the razor blade, with her puffs of enthusiasm and her veils of modesty: neither excessive romanticism nor stiffness[…]

Aimard is a lecturer in Teacher Training at the 2nd cycle in the Pedagogy Department and teaches chamber music at the 1st, 2nd and 3rd cycles in the Classical and Contemporary Instrumental Disciplines Department of the Conservatoire de Paris.

She has performed with her brother, the pianist Pierre-Laurent Aimard, at the Edinburgh Festival, Aldeburgh Festival, Piano Ruhr Festival, Festival de La Roque-d'Anthéron and in prestigious venues such as the Kioi Hall in Tokyo and the Théâtre des Champs-Élysées in Paris.

In addition to classical music concerts, Aimard gives mime shows alone on stage, "Bulles", where she "shares her passion for the art of pantomime".

== Records ==
- Zoltán Kodály's Sonata for Solo Cello, (Agon, November 1996)
- Felix Mendelssohn's complete work for cello and piano with Pierre-Laurent Aimard piano (Lyrinx 1998), reissued in 2009 ASIN B00008LOFS
- Musique française, with Cédric Tiberghien, piano (Lyrinx 2002) ASIN B000063XQE
- Budapest 1900 with Cédric Tiberghien, piano ASIN B001LQRBEU, (Lyrinx 2006)
