= Jesús González Alonso =

Spanish pianist

Jesús González Alonso (Gijón, 1946) is a Spanish pianist.

He settled in Vienna after graduating at the Madrid Conservatory in 1964. A winner of Vercelli's Viotti competition (1966), he was awarded 2nd prizes at the two first editions of the Santander's Paloma O'Shea competition. He attended the Hochschule für Musik und Darstellende Kunst in Wien from 1965 to 1971, where in 1971 he was awarded the Klavier-Konzertfach-Diplom with Honours. 1973 he was awarded First prize at the "Bosendorfer" Piano Contest in Wien.
