= Reina Sofía School of Music =

Private music school founded in Madrid, Spain

Escuela Superior de Música Reina Sofía
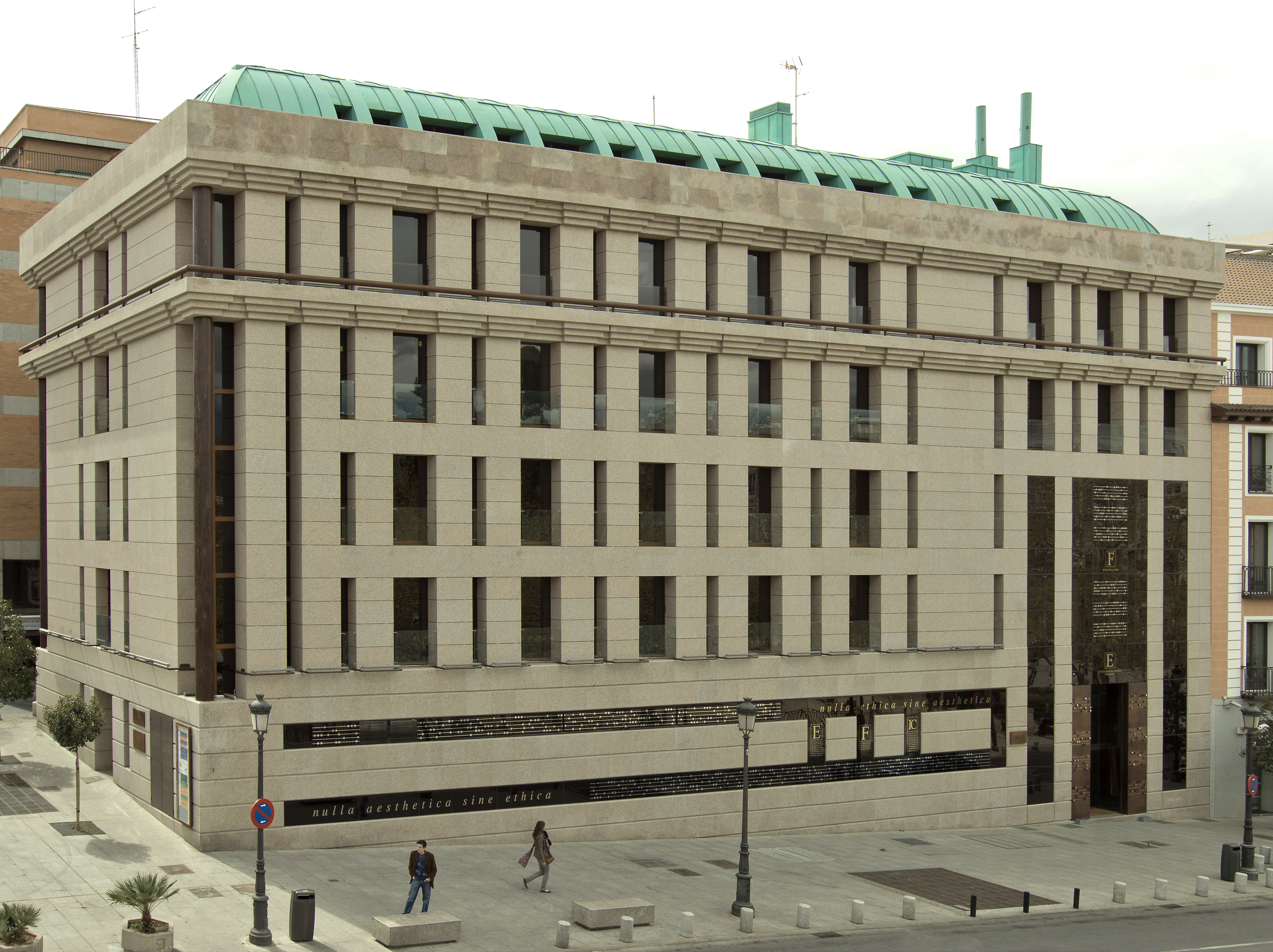
- Type: Private
- Established: 1991
- President: Paloma O'Shea
- Principal: Òscar Colomina i Bosch
- Students: 150 (2020–2021)
- Location: Requena, 1, 28013, Madrid, Spain; 40°25′01″N 3°42′44″W
- Campus: Urban
- Website: www.escuelasuperiordemusicareinasofia.es

The Reina Sofía School of Music (Spanish: Escuela Superior de Música Reina Sofía) is a private music school founded in Madrid, Spain. It was founded in 1991 by Paloma O'Shea and forms part of the Albéniz Foundation. The school is named after its honorary president, Queen Sofía of Spain.

== History ==
The school was established in 1991 by Paloma O'Shea in 1991 in Madrid, with the aim of providing Spain with a centre for advanced training for young musicians and of promoting classical music to a wider public.

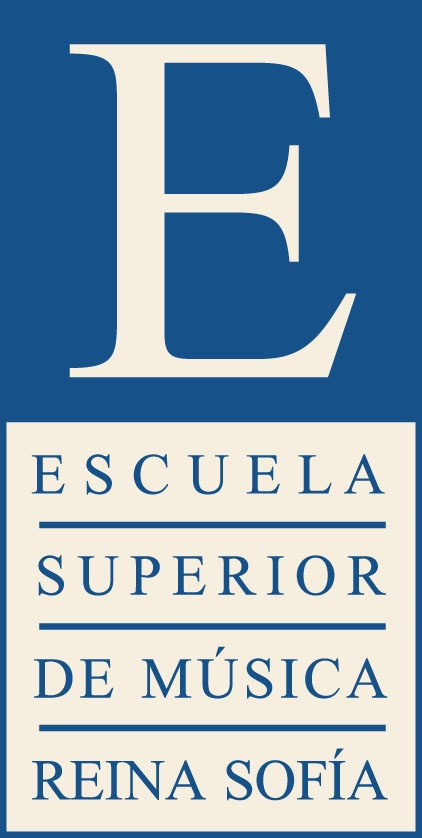
Escuela Superior de Música Reina Sofía

Its origins are closely linked to the Paloma O'Shea Santander International Piano Competition, founded by O'Shea in 1972, and to the series of masterclasses she organised from 1981 in collaboration with the Universidad Internacional de Verano Menéndez Pelayo in Santander.

In its formative years, and in the selection of its faculty, the school drew on the advice of musicians including Yehudi Menuhin, Mstislav Rostropovich, Daniel Barenboim, Zubin Mehta, and Alicia de Larrocha. Many of these figures also served on its academic committee and board, as well as acting as consultants to the institution. Contributions from Federico Sopeña and Enrique Franco, both prominent figures in twentieth-century Spanish musical life, were also significant.

== Campus ==
The school is located in the Plaza de Oriente, adjacent to the Royal Palace and the Teatro Real. The premises, situated on Calle de Requena, previously housed the School of Performing Arts and Dance.

=== Sony Auditorium ===
The campus includes the Sony Auditorium (Spanish: Auditorio Sony), a concert hall with a seating capacity of 351. Designed primarily for chamber music, it was acoustically designed by Vicente Maestre and includes an organ built by Gerhard Grenzing. The auditorium hosts an average of 150 concerts each year.

== Faculty ==
The teaching staff is composed of internationally recognized performers and educators. Alongside its resident faculty, the school regularly invites guest performers to lead masterclasses, offering students exposure to a wide range of artistic perspectives.

=== Current professors ===
Among the current professors are Zakhar Bron, Marco Rizzi, Diemut Poppen, Stanislav Ioudenitch, Nobuko Imai, Ivan Monighetti, Jens Peter Maintz, Jacques Zoon, Hansjörg Schellenberger, Pascal Moraguès, Gustavo Núñez, Radovan Vlatkovic, Galina Eguiazarova, Francisco Araiza, Fabián Panisello, Heime Müller, and Márta Gulyás.

== Academic and artistic activity ==
The school offers several higher education programmes, including a bachelor's degree in music (introduced in 2015–2016 in accordance with the Bologna Process), master's degrees in music performance and composition, a foundation course, and diplomas in music performance and composition. All programmes are structured to provide tailored training according to the individual needs and potential of each student.

An important element of the institution's activity is its strong emphasis on performance. Each academic year, the school organizes more than 300 concerts in the Sony Auditorium and at other venues across Spain.

== Students ==
The school trains approximately 150 students annually, drawn from various countries. Owing to financial support from public and private sponsors, tuition and other associated costs are covered for all students.

During their studies, students participate in orchestral and chamber ensembles and typically perform in around 20 concerts per year.

=== Notable alumni ===
Since its foundation in 1991, the Reina Sofía School has trained more than 850 students, some of whom have gone on to notable careers as performers: Aquiles Machado, Arcadi Volodos, Asier Polo, Celso Albelo, Cuarteto Casals, Fibonacci Quartet, Eldar Nebolsin, Juan Pérez Floristán, Latica Honda-Rosenberg, Nora Salvi, Pablo Ferrández, Martín García García, Rui Borges Maia, Sol Gabetta, Tommaso Lonquich, Wen Xiao Zheng, Xavier Inchausti, Dúo del Valle, Cuarteto Quiroga, Ana Lucrecia García, Johane González Seijas, Stanislav Ioudenitch, Ismael Jordi, Claudio Martínez Mehner, Luis Fernando Pérez, David Kadouch, Emil Rovner, Pablo Díaz, and Ünüşan Kuloğlu.

== Orchestras ==
The Reina Sofía School of Music maintains several orchestras composed of its students and conducted by faculty members or guest conductors. These ensembles include the Camerata Viesgo, the Sinfonietta (in collaboration with Fundación BBVA), the Freixenet Symphony Orchestra, and the Freixenet Chamber Orchestra. On 13 November 2025, the Reina Sofía School Orchestra gave its first performance in the United States, led by conductor Andrés Orozco-Estrada, together with players from the Colombian Youth Philharmonic.

A number of internationally renowned conductors have led these ensembles, among them András Schiff, Andrés Orozco-Estrada, Vladimir Ashkenazy, Luciano Berio, Péter Csaba, Sir Colin Davis, Peter Eötvös, Pablo González, Pablo Heras-Casado, Jesús López Cobos, Lorin Maazel, Yehudi Menuhin, Zubin Mehta, Krzysztof Penderecki, Josep Pons, Antoni Ros Marbà, and Jordi Savall.

== See also ==
- Paloma O'Shea Santander International Piano Competition
