= Polina Leschenko =

Russian women pianist

Polina Leschenko was born in St Petersburg into a family of musicians and began playing the piano under her father’s guidance at the age of six. Two years later she made her solo debut with the Leningrad Symphony Orchestra in St Petersburg. She studied with Sergei Leschenko, Vitali Margulis, Pavel Gililov, Alexandre Rabinovitch-Barakovsky and Christopher Elton. At the age of 16 she received her Higher Diploma with the greatest distinction from the Royal Conservatory of Brussels.

Leschenko works with orchestras around the world including the Hallé, London Mozart Players, Scottish Chamber, Bournemouth Symphony, Britten Sinfonia, Orquesta de Euskadi, Russian National and Australian Chamber orchestras. An accomplished and admired chamber musician, Polina Leschenko also performs frequently at many festivals, including Aldeburgh, Risor, West Cork, Stift, Moritzburg, Progetto Martha Argerich in Lugano and Musiktage Mondsee. Regular collaborations with artists include Ivry Gitlis, Sol Gabetta, Patricia Kopatchinskaja, Mark Drobinsky, Julia Fischer, Alexander Sitkovetsky, Natalie Clein and Priya Mitchell.

The 2009/2010 season includes concerto performances with the Hallé, London Mozart Players and Scottish Chamber Orchestra as well as the Armenian Philharmonic, Irish Chamber Orchestra, i Pomeriggi Musicali and the Bern Symphony. The season also includes chamber music and recitals around the UK and Europe, including the Brucknerfest, the Pharos Trust and the Schwetzingen Festival.

Polina Leschenko has given major solo recitals in Vienna’s Konzerthaus, Amsterdam’s Concertgebouw and New York’s Carnegie Hall as well as in Salzburg, London, Paris, Brussels, Minnesota and Atlanta. In September 2008 she toured South America with the Hallé Orchestra and Sir Mark Elder. Robert Beale wrote in the Manchester Evening News, “Leschenko…combines power and lyrical fluency…the piece became a series of ever more vivid episodes held together by its melodic transformations as well as its keyboard histrionics. The Chopin, too, was dazzling and charming at the same time.”

2009 saw Leschenko commence a new position as International Chair in Piano at the Royal Welsh College of Music & Drama in Cardiff, where she began a three-year residency.

Polina Leschenko has recorded a debut CD for EMI in the series ‘Martha Argerich presents …’ with works by Liszt, Chopin, Kreisler/Rachmaninov, Brahms and Bach/Feinberg. The Gramophone described her as having ‘technical dexterity in abundance, and signs of a major artist in the making’. She has also recorded a well-received disc of Prokofiev chamber music with Martha Argerich, Christian Poltéra and Roby Lakatos, for Avanticlassic. And her latest disc – a Liszt recital, including the B minor Sonata – was released in May 2007 by Avanticlassic. Martine Dumont-Mergeay wrote in La Libre Belgique (4 July 2007): "Polina Leschenko has matured without having lost any of her freedom. Now even more inspired, she turns her wonderful talents to a brilliant, almost improvisatory reading of the Liszt repertoire. Beautifully acknowledging Bach, Busoni and Gounod’s Liszt transcriptions in the first half of the disc, she then offers a unique and personal version of the Sonata: a visionary reading full of lucidity." The disc has won several awards: a Choc du Monde de la Musique, Pizzicato magazine’s Supersonic and a Joker from Belgian magazine Crescendo.
