= Viktor Lyadov =

Russian pianist (1966–2024)

- Виктор Лядов
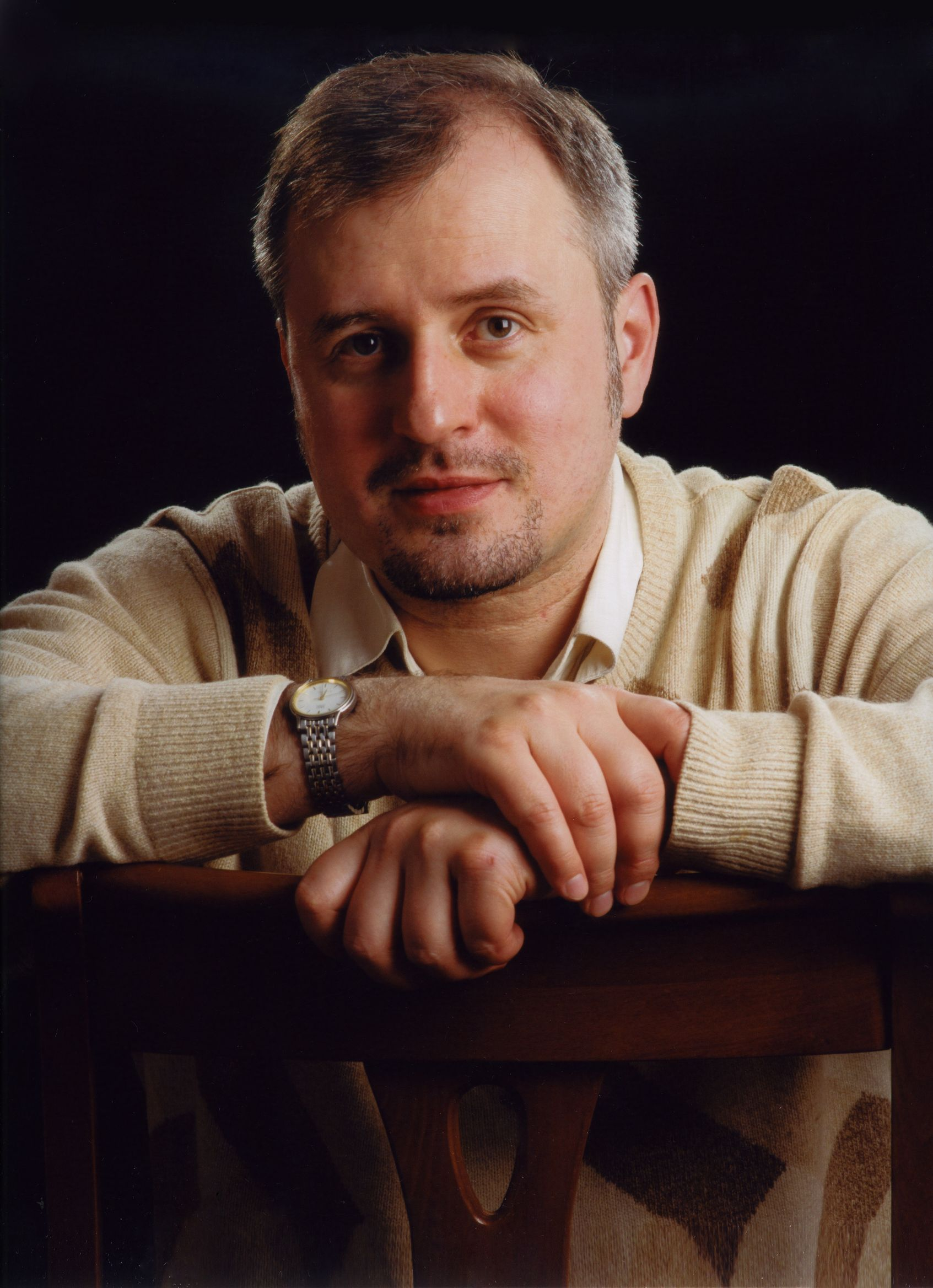
- Lyadov in 2013
- Born: 18 February 1966; Engels, Russia
- Died: 8 September 2024 (aged 58)

Viktor Ivanovich Lyadov (Russian: Виктор Иванович Лядов, 18 February 1966 – 8 September 2024) was a Russian pianist.

Still a student at the Moscow Conservatory, he won prizes at Zwickau's Robert Schumann and Paloma O'Shea Santander International Piano competitions. In 1994 he won the Hamamatsu International Piano Competition. He achieved 6th prize at the 1995 Queen Elisabeth Competition

Lyadov died on 8 September 2024, at the age of 58.
