= Jesus C. Gonzalez =

American gun rights activist (born 1986)

Jesus C. Gonzalez (born December 16, 1986) is an American man from Milwaukee, Wisconsin, known for a gun rights civil lawsuit, as well as being convicted of a reckless homicide shooting.

== Open carry lawsuits ==
Until November 2011, Wisconsin was an open carry state for the purposes of gun control. Under state law it was legal to carry a loaded, visible handgun, but concealing that gun (even by a jacket covering the hip) was illegal.

In May 2008, Gonzalez entered a Menards store with a pistol openly displayed in a thigh holster. An employee called the police to report a man with a gun in the store; meanwhile a different employee asked Gonzalez to leave. Gonzalez left without incident, but was confronted by police outside the store. He was arrested for disorderly conduct, as was a common practice in many Wisconsin jurisdictions that did not approve of the practice of open carry by civilians.

In April 2009, Gonzalez entered a Chilton Walmart while openly carrying a gun, and attempted to buy ammunition for a different weapon. The store manager called 911, and Gonzalez was again arrested for disorderly conduct.

Eventually charges were dropped in both cases, but Gonzalez sued in federal court, claiming that his Fourth and Fourteenth Amendment rights had been violated due to the arrests. In this case Gonzales was represented by John Monroe, a noted Georgia gun rights lawyer.

Federal judge Lynn Adelman, of the U.S. District Court of the Eastern District of Wisconsin, ultimately dismissed the lawsuit, arguing that officers had probable cause for the arrests. This ruling however caused a Circuit split as it conflicted with an earlier ruling from a district court in Georgia. This split has not yet been resolved by the Supreme Court.

In September 2010, Gonzalez appealed against the dismissal of his civil rights case.

Meanwhile, the Wisconsin attorney general has issued guidance to district attorneys and law enforcement stating that under Wisconsin law, and Wisconsin interpretation of federal law, open carry in and of itself does not create an arrestable offense. Additionally, Wisconsin has passed a concealed carry law which took effect in November 2011.

In February 2012, the appeals were dismissed, with U.S. Circuit Judge Diane Sykes ruling that the officers involved had qualified immunity, as it was reasonable for the officers to believe they had probable cause for disorderly conduct, as well as possible confusion regarding the legality of open carry at the time.

== 2010 shooting ==
On May 9, 2010, Danny John and Jered Corn were at Mamie's Tavern in Milwaukee. According to a police report, they were asked to leave the bar for being "loud and profane"; a bartender claims that they were being loud, but that she did not ask them to leave. According to the police report, before leaving the two men were seen burning money at the end of the bar. After they left, the men decided to go to a nearby friend's house, and debated if they should walk or drive. Corn claims John decided to drive because he did not want to leave the car in the tavern's parking lot, but Corn decided to walk. In his opening statement, Assistant District Attorney Grant Huebner said Corn and John had "more than a few drinks." During the trial, the medical examiner reported John's blood alcohol level at 0.19. The legal limit in Wisconsin is 0.08.

Gonzalez's home was two doors down from the tavern. While the exact circumstances are under debate, the core facts are uncontested: Gonzalez shot John and Corn. John managed to drive around the corner where he was later found still alive by police. Gonzalez then called 911 and reported the shooting, and unloaded his gun. In his 911 call, Gonzalez reported "I just had two individuals try to assault me when I was going outside to move my car." When police arrived, Gonzalez was waiting for them with his arms in the air, and the gun inside his home. He surrendered peacefully. Corn and John did not have any weapons on them, and in the 911 call Gonzalez stated, "I don't know what they had, but they must have thought that I was not armed." When police arrived, John was still alive and said that he was shot by an unknown Hispanic male. He died of his injuries at the hospital. Corn was found on the ground near where he was shot, unable to move his legs.

=== Charges ===
Gonzalez was charged with first degree intentional homicide and attempted first degree intentional homicide as a result of the shooting. Under Wisconsin law, self-defense is a mitigating circumstance to these charges, and once claimed the prosecution must prove beyond a reasonable doubt that the mitigating circumstance does not exist. Actual self-defense is an absolute defense to the charges. Unnecessary self-defense (the accused believed self-defense was needed, but such belief was unreasonable) reduces the charges. If the prosecution cannot prove the accused did not have a valid self-defense motive (even an unreasonable one), the charges are automatically reduced. Under most of the reduced charges, unreasonable self-defense is no longer an affirmative defense. Actual (reasonable) self-defense is a valid defense for the reduced charges.

=== Trial ===
Gonzales pleaded not guilty to the charges, and was released on $100,000 bail. Gonzalez was originally allowed to keep a weapon while on bail, but a restriction prohibiting firearms was later added as a bail condition. While the case was pending, Gonzalez's bail conditions were modified several times to allow him to travel to California for a wedding and family holidays.

==== Jury selection ====
Of the 34 potential jurors in the case, only two owned handguns. They were not selected for the jury. Also not selected were two people who knew homicide victims, one whose relative is charged with a shooting of his girlfriend, a man who said a friend had been hit with a police officer's car in Los Angeles, and a woman who was a prior juror that acquitted the defendant in an attempted homicide case. None of the potential jurors said they had strong feelings about current gun rights debates or belonged to any gun rights or gun control advocacy groups. In total, seven men and five women served on the jury.

==== Testimony of Jared Corn ====
Jared Corn testified that as he was walking towards his friend's house Gonzalez confronted Corn, telling him to "back the 'f' up." Corn asserts that he raised his hands into the air and proceeded to back up, while Gonzalez continued to advance towards him. Corn told police that Gonzalez fired, and the next thing he remembers was waking up on his back.

==== Testimony of police ====
Police testimony largely centered around positively identifying the victims and Gonzalez, as well as identification of the gun and bullets. One significant piece of testimony was that Gonzalez's car was in the opposite direction from the tavern, 144 feet from the shooting. Due to the type of bore on Gonzalez's gun, ballistics testing was not able to positively identify the bullets as having been fired from Gonzalez's gun. However police testified that it was likely based on the 911 call, proximity of the shooting, and the caliber of the weapon.

==== Defense ====
Gonzalez's attorney, Nelida Cortes, said in her opening statement, "There isn't always just one way to see things," and asked them to consider the character and motives of witnesses. Corn had previously been convicted of multiple disorderly conduct violations, as well as marijuana convictions. John had previously been convicted of battery. The defense called one witness, a police officer that testified about the behavior of the victims - as reported by the bartender. Gonzalez pleaded the Fifth Amendment and did not testify. The defense made a motion for a directed verdict and a motion to dismiss, both which were denied.

Although Gonzalez did not testify, the judge instructed the court on the criteria for self-defense, and said that the burden was on the state to show that Gonzalez did not reasonably believe he faced a threat of death or great bodily harm, or didn't believe deadly force was necessary to prevent it.

In her closing arguments, Gonzalez's attorney argued that Gonzalez was attacked with a deadly weapon, namely a drunk driver necessitating the use of deadly force in self-defense. The assistant district attorney reminded the jury that in his 911 call, Gonzalez did not mention a drunk driver, but claimed two men had tried to assault him.

==== Verdict ====
After slightly more than four hours of deliberation, the jury returned a verdict of guilty of the lesser charges of first degree reckless homicide, and first degree reckless injury. Gonzalez's bail was revoked after the verdict while awaiting sentencing, even though his bail had been lenient during the trial. The judge said the conviction changed the equation.

==== Vacated judgement and new charges ====
Immediately prior to the sentencing, the reckless injury conviction was vacated, and Gonzalez pleaded no contest to a charge of second degree reckless endangerment. The judge found him guilty of this charge.

==== Sentence ====
On November 18, 2011, Gonzales was sentenced to 20 years in prison for the shootings. Due to Wisconsin's truth in sentencing laws, Gonzalez is expected to serve his full term, and is not eligible for any of Wisconsin's early release programs.

Gonzalez was also ordered to pay restitution of $379.93 to Jared Corn, and $15,000 to EPIC life insurance. His previous bail was used for this purpose.

The judge informed Gonzalez that his voting rights are suspended, and additionally as a convicted felon, he is no longer allowed to possess firearms.

| Charge | Class | Maximum Sentence | Actual Sentence/Notes |
|---|---|---|---|
| 1st Degree Intentional Homicide | Class A | Life | Charges reduced to Reckless Homicide by jury |
| 1st Degree Reckless Homicide (940.02(1)) | Class B | 60 years | 20 years + 5 years supervision, served concurrently |
| Attempted 1st Degree Intentional Homicide | Class B | 60 years | Charges reduced to Reckless Injury by jury |
| 1st Degree Reckless Injury | Class D | 25 years, $100k | 1st degree conviction vacated by court, modified to 2nd degree |
| 2nd Degree Reckless Injury (941.30(2)) | Class G | 12.5 years, $25k | 5 years + 5 years supervision, served concurrently |
