= Dag Achatz =

Swedish virtuoso pianist and composer

Dag Achatz is a Swedish pianist and composer.

Born in Stockholm in 1942 of a Swedish mother and a Viennese father, both musicians, he was raised in Switzerland, where he entered the Geneva Conservatory at age of 8. Graduating with honors, he continued his studies with Greta Eriksson in Stockholm, with Alfred Cortot and Guido Agosti in Siena, and with Susanne Roche and Vlado Perlemuter in Paris. In 1960 he claimed victory in the Rudolf Ganz Competition in Lausanne, and in 1964 took first prize at the coveted Maria Canals International Music Competition in Barcelona. He was also a prizewinner at the Bavarian Radio Competition in Munich and the Viotti Competition in Vercelli. He has since performed in more than 25 countries and in most major musical centers, including London, Paris, New York, Boston, Berlin, Moscow, Saint Petersburg, Vienna, Tokyo and Beijing.

Achatz has played more than 1,000 recitals and has performed more than 240 times with orchestras including the radio orchestras of Stockholm, Munich, Paris, Stuttgart, Torino, Milan, and with the Orchestre de Pasdeloup of Paris, l'Orchestre de l'Opéra de Monte Carlo, the Gewandhaus of Leipzig, the Staatskapelle of Dresden, and with the Philharmonic Orchestras of Stockholm, Oslo, Barcelona and Lisbon. He has participated in the international music festivals of Montreux, Aix-en-Provence and Savonlinna in Finland. He has also collaborated with many eminent conductors, including Celibidache, Bernstein, Kertesz, Zinmann, Kamu, Maris Jansons and others. His master classes have taken him to the Academie-Festival des Arcs in France, the Institute of Advanced Musical Studies in Montreux, the Osaka Conservatory in Japan, and the Umea International Academy in Sweden.

Dag Achatz serves frequently on the juries of international competitions, including those at Jaen, the Clara Haskil, Vercelli, Paris, Oporto, Munich, (Bavarian Radio Orchestra Competition), and many others.

In chamber music and lieder, he has performed with the Da Ponte Quartet, the Fresk String Quartet, with singers Barbara Hendricks, Birgit Finnilä, Hugues Cuenod and Joanna Porackova, and in four-hand music with Yukie Nagai. He has made more than two dozen recordings for BIS, CBS, EMI, Melodiya and Americus Records. His best-selling CD of the music of Gershwin, on the BIS label, has been widely praised, as are his recordings of Debussy, Ravel, Scriabin, Schumann, Liszt, Stenhammar, Grieg and many others.

Outside the established classical music world, he also worked on stage with French singer-songwriter Léo Ferré, during the mid-1970s.
