= Jesús González (footballer, born 1969) =

Mexican footballer and manager

Personal information
- Full name: Jesús González Romero
- Date of birth: 18 April 1969 (age 57)
- Place of birth: Toluca, State of Mexico, Mexico
- Position: Defender

Senior career*
Years	Team	Apps	(Gls)
1989–1995	Toluca	92	(0)

Managerial career
- 2008–2016: Pachuca Reserves and Academy
- 2017–2019: Monarcas Morelia Reserves and Academy
- * Club domestic league appearances and goals

Jesús González Romero (born April 18, 1969) is a Mexican football manager and former player.
