= Enrico Pompili =

Italian pianist

Enrico Pompili (born 1968 in Bolzano) is an Italian pianist.

A native of Bolzano, he won several Italian national competitions before receiving recognition at the Dublin International Piano Competition. In 1994 he was second to Viktor Lyadov at the Hamamatsu Competition, and next year he was awarded the 2nd prize at the XIII Paloma O'Shea Santander International Piano Competition - 1st prize void. This success launched his international career starting from 1996.

He has recorded Niccolò Castiglioni (Col Legno) and Alberto Ginastera's complete piano works (Phoenix Classics). He has released a collection of solo and two piano works by American composer Michael Glenn Williams on the Stradivarius label.
