= Jesús Gónzález Macías =

Mexican politician

- Born: 27 May 1972 (age 53); Tampico, Tamaulipas, Mexico
- Occupation: Politician
- Political party: PVEM

Jesús Gónzález Macías (born 27 May 1972) is a Mexican politician from the Ecologist Green Party of Mexico. From 2007 to 2009 he served as Deputy of the LX Legislature of the Mexican Congress representing Nuevo León.
