= Eldar Nebolsin =

- Born: 1974 (age 51–52)
- Genres: Classical
- Occupation: pianist

Eldar Nebolsin (born 1974) is an Uzbek-born classical pianist.

== Biography ==
Born in Uzbekistan (then part of the Soviet Union) in 1974 to a Russian father from Ukhta and a mother from Tashkent, Nebolsin started studying piano at early age in his native country. In 1991 he moved to Madrid to study with Dimitri Bashkirov at the Reina Sofía School of Music.

== Career ==
Nebolsin's international career started after his triumph at the XI Santander International Piano Competition. In 2005 Eldar Nebolsin won the First Prize at the Sviatoslav Richter International Piano Competition.

Eldar Nebolsin has performed with the New York Philharmonic, Chicago Symphony, Cleveland, Detroit, Houston, Minnesota, Baltimore, San Luis, Montreal Symphony Orchestra, WDR Symphony Orchestra Cologne, Bamberg Symphony, Deutsches Symphonie-Orchester, Stuttgart Radio Symphony Orchestra, Estonian National Orchestra, Deutsche Oper Orchester Berlin, Vienna Chamber Orchestra, Orchestre national du Capitole de Toulouse, Gulbenkian Foundation Orchestra, Orchestra dell'Accademia Nazionale di Santa Cecilia, Orquesta Sinfónica de Galicia, Tenerife, Royal Seville Symphony Orchestra, Real Philharmonía de Galicia among others and with conductors such as Riccardo Chailly, Yuri Temirkanov, Leonard Slatkin, Vladimir Ashkenazy, Hans Vonk, Yakov Kreizberg, Lawrence Foster, Vasili Petrenko, Rafael Frühbeck de Burgos, Pedro Halffter, Ros Marbà and Víctor Pablo Pérez, among others.

== Awards and recognitions ==
Santander Grand Prize and gold medal and Prize to Mozart Concerto Best Performance, XI Santander International Piano Competition

The Sviatoslav Richter Prize & Prize for the best performance of a classical concerto for piano and orchestra (Mozart piano concerto), Sviatoslav Richter International Piano Competition

== Recordings ==
- Rachmaninoff: 24 Preludes Opp. 2/3, 23 & 32 – Naxos (8.570327)
- Rachmaninoff: Piano Concerto No. 1 in F sharp minor, Op. 1/ Works by Rachmaninoff - UNIVERSAL
- Chopin - Allegro de concert, Op. 46; Sonata No. 3, Op. 58, Valse in D flat, Op. 70, No. 3, Grande Valse in A flat, Op. 42 / Liszt - Hungarian Rhapsody No 12, Apres un Lecture du Dante (London) – DECCA
- Chopin - Piano Concertos - Vladimir Ashkenazy (conductor) – DECCA
- Prokofiev - Works for Violin and Piano / Eldar Nebolsin (piano), Latica Honda-Rosenberg (viola)/ Oehms Records
- Liszt: Piano Concertos Nos. 1 and 2 / Totentanz – Naxos (8.570517)
- Brahms: Piano Quartet No. 2 in A major, op. 26 – Naxos
- Mahler: Piano Quartet in A minor – Naxos
