= Claudio Martínez Mehner =

Spanish piano soloist and pedagogue (born 1970)

Claudio Martínez Mehner (born in Bremen, 1970) is a Spanish piano soloist and pedagogue.

== Biography ==
Martinez-Mehner studied at Madrid Conservatory, the Reina Sofía School of Music in Madrid, the Peabody Institute, the Moscow Conservatory, the International Piano Foundation "Theo Lieven" and the Hochschule für Musik Freiburg. He was a finalist at the 1990 Paloma O'Shea Santander International Piano Competition (Spain), to which he would return as a member of the jury in 2018; in 1992 he won the first prize at the Pilar Bayona Competition.

Claudio is a chamber music specialist, he has recorded chamber music with the Casals Quartet. As a soloist he has performed with the Munich Philharmonic, Moscow Philharmonic Orchestra, Orchestra of the Teatro Alla Scala, Scottish Chamber Orchestra, Prague Philharmonic Orchestra, Orchestra della Svizzera Italiana, North German Radio Symphony Orchestra and most of the major Spanish orchestras.

Claudio retired for seven years from the concert scene while recovering from an injury. As of 2002 he started to perform again both in recitals and as soloist.

Martínez Mehner held a professorship at the Conservatorio Superior de Música de Aragón. Now holds a professorship at Hochschule für Musik Basel and served as Dmitri Bashkirov's assistant at the Escuela Superior de Música Reina Sofía.
