= Dmitri Alexeev =

Russian pianist (born 1947)

Dmitri Konstantinovich Alexeev Дмитрий Константинович Алексеев
- Born: 10 August 1947 (age 78); Moscow
- Occupations: Pianist, teacher
- Instrument: Piano

Dmitri Konstantinovich Alexeev (Russian: Дмитрий Константинович Алексеев, Dmitrij Konstantinovič Alekseev, born 10 August 1947 in Moscow) is a Russian pianist.

He studied at the Moscow Conservatory, and additionally under Dmitri Bashkirov. In the 1970s Alexeev made his debuts in London, Vienna, Chicago, and New York City, and also won the Leeds Piano Competition in 1975.

As of 2010, he was teaching at the Royal College of Music in London. He is represented by IMG Artists.

Alexeev's repertoire, part of which has been recorded, includes works by Alexander Scriabin, Robert Schumann, Johannes Brahms, Sergei Prokofiev, Frédéric Chopin, Sergei Rachmaninoff, and Dmitri Shostakovich. He has also accompanied Barbara Hendricks.

== Selected discography ==
- Johannes Brahms: Piano Works, Ops. 76 and 116-119 / Robert Schumann: Etudes Symphoniques (EMI)
- Frédéric Chopin: Waltzes (Complete) (EMI Seraphim)
- Frédéric Chopin: Preludes (Complete) (EMI)
- Edvard Grieg / Robert Schumann: Piano Concerti - with Temirkanov, Royal PO (EMI)
- Nikolai Medtner: Piano Concerto No 1; Piano Quintet - with Lazarev, BBC SO (Hyperion)
- Sergei Prokofiev: Piano Concerti Nos. 2 & 3 - with Temirkanov, Royal PO (EMI)
- Sergei Rachmaninoff: Preludes; Morceaux De Fantasie; Moments Musicaux (Virgin Classics)
- Sergei Rachmaninoff: Rhapsody on a Theme of Paganini - with Temirkanov, St. Petersburg PO (RCA)
- Sergei Rachmaninoff: Piano Concerto No. 2; Three Preludes - with Fedoseyev, Royal PO (EMI)
- Sergei Rachmaninoff / Nikolai Medtner: Music for Two Pianos - with Nikolai Demidenko (Hyperion)
- Alexander Scriabin: Sonatas (Complete) (Brilliant Classics)
- Alexander Scriabin: Prometheus - with Muti, Philadelphia O (EMI)
- Dmitri Shostakovich: Piano Concerti Nos. 1 & 2; Assault on the Beautiful Gorky - with Maksymiuk, English Chamber O (Classics for Pleasure)
