= Ninth Van Cliburn International Piano Competition =

The Ninth Van Cliburn International Piano Competition took place in Fort Worth, Texas from May 22 to June 6, 1993. Italian pianist Simone Pedroni won the competition, while Valery Kuleshov and Christopher Taylor were awarded the Silver and bronze medals.

Morton Gould composed his Ghost Waltzes for the competition.

== Jurors ==
- (United States) John Giordano (chairman)
- (Spain) Joaquín Achúcarro
- (France) Philippe Entremont
- (United States) Claude Frank
- (Brazil) Nelson Freire
- (United States) Edward Gordon
- (England) Moura Lympany
- (Russia) Lev Naumov
- (France) Cécile Ousset
- (United States) John Pfeiffer
- (United States) Menahem Pressler
- (United States) Abbey Simon
- (Japan) Takahiro Sonoda
- (United States) Ralph Votapek

== Results ==
Contestant	R1	SF	F
(United States) Mark Anderson			
(Japan) Hiroshi Arimori			
(United States) Andrew Armstrong			
(Armenia) Armen Babakhanian			5th
(Italy) Fabio Bidini			6th
(United States) Frederic Chiu			
(Italy) Francesco Cipolletta			
(New Zealand) Read Gainsford			
(United States) Allan Gampel			
(Russia) Kirill Gliadkovsky			
(United States) Jennifer Hayghe			
(Russia) Ilya Itin			
(Georgia (country)) Alexander Korsantia			
(Russia) Valery Kuleshov			Silver medal
(South Africa) Petronel Malan			
(Germany) Jura Margulis			
(Russia) Alexander Melnikov			
(Finland) Laura Mikkola			
(Canada) Lorraine Min			
(Brazil) Edoard Monteiro			
(Canada) Shirley Hsiao-Ni Pan			
(Italy) Enrico Pace			
(South Korea) Hae-sun Paik			
(Italy) Simone Pedroni			Gold medal
(Canada) Richard Raymond			
(Russia) Veronika Reznikovskaya			
(Belgium) Johan Schmidt			4th
(England) Graham Scott			
(Russia) Margarita Shevchenko			
(Canada) Connie Shih			
(Russia) Sergei Tarasov			
(United States) Christopher Taylor			Bronze medal
(France) François Weigel			
(Germany) Andreas Woyke			
(Russia) Mikhail Yanovitsky			
