= Seventh Van Cliburn International Piano Competition =

The Seventh Van Cliburn International Piano Competition took place in Fort Worth, Texas from May 18 to June 2, 1985. Brazilian pianist José Feghali won the competition, while Philippe Bianconi and Barry Douglas were awarded the Silver and bronze medals.

John Corigliano composed his Fantasia on an Ostinato for the competition.

== Jurors ==
- (United States) John Giordano (chairman)
- (Turkey) İdil Biret
- (Cuba) Jorge Bolet
- (Bulgaria) Anton Dikov
- (United States) Malcolm Frager
- (Hungary) Arpad Joó
- (Hungary) Lili Kraus
- (China) Ming-Qiang Li
- (Japan) Minoru Nojima
- (France) Cécile Ousset
- (United States) Harold C. Schonberg
- (Switzerland) Soulima Stravinsky
- (Germany) Wolfgang Stresemann

== Results ==
Contestant	R1	SF	F
(United States) Dickran Atamian			
(Romania) Dan Atanasiu			
(Romania) Christian Beldi			
(France) Philippe Bianconi			Silver medal
(United States) William Bloomquist			
(United States) Kathryn Brown			
(United States) David Buechner			
(Taiwan) Hung-Kuan Chen			
(Taiwan) Chia Chou			
(Switzerland) Sergio de los Cobos			
(Belgium) Marie-Noëlle Damien			
(Bulgaria) Lora Dimitrova			
(United Kingdom) Barry Douglas			Bronze medal
(Germany) Thomas Duis			
(Brazil) José Feghali			Gold medal
(Indonesia) Eduardus Halim			
(United States) Diane Hidy			
(United States) Ingrid Jacoby			
(South Korea) Young-ho Kim			
(United States) Norman Krieger			
(United States) Paul Maillet			
(United States) Joel Martin			
(Japan) Yuki Matsuzawa			
(Hungary) Károly Mocsári			5th
(United States) Thomas Otten			
(United States) Susan Savage			
(Australia) Kathryn Selby			
(South Korea) Eun-soo Son			
(Bulgaria) Emma Tahmizian			4th
(New Zealand) Sharon Joy Vogan			
(Netherlands) Rian de Waal			
(United States) David Wehr			
(United Kingdom) Andrew Wilde			
(Germany) Hans-Christian Wille			6th
(United States) Patti Wolf			
(United States) William Wolfram			
