= Eighth Van Cliburn International Piano Competition =

Piano competition (1989)

The Eighth Van Cliburn International Piano Competition took place in Fort Worth, Texas, from May 27 to June 11, 1989. Soviet pianist Alexei Sultanov won the competition, while José Carlos Cocarelli (Brazil) and Benedetto Lupo (Italy) were awarded the silver and bronze medals. Sultanov was 19 years old at the time. Alexander Shtarkman (USSR), Tian Ying (China), and Elisso Bolkvadze (USSR) were the 4th, 5th, and 6th place winners respectively.

William Schuman composed his Chester: Variations for Piano for the competition, while Robert Rauschenberg created its official artwork. Rauschenberg was the first artist to be commissioned for the competition in its history." Dudley Moore served as master of ceremonies for the awards presentation.

Applicants were required to send videotaped auditions, and out of 240 applicants from around the world, 38 were chosen for the competition. Sultanov was the youngest of the 38.

The initial field of 38 competitors was narrowed down to 12 semifinalists: three from the USSR, two from China, and one each from Japan, France, Portugal, Canada, the USA, Brazil, and Italy. The twelve semi-finalists were each required to play a one-hour solo recital that included Schuman's commissioned work, Chester: Variations for Piano, and a quintet with the Tokyo String Quartet.

The six finalists performed two full-length concertos, one by either Mozart or Beethoven with the Fort Worth Chamber Orchestra, and the other work of the competitor's choosing with the Fort Worth Symphony Orchestra.

Sultanov was a student at Moscow State Conservatory during that time, and in 1990 he told The Christian Science Monitor that the conservatory was "not thrilled" that he won the Van Cliburn competition. He said the officials there had not wanted him to compete, but it was too late. He had already made it into the preliminary rounds.

The jury panel included both a Russian who had gained political asylum in the U.S. and a Soviet national. This fact was attributed by the United Press International to "the impact of glasnost".

A documentary film of the competition, The Eighth Van Cliburn International Piano Competition: Here to Make Music was produced and directed by Peter Rosen. Rosen was given the 1989 award for Best Documentary Director by the Directors Guild of America.

== Jurors ==
- (United States) John Giordano (chairman)
- (Soviet Union) Sergei Dorensky
- (Poland) Jan Ekier
- (France) Nicole Henriot-Schweitzer
- (United States) Lawrence Leighton Smith
- (China) Ming-Qiang Li
- (England) John Lill
- (Japan) Minoru Nojima
- (Brazil) Cristina Ortiz
- (United States) John Pfeiffer
- (Hungary) György Sándor
- (Soviet Union) Maxim Shostakovich
- (United States) Abbey Simon
- (Japan) Takahiro Sonoda
- (Spain) Joaquín Soriano
- (United States) Ralph Votapek

== Results ==
Contestant	R1	SF	F
(Japan) Seizo Azuma			
(France) Jean-Efflam Bavouzet			
(Soviet Union) Elisso Bolkvadze			6th
(United States) Kathryn Brown			
(United States) David Buechner			
(Portugal) Pedro Burmester			
(Canada) Angela Cheng			
(United States) Angela Cholakyan			
(Brazil) José Carlos Cocarelli			Silver medal
(Bulgaria) Lora Dimitrova			
(Germany) Thomas Duis			
(Germany) Konstanze Eickhorst			
(United States) Seung-un Ha			
(Indonesia) Eduardus Halim			
(Netherlands) Ivo Janssen			
(Germany) Jakob Jürgen			
(South Korea) Hae-jung Kim			
(Socialist Federal Republic of Yugoslavia) Rita Kinka			
(United States) Kevin Kenner			
(United States) Leonid Kuzmin			
(China) Jian Li			
(China) Hai Lin			
(Italy) Benedetto Lupo			Bronze medal
(Germany) Wolfgang Manz			
(Japan) Kayo Miki			
(Hungary) Károly Mocsári			
(Socialist Federal Republic of Yugoslavia) Predrag Mužijević			
(United States) John Nauman			
(United States) Shari Raynor			
(Soviet Union) Veronika Reznikovskaya			
(Australia) Victor Sangiorgio			
(Soviet Union) Alexander Shtarkman			4th
(Soviet Union) Boris Slutsky			
(South Korea) Ju-hee Suh			
(Soviet Union) Alexei Sultanov			Gold medal
(Republic of Ireland) Hugh Tinney			
(England) Andrew Wilde			
(China) Tian Ying			5th
