= First Van Cliburn International Piano Competition =

The First Van Cliburn International Piano Competition took place in Fort Worth, Texas from September 24 to October 7, 1962. It was won by American pianist Ralph Votapek, while Soviets Nikolai Petrov and Mikhail Voskresensky earned the silver and bronze medals.

== Jurors ==
- (United States) Leopold Mannes, Chairman
- (Brazil) Yara Bernette
- (Cuba) Jorge Bolet
- (United States) Angelo Eagon
- (Switzerland) Rudolph Ganz
- (Mexico) Luis Herrera de la Fuente
- (Japan) Motonari Iguchi
- (United States) Milton Katims
- (Hungary) Lili Kraus
- (Soviet Union) Lev Oborin
- (United States) Leonard Pennario
- (United States) Serge Saxe (local chairman)

== Results ==
Contestant	R1	SF	F
(Brazil) Vicky Adler			
(Canada) Anahid Alexanian			
(Uruguay) Carmen Álvarez			
(The Bahamas) E. Clement Bethel			
(United States) Jo Boatright			
(Mexico) Rafael Borges			
(South Korea) Sung-mi Cho			
(United States) William Cooper			
(United States) Don Feder			
(United States) Arthur Fennimore			7th
(Guatemala) Zoila García Salas			
(Soviet Union) Ilze Graubiņa			
(Belgium) André de Groote			
(United States) Milton Hallman			
(Japan) Takashi Hironaka			8th
(United States) James Jolly			
(Canada) Elaine Keillor			
(South Korea) Jung-kyou Kim			
(Japan) Hajime Kono			
(Soviet Union) Nina Lelchuk			
(United States) Marlene Linzmeyer			
(Uruguay) Leónidas Lipovetsky			
(United States) Thomas Mastroianni			
(Brazil) Arthur Moreira Lima			
(United States) Manigirdas Motekaitis			
(Japan) Hiroko Nakamura			w/d
(United States) Marilyn Neeley			5th
(Argentina) Marta Noguera			
(France) Cécile Ousset			4th
(South Korea) Yun-hee Paik			
(United States) Dorothy Payne			
(United States) John Perry			
(Soviet Union) Nikolai Petrov			Silver medal
(United Kingdom) David Pinto			
(New Zealand) Gloria Saarinen			
(Mexico) José Sandoval			
(Argentina) Raúl Sosa			
(United States) Charles Thomas			
(Portugal) Sérgio Varela Cid			6th
(Soviet Union) Mikhail Voskresensky			Bronze medal
(United States) Ralph Votapek			Gold medal
(United States) Margaret Watson			
(United States) Leslie Wells			
(United Kingdom) Grace Wilkinson			
(United States) Walter Wolfe			
(United States) Sandra Yaggy			
