= Arthur Rubinstein International Piano Master Competition =

Triennial piano performance competition in Tel Aviv

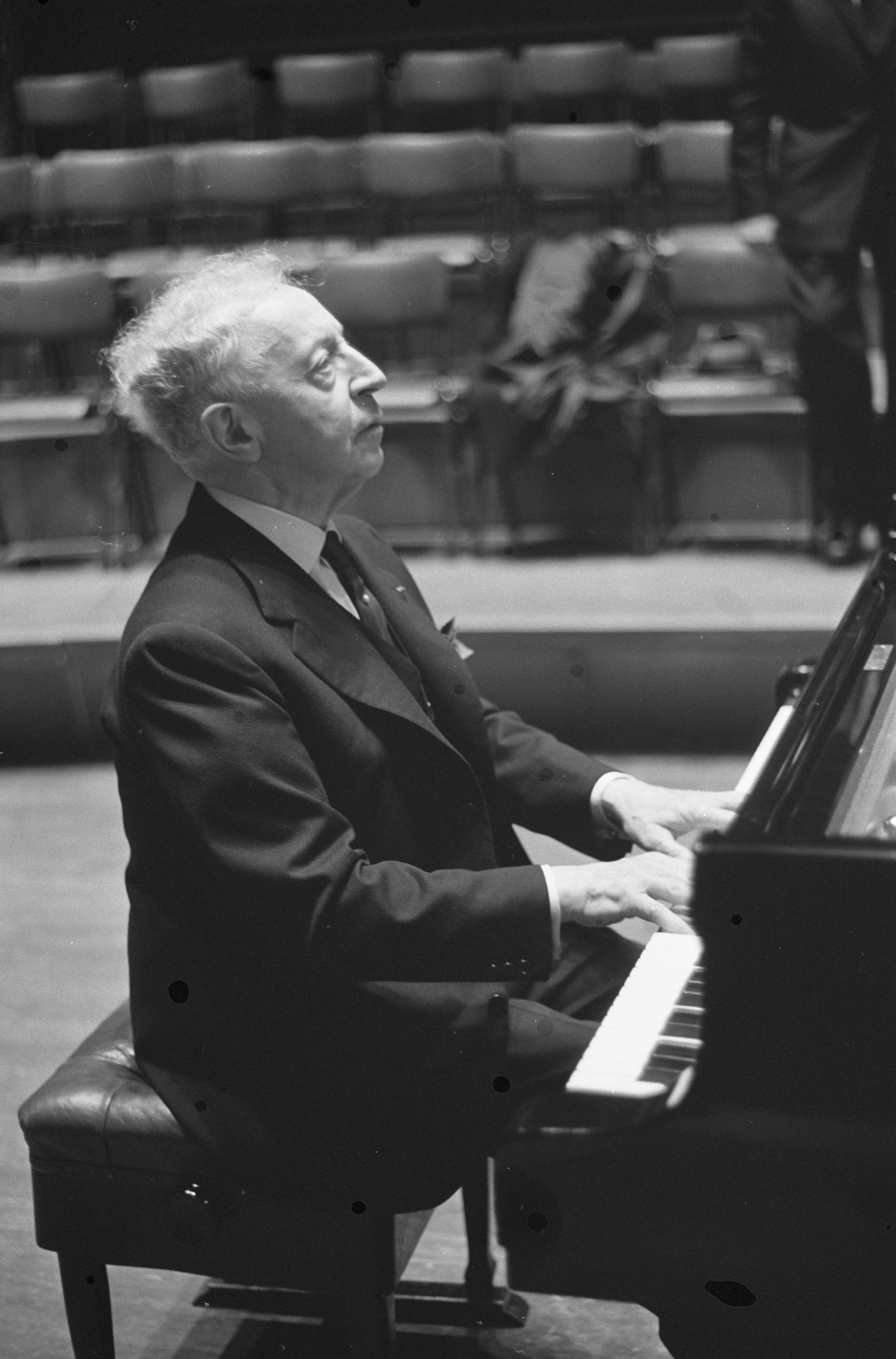

The Arthur Rubinstein International Piano Master Competition is an international piano competition specializing in the music championed by Arthur Rubinstein. The competition has been held every three years in Tel Aviv, Israel since 1974.

== History ==
The Arthur Rubinstein International Piano Master Competition came into being in 1973, at the initiative of Jan Jacob Bistritzky, a close friend of Arthur Rubinstein, who was honored to give his name to the Competition.

The Competition aims to attain standards of a high order and is an international forum for presenting aspiring young pianists and assisting in their artistic careers.

The Competition first took place in 1974 and is held every three years.

Rubinstein himself chaired the jury for the first two competitions, when the winners were Emanuel Ax and Gerhard Oppitz.

In 2003 pianist Idith Zvi succeeded Mr. Bistritzky as artistic director, a role she held until her retirement in 2020. Since July 2020, the artistic director of the Competition is pianist Ariel Cohen.

The past 40+ years of its history have continuously produced pianists who went on to international acclaim: Seong-Jin Cho Gerhard Oppitz, Angela Cheng, Alexander Korsantia, Kirill Gerstein, Alexander Gavrylyuk; Igor Levit, Khatia Buniatishvili, Boris Giltburg, David Fung, Daniil Trifonov, Alberto Ferro and others.

Due to the 2026 Iran war, the first stages of the 2026 contest were relocated to the Casals Forum in Kronberg, Germany. The final will be held in Tel Aviv but has been postponed until the security situation is stable enough for it to occur. The finals are currently scheduled for 3-9 September 2026.

== Winners ==
Year	First prize	Second prize	Third prize
1974	(United States) Emanuel Ax	(United States) Eugene Indjic	(Canada) Janina Fialkowska (Austria) Seta Tanyel
1977	(West Germany) Gerhard Oppitz	(Brazil) Diana Kacso	(Japan) Etsuko Terada
1980	(United States) Gregory Allen	(United Kingdom) Ian Hobson	(Australia) Geoffrey Tozer
1983	(United States) Jeffrey Kahane	(Taiwan) Hung-Kuan Chen	(China) Fei-Ping Hsu
1986	not awarded	(West Germany) Thomas Duis	(Hong Kong) Angela Cheng
1989	(United Kingdom) Ian Fountain (United Kingdom) Benjamin Frith	not awarded	(Poland) Krzysztof Jabłoński
1992	(Italy) Giorgia Tomassi	(Italy) Simone Pedroni	(Russia) Ilya Itin
1995	(Georgia (country)) Alexander Korsantia	(Russia) Sergey Tarasov	(Israel) Ohad Ben-Ari
1998	(Ukraine) Igor Tchetuev	(Ukraine) Vitaly Samoshko	(South Korea) Jong-Gyung Park
2001	(Russia) Kirill Gerstein	(Romania) Ferenc Vizi	(Italy) Massimiliano Ferrati
2005	(Ukraine) (Australia) Alexander Gavrylyuk	(Germany) Igor Levit	(South Korea) Yeol Eum Son
2008	not awarded	(Israel) Roman Rabinovich (Taiwan) Ching-Yun Hu	(Georgia (country)) Khatia Buniatishvili
2011	(Russia) Daniil Trifonov	(Israel) Boris Giltburg	(Russia) Ilya Rashkovsky
2014	(Ukraine) Antonii Baryshevskyi	(United States) Steven Lin	(South Korea) Seong-Jin Cho
2017	(Poland) Szymon Nehring	(Romania) Daniel Ciobanu	(United States) Sara Daneshpour
2021	(Spain) Juan Pérez Floristán	(Japan) Shiori Kuwahara	(China) Cunmo Yin
2023	(Canada) Kevin Chen	(Georgia (country)) Giorgi Gigashvili	(Japan) Yukine Kuroki
2026	(Russia) Dmitry Yudin	(Belarus) Uladzislau Khandohi (South Korea) Jinhyung Park	(Ukraine) Roman Fediurko

== See also ==
- Music of Israel
