= Sean Chen =

Sean Chen may refer to:

- Sean Chen (politician) (born 1949), Taiwanese politician
- Sean Chen (artist) (born 1968), Asian American artist
- Chen Hsin-an (born 1980), Taiwanese basketball player
- Sean Chen (pianist) (born 1988), American pianist

== See also ==
- Shaun Chen (politician) (born 1980) Canadian politician
