= Nicholas Roth =

- Genres: Classical music
- Occupations: Pianist, Professor of Music
- Instrument: Piano
- Years active: 1990s – present
- Label: Blue Griffin Recording

Nicholas Roth is an American classical pianist, recording artist and professor of piano at Drake University in Des Moines. He appeared as soloist with the St. Louis Symphony and the Indianapolis Symphony Orchestra under Raymond Leppard, among others. Roth has been featured in recitals and festivals throughout the United States and Europe. He was a 1993 Beethoven Fellow of the American Piano Awards. Roth holds the Doctor of Musical Arts degree from Michigan State University, Artist Diploma from the Hochschule für Musik in Munich, and M.M. and B.M. degrees from Indiana University, where he was also the recipient of the Performer’s Certificate. He studied with Ralph Votapek, Eliso Virsaladze, Helmut Deutsch, Edward Auer, Emilio del Rosario, and Michel Block. Roth has recorded works of Schumann, Scriabin, Rachmaninov, Blumenfeld, and Grieg with the Blue Griffin Recording label.
