= Isaac Mikhnovsky =

Isaac Iosifovich Mikhnovsky Исаак Иосифович Михновский
- Born: April 17, 1914; Smolensk, Russian Empire (present-day Russia)
- Origin: Russian Empire (1914-1917); Soviet Union (1917-1978)
- Died: February 18, 1978 (aged 63); Moscow, Russian SFSR, Soviet Union (present-day Russia)
- Genres: classical music
- Occupations: pianist; composer; music educator
- Instrument: Piano
- Years active: 1923－1978

Isaac Iosifovich Mikhnovsky (Note: Russian: Исаак Иосифович Михновский, romanized: Isaak Iosifovich Mikhnovsky) (17 April 1914 – 18 February 1978) was a prominent Soviet pianist, composer, professor, and winner of the First All-Soviet Piano Competition. Apart from his highly successful performing and teaching careers, composing was also a significant part of his multi-faceted musical life. The catalogue of his works includes numerous piano transcriptions of Romances and Operatic Fantasies on melodies of Russian composers, and also a significant number of original piano, vocal, and chamber compositions.

== Life and work ==
Isaak Mikhnovsky was born in Smolensk (Russian Empire), and at the age of 4 was noticed for his musical talents. Soon after that, his formal musical education began under the tutelage of E.I. Gurevich-Eiges. His first public performances were in Smolensk at the age of 9. In 1924 Mikhnowsky moved to Moscow, where he continued his musical education at the Mussorgsky Musical School, and subsequently at the Gnessin State Musical College. In 1930, Mikhnovsky was admitted to the Moscow Conservatory, first to the class of Lev Oborin, and later to the class of Konstantin Igumnov. For his graduation, he performed Sergei Rachmaninov’s “Rhapsody on a Theme of Paganini”—this was the very first performance of this work in the former Soviet Union. The score of this piece was given to him by his teacher, Igumnov, who in turn, had received it from Rachmaninov himself.

After graduation, Mikhnovsky continued his education at the School of Performing Arts Excellence in Moscow. In 1938, he became the winner at the First All-Union Piano Competition. Among the jury members was Sergey Prokofiev, whose vote became decisive in awarding the young pianist the First Prize. Mikhnowsky’s victory at the Competition propelled him into the elite ranks of Russian pianists. His name became widely known in Soviet Russia, and already in the spring of 1938, he performed concertos by Tchaikovsky, Rachmaninov and Beethoven in the exclusive Great Hall of the Moscow Conservatory, to rave reviews from the critics. In 1939, as a member of a group of young Soviet musicians that also included Emil Gilels, Yakov Flier, Pavel Serebryakov, Isaak Mikhnovsky participated in the Queen Elizabeth Competition in Brussels. Among western pianists participating in this competition was Arturo Benedetti Michelangeli. Mikhnovsky’s performances were acclaimed by leading critics and listeners, and also highly lauded by Arthur Rubinstein. During this period, he begins his professional performing career. He gave solo recitals and made concerto appearances in the largest Soviet cities, often performing with conductors such as Yevgeny Mravinsky, Kurt Sanderling, Nikolai Rabinovich, and Natan Rakhlin.

At the same time, Mikhnovsky started to teach at the Moscow Conservatory, where he soon became associate professor. In 1946–1948, Mikhnovsky created a series of piano transcriptions of romances by Russian composers, and fantasies based on operas by Tchaikovsky, Glinka, Rubinstein, Dargomyzhsky, and Rimsky-Korsakov. Prominent musicians such as Mstislav Rostropovich, Dmitry Kabalevsky, Lev Oborin, Reinhold Glière, and others enthusiastically endorsed these compositions. Starting from 1960, Miknovsky began to teach at the Gnessin State Musical College, later incorporated into the Gnessin Musical Academy. There he was awarded the title of Professor, and led classes in piano and chamber ensemble. During his career Isaak Mikhnovski met and worked with many leading musicians of his time, in particular, he developed a very close professional and personal relationship with Mstislav Rostropovich.

A prodigious technique, a beautiful and noble sound, and a profound understanding of the composer’s intentions marked his performing style. His enormous repertoire (over 30 solo programs) included music of all musical periods as well as of living contemporary composers. All his interpretations bore the stamp of a great musician, and a pianist of enormous technical, emotional and intellectual capacity. A list of his compositions includes sonatas for piano, for cello, for bassoon, and 12 preludes and ballades for piano. He also authored a number of highly original cadenzas for the concerti of Mozart and Beethoven.

Many, but not all, of Mikhnowsky’s solo and chamber performances for Soviet Radio were preserved, bearing witness to his unique artistry. Some performances were also recorded on LP. His all-Chopin program was recently re-issued on CD on the Melodya label.

He wrote a large number of transcriptions. These works were recorded by Petronel Malan.
