= Gui Mombaerts =

Belgian pianist (1902–1993)

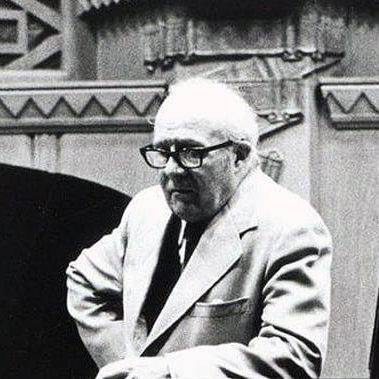
- Portrait c. 1971

Background information
- Born: Guillaume Mombaerts; October 6, 1902; Molenbeek-Saint-Jean, Kingdom of Belgium
- Died: June 6, 1993 (aged 90) Evanston, Illinois, U.S.
- Education: Royal Conservatory of Brussels
- Years active: 1926–1971

Guillaume Mombaerts (October 6, 1902 – June 6, 1993) was a Belgian pianist and music educator. He competed in the inaugural International Chopin Competition in 1927 and taught piano at Northwestern University from 1948 to 1971.

== Early life and education ==
Mombaerts was born in Molenbeek-Saint-Jean, a municipality within Brussels in the Kingdom of Belgium, to a French-speaking family in 1902. He began piano lessons at age eight and entered the Royal Conservatory of Brussels in 1912. He studied piano with Belgian pianist and composer Arthur De Greef, a pupil of Franz Liszt, and graduated from the conservatory in 1925. He won the Gunther Prize the following year.

== Career ==
Even while a student, Mombaerts developed a lasting interest in music education and began teaching at the school of music in Watermael-Boitsfort in 1923. Soon after leaving the Royal Conservatory of Brussels, he became a professor of piano and harmony at the Conservatory of La Louvière and a professor of piano at the Brussels Normal School of Music, both in 1925. He left the Brussels Normal School two years later and taught at Watermael-Boitsfort until 1928.

In 1927, Mombaerts competed in the I International Chopin Piano Competition in Warsaw. He was a finalist and was awarded an Honorable Mention. In the years following, he performed as a soloist throughout Europe and joined the Belgian Piano-String Quartet. He continued teaching at the Conservatory of La Louvière and also became a professor of piano at the Molenbeek School of Music in 1934. He was appointed by Queen Elisabeth of Belgium as a professor of piano at the Queen Elisabeth Music Chapel in Waterloo, Belgium.

After the German invasion of Belgium in 1940, Mombaerts fled to the United States with the Belgian Piano-String Quartet, which had been touring in Portugal. During the war, he taught at Colorado College from 1941 to 1943 before returning to Europe to serve in the Free Belgian forces until the end of the war. Afterwards, he performed across the U.S. and Canada with Scottish violinist William Primrose and as a soloist with several symphony orchestras. He taught at Emporia State University in Pittsburgh for a year at the conclusion of the war before spending two years as a professor of piano at the University of Kansas.

In 1948, he began teaching at Northwestern University. He became head of the piano department in 1957 and formed the Northwestern Trio with Ángel Reyes and Dudley Powers. He corresponded with notable musicians, including Henri Temianka, and retired in 1971. Notable students include Ralph Votapek, winner of the Van Cliburn International Piano Competition in 1962, and Nohema Fernández.

Mombaerts died in Evanston, Illinois in 1993, aged 90.
