= 42nd Directors Guild of America Awards =

- Date: March 10, 1990
- Location: The Beverly Hilton, Los Angeles, California; New York City
- Country: United States
- Presented by: Directors Guild of America

Highlights
- Best Director Feature Film: Born on the Fourth of July – Oliver Stone
- Website: https://www.dga.org/Awards/History/1980s/1989.aspx?value=1989

The 42nd Directors Guild of America Awards, honoring the outstanding directorial achievements in film and television in 1989, were presented on March 10, 1990, at the Beverly Hilton and in New York City. The feature film nominees were announced on January 30, 1990 and nominees in six television categories were announced on February 8, 1990.

== Winners and nominees ==
=== Film ===
Feature Film

Oliver Stone – Born on the Fourth of July

- Woody Allen – Crimes and Misdemeanors
- Rob Reiner – When Harry Met Sally...
- Phil Alden Robinson – Field of Dreams
- Peter Weir – Dead Poets Society

=== Television ===
Drama Series

Eric Laneuville – L.A. Law for "I'm in the Nude for Love"

- Gabrielle Beaumont – L.A. Law for "Lie Down and Deliver"
- Marshall Herskovitz – thirtysomething for "Love & Sex"
- John Pasquin – L.A. Law for "To Live and Diet in L.A."
Comedy Series

Barnet Kellman – Murphy Brown for "Brown Like Me"

- James Burrows – Cheers for "Sisterly Love"
- Harry Thomason – Designing Women for "They Shoot Fat Women, Don't They?"
Miniseries or TV Film

Dan Curtis – War and Remembrance

- Daniel Petrie – My Name Is Bill W.
- Simon Wincer – Lonesome Dove
Musical Variety

Don Mischer – Great Performances for "Gregory Hines: Tap Dance in America"

- Hal Gurnee – Late Night with David Letterman in Chicago
- Paul Flaherty – Billy Crystal: Midnight Train to Moscow
Daytime Drama

Victoria Hochberg – WonderWorks for "Jacob Have I Loved"

- Joanna Lee – ABC Afterschool Special for "My Dad Can't Be Crazy...Can He?"
- Richard Masur – ABC Afterschool Special for "Torn Between Two Fathers"
Documentary/Actuality

Peter Rosen – The Eighth Van Cliburn International Piano Competition: Here to Make Music

- Merrill Brockway – American Masters for "Stella Adler: Awake and Dream!"
- Gene Laski – American Masters for "W. Eugene Smith: Photography Made Difficult"
Sports

Robert Fishman – 1989 US Open

- Craig Janoff – 1989 World Series
- Edward Nathanson – Super Bowl XXIII

=== Commercials ===
Commercials

David Cornell – AT&T's "Small Town"

- Leslie Dektor – Pepsi's "Glasnost", International Cotton Association's "One Day", and United Airlines' "Speech"
- James Gartner – First City Texas' "Going Back to Work", Pizza Hut's "Right Field", and Barnett Bank's "World Series"
- Michael Grasso – Dr Pepper's "Baseball" and 7-Eleven's "Proposal" and "Small Businessmen"
- Richard Levine – Pepsi's "Missing Link" and "Two Michaels", and Sprint's "Trauma Unit"

=== D.W. Griffith Award ===
- Ingmar Bergman

=== Frank Capra Achievement Award ===
- Stanley Ackerman

=== Robert B. Aldrich Service Award ===
- George Schaefer

=== Honorary Life Member ===
- Barry Diller
- Elliot Silverstein
- Sidney Sheinberg
