= Petronel Malan =

South African musician (born 1977)

Petronel Malan, born in Pretoria, South Africa is a South African concert pianist based in the United States.

Triple Grammy-nominated South African pianist Petronel Malan is an exclusive recording artist for the internationally recognized label Hänssler Classic based in Germany. Her debut disc Transfigured Bach: The Complete Bach Transcriptions of Bartok, Lipatti and Ignaz Friedman, was nominated for three Grammy awards, including "Best Instrumental Solo Album." The album was on the Top-10 list for Classic FM for over 30 weeks and was met with critical and audience appeal alike. Her second recording in the series "Transfigured Mozart," was released in 2006 during a 15-concert tour of South Africa, to commemorate the 250th anniversary of Mozart's birth. "Transfigured Beethoven" was released in 2008. "Transfigured Tchaikovsky" (2012) included the lieder transcriptions of Isaac Mikhnovsky. In 2015, she released "Transfigured Brahms" which included world premiere transcriptions by American composer Lowell Liebermann. As a Blüthner Artist she uses the pianos exclusively for her recordings.

== Background ==
Born in South Africa, of 1688 French Huguenot descent, she started piano lessons with her mother, an opera singer, at age four. Considered the "last prodigy" of the late South African pedagogue Adolph Hallis, she debuted with the Johannesburg Symphony at the age of ten. Malan won her first national gold medal at age twelve (ATKV Prelude Competitions) and her first international gold at age fourteen at the Third International Piano Competition in Marsala, Sicily. After winning every competition she was eligible to enter in South Africa, she emerged as the top South African pianist of her generation when she became the youngest person ever to win the coveted SABC Music Prize Competition. She relocated to the United States to pursue her career.

== Career ==
She continued her studies under Joseph Stanford, Steven De Groote, Ralph Votapek and Earl Wild. Petronel completed both her Master of Music and Doctor of Musical Arts degrees at the University of North Texas College of Music, studying with Joseph Banowetz.

Following her European debut in Rome in 1988, she has continued to make orchestral, recital and chamber music appearances on four continents. Highlights include prestigious venues such as Carnegie Recital Hall, Salle Cortot and Théâtre du Châtelet (Paris), Mozarteum concert hall (Salzburg), Liszt Museum (Budapest), Kravis Center (West Palm Beach), Orchestra Hall (Chicago) and Bass Hall (Fort Worth) and venues in St. Petersburg, Russia. Festival appearances include the Gilmore Piano Festival, Jasper Music Festival, Great Romantics Festival, Ravinia Festival, Levočské Babie Leto festival (Slovakia), and Music in the Mountains Festival in Colorado. She has worked with conductors like Vasily Petrenko, Bernhard Gueller, Karina Canellakis, Daniel Boico, Dmitry Manilov, Omri Hadari, Yashima Takeda, Bernhard Gueller and Fuzao Kajima. Broadcasts for television, radio and the web include live performances in Europe, Canada, across the US (also on NPR) and several documentary television-profiles in South Africa.

She maintains a full performing schedule across the world as a recitalist, orchestral soloist and chamber musician. She frequently judges piano competitions, conducts master classes and presents lectures across the United States and South Africa.

== Awards ==
In 2000, four gold medals were awarded to her at the Louise McMahon International Music Competition, the Missouri Southern International Piano Competition the Hilton Head International Piano Competition and the Los Angeles Liszt Competition "Budapest Concert." She was also a grand prizewinner in the 2000 Web Concert Hall Competition and gold medalist in the Young Texas Artist Competition and the Grace Welsh Piano Prize, to name but a few.

In 2003, she was awarded the national "Rapport/City Press Prestige Award" as one of the "10 Most Inspirational Women Achievers" in South Africa.

In 2006, she received the Kanna Award for her sold-out performances at the KKNK Oudtshoorn. The Kannas are also called the "Karoo Oscars."

In 2012 she received the Young Alumni Award from the University of North Texas.

In 2013 she was awarded The American Prize for her recording "Transfigured Tchaikovsky."

In 2014 KykNet Fiesta Award. Given to the best live performance at a national arts festival; Category: Classical Music.

== Recordings on Blüthner ==
Ms. Malan is a Blüthner Concert Artist, and uses these instruments exclusively for her recordings. She owns several pianos, including a concert size Blüthner.

== General ==
Petronel Malan has appeared on magazine covers, as a picture-clue in crossword puzzles, and made regular charity appearances when in South Africa. Her stage wardrobe is designed by South African designers. A supporter of classical music in schools, she finds time in her touring schedule to visit schools and speak to students about classical music.

Her sister is famous actress and business woman, Annie Malan.

Petronel lives in the United States.

== See also ==
- List of classical pianists
- Blüthner
