= Andrew Wilde =

Andrew Wilde is the name of:

- Andrew Wilde (pianist) (born 1965), English classical pianist
- Andrew Wilde (actor), English actor
