= Mariya Gambaryan =

Russian music educator (born 1925)

Mariya Stepanovna Gambaryan (Yerevan, 1 October 1925) is a Russian pianist.

She studied until 1948 in the Moscow Conservatoire under Konstantin Igumnov, who took pride in shaping her artistic personality, followed by postgraduate studies in the Moscow Conservatory under Heinrich Neuhaus, Abram Shatskes, and Lev Oborin. She taught in the Leningrad Conservatory from 1956, and in the Gnessin College after moving to Moscow in 1960. There she taught for most of her life, until 2017. She received the Honored Artist of the Armenian RSS and the Russian Federation medals in 1966 and 2005 respectively, as well as the Movses Khorenatsi medal in 2016.

== Premieres ==
Date	Venue	Composer	Composition	Orchestra	Conductor	Source
1967	Moscow	Sofia Gubaidulina	Piano Sonata			
