= American Piano Awards =

Non-profit performing arts organization

- Formation: 1979; 47 years ago by Victor Borge, Tony Habig, and Julius Bloom
- Purpose: Discover, promote and advance the careers of young, American, world-class jazz and classical pianists
- Headquarters: 4603 Clarendon Road, Suite 030, Indianapolis, IN 46208
- Location: Indianapolis, Indiana, United States
- Region served: United States
- President & CEO: Chris Williams
- Current Classical Winner: Michael Davidman
- Current Jazz Winner: Isaiah J. Thompson
- Main organ: Board of Directors
- Website: pianoawards.org
- Formerly called: The Beethoven Foundation (1979-1989), American Pianists Association (1989-2024)

American Piano Awards is a non-profit performing arts organization based in Indianapolis, Indiana. The organization's goal is to "discover, promote, and advance" the careers of young American pianists. The organization hosts a biennial competition called the American Piano Awards, which switches focus from classical piano to jazz piano every two years. Valued at over $200,000, the awards of the competition are among the most lucrative piano prizes in the world. The Cole Porter Fellowship, awarded to the winner of the jazz competitions, is one of the greatest honors young American jazz musicians can receive. In non-competition years, the organization hosts a piano recital series, and from 2003 through 2008, the organization produced Indy Jazz Fest.

== History ==
The organization was "born" in New York City in 1979 as the Beethoven Foundation, conceived by Danish pianist Victor Borge, Tony Habig of the piano manufacturer Kimball International, and Julius Bloom, former general manager of Carnegie Hall. Their original intent was to help identify and develop young American pianists to compete in international piano competitions by offering fellowships over a three-year period that included cash awards, concerts and media coverage. In 1982, The Beethoven Foundation moved its national headquarters to Indianapolis, Indiana due to its central location and Habig & Borge's geographical ties to the area.

In 1989 the organization was renamed as The American Pianists Association to reflect a broader mission and scope that included jazz pianists. The jazz competition was added in 1992.

The organization was rebranded as American Piano Awards in 2024 to better reflect its most significant programs and aid in the public's understanding of its mission and purpose. The executive offices are a part of the Arts Collaborative housed in Lilly Hall at Butler University.

== Competitions ==
Finalists for the American Piano Awards compete through a series of adjudicated public recitals. The classical competition includes solo piano, chamber music, and concerto performances and ends with each finalist performing a piano concerto with the Indianapolis Symphony Orchestra. The jazz competition includes repertoire for solo piano, jazz trio, vocal jazz, and jazz orchestra.

== Award recipients ==
The American Piano Awards website lists these winners:

Year	Winner	Winner	Winner
2025 Classical	Michael Davidman		
2023 Jazz	Isaiah J. Thompson		
2021 Classical	Kenneth Broberg		
2019 Jazz	Emmet Cohen		
2017 Classical	Drew Petersen		
2015 Jazz	Sullivan Fortner		
2013 Classical	Sean Chen		
2011 Jazz	Aaron Diehl		
2009 Classical	Grace Fong	Adam Golka	
2007 Jazz	Dan Tepfer		
2006 Classical	Stephen Beus	Spencer Myer	
2004 Jazz	Adam Birnbaum		
2003 Classical	Thomas Rosenkranz	Michael Sheppard	
2001 Jazz	Aaron Parks		
2000 Classical	Christopher Taylor	Ning An	
1998 Jazz	Jesse Green		
1997 Classical	Derison Duarte	Hiroko Kunitake	Peter Miyamoto
1996 Jazz	Rick Germanson		
1995 Classical	James Giles	Anthony Molinaro	J.Y. Song
1994 Jazz	Kevin Bales		
1993 Classical	Adam Kent	Nicholas Roth	Lori Sims
1992 Jazz	Jim Pryor		
1991 Classical	Timothy Bozarth	Anthony Padilla	Daniel Shapiro
1989 Classical	Jonathan Bass	Brian Ganz	Stephen Prutsman
1987 Classical	Diane Hidy	Philip Hosford	Nelson Padgett
1985 Classical	Frederic Chiu	R. Clipper Erickson	Dmitry Rachmanov
1983 Classical	Phillip Bush	John Salmon	Michael Lewin
1981 Classical	David Buechner	Glenn Sales	Jonathan Shames
