= Nohema Fernández =

American pianist (born 1944)

Nohema Fernández (born May 23, 1944) is a Cuban-born American pianist.

== Early life and education ==
Born in Havana, Fernández began her formal musical studies with famed teacher César Pérez Sentenat, continuing later with María Jones de Castro at the Conservatorio Internacional in that city, She played several recitals between the ages of 11 and 16, and then debuted at the Teatro Nacional when she was sixteen years old. With her brother José Pedro she came to the United States via Operation Peter Pan, arriving in 1961; their parents followed them nearly a year later. She continued her musical studies in the United States. She received a Bachelor of Music in piano from DePaul University in 1965 and received a Master of Music, also in piano, from Northwestern University the following year. In 1983 she received a Doctor of Musical Arts from Stanford University. Among her teachers were Gui Mombaerts, Adolph Baller and Vronsky & Babin.

== Career ==
Her American debut came in 1987 at the Weill Recital Hall in Carnegie Hall. During her career she has performed throughout the United States and Europe, appearing in such venues as the Concertgebouw Klein Zaal in Amsterdam, Reid Hall in Edinburgh, and the Brahmssaal of the Musikverein in Vienna. She has performed as soloist with orchestras throughout the United States, including the Owensboro, Tucson, Chattanooga, Grand Junction, Billings, Olympia, Saginaw, and Dubuque symphony orchestras. In Seoul, she recorded Mômo Precoce (H. Villalobos) in a live concert with the Seoul Philharmonic. A noted champion of piano music by Spanish and Latin American composers, she received the NEA Solo Recitalist Fellowship in 1989 and La Rosa Blanca from the Patronato José Martí (Los Angeles) in 1996.

From 1990 to 2001 Fernández was a professor of music in the School of Music and Dance at the University of Arizona; in 2000 she was named interim head of the media arts department in the College of Fine Arts at that institution. She served as the Dean of the Claire Trevor School of the Arts at the University of California, Irvine from 2003 to 2008 before retiring.

== In film ==
A recording by Fernández of the Berceuse Campesina by Alejandro García Caturla was included in the soundtrack of the film The Lost City at the request of its director, Andy García.
