= Konstantin Igumnov =

Russian pianist

Konstantin Igumnov Константин Игумнов
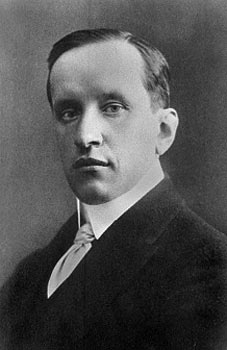

Background information
- Born: May 1, 1873 [O.S. April 19] Lebedyan, Tambov Governorate, Russian Empire
- Died: March 24, 1948 (aged 74) Moscow, Russian SFSR, Soviet Union
- Genres: Classical
- Occupations: Pianist; music pedagogue
- Instrument: Piano

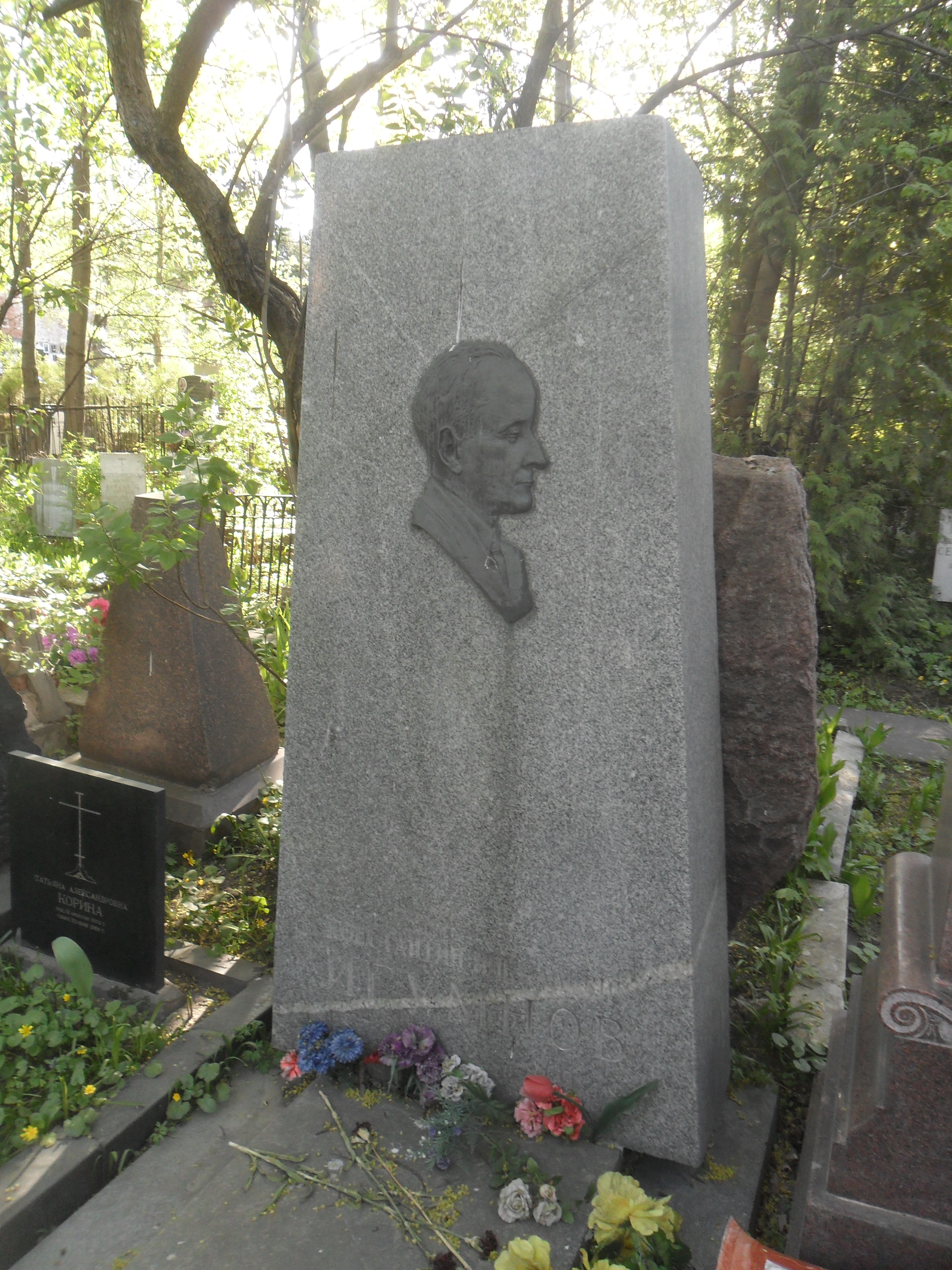
Grave at Novodevichy Cemetery. In 1973, a gravestone was installed, designed by architect E. N. Chechik.

Konstantin Nikolayevich Igumnov (Note: Russian: Константин Николаевич Игумнов, romanized: Konstantin Nikolayevich Igumnov) (May 1, 1873 [O.S. April 19] – March 24, 1948) was a Soviet and Russian pianist and pedagogue. In 1946, he was recognized as the People's Artist of the USSR.

== Biography ==
Igumnov studied under Nikolai Zverev, and at Moscow Conservatory under Alexander Siloti and Pavel Pabst. He took theory and composition courses from Sergei Taneyev, Anton Arensky and Mikhail Ippolitov-Ivanov. In 1898-9 he was pianoforte teacher at the Tiflis music-school of the Russian Musical Society. From 1899 he was a professor at the Moscow Conservatory, where his life's work was carried out. He recorded 6 pieces on piano roll for the Welte-Mignon reproducing piano in 1910.

Among his many students were Abram Shatskes, Arno Babajanian, Bolesław Kon, Naum Shtarkman, Elena Beckman-Shcherbina, Yakov Flier, Boris Berlin, Lev Oborin, Maria Grinberg, Andrzej Wasowski, Elena Laumenskienė, Ryszard Bakst, Tengiz Amirejibi, Anatoly Alexandrov, Bella Davidovich, Rosa Tamarkina, Issay Dobrowen, and Mariya Gambaryan.

Igumnov was evacuated to Yerevan, Armenia during the first half of 1940s. During those years he taught at the local Conservatory, where his 70th birthday was widely celebrated.

A four-record (LP) set of Igumnov's recordings was issued by Melodiya on 33C 10-05519-26.

== Honours and awards ==
- Order of the Red Banner of Labour (1937)
- People's Artist of the RSFSR (1941)
- Order of Lenin (1945)
- People's Artist of the USSR (1946)
- Stalin Prize (1946)
- Medal "For Valiant Labour in the Great Patriotic War 1941–1945"
- Medal "In Commemoration of the 800th Anniversary of Moscow"

== Welte-Mignon Piano Rolls ==
- Catalog no. 2061: Rachmaninoff - Prelude, Op. 23, No. 1, F-sharp
- Catalog no. 2062: Rachmaninoff - Prelude, Op. 23, No. 6, E-flat
- Catalog no. 2063: Scriabin - Sonata-Fantasie, Op. 19, No. 2, G-sharp
- Catalog no. 2064: Brahms - Intermezzo, Op. 118, No. 6, E-flat
- Catalog no. 2065: Rachmaninoff - "Fantasy Pieces", Op. 3, No. 2, C-sharp: Prelude
- Catalog no. 2066: Arensky - By the Seashore, Op. 52, No. 4, G-flat

== Sources ==
- A. Eaglefield-Hull, A Dictionary of Modern Music and Musicians (Dent, London 1924).
- J. Methuen-Campbell, Chopin Playing from the Composer to the Present Day (Gollancz, London 1981).
