= Abram Shatskes =

Russian pianist and teacher (1900–1961)

Abram Shatskes Абрам Шацкес
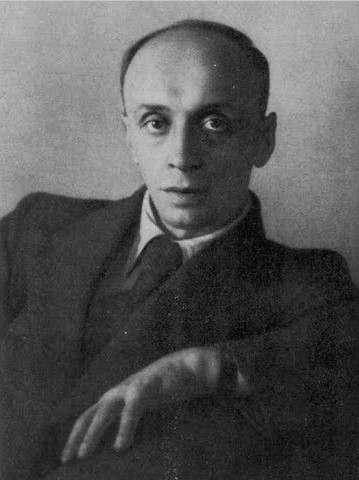

Background information
- Born: August 13, 1900; Vilnius, Russian Empire
- Died: February 4, 1961 (aged 60) Moscow, Soviet Union
- Education: Moscow Conservatory
- Years active: 1923–1961

Abram Vladimirovich Shatskes (/ˈʃætskɪs/ SHAHTS-kyis; August 13 [O.S. July 31] 1900 – February 4, 1961) was a Soviet pianist and professor at the Moscow Conservatory. A student of Nikolai Medtner, he recorded and helped popularize Medtner's compositions in post-war Russia.

== Early life and education ==
Shatskes was born in Vilnius in the Russian Empire (present-day Lithuania) to an Ashkenazi Jewish family in 1900. His father Wulf Shmuelevich Shatskes (born 1865) was originally from Grodno, Belarus, and his mother Rokhli-Yudes Abramovna (née Shtuzer; born 1867) was from Paberžė, a village outside of Vilnius. After the German invasion of Lithuania during World War I, the family fled to Moscow.

He studied piano at the Moscow Conservatory under Nikolai Medtner and Karl Kipp, graduating with a gold medal in 1923. After a number of notable musicians including Sergei Rachmaninoff and Medtner left the Soviet Union, he continued his postgraduate studies under Konstantin Igumnov until 1928.

== Career ==
Shatskes was active as a concert pianist in the 1920s and 1930s. He gained acclaim in Paris substituting Alfred Cortot as the accompanist of Russian mezzo-soprano Maria Olenina-d'Alheim (1869–1970), who helped introduce the music of Modest Mussorgsky and Mily Balakirev to French audiences.

He was particularly noted for his promotion and interpretation of Medtner's compositions, and his repertoire included all of his teacher's main piano works. In the late 1940s, he was censured under the Zhdanov Doctrine for performing the works of an émigré composer. After the Khrushchev thaw, Shatskes played a leading role in reviving interest in Medtner's music. He recorded the 1st and 2nd Piano Concertos with the USSR State Symphony Orchestra under the direction of Yevgeny Svetlanov.

He began teaching at the Moscow Conservatory in 1928. He became an associate professor three years later and a full professor in 1935. Among his most notable students are Mariya Gambaryan, Ilze Graubiņa, Anna Kantor, and Eteri Mgaloblishvili.

Shatskes joined the Communist Party of the Soviet Union in 1940. During World War II, as chairman of the military patronage commission at the conservatory, he organized more than 4,000 concerts for Soviet soldiers, including more than half at the front lines.

He died in Moscow in 1961, aged 60. He was buried at the Donskoye Cemetery.

== Personal life ==
Shatskes married Esther Fyodorovna Sumter, a pianist and graduate of the Moscow Conservatory who studied under Samuil Feinberg. Their son Boris (1931–1985) was a Russian chess player, pianist, and Master of Sports of the USSR who died in a vehicle accident, aged 54.
