= Vilmos Szabadi =

Hungarian musician (born 1959)

Vilmos Szabadi (born 1959) is a Hungarian violinist who has enjoyed an international reputation since the 1980s.

In 2020 the ‘Artist of Merit’ prize was given to him by the Hungarian Government. In 2018 the Bartók-Pásztory prize was awarded him. He is the double prize winner (1999, 2002) of the prestigious MIDEM Festival in Cannes, FRANCE. “PRIMA”, Franz Liszt, HUNGAROTON prized artist. Head of Violin Department of the Liszt Ferenc Academy of Music, Budapest. So far 59 CDs were released by his contribution, mainly by HUNGAROTON record company. He is invited whole over the world giving master classes as Tokyo, Helsinki, Austria, Singapore and USA etc. In the previous years he is steady Jury members of leading international violin competitions. Szabadi studied under Professor Ferenc Halász at the Franz Liszt Academy of Music in Budapest where on receiving his diploma, he became the youngest-ever member to join the teaching staff. Then he studied, after graduation, with Sándor Végh, Ruggiero Ricci and Loránt Fenyves. In 1982 he won first prize (with special mention) in the Hungarian Radio Violin Competition and the following year in the Jenő Hubay competition in Budapest. In 1985 Szabadi was awarded third prize at the international Jean Sibelius Violin Competition in Finland where he has since been invited to perform regularly and to give master classes.

His career as an international concert violinist took off when Sir Georg Solti invited him to play Bartók's 2nd Violin Concerto during a Bartók Festival at the Royal Festival Hall in London in 1988. The success of the concert (which was recorded by Philips), led to invitations from the Royal Philharmonic Orchestra, the BBC Philharmonic and the RTÉ Concert Orchestra. Szabadi was among the musicians invited by Prince Charles to perform at the celebration in honour of Sir Georg Solti's 80th birthday held at Buckingham Palace in 1992.

He has played in the following countries;

- Austria: Wiener Konzerthaus, Musikverein, Linz, Graz
- Belgium: Brussels- Theatre St.Michel
- Cyprus: Ledra Music Soloists International Chamber Music Festibal, Nicosia
- England: London- Wigmore Hall, Barbican Centre, and Royal Festival Hall; Manchester- Royal Northern College of Music
- Wales:Cardiff- St. David's Hall
- Ireland: Belfast- Ulster Hall; Dublin- National Concert Hall
- France: Paris- Châtelet, Conservatoire
- Russia: Moscow, St.Petersburg
- Netherlands: Amsterdam- Concertgebouw
- Italy: Turin- RAI Auditorium
- Spain: Madrid- Auditorio Nacional, Zaragoza, Valladolid
- Germany: Stuttgart- Liederhalle (Mozart/Beethoven Halls), München, Hamburg
- Finland: Helsinki- Finlandia Hall

, Turku, Tampere, Kuopio, Kajaani, Lappeenranta etc.

- USA: New York, Washington, Indianapolis, Cleveland
- Canada: Toronto, Montreal
- Israel: Tel-Aiv, Jerusalem
- Lebanon
- South Korea: Seoul, Busan
- Taiwan: Taipei

Conductors with whom he has appeared include Simonov, Ceccato, Nelson, Gardelli, Tabachnik, Loughran, Berglund, Renzetti, Kamu, Haenchen, Vásáry, Kobajashi, Adam and Ivan Fisher. He has recorded for the BBC, Radio Classique (France), NDR (North German Radio), BRD (Bavarian Radio), Irish Radio, and many other radio and TV stations.

== Discography ==
He is the double prize-winner (1999, 2002) of the MIDEM Festival in Cannes, France, where the international jury chose the Szabadi recording of Dohnányi Violin Concertos, and the complete Bartók edition (issued by Hungaroton, the Hungarian record company) which includes Szabadi's version of the early Bartók violin sonata. So far he has recorded 58 CDs / LPs / CDVs for several companies. From 1996 he has been the only violinist in Hungary to be contracted as an exclusive artist for the Hungaroton Classic record label. In 1999 the Hungaroton Prize was awarded to him.

== Instrument ==
Szabadi usually plays an instrument on loan from the Hungarian state collection - a Lorenzo Storioni violin made in Cremona in 1778. However, in 1995 he appeared in a "Stradivarius Series" in Madrid, playing one of the Stradivarius set housed in the Royal Palace (Palacio Real).

== Chamber music ==
In 1995 Szabadi established, as Artistic Director, a chamber music festival in Keszthely, a resort on Lake Balaton. He still teaches at Keszthely but the festival moved to the baroque palace at Gödöllő near Budapest. In 1999 he co-founded the Vienna Belvedere Trio with artists from the Vienna Philharmonic Orchestra: the following year the trio made its debut in the hall of the Musikverein to critical acclaim.

In 2006 Szabadi marked the Mozart anniversary with a number of concerts featuring works by that composer. In Manchester he played the violin sonatas with Andrew Wilde (pianist).
