= Adam Birnbaum =

American jazz pianist, composer, arranger (born 1979)

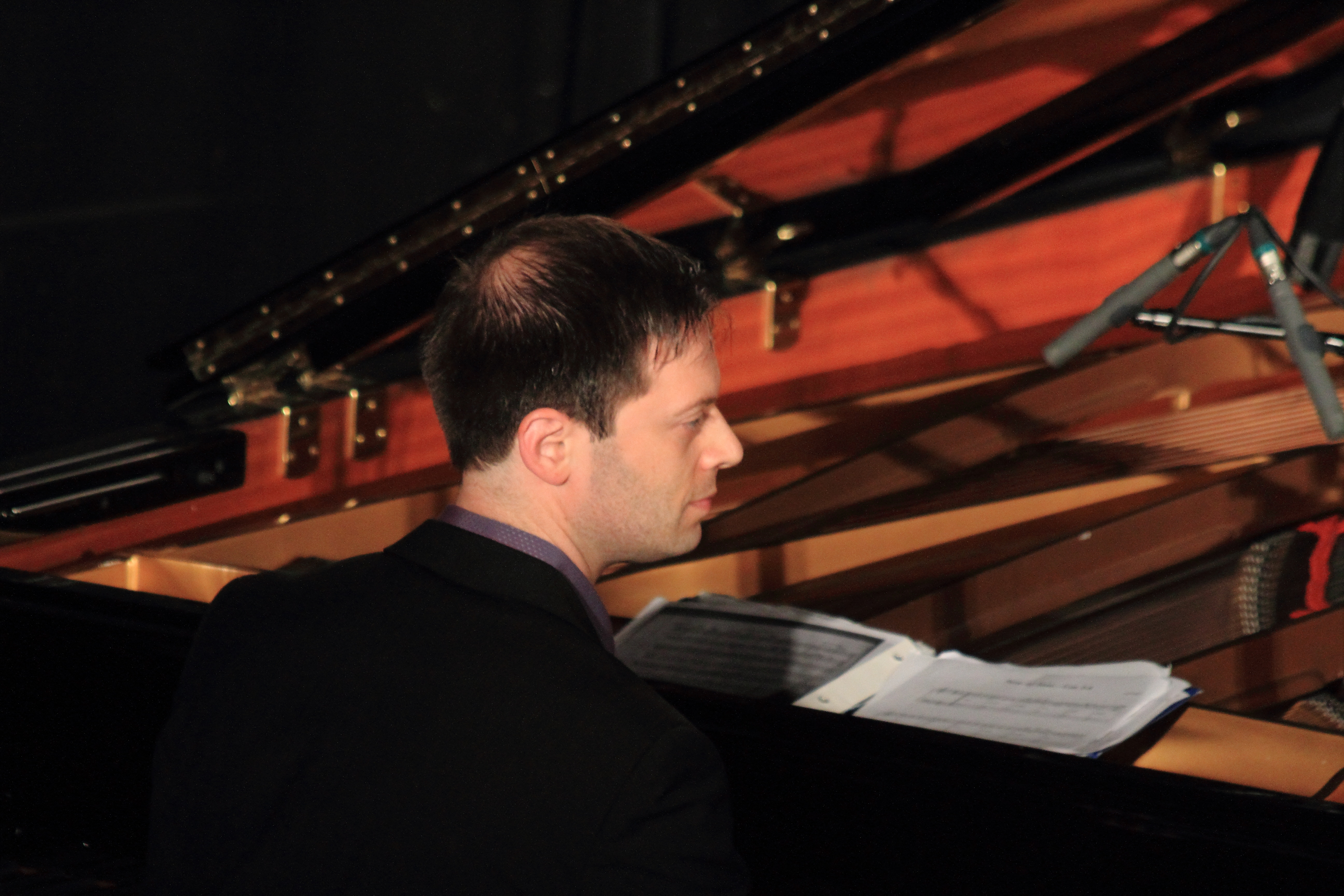
- At INNtöne Jazzfestival, Austria, 2016

Background information
- Born: 1979 (age 46–47); Boston, Massachusetts, U.S.
- Genre: Jazz
- Occupations: Musician, composer, arranger
- Instrument: Piano
- Years active: 2000s–present
- Website: adambirnbaum.com

Adam Birnbaum (born 1979) is an American jazz pianist, composer, and arranger. He was the winner of the 2004 American Piano Awards Cole Porter Fellowship in Jazz.

== Life and career ==
Birnbaum was born in 1979 in Boston, Massachusetts. He studied "music theory, chamber music, and classical and jazz performance" at the New England Conservatory of Music's Preparatory School. He graduated from Boston College in 2001, and went on to study at the Juilliard School. In 2004, he won the American Piano Awards Cole Porter Fellowship in Jazz. Birnbaum toured Japan and South Korea in 2008 as part of the Juilliard Jazz All-Stars.

In 2008 Birnbaum received a Chamber Music America grant to compose music for a piano trio. From around 2009 Birnbaum has been part of drummer Al Foster's quartet. He is also the piano teacher of many, including Noah Rosen

== Playing style ==
The DownBeat reviewer of Birnbaum's 2015 album Three of a Mind commented that the pianist "has a light touch, with playing that dances over the bars. He favors major keys, and his lyricism seems to sparkle".

== Discography ==
An asterisk (*) indicates that the year is that of release.

=== As leader/co-leader ===
Year recorded	Title	Label	Personnel/Notes
2006*	Ballade pour Adeline	Pony Canyon	Trio, with Matt Brewer (bass), Quincy Davis (drums)
2006*	A Comme Amour	Pony Canyon	Trio, with Ben Wolfe (bass), Rodney Green (drums)
2008*	Travels	Smalls	Trio, with Joe Sanders (bass), Rodney Green (drums)
2015*	Three of a Mind	Daedalus	Trio, with Doug Weiss (bass), Al Foster (drums)
2023	Preludes	Chelsea Music Festival	Trio, with Matt Clohesy (bass), Keita Ogawa (percussion)

=== As sideman ===
Year recorded	Leader	Title	Label
2003	Dominick Farinacci	Say It	M&I
2004*	JoJo David	Small Hours	CDBaby
2004*	Dominick Farinacci	Besame Mucho	M&I
2008*	Greg Osby	9 Levels	Inner Circle
