= Tengiz Amirejibi =

Musician

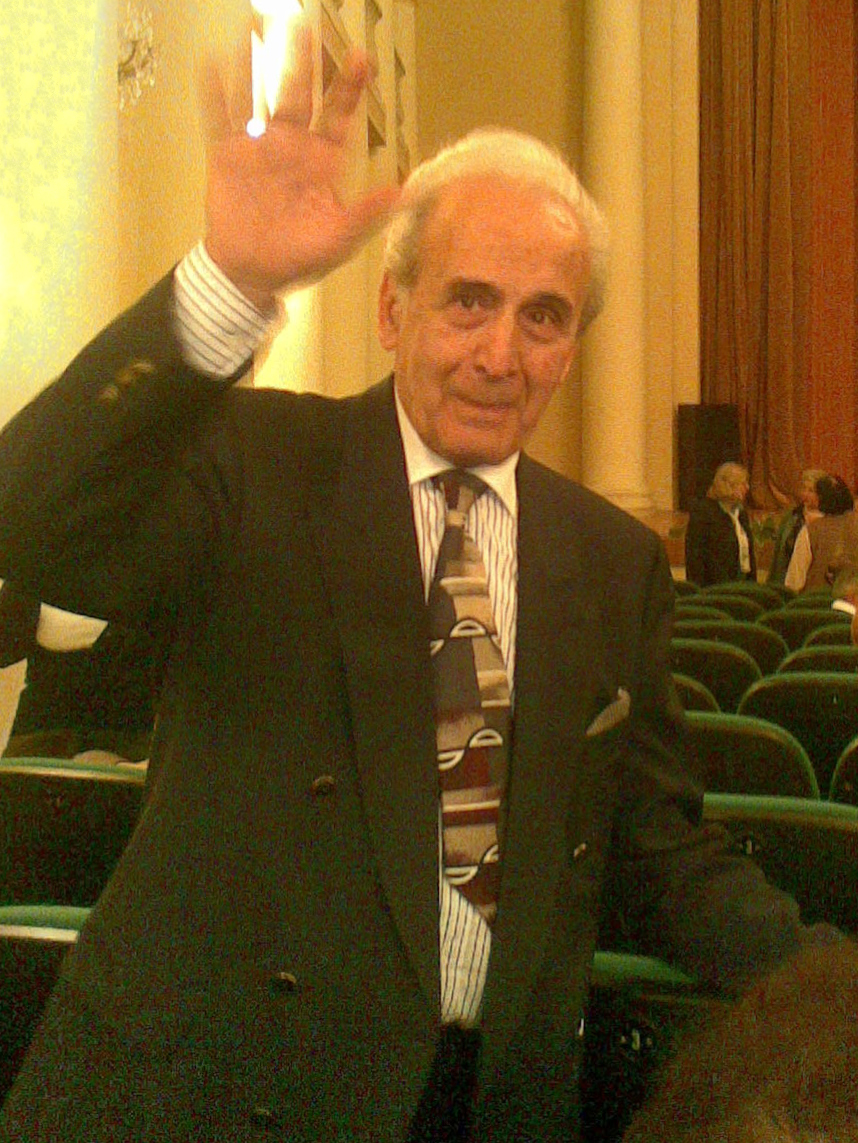

Background information
- Born: 30 September 1927; Tbilisi, Transcaucasian SFSR, Soviet Union
- Died: 9 March 2013 (aged 85)
- Instrument: Piano
- Years active: 1960–2013

Tengiz (Gizi) Amirejibi (Georgian: თენგიზ (გიზი) ამირეჯიბი) (30 September 1927, Tbilisi – 9 March 2013) was a Georgian pianist best known for his interpretations of Chopin.

== Life ==
He was a professor emeritus at the Tbilisi Ivane Sarajishvili State Conservatoire from 1960 to his death in 2013.

Amirejibi received the title of Peoples’ artist of Georgia in 1961.

== Competition ==
The Tengiz Amirejibi Borjomi International piano Competition was founded in 2015.

A founder and an artistic director of the Competition is a renowned Georgian pianist Tamar Licheli. The first two competitions were held nationwide, but due to the great interest and high number of the contestants, the competition became international in 2017. Jury members of the competition throughout the years were such world renowned, famous musicians like Liana Isakadze, Alexander Korsantia, Sergei Babayan, Miwa Hoyano and others.

The Competition is held in 4 age categories. The Age limit is from 6 to 25 and is open for pianists of all nationalities.
