= Grace Fong =

American academic and pianist

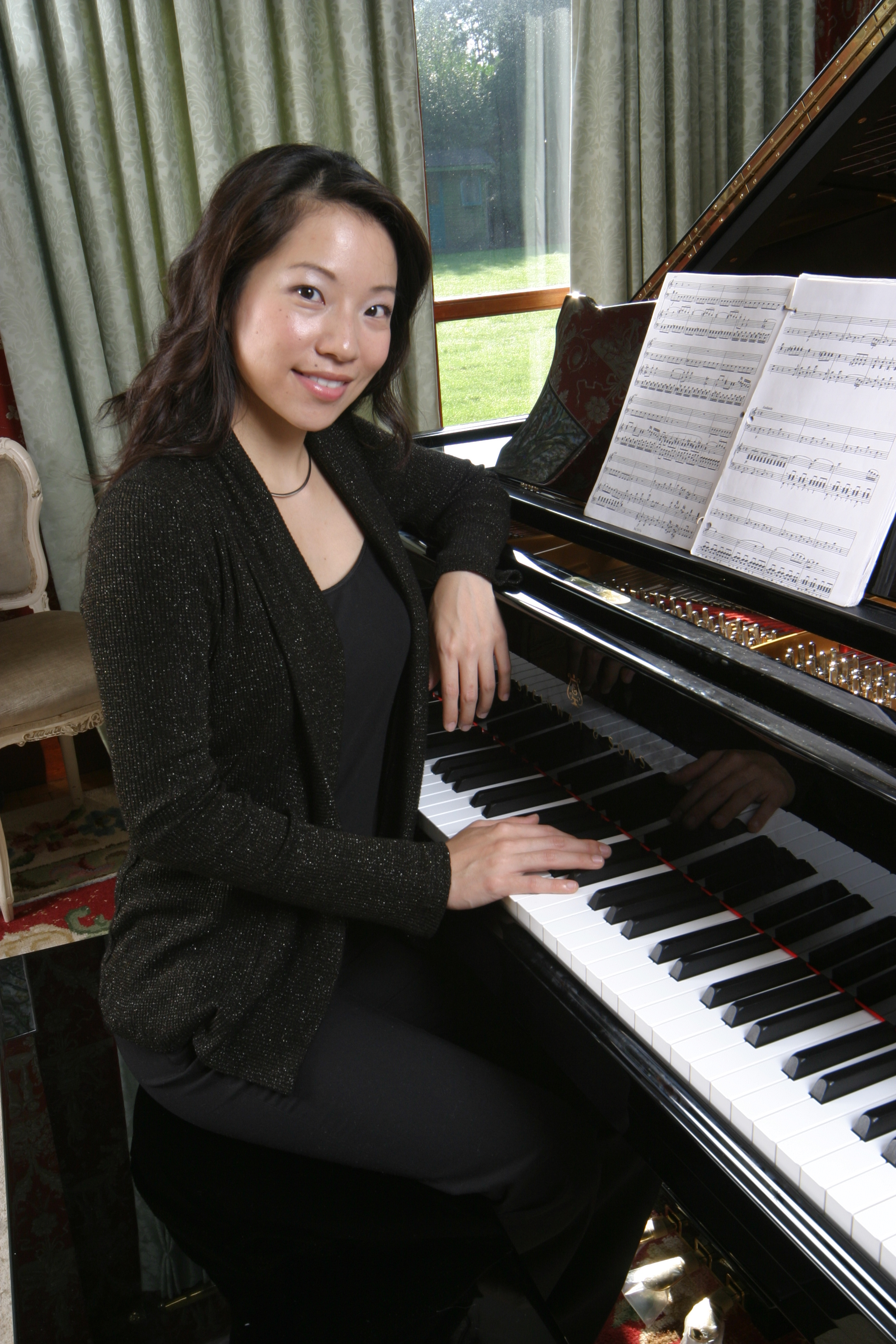
Grace Fong (2006)

Grace Fong is an American musician who is Director of Keyboard Studies at Chapman University Conservatory of Music and has an active solo and chamber music career. She also performs as part of the Selvaggi Trio.

== Biography ==
Fong grew up in Bakersfield, California, to a Taiwanese American family. Her parents are immigrants from Taiwan. During the course of her undergraduate studies at the University of Southern California, Fong completed a double major and minor; she was awarded the Renaissance Scholar Prize, and was named "The USC Thornton School of Music Keyboard Department’s — Most Outstanding Student B.M." Fong is a graduate of the Cleveland Institute of Music where she studied with Sergei Babayan.

Fong placed 6th in the 2006 Leeds International Piano Competition in the United Kingdom, 2nd in the 2007 Bosendorfer International Piano Competition, shared 3rd prize with Michael Mizrahi at the 2006 San Antonio International Piano Competition, and was the Baroque Prize recipient at the 2005 Cleveland International Piano Competition.

Fong was named a finalist of the 2008-2009 Classical Fellowship Awards of the American Piano Awards, and invited to perform a series of concerts by the APA. She later was the 2002 Gold Medalist for the Wideman International Piano Competition. Other prizes include the winner of the 2002 Music Academy of the West Concerto Competition, the winner of the 2002 Cleveland Institute of Music Concerto Competition, 1st Prize in the 2000 Los Angeles International Liszt Competition, and 1st Prize in the 2000 Edith Knox Performance Competition.
