= Steven De Groote =

South African classical pianist (1953–1989)

Background information
- Born: 12 January 1953; Johannesburg, South Africa
- Died: 22 May 1989 (aged 36) Johannesburg, South Africa
- Genre: Classical
- Occupations: Pianist, pedagogue
- Instrument: Piano

Steven De Groote (12 January 1953 – 22 May 1989) was a South African classical pianist.

Steven De Groote was born in Johannesburg, South Africa, into a Belgian family in which, for three generations, almost every member had been a professional musician. His grandmother was a recipient of the Prix de Rome in Belgium, and his father was the conductor of the Cape Town University Symphony. As a youngster, De Groote toured South Africa performing trios with his father on violin and brother on cello.

== Training and early competitions ==
He trained with Lamar Crowson in Cape Town, and with Eduardo del Pueyo at the Royal Conservatory of Music in Brussels, graduating in 1971 with first prize in piano.

In 1972, De Groote entered the Curtis Institute of Music in Philadelphia where he studied with Rudolf Serkin, Mieczysław Horszowski, and Seymour Lipkin. He graduated in 1975.

In 1976, De Groote took honours in the Leventritt Competition in New York City. In May 1977, he won the Young Concert Artists International Auditions in New York. In September of that year, he was awarded the Grand Prize at the Van Cliburn Competition in Fort Worth, Texas. In that same competition, he also took prizes for Best Performance of a Commissioned Work and Best Performance of Chamber Music, the only winner in the history of the competition to take all prizes.

== Professional career ==
He gave his New York debut recital on 8 November 1977 at the 92nd Street Y. His Van Cliburn Prize Carnegie Hall debut recital was held on 12 December 1977.

After winning the Van Cliburn, De Groote's international career took him all over the world. In the United States, he performed with orchestras such as the National Symphony Orchestra in Washington DC, the Baltimore Symphony Orchestra, the Boston Symphony Orchestra, the Chicago Symphony Orchestra, the Cleveland Orchestra, the Dallas Symphony Orchestra, the Denver Symphony Orchestra, the Detroit Symphony Orchestra, the Minnesota Orchestra and the Philadelphia Orchestra; in Canada, the Montreal Symphony Orchestra; in Europe, the Royal Concertgebouw Orchestra in Amsterdam, the Rotterdam Philharmonic Orchestra, the Mozarteum Orchestra of Salzburg, the Helsinki Philharmonic Orchestra, and the Bamberg Symphony Orchestra, the Orchestre National de France, and the Deutsches Symphonie-Orchester Berlin, the Southwest German Radio Symphony Orchestra (Baden-Baden), the Württemberg Chamber Orchestra Heilbronn and in Britain, with nearly all the major British orchestras.

His debut, in 1981, at The Proms, playing Gershwin's Concerto in F with Andrew Litton conducting the Royal Philharmonic Orchestra, was televised live by the BBC.

In 1983-1984, he toured the US as a soloist with the Warsaw Philharmonic conducted by Kazimierz Kord, and, in 1987, England with the Mozarteum Orchestra of Salzburg conducted by Hans Graf.

He worked with such distinguished conductors as Gerd Albrecht, Serge Baudo, Edo de Waart, Charles Dutoit, Jörg Faerber, Michael Gielen, Günther Herbig, Eugen Jochum, Bernard Klee, Kiril Kondrashin, Andrew Litton, Lorin Maazel, Karl Münchinger, Eugene Ormandy, Klaus Tennstedt, Antoni Wit, and David Zinman.

In 1988, Steven returned to his native South Africa to tour with the Cape Town Symphony Orchestra on their international tour to the Republic of China on Taiwan. This tour was in recognition of the orchestra's 75th anniversary season and was conducted by David de Villiers. Steven performed in Cape Town, Johannesburg, Taipei, Taichung and Kaohsiung with the orchestra. During this tour, he performed Rachmaninov's 2nd Piano Concerto, Beethoven's Concerto No. 4, and Brahms Concerto No. 2. Recordings of these live concerts are available on the Fidelio label.

An accomplished chamber musician, he regularly partnered leading chamber ensembles such as the Guarneri Quartet and the Chilingirian Quartet (in which his brother Philip was the cellist).

== Teaching ==
In 1981, he joined the faculty of Arizona State University and divided his time between performing and teaching. In 1987, he succeeded Lili Kraus as artist-in-residence at Texas Christian University in Fort Worth. In April that year, he was honoured by the Texas Senate for his 'outstanding contribution to music', in a resolution expressing the Senate's 'highest regard and admiration for him'.

== Piloting ==
De Groote was an amateur pilot. In 1985, he survived a severe crash while attempting to land near Phoenix. His lung and aorta were punctured. After extensive surgery and rehabilitation, De Groote recuperated and resumed flying and piano playing. His miraculous recovery was covered on CBS News Sunday Morning by Charles Kuralt.

== Death ==
In 1989, he returned to South Africa to visit family and for a concert tour. There, he was hospitalized with tuberculosis and pneumonia. He died in Johannesburg on 22 May 1989. He was 36 years old.

== Recordings ==
- Béla Bartók: String Quartet No. 6; Piano Quintet. Chilingirian Quartet, Steven De Groote (pno). Chandos CHAN 8660
- Erich Wolfgang Korngold: Orchestral Works, Vol. 2: Much Ado About Nothing, Incidental Music and Suite, Sursum Corda, and Concerto for Piano Left Hand and Orchestra. Steven De Groote (pno), Nordwestdeutsche Philharmonie, Werner Andreas Albert (cond). CPO
- Walter Piston: Sonatina; Gunther Schuller: Recitative and Rondo; Aaron Copland: Nocturne. Robert Davidovici (vln), Steven De Groote (pno). New World Records NW 80334
- Sergei Prokofiev: Piano Sonata No. 8; Romeo & Juliet - Suite for Piano. Steven De Groote (pno). Apex 0927 48306 2
- Max Reger: Piano Concerto in F minor, Op. 114. Steven De Groote (pno), SWF-Sinfonieorchester Baden-Baden, Michael Gielen (cond). Intercord Gielen-Edition (INT 860.90)
- In Memory of Steven De Groote (1953–1989): Sergei Prokofiev: Piano Sonata No. 8; Romeo & Juliet - Suite for Piano; Ludwig van Beethoven: Sonata No. 2 in A major, Op. 2 No. 2; Sonata No. 21 in C major, Op. 52 'Waldstein'. Steven De Groote (pno). Finlandia 1576-57703-2
- Van Cliburn International Competition Retrospective Series, Vol. 1: Steven De Groote - In Memoriam (works by Frédéric Chopin, Joseph Haydn, Sergei Prokofiev, and Franz Schubert). Steven De Groote (pno). VAI Audio 1145
- The Fifth Cliburn Competition 1977. Steven De Groote (pno) (Samuel Barber, Béla Bartók, and Frédéric Chopin), Alexander Toradze (pno) (Franz Liszt and Igor Stravinsky), and Jeffrey Swann (pno) (Robert Schumann). VAI Audio 1146
- Goldfingers: Music For 4 Pianos, Eight Hands (Aaron Copland, George Frideric Handel, Witold Lutosławski, Felix Mendelssohn, Moritz Moszkowski, Franz Schubert, Maurice Ravel, and others). Steven De Groote, José Feghali, Vladimir Viardo, and Ralph Votapek (pnos). VAI Audio 1227
