= Thomas Rosenkranz =

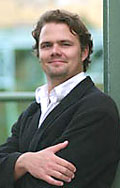
- Mr. Rosenkranz

Background information
- Origin: [USA]
- Genres: Contemporary music, International Music
- Occupations: Musician, Professor of Piano
- Instrument: Piano
- Years active: 1990s – Present
- Website: www.thomasrosenkranz.net

Thomas Rosenkranz is a celebrated American pianist and is the first Director of Music at the Yehudi Menuhin School in Qingdao, China.

== Studies ==
Rosenkranz studied under Robert Shannon at the Oberlin Conservatory (B.M.) where he was awarded the William Abate Prize in Piano upon graduation and at the Eastman School of Music (M.M. and D.M.A.), where he studied with and served as a teaching assistant to Nelita True. He continued his studies in Paris with Yvonne Loriod-Messiaen through the generous support of the Presser Foundation for Music.

== Awards and concert appearances ==
Rosenkranz was the National Winner of the MTNA Collegiate Piano Competition in 1999 and was awarded the Classical Fellowship from the American Piano Awards in 2003. His recital activities have taken him throughout the world with performances at the Lincoln Center (New York), Kennedy Center (D.C.), 92nd Street Y (New York), Hilbert Circle Theatre (Indianapolis), Poly Theatre (Beijing), National Concert Hall (Shanghai), L'Acropolium (Carthage), Théâtre de la Ville (Tunis), Shanghai Contemporary Festival (Shanghai), International House of Tokyo (Tokyo), and Poly Theatre (Beijing). He has appeared as soloist with the Indianapolis Symphony Orchestra, the National Orchestra of Beirut, Northwest Chamber Orchestra and was the featured soloist for the Oberlin Orchestra's 2006 Tour of China. He has also worked directly with many notable contemporary composers including George Crumb, Frederic Rzewski, John Adams (composer), and Steve Reich.

== Artistic Ambassador ==
Artistic diplomacy has also been a significant aspect of Rosenkranz's career. He served as a Cultural Ambassador for the United States Department of State from 2003-2004, fostering mutual understanding through music during tours in Tunisia and Lebanon, where he presented concerts, lectures, and public masterclasses. In 2022, he was named a Senior Fulbright Scholar to Taiwan, serving as an artist-in-residence at Tunghai University in Taichung, where he conducted concerts, masterclasses, and lectures throughout the region.

== Educator ==
Rosenkranz is a sought after artist teacher, having conducted residencies and masterclasses at prestigious institutions, including the conservatories of Shanghai, Shenyang, Xinghai, Tianjin, and Xi’an in China, as well as Taipei Normal University, Seoul National University, and Yong Siew Toh Conservatory of Music in Singapore. In the United States, he has taught at The University of Hawaii at Manoa, Bowling Green State University and the UMKC Conservatory. In 2019, he was named as an Honorary Visiting Professor at the Sichuan Conservatory in China, where he offers annual masterclasses and lectures. He served as jury member for the 2024 Yunnan International Piano Arts Festival and Competition in China. He is currently the Director of Music at the Yehudi Menuhin School in Qingdao, China.

== Recordings ==
- Steve Reich - Triple Quartet (Nonesuch, 2001), with the ensemble Alarm Will Sound.
- Steve Reich - Tehillim / The Desert Music (Cantaloupe Music, 2002), with the ensemble Alarm Will Sound.
- Mark Applebaum - Catfish (Tzadik, 2003), premiere recording of "Omnibus Etude" for solo piano.
- Le Minaret et la Tour (Cristal Records France, 2005), works of Riadh Fehri.
- The Oberlin Orchestra in China (Oberlin Records, 2007), soloist for Rhapsody in Blue by George Gershwin.
- Brian Hulse - Pseudosynthesis (Albany Records, 2009), premiere recording of "For Rumi" with flutist Lisa Cella.
