= Sean Chen (pianist) =

Pianist

- Born: August 27, 1988 (age 37); Margate, Florida, U.S.
- Occupations: Pianist; composer; arranger; professor
- Musical career
- Genres: classical
- Years active: 2013-present
- Labels: harmonia mundi; Steinway; Navona
- Website: seanchenpiano.com

Sean Chen (born August 27, 1988) is an American pianist.

== Education ==
Chen grew up in Oak Park, California, and received private piano instruction from Edward Francis. Chen was accepted into the Juilliard School, and received both his Bachelor and Master of Music degrees there, studying with Jerome Lowenthal and Matti Raekallio. Chen then went on to Yale School of Music and received an Artist Diploma, studying under Hung-Kuan Chen.

== Awards ==
In 2013, Chen won both the American Piano Awards and third prize at the 14th Van Cliburn International Piano Competition. Subsequently, he was awarded the Leonore Annenberg Fellowship in 2015.

Chen awards prior to his 2013 successes include the Juilliard Concerto Competition in 2008, Best Performance of an American Work at the Cleveland International Piano Competition in 2009, and the Juilliard Gina Bachauer Competition in 2010, and 2nd prize at the 2011 Seoul International Music Competition.

While a graduate student at Juilliard, Chen also received the prestigious Paul & Daisy Soros Fellowship for New Americans in 2010.

== Career ==
Throughout his performances, Chen has played with orchestras such as the Fort Worth, Indianapolis, Kansas City, San Diego, Knoxville, Hartford, Louisiana Philharmonic, Milwaukee, North Carolina, Pasadena, Phoenix, Santa Fe, and New West Symphony Orchestras, as well as the Chamber Orchestras of Philadelphia, Indianapolis, and South Bay, collaborating with such esteemed conductors as Leonard Slatkin, Michael Stern, Gerard Schwarz, Nicholas McGegan, Miguel Harth-Bedoya, Marcelo Lehninger, and James Judd.

Chen also transcribes, composes, and improvises. His concert arrangements for piano include Overture to the Marriage of Figaro, the slow movement from Rachmaninoff Symphony No. 2, Ravel's La Valse, Overture to Candide, and the Finale to Beethoven Symphony No. 9. His most recent original composition is Daydream No. 1 - Steps, commissioned as a gift for the retirement of American Pianists Association's President/CEO.

Chen currently serves as Artist-in-Residence at the University of Missouri–Kansas City Conservatory and is managed by Jonathan Wentworth Associates, Ltd.

== Discography ==
- Ravel: Le tombeau de Couperin, Sonatine (2021, Steinway & Sons)
- KaleidosCoping (with Celeste Johnson, oboe and Michael Gordon, flute) (2019, Equilibrium)
- La Valse (2014, Steinway & Sons)
- For the Young Artist: Works of Michael Glenn Williams (2014, Navona)
- Sean Chen: Crystal Award - Fourteenth Van Cliburn International Piano Competition (2013, harmonia mundi)
