= Lora Dimitrova =

Bulgarian classical pianist, teacher and leader in music education (born 1962)

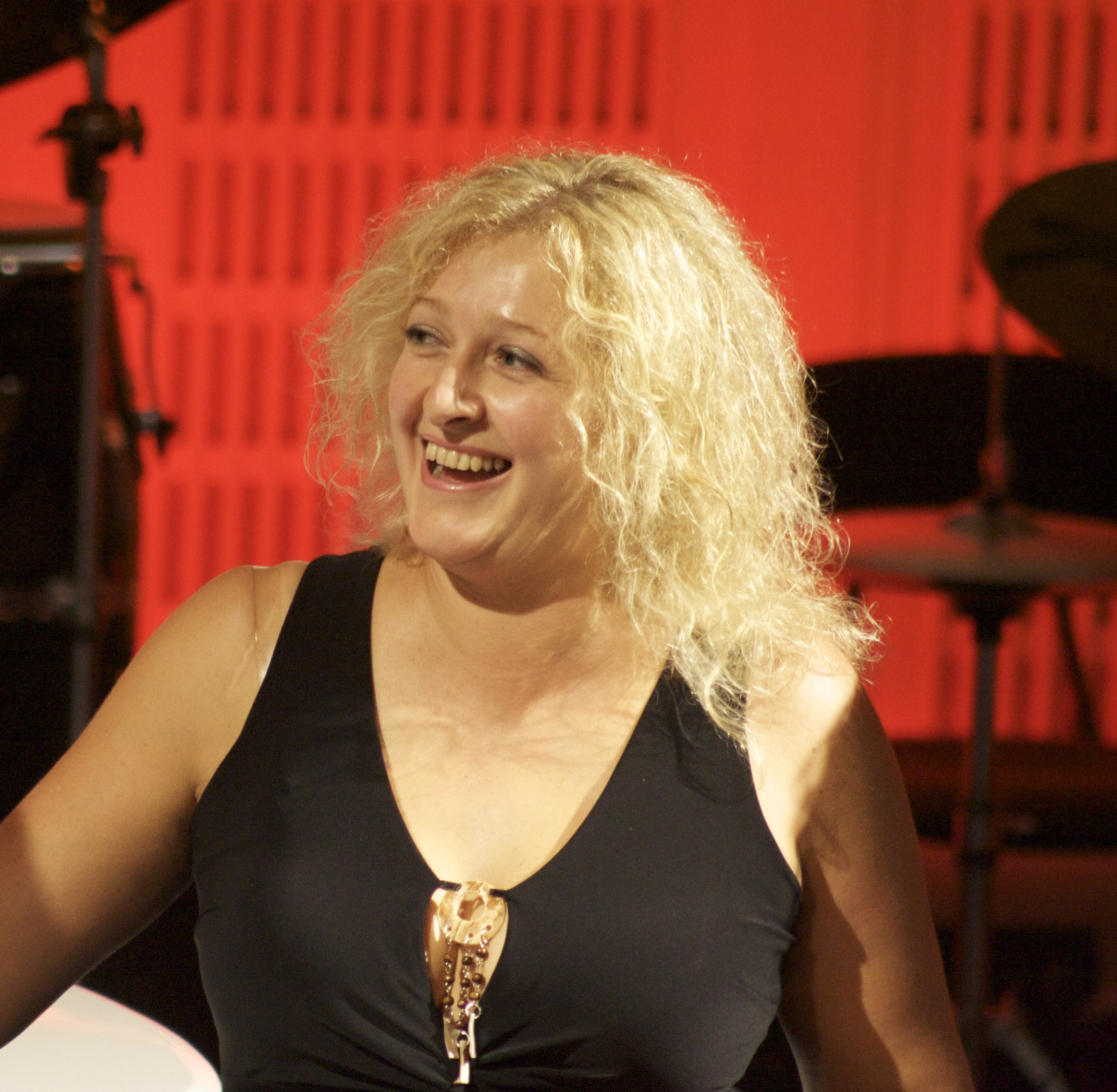
- Lora Dimitrova in 2008

Background information
- Born: 9 September 1962 (age 64); Sofia, Bulgaria
- Genre: Classical music
- Occupation: Pianist
- Instrument: Piano
- Years active: 1977–present
- Website: www.loradimitrovapiano.com

Lora Dimitrova (Bulgarian: Лора Димитрова, born 9 September 1962) is a Bulgarian classical pianist, teacher and leader in music education. She lives in the United Kingdom.

== Early life in Bulgaria ==
Dimitrova was born on 9 September 1962 in Sofia, Bulgaria. She received her early musical training at the "Lyubomir Pipkov" National Music School in Sofia in the piano class of Milena Kurteva. From 1981 to 1987 she attended the "Pancho Vladigerov" National Academy of Music (Bulgaria) in Sofia where she studied with Julia and Konstantin Ganevi, pupils of the celebrated pedagogue, Heinrich Neuhaus. She was thus immersed in this Russian School of piano playing for the 20 formative years of her piano education.

Dimitrova graduated with honours from the four-year performance diploma course in 1985 and was one of the two students selected to take the two-year advanced masterclass diploma (premier prix) which she gained in 1987. Lora was also appointed part-time assistant to the Ganevi's piano class in the academy in 1985, teaching both undergraduate and post-graduate students while studying for her advanced diploma – a position she held until she left the country.

Notable debut performances during this time include

- 1979: debut with the National Academy of Music Orchestra conducted by Emil Yanev in Bulgaria State Hall, Sofia, playing Beethoven's Fourth Piano Concerto
- 1982: debut recital at the Bulgarian Contemporary Music Festival in Sofia
- 1984: debut with the Leipzig Gewandhaus Orchestra conducted by Kurt Masur in Leipzig, Germany, playing Mozart's D minor piano concerto
- 1986: debut recital in the Grand Hall of Moscow Conservatory

At this time, Bulgaria was part of the Eastern Bloc under Soviet control and apart from travel to compete (Senigallia, Italy; Leeds International Piano Competition, UK; Van Cliburn International Piano Competition, USA; International Music Competition "Maria Callas" Piano, Greece), Dimitrova was unable to perform in the West or have access to Western recordings.

However, following success at the Maria Callas competition and subsequent auditions, she received an offer with scholarships to study at the Guildhall School of Music and Drama in London (UK). After many challenges, she finally obtained the precious Bulgarian visa at the end of 1988 to study in the West.

== Solo performing career in the West ==
Dimitrova studied in the advanced piano class at Guildhall School of Music and Drama in London in 1989/1990 and was awarded the Sheriffs' prize for Performance and the Premier Prix diploma. While studying there she entered the YCAT (then Young Concert Artists Trust, now Young Classical Artists Trust) competition for management and promotion and was chosen as one of their artists in 1989 and thus began a busy performing schedule in the UK and Europe.

In 1993, Dimitrova had a chance encounter with the conductor Sir Georg Solti. She had received a phone call asking if she could accompany a singer who was auditioning for Solti but whose pianist had failed to show up. "It was complete sight-reading" said Dimitrova. "I was given the music – songs by Vaughan Williams – 15 minutes before going into Sir Georg's studio. I had never met the singer, let alone played with him." Solti said "the singer wasn't anything very much, so I began listening to how well the pianist was playing." The result was a joint recital at Wigmore Hall in London for Dimitrova and French pianist Patricia Pagny which Solti personally sponsored, promoted and presented. Dimitrova went on to perform Bartok's third piano concerto with Solti and the London Symphony Orchestra to critical acclaim in festivals in Dresden and Salzburg. Solti also nominated Dimitrova for the Chimay International Competition for Pianists and Violinists in 1995 (European Chimay Foundation) which she won, leading to further recitals in Europe.

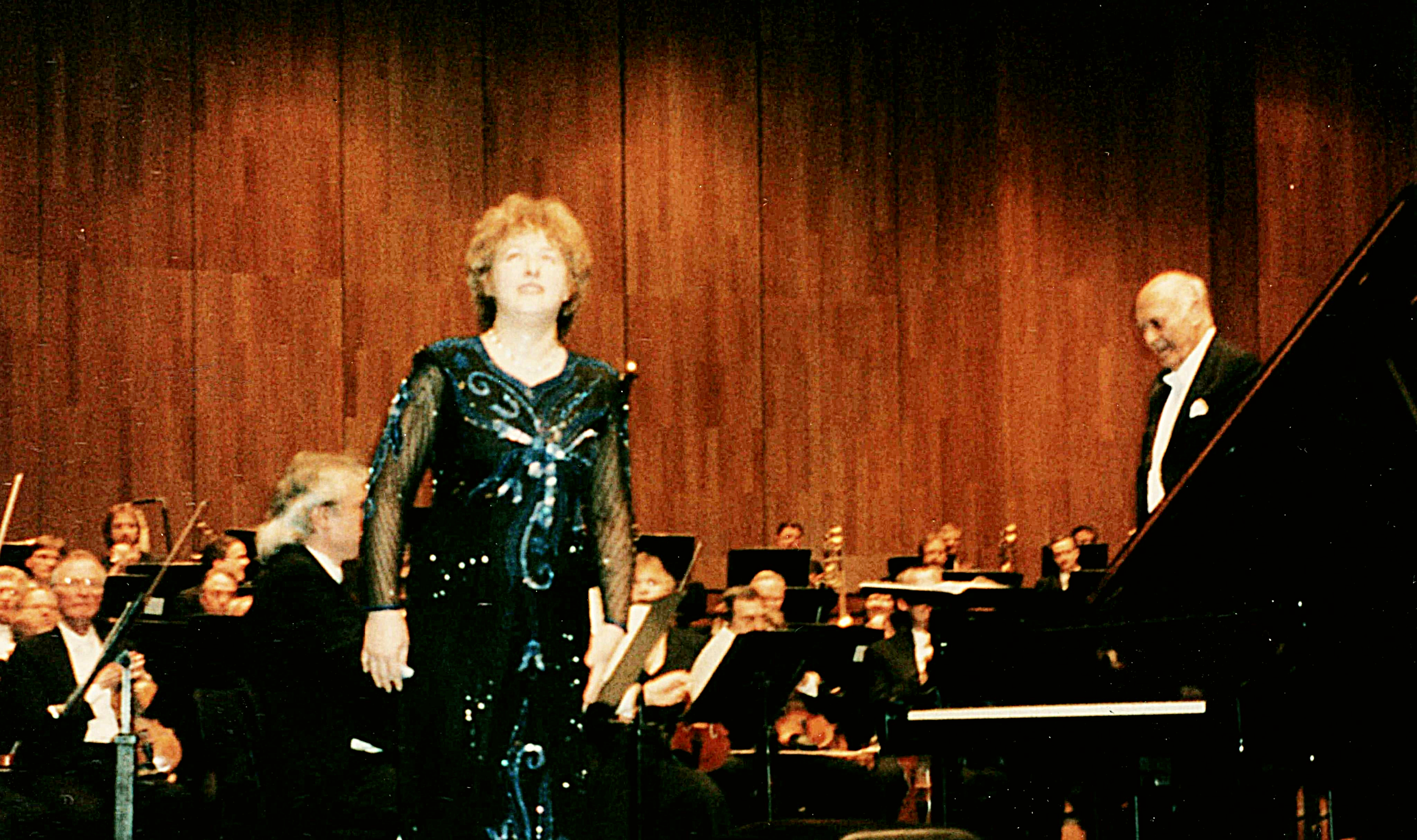
Dimitrova in the 1996 Salzburg Spring Festival with Sir Georg Solti and the LSO

Dimitrova is a Steinway Artist. Notable debut concerts in her career include:

- 1989: Barbican Centre main hall (London) debut with the Royal Philharmonic Orchestra conducted by Per Dreier (Rachmaninov's 2nd Piano Concerto)
- 1990: Purcell Room (London) debut solo recital
- 1991: Fairfield Halls (London) debut solo recital
- 1991: Malvern Festival debut with the English String Orchestra conducted by William Boughton (Shostakovich 2nd Piano Concerto)
- 1993: Royal Festival Hall (London) debut with the London Concert Orchestra conducted by Fraser Goulding (Grieg Piano Concerto)
- 1995: Wigmore Hall joint recital with Patricia Pagny, arranged and presented by Sir Georg Solti
- 1995: Palace of Fine Arts, Brussels debut with the Belgian National Orchestra conducted by Dmitry Yablonsky (Rachmaninov's 2nd Piano Concerto)
- 1996: Monaco debut – recital in the Spring Arts Festival
- 1996: Dresden Music Festival and Salzburg Whitsun Festival debuts with the London Symphony Orchestra conducted by Sir Georg Solti (Bartok 3rd Piano Concerto)

== Chamber music ==
In 1995, Dimitrova won the Parkhouse Award for Chamber Music, playing with the violinist Hanna Weinmeister. This award provided concert management for the duo by GBZ Management and resulted in many chamber recitals in London and around the UK. The duo also played in Germany, Switzerland and Austria.

Dimitrova has performed in chamber music concerts with numerous violinists and ensembles, including:

- Hanna Weinmeister (violin)
- Priya Mitchell (violin)
- Sian Phillips (musician) (violin)
- Ben Hancox (violin)
- Chloe Hanslip (violin)
- Navarra String Quartet
- Kandinski Trio
- Maggini String Quartet
- Leon Bosch (double bass)

== Contemporary music ==
Dimitrova has championed contemporary music throughout her career and given several world premiers of important works for solo piano by Bulgarian, English and Belgium composers.

In Bulgaria, Dimitrova performed regularly at the Bulgarian Contemporary Music Festival in Sofia, often premiering work by her contemporaries and she continued to champion Bulgarian music in the UK, for example performing works by Emil Mirchev and Pancho Vladigerov at the Brighton Festival in 1990.

Following her first prize in the Chimay International Competition for Pianists and Violinists in 1995 (European Chimay Foundation, ECF), Dimitrova teamed up with the Belgian composer Frederic Van Rossum performing a number of his works in concerts including at the 1996 Festival of Flanders and giving the world premiere of "Al di la dello scuro" (beyond the dark) on 28 September 1996 in Liege, Belgium.

Dimitrova has often performed the work of English composer Francis Routh and he wrote his 8 movement piano piece, Scenes for Piano IV "Bretagne" (Op.68) for her. She recorded this work for the Redcliffe Recordings label as well as Routh's Angels of Albion (Op 64) and performed it on a tour of England with Routh in 1999.

== Arranging and Quattro Piano Plus ==
In the early 2000s Lora created a unique group of musicians known as "Quattro Piano Plus", consisting of 4 pianists (performing at 4 separate pianos) plus a percussionist. They perform arrangements of popular music from the classical repertoire as well as from films and musicals, often combining multiple genres, rhythms and melodies into a single piece: Dimitrova leads the group and writes the majority of the arrangements.

The Quattro Piano+ group puts on popular shows with video and lighting effects and the group has toured extensively in Europe, most recently in autumn 2023 in Bulgaria with backing provided by the Vidin Philharmonic Orchestra. The group has released 2 CDs (on the "Hey-U Records" and "Newplay Classical Recordings" labels).

== Teaching and leadership positions ==
In addition to performing, Dimitrova has taught, delivered master classes and lectures and adjudicated for music competitions. Towards the end of the 1990s, with her playing career being hampered by injury, Dimitrova spent increasingly more of her time on these activities. She has taught and given masterclasses at Guildhall School of Music and Drama, Chetham's School of Music, the Yehudi Menuhin School, Purcell School, Wells Cathedral School, Blackheath Conservatoire and KIPC (Kent International Piano Courses). She has also lectured at Queen's University Belfast and Andover College (Hampshire) and given master classes in France, Germany, Spain and Switzerland.

Dimitrova created the curriculum for a Performance and Interpretation course for BMus and MMus students in Canterbury Christ Church University and delivered the course from 1998 to 2008.

She also set up her own small private piano school called the Sospiro Piano Centre in Biggin Hill, Kent, UK, with 6 staff and 100 students which ran from 2000 to 2013.

In 2009, Dimitrova was appointed head of keyboard for Bromley Youth Music Trust (BYMT), an independent music service providing musical education to young people in the London Borough of Bromley and surrounding areas. At that time, the keyboard department at BYMT was tiny and almost inactive but she developed the role to be full time and built the department into a large, thriving one.

She recruited, managed, motivated and inspired skilled staff (building up to 60 teachers and 30 accompanists), reached out to more than 100 schools and engaged more than 1,700 piano students. Dimitrova continued as Head of Keyboard at BYMT until 2023. During her time there she created many regular termly courses, classes and concerts, including ones for students and adults as well as children. She created BYMT's first piano library and piano alumni database. She also created the annual Summer International Piano School for all ages and organised numerous events, such as recordings and trips to museums, concerts and masterclasses.

During Dimitrova's expansion and invigoration of the Keyboard Department at BYMT, she was asked to create, promote and head up a Jazz department. She recruited a team of specialist jazz musicians and set up BYMT's first jazz school, led by Buster Birch. As well as organising jazz events at the music centre at BYMT, she reached out to Pizza Express Head Office and organised jazz events in their Bromley and Beckenham branches, featuring BYMT students and professional musicians.

Dimitrova also helped organise jazz performance opportunities at local events and worked closely with Buster Birch and Trinity College of Music's Jazz Department to raise awareness of Jazz education and help develop the BYMT Jazz School. Dimitrova was presented with the Will Michael Foundation Jazz Education Award in both 2015 and 2017 – this was awarded to Bromley in recognition of an outstanding commitment to jazz education. She continued as head of Jazz until 2022.

== Awards ==
Event	Location	Award	Year
Svetoslav Obretenov Piano Competition	Provadia, Bulgaria	Special Jury Prize	1977
Young Piano Virtuosi Competition	Ústí nad Labem, Czech Republic	Third Prize	1977
International Piano Competition	Senigallia, Italy	Finalist	1980
J.S Bach International Piano Competition	Leipzig, Germany	Finalist – 7th place	1984
Maria Callas International Piano Competition	Athens, Greece	Second Prize (ex aequo)	1988
Craxton Memorial Trust	Guildhall School of Music & Drama, London, UK	Education Scholarship	1989
Arthur Boyd Scholarship	Guildhall School of Music & Drama, London, UK	Education Scholarship	1989
British Gas Scholarship	Guildhall School of Music & Drama, London, UK	Education Scholarship	1989
Young Concert/Classical Artists Trust (YCAT)	London, UK	Artist Management	1989
Guildhall School of Music & Drama Awards	London, UK	Sheriffs' Prize for Performance	1990
Concerto Competition	Hastings, UK	First Prize	1990
Brighton Philharmonic Piano Competition	Brighton, UK	Third Prize	1991
Parkhouse Award for Chamber Music	London, UK	Artist Management (GBZ Management) for duo with violinist Hanna Weinmeister	1995
European Chimay Foundation International Music Competition	Chimay, Belgium	First Prize	1995
Will Michael Foundation	London, UK	Award for promoting Jazz Education as Head of Jazz at Bromley Youth Music Trust	2015 & 2017
