= Nikolai Arnoldovich Petrov =

Russian pianist (1943–2011)

Nikolai Petrov Николай Петров

Background information
- Born: 14 April 1943; Moscow
- Origin: Russia
- Died: 3 August 2011 (aged 68) Moscow
- Genres: Classical
- Occupation: Pianist
- Instrument: Piano
- Years active: 1968—2011

Nikolai Arnoldovich Petrov (Russian: Николай Арнольдович Петров, 14 April 1943 – 3 August 2011) was a Russian pianist.

Petrov was born in Moscow, the son of the cellist Arnold Ferkelman and the grandson of the operatic bass Vasily Rodionovich Petrov, and began learning the piano at the age of three. At the Central Music School of the Moscow Conservatory his teacher was Tatyana Kestner and in 1961 Petrov entered the class of Yakov Zak at the Conservatory itself. He subsequently won second prize at the Van Cliburn International Piano Competition in Fort Worth, Texas and won second prize at the Queen Elisabeth International Music Competition in Brussels.

Petrov gave regular performances in the Great Hall of the Moscow Conservatory as well as touring widely and appearing at major world venues such as Carnegie Hall, the Concertgebouw, the Royal Festival Hall (London) and the Teatro Colón. Petrov's large repertoire included more than fifty concertos and he worked with many prominent conductors, including Mariss Jansons, Kirill Kondrashin, Gennady Rozhdestvensky, Yevgeny Svetlanov and Yuri Temirkanov.

His awards included the Grande Médaille d'Or of the Académie Balzac, People's Artist of the USSR and the Russian State Prize. In 1998, he founded the Nikolai Petrov International Philanthropic Foundation.

He served on the jury at the 2007 International Tchaikovsky Piano Competition.

Petrov was married to Larissa, who outlived him. He had a daughter named Evgenia who was born in 1976. He died in August 3, 2011, aged 68.

In a telegram to his family, Russian president Dmitry Medvedev stated:

An outstanding musician, teacher and public figure has left us. Mr Petrov performed at the world’s great concert halls and won the public’s hearts with the depth and expressiveness of his playing. He lovingly preserved the traditions of Russia’s performance school and nurtured young talent on its professional road. His colleagues appreciated his great enthusiasm and creative energy.

Nikolai Petrov gave us an example of worthy service to the arts and was open and always well disposed towards all around him. He has left us, but his rich legacy and the good memory of this exceptional man remain with us.

== Honours and awards ==
- Order of Merit for the Fatherland, 3rd class (2004) and 4th class (1998)
- Order of Honour (2008)
- Honored Artist of the RSFSR (1975)
- People's Artist of RSFSR (1986)
- People's Artist of the USSR (1991)
- State Prize of the Russian Federation (1993)
- One of the minor planets is named after Nikolai Petrov
- President of the Academy of Russian Art (from 1998)
- The badge of honour "Public recognition" (1998)
