= Ilze Graubiņa =

Latvian pianist (1941–2001)

- Born: 8 November 1941; Riga, Reichskommissariat Ostland (present-day Latvia)
- Died: 24 January 2001 (aged 59) Riga, Latvia
- Genres: Classical
- Occupation: Pianist
- Instrument: Piano

Ilze Graubiņa (Note: Latvian: Ilze Graubiņa; Russian: Илзе Граубиня, romanized: Ilze Graubinya) (8 November 1941 – 24 January 2001) was a Latvian pianist. She was born in Riga and trained at the Moscow Conservatory under Abram Shatskes and Jakov Flier, to whom she subsequently served as an assistant.

Graubiņa won the 1964 Johann Sebastian Bach Competition, and three years later she was appointed a teacher at the Jāzeps Vītols State Conservatory, where she has taught since; Armands Ābols, Andris Grigalis, Sandra Jalanecka, Karina Jermaka, Inese Klotina, Olga Pryadko and Victor Santapau and Manuel Angel Ramirez from Spain, have been trained under her. Her recording debut was a Johann Sebastian Bach monophonic LP for Melodiya.

Competition record
1962	(United States) Van Cliburn IPC	Diploma
1964	(East Germany) J. S. Bach IPC	1st Prize
