= José Carlos Cocarelli =

Brazilian pianist

- Born: 17 March 1959 (age 67); Rio de Janeiro, Brazil
- Occupation: Classical pianist
- Awards: Ferruccio Busoni International Piano Competition; Concours Long-Thibaud

José Carlos Cocarelli (born 17 March 1959) is a Brazilian classical pianist resident in France. Born in Rio de Janeiro, he was a pupil of Adele Marcus and Merces de Silva Telles. He was awarded second prize on the 1984 Paloma O'Shea Santander International Piano Competition and on the 1989 Van Cliburn International Piano Competition. He won the Ferruccio Busoni International Piano Competition in 1985 and the Concours Long-Thibaud in 1986.

== Life and career ==
Cocarelli was born in Rio de Janeiro to José Carlos and Judith (née Montanhas da Cruz) Cocarelli. His father was an oboist with the orchestra of the Teatro Municipal and a music professor at the Instituto Villa-Lobos. His mother was a pianist, composer, and music professor at the Federal University of Rio de Janeiro. He showed musical talent from a very early age and began learning the piano at age six, taught by his mother. When he was nine he won a place in the Youth Orchestra of the Teatro Municipal. The following year he won a place as a soloist with the Brazilian Symphony Orchestra and in 1971 at age 12 was awarded first prize in the Lorenzo Fernández piano competition. As a child and young teenager he appeared frequently as a soloist in recitals and on Brazilian television, including a solo recital at age 14 in the Sala Cecília Meireles performing pieces by Mozart, Beethoven, Mendelssohn, Chopin, and Villa-Lobos. He went on to receive a scholarship from the Brazilian government when he was 18 which allowed him to study in New York City as a private pupil of Adele Marcus. He later studied in Paris with Merces de Silva Telles, a Brazilian pupil of Claudio Arrau.

In 1980 at the Panorama da Música Brasileira Atual, Cocarelli premiered Ronaldo Miranda's atonal solo piano work Prólogo, Discurso e Reflexão which had been written expressly for him. He also played the piece at the 1981 Maria Canals International Music Competition where he won third prize. The critic Xavier Montsalvatge noted that it was a risky choice for a music competition but that Cocarelli had demonstrated a "profound understanding of contemporary music". When asked in 1997 how a musician from Brazil can make himself known in Europe, Cocarelli replied: "The only solution is the one that I adopted: to become known by winning major international competitions. It's a business card, which bring recordings and good reviews in magazines." Between 1981 and 1989 he had embarked on a series of major piano competitions winning first prizes in the Ferruccio Busoni International Piano Competition (1985) and the Concours Long-Thibaud (ex-aequo with Yukino Fujiwara, 1986) as well as 2nd prizes in the Paloma O'Shea Santander International Piano Competition (1984) and the Van Cliburn International Piano Competition (1989).

The Van Cliburn competition led to several recital engagements in major US concert halls, including his Carnegie Hall debut in 1991, where he played Alban Berg's Piano Sonata and Brahms' Variations on a Theme by Robert Schumann (Op. 9). A review of the recital in the New York Times noted: "Along with generally excellent control and fastidiously even passage work came thoughtful rubatos and occasionally an almost brooding intensity." An international career ensued, although it remained a low-key one, with Cocarelli playing with chamber ensembles and orchestras rather than as a solo recitalist. He has lived in Europe since the early 1990s, eventually settling in France. Now retired from the concert stage, he teaches piano at the community music school in Fresnay-sur-Sarthe.

== Recordings ==
- 8th Van Cliburn International Piano Competition, 1989: The winners (Teldec)
- Four great 20th century piano sonatas (Musical Heritage Society)
- José Carlos Cocarelli spielt Beethoven und Schubert (Deutsche Welle)
