= Fei-Ping Hsu =

Pianist

Fei-Ping Hsu (Chinese: 许斐平; July 20, 1952–November 27, 2001) was a Chinese-American pianist.

Hsu was born on the island of Gulangyu in southeast China. As the youngest son of a Christian pastor, he grew up singing hymns while his mother played on an upright piano. By the time he was twelve, he played the complete Chopin Etudes and had performed with the Shanghai Philharmonic. Hsu was invited to perform for Queen Elisabeth of Belgium, and she invited him to study and perform in Europe under her sponsorship. He was not allowed to accept because of the advent of the Cultural Revolution during the 1960s. He survived the labor camps and became known in China and toured throughout the Far East as a soloist with the Central Philharmonic.

He was a Gold Medal winner at the Arthur Rubinstein International Piano Competition. He also garnered top prizes in other competitions. Hsu made his New York recital debut at Alice Tully Hall in 1983 and performed throughout the United States, including appearances at Carnegie Hall, Lincoln Center, and the Kennedy Center in Washington, D.C. He also frequently toured Europe, South America, and the Far East.

In 1979, Hsu attended the Juilliard School of Music under the tutelage of Sascha Gorodnitzki. He has appeared as a soloist with major orchestras, including the Montreal Symphony Orchestra, the Moscow Philharmonic, and the Finnish Tempere Symphony Orchestraope. Hsu also played with the China National Symphony Orchestra in Beijing, the Shanghai Symphony Orchestra, the Shanghai Radio Symphony Orchestra and the Kyushu Symphony Orchestra in Japan. Since the early 1970s, Hsu had recorded for labels such as the Columbia Records, the RCA Victor Records, the Hugo Records, the ROI Productions, and the MA Recordings in Japan.

He died in a car accident on a highway from Harbin to Qiqihar while on a concert tour in China on November 27, 2001, aged 51. He is survived by his wife and daughter.
