= Christopher Taylor (pianist) =

American pianist

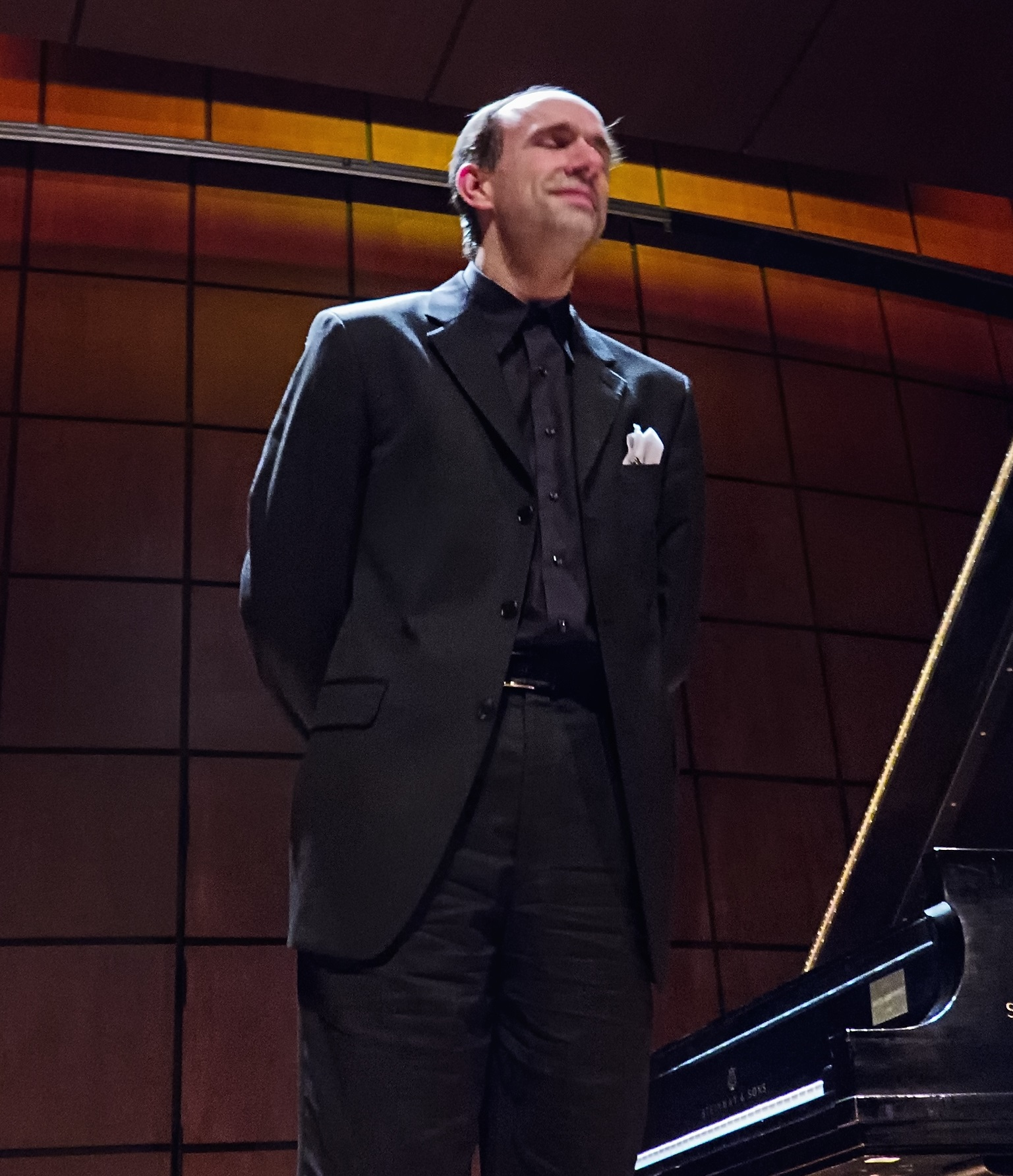
- Taylor in 2012
- Born: 1970 (age 55–56)
- Education: Harvard College
- Occupations: Concert pianist; music educator
- Employer: University of Wisconsin–Madison (2000–present)

Christopher Taylor (born 1970) is an American pianist.

Taylor graduated from Harvard College and has performed with the National Symphony Orchestra, the Fort Worth Symphony Orchestra, the Atlanta Symphony Orchestra, the New York Philharmonic, the Los Angeles Philharmonic, and the Buffalo Philharmonic Orchestra, among others. He has received an Avery Fisher Career Grant, the Classical Fellowship of the American Piano Awards, and the Gilmore Young Artist Award, and earned a bronze medal at the Van Cliburn International Piano Competition in 1993.

Taylor lives in Middleton, Wisconsin, with his wife and two daughters, and has been a professor of piano at the University of Wisconsin–Madison since 2000.
