= Philippe Bianconi =

French pianist

Philippe Bianconi (born 27 March 1960) is a French pianist.

== Early life and education ==
Born in Nice, France, Bianconi studied at the Conservatoire de Nice with Simone Delbert-Février and later in Paris with Gaby Casadesus and in Freiburg Vitalij Margulis. At the age of 17, he won first prize at the Jeunesses musicales competition in Belgrade; he went on to win first prize at the Cleveland International Piano Competition and the silver medal in the 1985 Van Cliburn Competition.

== Career ==
Since his debut at Carnegie Hall in 1987 he has performed in major concert halls and festivals around the world. Apart from solo recitals and chamber music, he has performed with many leading orchestras and conductors. He has been appointed as the director of the Conservatoire Américain de Fontainebleau in September 2014.

== Discography ==
- Maurice Ravel. L'Œuvre pour piano. 2 CD, La Dolce Volta (2023)
- Claude Debussy. 12 Études – Le martyre de saint Sébastien. 1 CD, La Dolce Volta (2020)
- Robert Schumann. Papillons, Carnaval & Davidsündlertänze. 1 CD, La Dolce Volta (2016)
- Frédéric Chopin. 4 Ballades. 1 CD, La Dolce Volta (2014)
- Claude Debussy. Préludes. 2 CD, La Dolce volta (2012)
- Claude Debussy. Estampes, Images, Masques, L'Isle Joyeuse, ... D'Un Cahier D'Esquisses. SACD (2011)
- Robert Schumann. The Lyrinx Recordings. 2 CD (2011, re-publication of the 1996 and 1998 recordings)
- Ernest Chausson. Concert op.21 u.a. Werke. Mit R. Pasquier (Violine), S. Piau (Sopran) and the Parisii Quartet. Saphir (2010)
- Maurice Ravel. L'œuvre pour piano seul. 2 SACD. Lyrinx (2007)
- Johannes Brahms. The Violin Sonatas. With Tedi Papavrami (Violin). æon (2007)
- Franz Schubert. Sonata D. 959, 3 Klavierstücke D. 946. Lyrinx (2001)
- Robert Schumann. Fantasie in C, Davidsbündlertänze. Lyrinx (1998)
- Robert Schumann. Etudes symphoniques, Variations posthumes, Humoreske. Lyrinx (1996)
- Maurice Ravel. Miroirs, Valses Nobles et sentimentales, Gaspard de la Nuit. Lyrinx (1993)
- Gabriel Fauré. La Bonne Chanson. With the Parisii Quartet, J. Correas (Bariton), D. Desjardins (dble. bass). Pierre Verany label (2005)
- Johannes Brahms. Piano Quintet op.34. With the Sine Nomine Quartet. Claves
- Schostakovitch. Sonata op.40 in d, Prokofiev, Sonata op.119 in C. With Gary Hoffman (Cello). Le Chant du Monde (1999)
- Camille Saint-Saëns. Piano Concerto n.2 in g. With the Budapest Philharmonic Orchestra/Rico Saccani (2003)
- Franz Schubert. Winterreise D.911. With Hermann Prey (baritone). Denon (1984)
- Franz Schubert. Die schöne Müllerin. With Hermann Prey (baritone). Denon (1985)
- Franz Schubert. Schwanengesang. With Hermann Prey (baritone). Denon (1985)
- The Seventh Cliburn Competition, 1985. Prokofiev, Ravel, Liszt. VAIA (1998)
