= Van Cliburn International Piano Competition =

Quadrennial classical music competition in Fort Worth, Texas

The Cliburn
- Founded: 1962; 64 years ago
- Type: Non-governmental organization
- Purpose: Piano competition
- Website: www.cliburn.org

The Van Cliburn International Piano Competition (The Cliburn) is an American piano competition by The Cliburn, first held in 1962 in Fort Worth, Texas, and hosted by the Van Cliburn Foundation. Initially held at Texas Christian University, the competition has been held at the Bass Performance Hall since 2001. The competition is named in honour of Van Cliburn, who won the first International Tchaikovsky Competition, in 1958.

The Van Cliburn Competition is held once every four years, with its most recent edition held in 2025. The winners and runners-up receive substantial cash prizes, plus concert tours at world-famous venues where they are able to perform pieces of their choice. While Cliburn was alive, he did not serve as a judge in the competition, provide financial support, or work in its operations. However, he attended performances by competitors regularly and greeted them afterwards on occasion.

Contestants draw lots for their performing place in the competition. The competition began on-line audio streaming of the performances in 1997. In 2009, the competition webcast all of the performances live for the first time in its history.

== Medalists ==
Year	Gold	Silver	Bronze
1962	Ralph Votapek; United States	Nikolai Petrov; Soviet Union	Mikhail Voskresensky; Soviet Union
1966	Radu Lupu; Romania	Barry Lee Snyder; United States	Blanca Uribe; Colombia
1969	Cristina Ortiz; Brazil	Minoru Nojima; Japan	Mark Westcott; United States
1973	Vladimir Viardo; Soviet Union	Christian Zacharias; West Germany	Michael James Houstoun; New Zealand
1977	Steven De Groote; South Africa	Alexander Toradze; Soviet Union	Jeffrey Swann; United States
1981	Andre-Michel Schub; France	Panayis Lyras; United States; Santiago Rodriguez; United States	Not Awarded
1985	José Feghali; Brazil	Philippe Bianconi; France	Barry Douglas; United Kingdom
1989	Alexei Sultanov; Soviet Union	José Carlos Cocarelli; Brazil	Benedetto Lupo; Italy
1993	Simone Pedroni; Italy	Valery Kuleshov; Russia	Christopher Taylor; United States
1997	Jon Nakamatsu; United States	Yakov Kasman; Russia	Aviram Reichert; Israel
2001	Stanislav Ioudenitch; Uzbekistan; Olga Kern; Russia	Maxim Philippov; Russia; Antonio Pompa-Baldi; Italy	Not Awarded
2005	Alexander Kobrin; Russia	Joyce Yang; South Korea	Sa Chen; China
2009	Nobuyuki Tsujii; Japan; Haochen Zhang; China	Yeol Eum Son; South Korea	Not Awarded
2013	Vadym Kholodenko; Ukraine	Beatrice Rana; Italy	Sean Chen; United States
2017	Yekwon Sunwoo; South Korea	Kenneth Broberg; United States	Daniel Hsu; United States
2022	Yunchan Lim; South Korea	Anna Geniushene; Russia	Dmytro Choni; Ukraine
2025	Aristo Sham; Hong Kong	Vitaly Starikov; Israel / Russia	Evren Ozel; United States

== Amateur and Junior competitions ==
In 1999, the competition added an amateur edition, which allows high-performing pianists aged 35 or above to participate, provided that they do not earn their main source of income through piano pedagogy or performance. Amateur competitions have been held in 2000, 2002, 2004, 2007, 2011, 2016, and 2022. Originally, the 2016 Amateur Competition was to be held in 2015, but was canceled, due to the inauguration of a junior version of the Cliburn Competition, which attracts top-performing teenage piano students from around the globe. Similarly, the originally scheduled 2020 competition was postponed until 2022 due to the COVID pandemic. Like the regular Cliburn Competition, the amateur and junior competitions consist of solo rounds, followed by concerto performances with the Fort Worth Symphony Orchestra in the finals.

== See also ==
- Van Cliburn Foundation
- List of classical music competitions
- World Federation of International Music Competitions
