= José Feghali =

Brazilian musician (1961–2014)

José Feghali (March 28, 1961 – December 9, 2014) was a Brazilian pianist, who, until his death, was an Artist-in-Residence at Texas Christian University's school of music in piano. He was the gold medalist winner of the Van Cliburn International Piano Competition in 1985.

The Van Cliburn Foundation and the Texas Christian University announced Feghali's death on December 9, 2014, by apparent suicide.

== Education ==
José Feghali made his recital debut at the age of five and his concerto debut three years later with the Brazilian Symphony Orchestra. Feghali studied in London with Maria Curcio, then continued his studies at the Royal Academy of Music with Christopher Elton.

== Professional career ==
Gold Medalist and winner of the Chamber Music prize at the Seventh Van Cliburn International Piano Competition, José Feghali was an Artist-in-Residence at TCU's School of Music in Fort Worth since 1990. He had appeared in over 1000 performances worldwide, including appearances with such orchestras as the Berlin Philharmonic, Concertgebouw of Amsterdam, Rotterdam Philharmonic, Gewandhaus of Leipzig, Royal Philharmonic, BBC Philharmonic, London Symphony, Birmingham Symphony, National Symphony of Spain, Warsaw Philharmonic, and the Shanghai and Beijing symphonies. In the US, he appeared in all the major cities and in virtually every state of the nation, including performances with the orchestras of Chicago, St. Louis, Dallas, Houston, Detroit, Atlanta, Baltimore, Pittsburgh and the National Symphony, and had worked with many eminent conductors including Kurt Masur, Christoph Eschenbach, Yuri Temirkanov and Leonard Slatkin. Recital appearances include performances at Carnegie Hall, Chicago Orchestra Hall, Kennedy Center, Ambassador Auditorium, Queen Elizabeth Hall, Wigmore Hall, Bass Hall and the Meyerson Symphony Center. Solo and concerto performances have taken him to Canada, Mexico, United Kingdom, France, Holland, Spain, Portugal, Austria, Germany, Italy, Switzerland, Poland, Bulgaria, Turkey, China, Singapore, Hong Kong and several countries in Latin America.

An avid chamber musician, José had appeared in several chamber festivals in the US and abroad, as well as in collaboration with James Galway, Truls Mørk, Antonio Meneses, Alisa Weilerstein, Edgar Meyer, David Shifrin, Olivier Charlier, Régis Pasquier, Tokyo String Quartet and John Vickers. He had been a judge at several international piano competitions, given regular masterclasses and was a member of the faculty at both the Piano Texas Piano Academy and Festival and the Mimir Chamber Music Festival in Fort Worth. His recordings are available on the Naxos, Koss and VAI labels.

José had worked as a producer, recording and mastering engineer in over 50 commercial and non-commercial audio recording projects, and was planning on releasing a number of CDs, including solo and chamber recitals. José was Coordinator of Internet Technologies for TCU's School of Music and was awarded the Mike Ferrari Award for his work at the School with Internet2 and conferencing related technology. He was invited to give a presentation at Internet2's 2009 Performing Arts Production Workshop on the application of Microsoft Research's ConferenceXP software in music and arts education after he discovered and corrected a flaw in the software that had until then made it incapable of high fidelity sound operation. ConferenceXP is an open-source software platform created by Microsoft Research used to deliver broadcast-quality audio and video for real-time distributed collaboration and distance learning environments. Unlike most video conferencing applications, sound quality is much more important than video quality for remote music pedagogical applications. José's changes to the ConferenceXP code has enabled the software to be one of the only software/hardware solutions available today with the capability of streaming compressed video simultaneously with CD-quality uncompressed audio, thus considerably reducing the bandwidth requirements for a successful distance learning music experience.

== Death ==
Feghali's body was discovered on December 9, 2014, at his home in Fort Worth, Texas, an apparent suicide by gunshot.

== See also ==
- Thirteenth Van Cliburn International Piano Competition
