= Simone Pedroni =

Italian pianist and conductor

Simone Pedroni is an Italian pianist and conductor born in Novara, Italy.

Pedroni graduated from Milan's Giuseppe Verdi Conservatory in 1990. In 1995, he received his master's degree at Accademia Pianistica "Incontri col Maestro" in Imola, Italy, where he studied with Lazar Berman, Franco Scala and Piero Rattalino.

Pedroni was the gold medalist of the Ninth Van Cliburn International Piano Competition in 1993.
