= Cécile Ousset =

French pianist

Cécile Ousset (born 23 January 1936) is a French pianist.

Cécile Ousset was born in Tarbes, France, and gave her first recital at the age of five, subsequently studying at the Paris Conservatoire at the age of 10 with Marcel Ciampi (who had formerly taught Yaltah and Hephzibah Menuhin) where, aged only fourteen, she was awarded first prize in the piano graduation class of 1950. In 1953, she won the Claire Pages prize and went on to win several competition credits, including the Marguerite Long-Jacques Thibaud Competition in Geneva at the age of 17; the Prix du Concours International de Geneve at 18; the Premier Grand Prix du Concours International Viotti at 19; the Premier Prix du Concours International Busoni at 23 and a Van Cliburn Prize when 26. She gained the fourth prize in the Queen Elisabeth Music Competition in Belgium in 1956 (other contestants included Vladimir Ashkenazy, who won first prize, John Browning, Lazar Berman, Tamás Vásáry and Peter Frankl), the Busoni and the Van Cliburn.

She has performed throughout the world and recorded a repertoire including concertos of Brahms, Grieg, Saint-Saëns, Liszt, Mendelssohn, Schumann, Tchaikovsky, Prokofiev, Rachmaninov, Ravel, and Poulenc under the direction of Kurt Masur, Simon Rattle, Neville Marriner, etc. She won the Grand Prix du Disque of the Académie Charles Cros for her recording of the Brahms Piano Concerto No. 2 with Kurt Masur.

To fulfill her interest in teaching and coaching young talent, Ousset has taught Master Classes in the United States, Canada, Europe, Australia, and the Far East. This includes her annual Master class sessions, held since 1984 in the medieval village of Puycelsi in south-west France. She is a frequent adjudicator for major competitions such as Van Cliburn, Rubinstein, Leeds, and the Queen Elisabeth Music Competition. She is noted for her recordings of Ravel, Chopin, Liszt, Rachmaninoff, and Debussy.

Ousset is Honorary Patron of the Yaltah Menuhin Memorial Fund.

In December 2006, she retired from public performance due to health problems related to her back.
