= Minoru Nojima =

Japanese classical pianist (1945–2022)

- Born: May 23, 1945; Yokosuka, Kanagawa, Japan
- Died: May 9, 2022 (aged 76); Tokyo, Japan
- Other name: 野島 稔
- Occupation: pianist

Minoru Nojima (野島 稔, Nojima Minoru; May 23, 1945 – May 9, 2022) was a Japanese classical pianist. At the time of his death he was President of the Tokyo College of Music.

== Biography ==
Minoru Nojima was a child prodigy in Japan, won a major nationwide competition there as a teenager, studied with Lev Oborin in Moscow and then with Constance Keene and Abram Chasins in New York City, and burst upon the international music scene as a second prize winner of the Van Cliburn piano competition in 1969. Although known and highly respected amongst pianists as a "pianist's pianist," he was not well known to most music lovers, largely because he did not like to make recordings and made very few.

In 2007, it was reported that Nojima's 1988 Reference Recordings recording "Nojima Plays Liszt" was one of the recordings plagiarized by Joyce Hatto. 2014 - Received Japan Art Academy Award.
