= Alexander Korsantia =

Georgian pianist

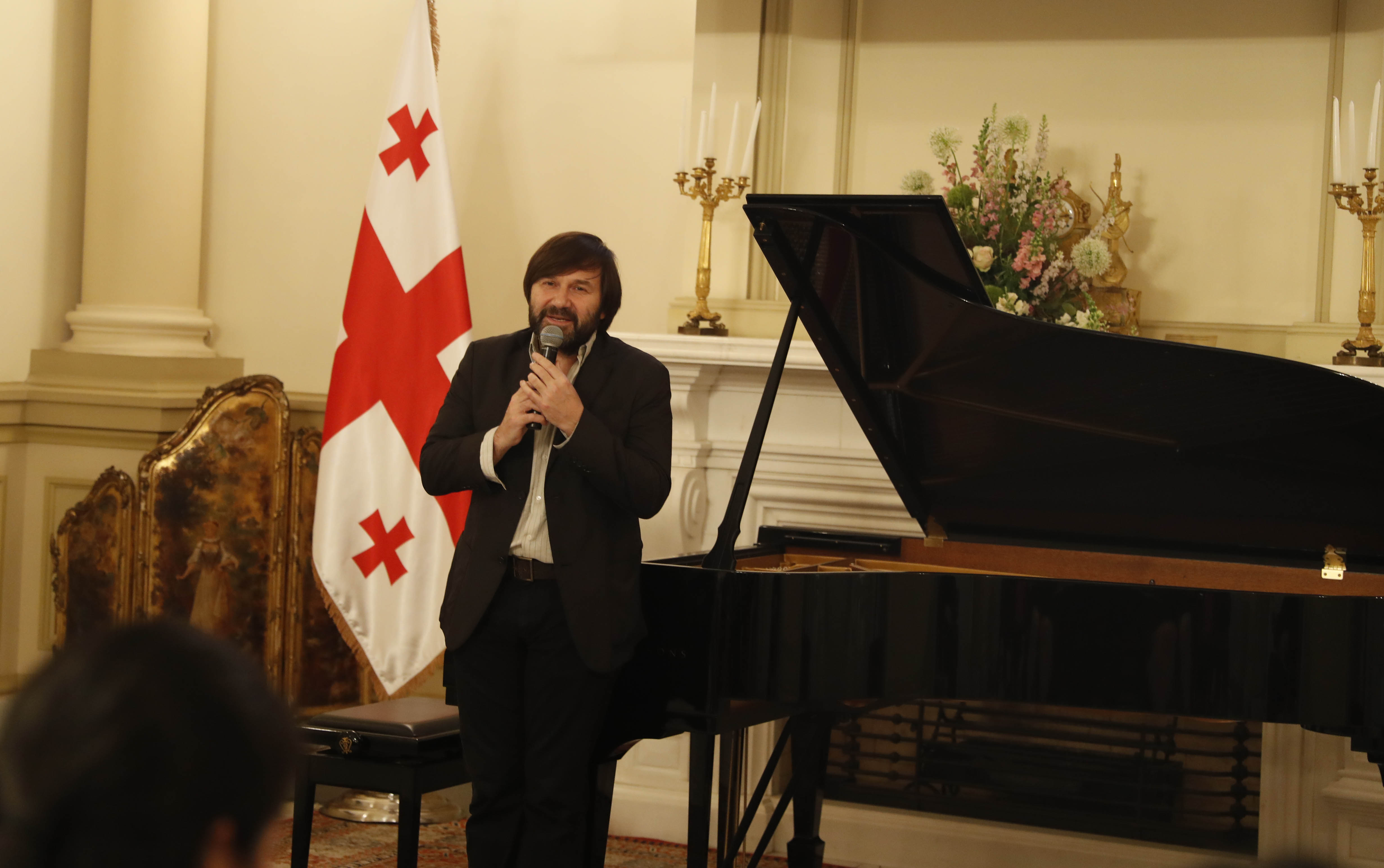
Alexander Korsantia, Tbilisi, 2022

Alexander Korsantia (Georgian: ალექსანდრე კორსანტია; born 1965, Tbilisi) is a Georgian pianist.

Alexander immigrated to Canada in 1992, settling in Vancouver, British Columbia. After living in Vancouver for a number of years, he moved to Boston, Massachusetts.

He won the 1988 Sydney International Piano Competition (as a Soviet citizen) and the 1995 Arthur Rubinstein Competition in Tel Aviv. He is a member of the piano faculty at Boston's New England Conservatory.

In 1999 Korsantia was decorated with the National Honor Medal from the Georgian Government.
