= Andrew Wilde (pianist) =

English classical pianist

Andrew Wilde (born 1965) is a British classical pianist.

Wilde studied at Chetham's School of Music and the Royal Northern College of Music in Manchester, the city where he is still based. His music teachers included Ryszard Bakst.

Wilde has played often as a recitalist, and has a particular affinity for the music of Chopin. He also appears as an accompanist (in 2006 he marked the Mozart anniversary by a series of concerts of the violin sonatas with the Hungarian violinist Vilmos Szabadi) and he has a concerto repertoire. Wilde has performed with the following English orchestras: Bournemouth Symphony Orchestra, Halle Orchestra, London Mozart Players, London Philharmonic Orchestra, Royal Liverpool Philharmonic, Royal Philharmonic Orchestra. In the Americas he has performed with the National Symphony Orchestra (Washington) and Dallas Symphony Orchestra.
