= Thomas Duis =

German pianist (born 1958)

Thomas Duis (born 1958, in Frankfurt) is a German pianist.

Duis studied with Kurt Gerecke in Wiesbaden, Karl-Heinz Kämmerling in Hannover and Fanny Waterman in Leeds.

He was the top-ranking pianist at the 1986 Artur Rubinstein Competition in Tel Aviv (he was awarded the 2nd prize, the 1st being declared void), and was awarded 2nd prize at the 1986 Gina Bachauer International Piano Competition and 3rd prizes at the 1985 Sydney Competition and the 1987 ARD Competition in Munich. Duis had his discographical debut for EMI, and has performed internationally since.

He was the rector of the Hochschule des Saarlandes für Musik und Theater until 2012, and is a musical ambassador for the Goethe-Institut.

== Premieres ==
- Benjamin Yusupov: Concerto-Intimo for piano and orchestra. Jerusalem Symphony Orchestra - Leon Botstein, conductor. Henry Crown Hall, Jerusalem; March 28, 2007.
