= Ralph Votapek =

American pianist

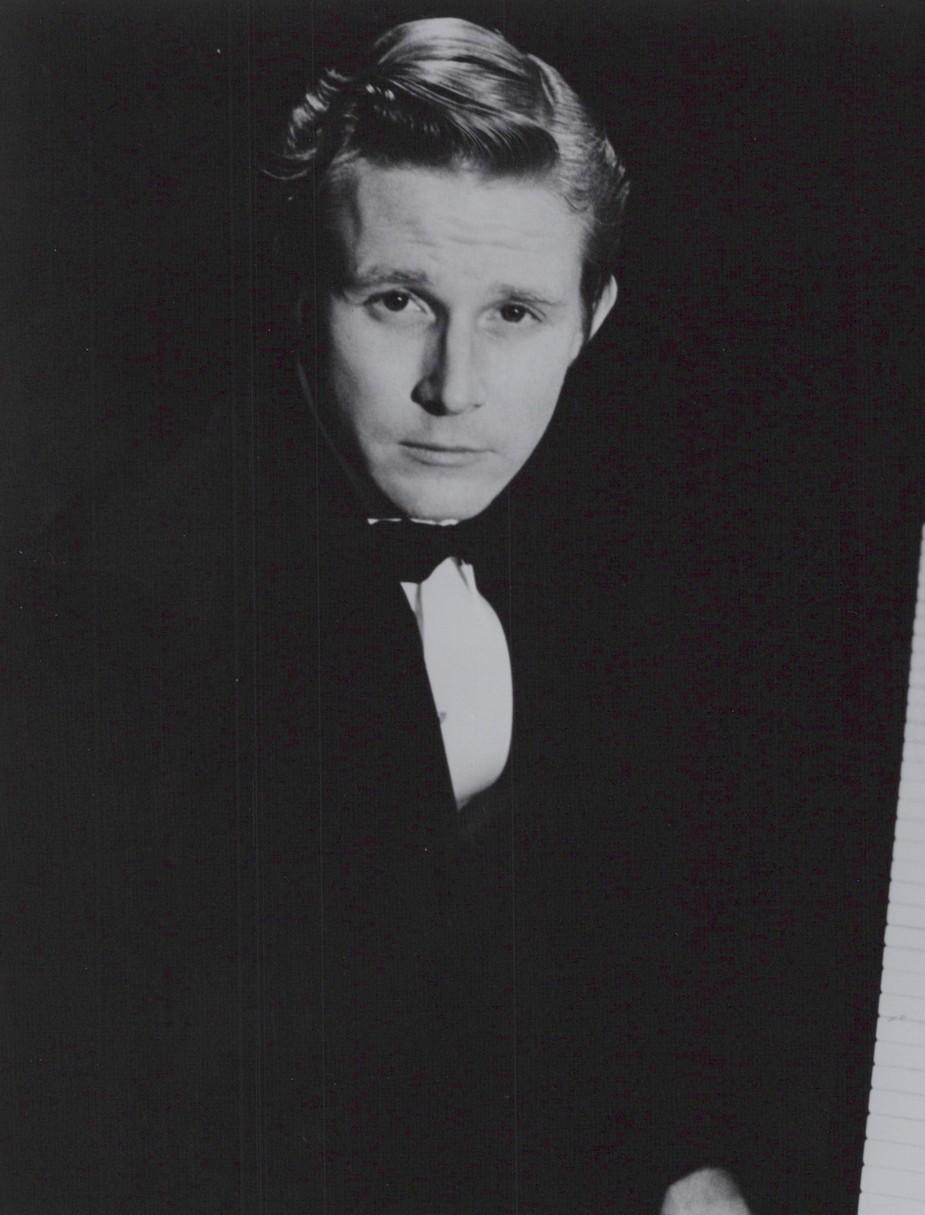
- Votapek in 1970

Background information
- Born: Ralph James Votapek; March 20, 1939 (age 87); Milwaukee, Wisconsin, U.S.
- Education: Northwestern University; Juilliard School
- Genres: Classical music
- Occupation: Pianist

Ralph James Votapek (born March 20, 1939) is an American pianist. He won the First Van Cliburn International Piano Competition in 1962, along with the inaugural competition's First Place prize of US $10,000. He was the Jury Chairman of the eighth Van Cliburn competition in 2022.

== Biography ==
Votapek was born in Milwaukee, Wisconsin in 1939. At the age of nine, he began studying music at the Wisconsin Conservatory in Milwaukee. He later studied at Northwestern University under Gui Mombaerts and at the Juilliard School in New York. Votapek was awarded the Naumburg Award in 1959, and performed his debut recital at New York's Town Hall. After winning the First Van Cliburn International Piano Competition in 1962, Votapek signed contracts with RCA and Sol Hurok, and made his debut at Carnegie Hall.

Votapek was a professor of piano and Artist in Residence at the Michigan State University College of Music, and served there for 36 years before retiring in 2004.
