= Eleventh Van Cliburn International Piano Competition =

2001 piano competition in Fort Worth, Texas

The Eleventh Van Cliburn International Piano Competition took place in Fort Worth, Texas from May 25 to June 10, 2001.

Olga Kern and Stanislav Ioudenitch won the competition ex-aequo, while Maxim Philippov and Antonio Pompa-Baldi shared the silver medal. It was the first time that two pianists earned the top prize.

The Eleventh Van Cliburn International Piano Competition was the first time in the history of the competition that the Van Cliburn Foundation commissioned more than one original composition. At the suggestion of composer John Corigliano, a 25-member nominating committee of distinguished musicians issued invitations to 42 noted American composers to submit solo piano scores 8 to 12 minutes in length. Thirty-one scores were submitted. Original works by four American composers were chosen: C. Curtis-Smith, Lowell Liebermann, James Mobberley, and Judith Lang Zaimont.

== Jurors ==
- (United States) John Giordano (chairman)
- (Italy) Marcello Abbado
- (Spain) Joaquín Achúcarro
- (United States) Eileen Tate Cline
- (United States) Richard Dyer
- (United States) Claude Frank
- (United States) Thomas Frost
- (Poland) Andrzej Jasinski
- (Israel) Yoheved Kaplinsky
- (Germany) Jürgen Meyer-Hosten
- (France) Jean-Marc Peysson
- (United States) Menahem Pressler
- (China) Guangren Zhou

== Results ==
Contestant	R1	SF	F
(Italy) Alessandra Maria Ammara			
(Italy) Maurizio Baglini			
(Israel) Dror Biran			
(Belarus) Yuri Blinov			
(Italy) Stefania Cafaro			
(China) Yunjie Chen			
(China) Ying Feng			
(Italy) Davide Franceschetti			
(Japan) Tadashi Imai			
(Uzbekistan) Stanislav Ioudenitch			Gold medal
(Finland) Paavali Jumppanen			
(Israel) Amir Katz			
(Russia) Olga Kern			Gold medal
(Ukraine) Alexey Koltakov			
(Russia) Sergei Kudriakov			
(Taiwan) Chih-Han Liu			
(Israel) Albert Mamriev			
(Russia) Maxim Maniukov			
(Russia) Oxana Mikhailov			
(Russia) Anton Mordasov			
(Russia) Alexandre Moutouzkine			
(Japan) Masaru Okada			
(South Korea) Jong-hwa Park			
(South Korea) Jong-gyung Park			
(Russia) Maxim Philippov			Silver medal
(Italy) Antonio Pompa-Baldi			Silver medal
(Russia) Vassily Primakov			
(United States) Andrew Russo			
(Belgium) Edna Stern			
(China) Xiaohan Wang			
(United States) Roger Wright			
