= Eglė =

- Gender: Female
- Name day: 4 April

Origin
- Region of origin: Lithuania

Eglė is a Lithuanian feminine given name. Individuals bearing the name Eglė include:

- Eglė Balčiūnaitė (born 1988), Lithuanian middle-distance runner
- Eglė Janulevičiūtė (born 19??), Lithuanian classical pianist
- Eglė Jurgaitytė (born 1998), Lithuanian pop singer
- Eglė Karpavičiūtė (born 1984), Lithuanian painter
- Eglė Rakauskaitė (born 1967), Lithuanian visual artist
- Eglė Staišiūnaitė (born 1988), Lithuanian hurdler
- Eglė Zablockytė (born 1989), Lithuanian cyclist

== Mythology ==
- Eglė the Queen of Serpents
