= Vera Gornostayeva =

Russian pianist and pedagogue

Vera Gornostayeva (October 1, 1929 – January 19, 2015) was a Russian pianist and pedagogue.

An Emeritus Artist of the Russian Federation at the time of her death, Gornostayeva was a graduate of the Moscow Tchaikovsky Conservatory, where her teacher was Heinrich Neuhaus.

== Career ==
In addition to her performing career, Gornostaeva was a professor at the Moscow Tchaikovsky Conservatory. She gave masterclasses in Italy, Germany, France, Switzerland, the United Kingdom, Japan and the United States. Her book Two Hours After the Concert was translated and published there. Other educational activities included leading annual seminars for Russian music teachers, giving lectures on radio and TV on classical music and the performing arts, and publishing articles and books. She was a jury member and often chairman of the jury at many prestigious international music competitions, and was also the President of the Moscow Association of Musicians.

Gornostayeva was renowned for having trained about 50 prize winners of international piano competitions, including Alexander Slobodyanik, Semion Kruchin, Valery Sigalevitch, Petras Geniušas, Dina Joffe, Yuri Lisichenko, Pavel Egorov, Alexander Paley, Eteri Andjaparidze, Ivo Pogorelich, Irene Inzerillo, Aleksandra Romanić, Sergei Babayan, Marian Pivka, Maxim Philippov, Vassily Primakov, Ayako Uehara, Maki Sekiya, Yurie Miura, Lukas Geniušas, Vadym Kholodenko, Stanislav Khristenko, Andrey Gugnin, Margarita Shevchenko. and others.

She made numerous recordings for Melodiya, Philips, Phoenix, Yamaha, LP Classics, and other labels of piano works by Beethoven, Mozart, Brahms, Chopin, Debussy, Liszt, Schumann, Schubert, Scriabin, Tchaikovsky, Rachmaninov, Prokofiev, Shostakovich and Mussorgsky. She died on January 19, 2015.
