= Kotaro Fukuma =

Japanese pianist

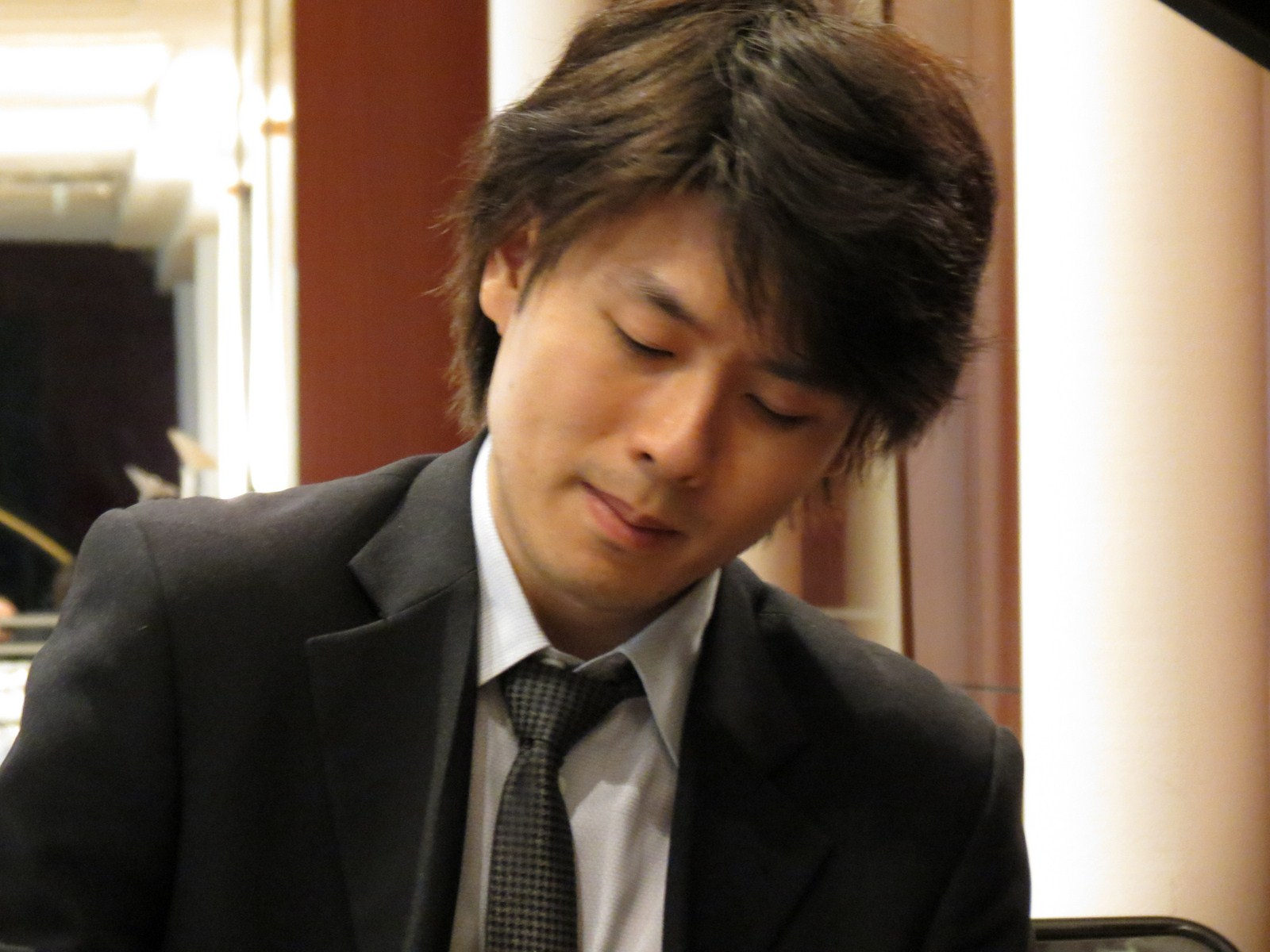
Fukuma rehearsing in 2013

Kōtarō Fukuma (ふくま こうたろう or 福間 洸太朗) is a Japanese classical pianist born 29 August 1982 in Kokubunji City, west of the special wards of Tokyo. He graduated from Tokyo Metropolitan Musashi High School.

== Biography ==
At the Conservatoire de Paris, Fukuma was a pupil of Bruno Rigutto and Marie-Françoise Bucquet. He won his first piano prize in 2005. He was awarded a prize at the age of 14 in a competition for young pianists in Salt Lake City. He then decided to become a professional. Second Prize at the Maj Lind Competition in Helsinki in 2001, he won the 1st Prize and the Chopin Prize at the age of 20 at the Cleveland International Piano Competition in 2003.

Fukuma has worked with personalities such as Jorge Chaminé, Klaus Hellwig, Leon Fleisher, Mitsuko Uchida, Richard Goode, Alicia de Larrocha, Maria João Pires, Leslie Howard, Dominique Merlet, and Aldo Ciccolini. He has played in the Berliner Philharmonie, the Konzerthaus Berlin, Wigmore Hall in London, the Gewandhaus in Leipzig, the Salle Gaveau in Paris, the Auditorium National in Madrid, the Salle Mozart in Zaragoza, the Suntory Hall, the Opera City in Tokyo, the Victoria Hall of Geneva, the Carnegie Hall in New York. In 2013, he won the Chopin Prize in Japan. He replaced Hélène Grimaud in the concert series "Grandes Pianistas" at the Municipal Theatre of Santiago. He also performed at La Folle Journée in Tokyo in 2013, 2015, 2016 and 2018 - in recital or with orchestra.

Fukuma plays with orchestras such as the Cleveland Orchestra, the Israel Philharmonic Orchestra, the Dresden Philharmonic, the Moscow Philharmonic Orchestra, l'Orchestre national d'Île-de-France, l'Orchestre national de Lille, the New Japan Philharmonic under the baton of conductors such as Rafael Frühbeck de Burgos, François-Xavier Roth, Asher Fisch, Yuki Kakiuchi, Kazuki Yamada, Mihhail Gerts, and others.

In solo piano, chamber music and concertos, Fukuma has acquired a substantial and varied repertoire of no less than forty concertos. He has played rare concertos such as those of Englund (1955), MacDowell, James MacMillan and Hermann Goetz. He also plays the concerto for two pianos by Tōru Takemitsu. In July 2016 he played Brahms' Concerto No. 2 "at the last minute" replacing Nelson Freire, with the Orchestre National du Capitole de Toulouse under the direction of Tugan Sokhiev at La Halle aux Grains in Toulouse. Passionate about contemporary music, he has created national and world premieres of works by Tōru Takemitsu, Matsuo Shishido, Farhad Poupel, Renaud Gagneux, Thierry Escaich, Thierry Huillet, Einojuhani Rautavaara, Seongju Oh, Francesco Milita, Pascal Zavaro. For the Naxos label he has recorded the complete music for piano by Takemitsu.

Fukuma is the youngest pianist to have recorded at the age of 25 in 2007 the complete Albéniz' Iberia published in Japan by Harmony Japan in 2008 and published for the world outside Japan by Éditions Hortus in 2012. His recordings have been praised in most trade magazines (such as Gramophone in Great Britain) or in the daily press, particularly in France in the evening newspaper Le Monde which, in its edition dated Tuesday 30 September 2014, attributed to Kotaro Fukuma "magician fingers" about the Dumka record, and in books about piano. Fukuma also likes to perform with other artists in shows that combine figure skating (Ice Legends, Fantasy on Ice, in 2014, 2015, 2016, with Stéphane Lambiel) or theatre (Le Rappel des Oiseaux - after Gogol's Diary of a Madman, with Paris Opera star dancer Mathieu Ganio, directed by Orianne Moretti - Paris 2016 and 2018). French critics see him as"... a major figure of the young contemporary piano".
