= Tenth Van Cliburn International Piano Competition =

The Tenth Van Cliburn International Piano Competition took place in Fort Worth, Texas from May 23 to June 8, 1997. Jon Nakamatsu won the competition, while Yakov Kasman and Aviram Reichert were awarded the Silver and bronze medals.

William Bolcom composed his Nine Bagatelles for the competition.

== Jurors ==
- (United States) John Giordano (chairman)
- (Romania) Marius Constant
- (United States) Dean Elder
- (United States) Claude Frank
- (England) Ian Hobson
- (United States) Warren Jones
- (United States) Jerome Lowenthal
- (Japan) Hiroko Nakamura
- (Russia) Lev Naumov
- (France) Cécile Ousset
- (United States) Menahem Pressler
- (Italy) Piero Rattalino
- (Slovenia) Dubravka Tomšič
- (Bulgaria) Alexis Weissenberg

== Results ==
Contestant	R1	SF	F
(Japan) Susumu Aoyagi			
(United States) Andrew Armstrong			
(Russia) Yuri Bogdanov			
(Russia) Victor Chestopal			
(Canada) Naida Cole			
(Ukraine) Mikhail Danchenko			
(Brazil) Alexandre Dossin			
(Italy) Filippo Gamba			
(Canada) Joel Hastings			
(Uzbekistan) Stanislav Ioudenitch		w/d	
(Germany) Jan Gottlieb Jiracek			
(Russia) Yakov Kasman			Silver medal
(South Korea) Yong-kyu Lee			
(Federal Republic of Yugoslavia) Aleksandar Madžar			
(United States) Peter Miyamoto			
(Russia) Anton Mordasov			
(United States) Jon Nakamatsu			Gold medal
(Russia) Olga Pushechnikova			
(Israel) Aviram Reichert			Bronze medal
(Italy) Fernando Rossano			
(Sweden) Per Rundberg			
(China) Yuan Sheng			
(Russia) Margarita Shevhchenko			
(United States) Christopher Shih			
(Sweden) Niklas Sivelöv			
(Russia) Katia Skanavi			
(Russia) Alex Slobodyanik			
(United States) Ju-ying Song			
(Russia) Dmitri Teterin			
(Philippines) Albert Tiu			
(Greece) Dimitri Vassilakis			
(Georgia (country)) Georgi Vachnadze			
(Russia) Lev Vinocour			
(Russia) Dmitri Vorobiev			
(China) Yi Wu			
