= Pion (disambiguation) =

A pion is a type of subatomic particle.

Pion may also refer to:

== People ==
- Élisabeth Pion (born 1996), Canadian pianist
- Marc Pion (born 1996), Canadian lacrosse player
- Mariana Pion (born 1992), Uruguayan footballer
- Maurice Pion (1801–1869), French ballet dancer
- Pio Pion (1887–1965), Italian entrepreneur
- Richard Pion (born 1965), American hockey player

== Places ==
- Pión District, in Peru
- Pion, Asturias, in Villaviciosa, Spain

== Other uses ==
- 2S7 Pion, self-propelled gun
- PION Labs, a Brazilian aerospace company
- Posterior ischemic optic neuropathy
- Protein pigeon homolog, a protein
