= Stuani =

Stuani is an Italian surname. Notable people with the surname include:

- Cristhian Stuani (born 1986), Uruguayan footballer
- Giampaolo Stuani (born 1966), Italian pianist
