= Primakov =

Primakov or Primakoff (Russian: Примаков; Ukrainian: Примаков) is a surname, and may refer to:

- Henry Primakoff (1914–1983), American theoretical physicist
- Vitaly Primakov, commander in Soviet Red Army
- Vassily Primakov, Russian concert pianist
- Yevgeny Primakov, Russian politician, former Prime Minister of Russia
- Yevgeny Primakov Jr., Russian politician, member of the State Duma
