= Cleveland International Piano Competition =

Piano competition held in Ohio, US

- Location: Severance Hall, Cleveland, Ohio
- Country: United States
- First award: 1975; 51 years ago
- Website: http://www.clevelandpiano.org

The Cleveland International Piano Competition is an American piano competition that takes place biennially in Cleveland, Ohio. The initial Competition in 1975 and the nine others that followed were sponsored jointly by the Robert Casadesus Society and the Cleveland Institute of Music to honor the memory of French pianist Robert Casadesus. As a result, the Competition was then called the Casadesus International Piano Competition. In 1994, a new organization was formed: the Piano International Association of Northern Ohio (PIANO). Prize winners of the Cleveland International Piano Competition have included renowned artists like Nicholas Angelich, Sergei Babayan, Angela Hewitt, Daejin Kim, Antonio Pompa-Baldi, Jean-Yves Thibaudet, Kotaro Fukuma and among others.

The first Competition with the new name of "Cleveland" took place in August 1995. The 2001 Competition finals were held at Severance Hall with the Cleveland Competition Orchestra conducted by Jahja Ling. The success of this venture led to negotiations in 2003 with the Musical Arts Association resulting in the engagement of the Cleveland Orchestra to play for the four finalists at Severance Hall.

The Cleveland International Piano Competition is a member of the World Federation of International Music Competitions.

== Past prize winners ==
Year	First	Second	Third	Fourth
2024	(China) Zijian Wei	(United States) Evren Ozel	(United States) Maxim Lando	(Italy) Giuseppe Guarrera
2021	(Spain) Martín García García	(Croatia) Lovre Marušić	(South Korea) Byeol Kim	(South Korea) Yedam Kim
2016	(Russia) Nikita Mndoyants	(Italy) Leonardo Colafelice	(Ukraine) Dinara Klinton	(Russia) Georgiy Tchaidze
2013	(Russia) Stanislav Khristenko	(Russia) Arseny Tarasevich-Nikolaev	(France) François Dumont	(China) Jiayan Sun
2011	(Germany) Alexander Schimpf	(Russia) Alexei Chernov	(United States) Eric Zuber	(South Korea) Kyu Yeon Kim
2009	(Croatia) Martina Filjak	(Canada) Dmitri Levkovich	(South Korea) William Youn	(Russia) Evgeny Brakhman
2007	(Russia) Alexander Ghindin	(Israel) Yaron Kohlberg	(Russia) Alexandre Moutouzkine	(Israel) Ran Dank
2005	(China) Chu-Fang Huang	(Russia) Sergey Kuznetsov	(Russia) Stanislav Khristenko	(United States) Spencer Myer
2003	(Japan) Kotaro Fukuma	(South Korea) Soyeon Lee	(Russia) Konstantin Soukhovetski	(Lithuania) Andrius Zlabys
2001	(Italy) Roberto Plano	(South Korea) Minsoo Sohn	(Turkey) Özgür Aydin	(Switzerland) Gilles Vonsattel
1999	(Italy) Antonio Pompa-Baldi	(Russia) Vassily Primakov	(Japan) Shoko Inoue	(United States) Sean Botkin
1997	(Sweden) Per Tengstrand	(Uzbekistan) Gulnora Alimova	(China) Ning An	(Israel) Dror Biran
1995	(Russia) Margarita Shevchenko	(Ukraine) / (United States) Marina Lomazov	(Russia) Dmitri Teterin	(Italy) Giampaolo Stuani
1993	(Israel) Amir Katz	Not awarded	(Japan) Seizo Azuma (Japan) Yuko Nakamichi	(Japan) Katsunori Ishii

Year	First	Second	Third	Fourth	Fifth	Sixth
1991	(Soviet Union) Ilya Itin	(United States) Anders Martinson	(Germany) Markus Pawlik	(France) Jean-François Bouvery	(United States) Timothy Bozarth	(Taiwan) Hsin-Bei Lee
1989	(Soviet Union) Sergei Babayan	(United States) Nicholas Angelich	(Japan) Megumi Kaneko	(France) Pascal Godart	(France) François Chaplin	(Soviet Union) Eglé Januleviciuté
1987	(France) Thierry Huillet	(Israel) Asaf Zohar	(United States) Jonathan Bass	(Taiwan) Beatrice Hsin-Chen Long	(Japan) Takayuki Ito	(Japan) Hiroko Atsumi
1985	(South Korea) Daejin Kim	(Italy) Benedetto Lupo	(France) Hélène Jeanney	(United States) Neil Rutman	(France) Yves Henry	(China) Dan-Wen Wei
1983	(South Korea) Youngshin An	(Japan) Mayumi Kameda	(Canada) Stéphane Lemelin	(United States) Roy Kogan	(United States) Dimitry Cogan	(West Germany) Silke-Thora Matthies
1981	(France) Philippe Bianconi	(United States) Dan Riddle	(France) Rémy Loumbrozo	(United States) Roy Kogan	(United States) Timothy Smith	(United States) Michael Boriskin
1979	(United States) Edward Newman	(France) Jean-Yves Thibaudet	(Canada) Angela Hewitt	(United States) Frederick Blum	(United States) Peter Vinograde	(United States) Douglas Weeks
1977	(France) Nathalie Béra-Tagrine	(United States) Barry Salwen	(United States) Douglas Montgomery	(United States) Laura Silverman	(France) Géry Moutier	(United States) Sandra Shuler
1975	(United States) John Owings	(United States) Julian Martin	(France) John-Patrick Millow	(United States) Roe Van Boskirk	(Japan) Katsurako Mikami	(Poland) Paweł Chęciński

== See also ==
- List of classical music competitions
