= Clapping =

Sound made by striking together two flat body parts

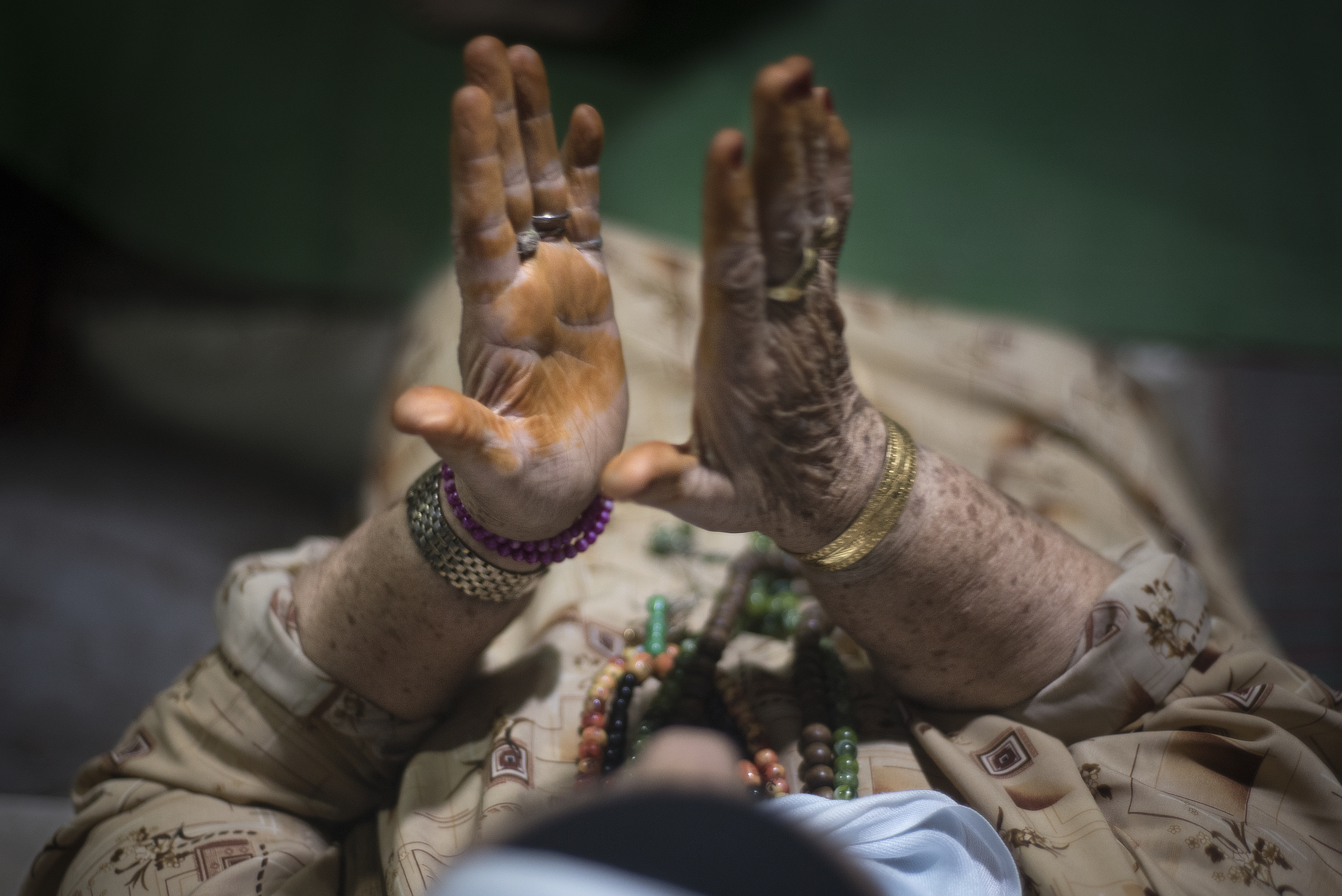
Clapping hands

Clapping is the percussive sound made by striking together two flat surfaces, as in the body parts of humans or animals. Humans clap with the palms of their hands, often quickly and repeatedly to express appreciation or approval (see applause), but also in rhythm as a form of body percussion to match the sounds in music, dance, chants, hand games, and clapping games.

Some people slap the back of one hand into the palm of the other hand to signify urgency or enthusiasm. This act may be considered uncouth by others.

Clapping is used in many forms of music. In American music, clapping is popular in funk, gospel, doo-wop and early pop. In flamenco and sevillanas, two Spanish musical genres, clapping is called palmas and often sets the rhythm and is an integral part of the songs. A sampled or synthesized clap is also a staple of electronic and pop music.

== Musical works that include clapping ==
Classical works performed entirely by clapping

- Steve Reich, Clapping Music (1972)
- Robert Paterson, Voices (1988)
- Pascal Zavaro, Kino-Klap (2008)

Classical works which include clapping

- Carlos Surinach, Ritmo Jondo (1953)
- David Chesky, Flute Concerto et Violin Concerto

The clapping patterns known as keplok are important in Javanese gamelan. A type of synthesized clap is popular in many rap and hip-hop songs as well. This is derived from and mimics the technique used in older popular music (e.g. disco and funk of the 1970s), in which multiple instances of real handclaps were recorded or a single recording was made of a group of performers clapping in unison. This was usually done for the purpose of reinforcing the snare drum beat on the 2nd and 4th beats of the bar (offbeat). Modern R&B, hip hop, and rap often omit the snare drum, making the claps a more obvious and central feature of the beat.

== Acoustics and medical applications ==
In a medical setting, clapping can be used to open up blocked blood circulation. Clapping can be used in acoustics to check the reverberation time of a room. This is determined by measuring the clap's decay time.

== Pedagogical applications ==
Clapping is often used to help people recognize the rhythm in sounds. It can be used to help musicians count out rhythms.

It is also used to teach phonological awareness to students who learn the ways words are constructed. They often clap out syllables to learn to break words into their component sounds.

== Sports and other pursuits ==
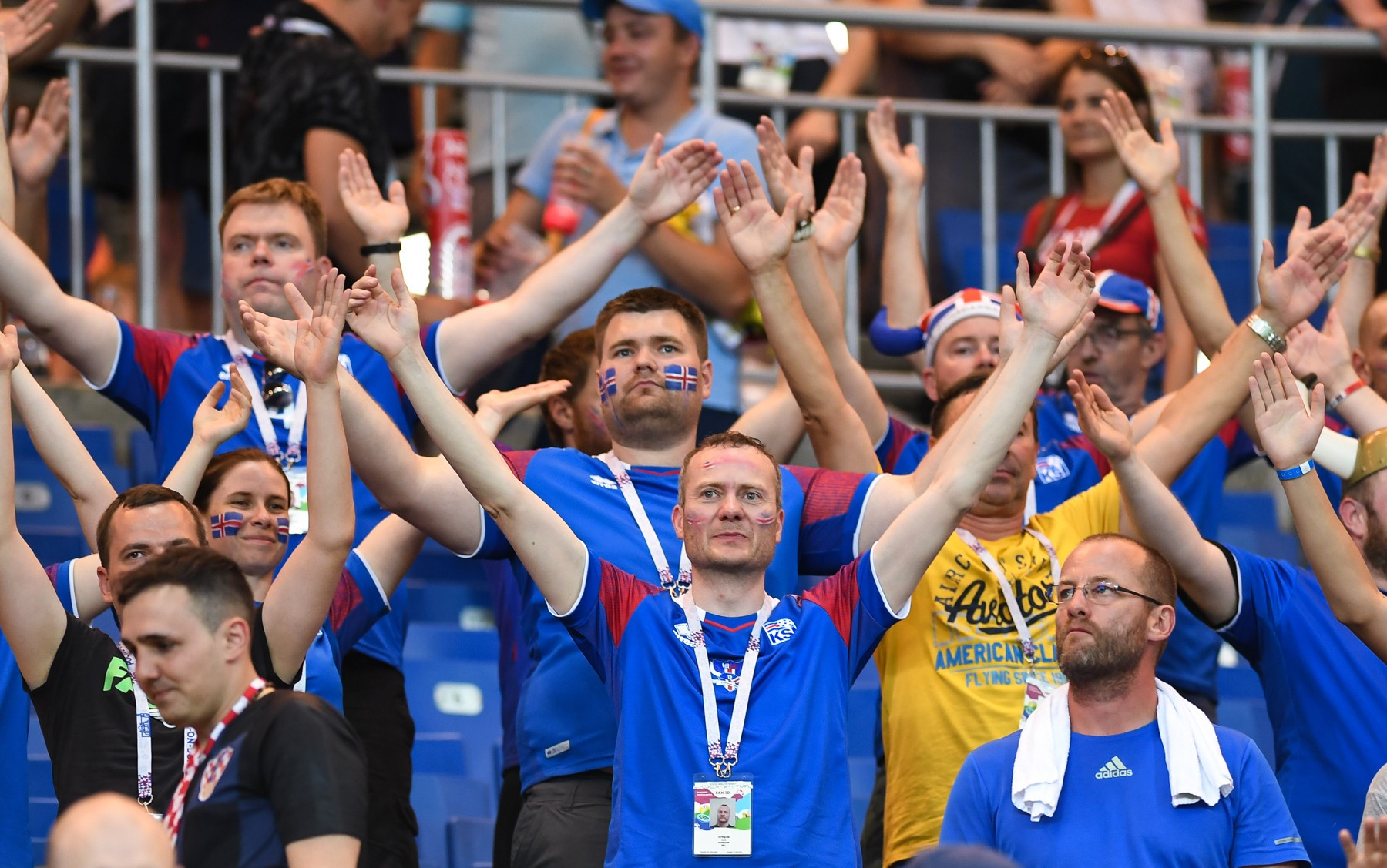
'Viking clapping' of Iceland fans

During UEFA Euro 2016, Iceland's fans became widely known for their 'volcano clap' (or 'Viking clap') with a 'huh' chant, though it originated with fans of Scottish club Motherwell F.C. Canberra Raiders fans subsequently adopted the 'Viking clap'. Similarly, fans of the Minnesota Vikings have also adopted the 'Viking clap' to show support for the team, chanting 'skol' rather than the original 'huh' chant.

In the mid 2010s, a practice of clapping as a way to emphasize talking points emerged among African American women, especially when clapping out individual syllables in words. This was pointed out in popular media by the comedian Robin Thede on The Nightly Show with Larry Wilmore. It has since become more widely applied both online, often using the "hand clap" emoji, and in person.

== See also ==
- Applause
- Chest physiotherapy
- The Clapper
- Clapper (musical instrument)
- Clapping game
- Concert etiquette
- Finger snapping
- Palmas (music)
- Pat-a-cake
- Tejime
- The Clapping Song
