= Olga Kern =

Russian-American pianist (born 1975)

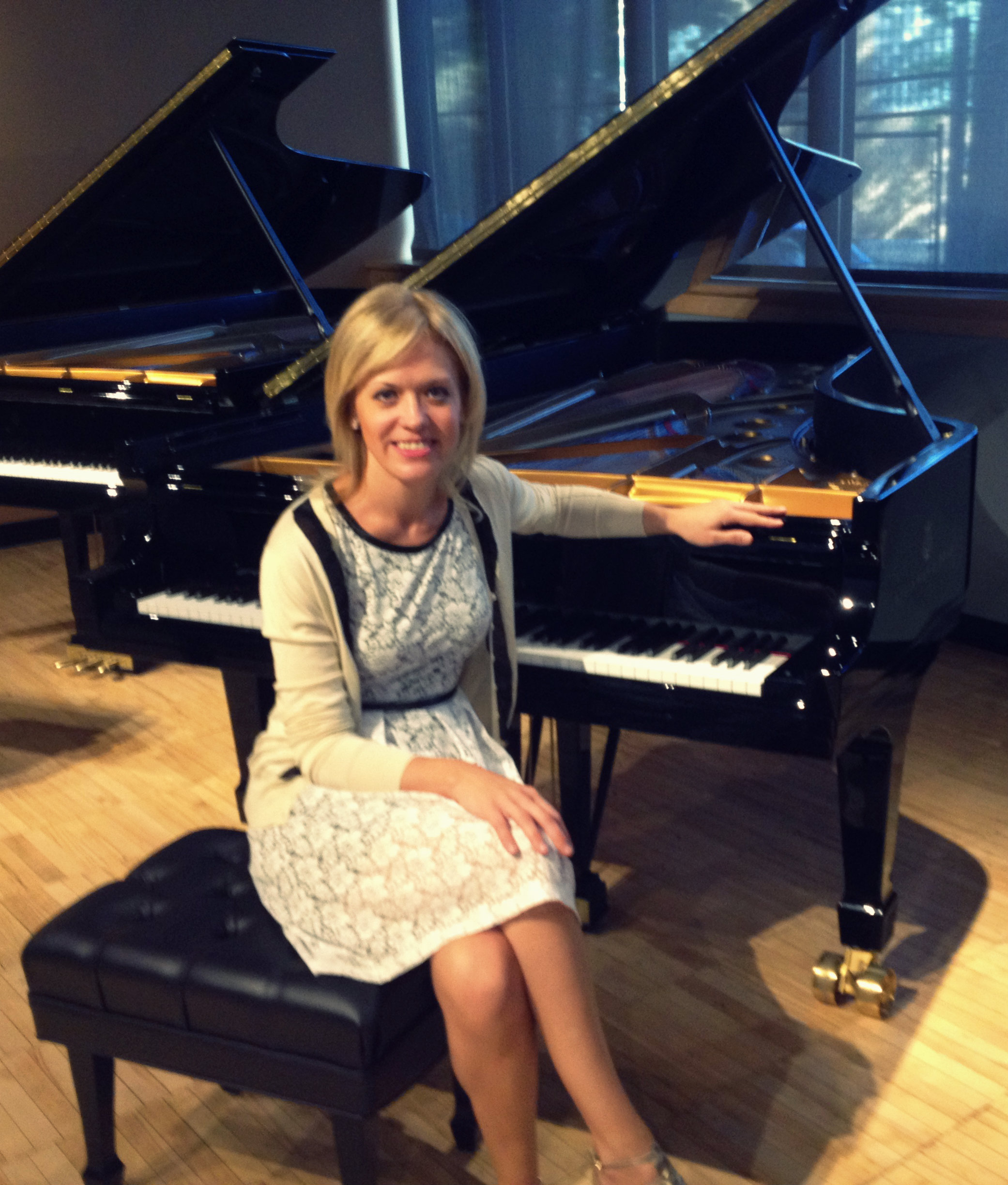
- Olga Kern

Background information
- Born: Olga Vladimirovna Pushechnikova; 23 April 1975 (age 51); Moscow, Russia
- Genres: Classical
- Instrument: Piano
- Label: Harmonia Mundi
- Website: olgakern.com

Olga Vladimirovna Kern (Note: Russian: Ольга Владимировна Керн) (née Pushechnikova, (Note: Russian: Ольга Владимировна Пушечникова) 23 April 1975) is a Russian and American classical pianist. She became a US citizen in 2016.

== Early life ==
Kern was born Olga Vladimirovna Pushechnikova (Russian: Ольга Владимировна Пушечникова) on 23 April 1975 in Moscow, Russian SFSR. Her parents are both pianists, and she is related to the Russian socialite and memoirist Anna Petrovna Kern. Her great-grandmother was the mezzo-soprano Vera Pushechnikova. Kern began studying piano at age five with Professor Evgeny Timakin at the Central Music School of Moscow and gave her first concert at age seven in the same city. She won her first international competition, the Concertino Praga Competition, at age 11 in Czechoslovakia. At 17, she won first prize at the first Rachmaninoff International Piano Competition. While in school, she received an honorary scholarship from the president of Russia Boris Yeltsin in 1996.

== Career ==
=== Early career ===
Kern continued her studies at the Moscow Conservatory with Professor Sergei Dorensky and continued her postgraduate studies at the same school. She also studied with Professor Boris Petrushansky at the Accademia Pianistica 'Incontri col Maestro' in Imola. She adopted her mother's surname, Kern, professionally as her international career developed. From 1989 to 1994, Kern held a scholarship with the “New Names” Foundation.

=== Van Cliburn International Piano Competition ===
Kern attended the Tenth Van Cliburn International Piano Competition in 1997 and did not progress past the R1 level. Kern attained international prominence when she became the first woman in over thirty years to receive the Nancy Lee and Perry R. Bass Gold Medal in the Eleventh Van Cliburn International Piano Competition in June 2001, which she won jointly with Stanislav Ioudenitch. She appears in three documentaries about the competition: Playing on the Edge (2001), They Came to Play (2008), and The Cliburn: 50 Years of Gold. An additional documentary was made about Kern following the 2001 Van Cliburn competition, titled Olga's Journey (2003).

=== Pedagogy ===
Besides performing, Kern is an active music pedagogue, and has conducted master classes at such locations as Yale University, the Royal Conservatoire of Scotland, and New York City's 92nd Street Y. Kern has been a jury member for several international competitions including Grand Prix Animato in Paris, France; the Scottish International Piano Competition in Glasgow, Scotland; Amadeus Competition in Brno, Czech Republic; and the Top of the World International Piano Competition in Tromsø, Norway. Kern was jury chairman for the Seventh Cliburn International Amateur Piano Competition in June 2016.

Kern is a corresponding member of the Russian Academy of Sciences’s Division of the Arts. She was artistic director of the Cape Town Summer Festival from 2006 to 2011 and frequently returns. In September 2017, Kern joined the piano faculty of the Manhattan School of Music.

== Olga Kern International Piano Competition ==
In 2016, Kern launched the Olga Kern International Piano Competition for pianists between the ages of 18 and 32. Taking place every three years in Albuquerque, New Mexico, the competition's mission is to "provide the venue for young pianists to develop international careers through a competition that is recognized globally for its value and excellence." Kern serves as artistic director and president of the jury.

The inaugural competition took place in Albuquerque November 13–20, 2016. Twenty-two contestants representing fourteen countries were chosen from submitted video auditions and judged by Kern along with eight other internationally recognized judges. The competition gave away a total of $30,000 in prize money with the winner receiving $11,000 along with a professional recording on the Steinway & Sons Label and tours throughout Europe and the United States. Vladimir Kern conducted the finalist concert with the New Mexico Philharmonic.

In honor of the festival and of Kern, Albuquerque mayor Richard Berry issued an executive order declaring November 20 "Olga Kern Day," coinciding with the final day of the competition.

=== Olga Kern International Piano Competition Awards ===
Year	First Prize	Second Prize	Third Prize	Fourth Prize
2016	Chen Guang (China)	Anna Dmytrenko (Ukraine)	Anastasiya Naplekova (Ukraine)	Joshua Rupley (United States)
2019	Tetiana Shafran (Ukraine)	Federico Gad Crema (Italy)	Simon Karakulidi (Russia)	Elizaveta Kliuchereva (Russia).
2022	Jonathan Mamora (United States)	Anthony Ratinov (United States)	Yanfeng Bai (China)	N/A

== Foundation ==
In 2012, Kern established the “Aspiration” foundation with her brother, conductor, composer, and teacher Vladimir Kern. The aim of the foundation is to provide financial and artistic assistance to developing young musicians throughout the world.

== Awards ==
Year	Event	Rank	Location
1986	Concertino Praga International Piano Competition	1st	Prague
1993	Rachmaninoff International Piano Competition	1st	Moscow, Russia
1996	Viotti International Piano Competition	2nd	Vercelli, Italy
1996	Unisa International Piano Competition	4th	Pretoria, South Africa
1999	Ettore Pozzoli International Piano Competition	1st	Seregno, Italy
1999	Beijing International Piano Competition	3rd	Beijing, China
1999	Dino Ciani International Piano Competition	2nd	Milan
2000	Pinerolo International Piano Competition	1st	Pinerolo, Italy
2000	Cantù International Piano Competition	1st	Cantù, Italy
2000	Hamamatsu International Piano Competition	3rd	Hamamatsu, Japan
2001	Morocco International Piano Competition	1st	Casablanca
2001	Van Cliburn International Piano Competition	1st	Fort Worth, TX
2017	Ellis Island Medal of Honor	-	United States

== Recordings ==
Year	Album	Label
2001	The Cliburn: Playing on the Edge	Peter Rosen Productions DVD
2001	Gold Medalist: 11th Van Cliburn International Piano Competition	Harmonia Mundi
2003	Tchaikovsky: Piano Concerto No. 1	Harmonia Mundi
2005	Rachmaninoff: Piano Sonata No. 2; Balakirev: Islamey	Harmonia Mundi
2006	Rachmaninoff: Transcriptions; Corelli Variations (GRAMMY nominated)	Harmonia Mundi
2006	Chopin: Piano Concerto No. 1	Harmonia Mundi
2007	Brahms: Variations Op. 21, 24, 35	Harmonia Mundi
2010	They Came to Play	Docurama Films DVD
2010	Chopin: Piano Sonatas 2 & 3	Harmonia Mundi
2011	Renée Fleming and Dmitri Hvorostovsky: A Musical Odyssey in St. Petersburg	Decca DVD
2012	Rachmaninoff: Cello Sonata (with Sol Gabetta)	Sony Classical
2022	Brahms: Piano Quintet and Shostakovich Piano Quintet with Dali Quartet	Delos

== Personal life ==
Kern lives in New York City. Her son is Vladislav Kern, who also plays the piano and graduated from Juilliard’s Pre-College School in May 2016.
