= Honens International Piano Competition =

Classical piano contest in Calgary, Canada

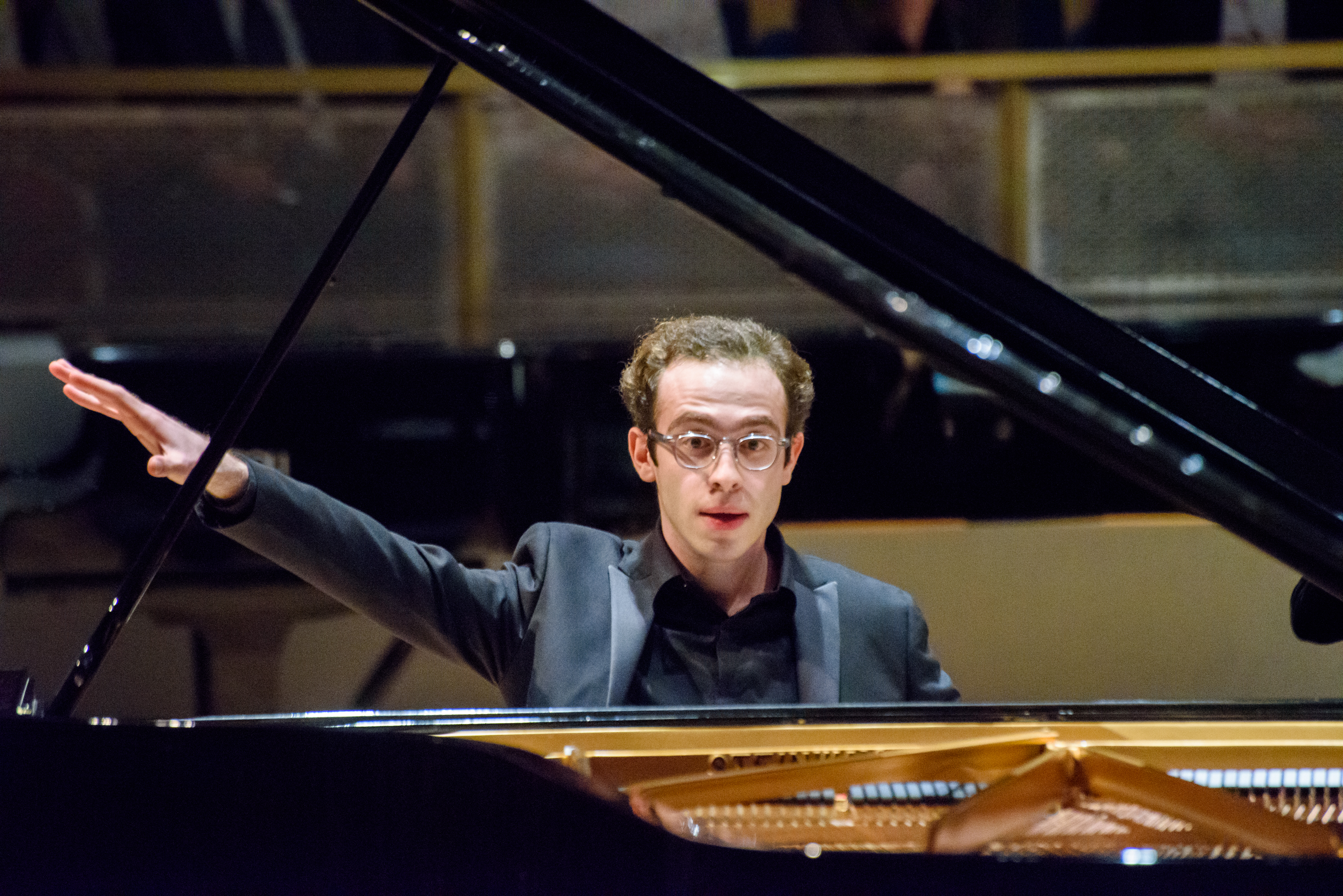
Nicolas Namoradze performs on the piano at the 2018 Honens International Piano Competition.

The Honens International Piano Competition is a triennial classical piano competition held in Calgary, Canada that awards prizes in classical piano performance.

In addition to monetary awards, the top prize winner receives access to a career development program that includes concert engagements, a recording, management, and a Banff Centre residency. It is the world's wealthiest piano competition, awarding some of the largest monetary prizes in the classical piano competition circuit. As of 2025, the cash prizes total just under $190,000.00 CAD; the total value of the awards (including the Artist Development Program) is worth nearly $700,000.00 CAD.

== Founding ==
In 1991, Esther Honens, a Canadian philanthropist, entrepreneur, and amateur pianist, created a $5 million endowment to host an international piano competition in her hometown of Calgary. Terminally, ill, she was nonetheless able to watch the inaugural competition in 1992 from a specially built box in the Jack Singer Concert Hall. She died shortly afterwards.

== Competition Format ==
Fifty quarterfinalists are chosen from a pool of international applicants. The quarterfinals are held in New York and Germany; ten pianists are selected to move on to semifinals in Calgary. These are then narrowed down to three finalists who complete for a monetary awards and a three-year career development program that includes artist management, international orchestral performances, production of professional recordings, and mentorship opportunities.

During the competition, contestants collaborate in performances with other musicians in chamber and vocal settings and concerto performances, in addition to playing self-programmed solo recitals, and participate in individual filmed interviews. Juries have typically mostly included active concert pianists, as well as representatives of music management. Competitors are encouraged to showcase themselves and their own artistry.

The competition has been a member of the World Federation of International Music Competitions since 1998. Steinway & Sons is the official sponsor of the competition, and in recent years has become the sole provider of instruments to the competition stage, offering a selection of Model D (concert grand pianos) from both the company's New York and Hamburg factories.

== Festival ==
Since 2014 the Competition has expanded to include a festival taking place in a variety of indoor and outdoor Calgary venues each year. The Honens Festival and Piano Competition earned a White Hat of the Year award from Tourism Calgary in 2015.

== Laureates ==
The Honens International Piano Competition named between three and five Laureates up to and including its 2009 competition. In 2012, 2015, 2018, and 2022, the competition used a sole Prize Laureate system. Starting in 2025, the three finalists were named as Gold, Silver, and Bronze Laureates.

1992

- Yi Wu (pianist)|Yi Wu, Argentina/China
- Krzysztof Jablonski (musician)|Krzysztof Jablonski, Poland
- Jean-Efflam Bavouzet, France
- Sergei Babayan, Armenia
- Dmitry Nesterov, Russia

1996

- Maxim Philippov, Russia
- Albert Tiu, Philippines
- Eugene Watanabe, United States

2000

- Katherine Chi, Canada
- Marko Martin, Estonia
- Alessandra Maria Ammara, Italy

2003

- Xiang Zou, China
- Winston Choi, Canada
- Roberto Plano, Italy

2006

- Minsoo Sohn, South Korea
- Hinrich Alpers, Germany
- Hong Xu, China

2009

- Georgy Tchaidze, Russia
- Evgeny Starodubtsev, Russia
- Gilles Vonsattel, Switzerland

2012

- Pavel Kolesnikov, Russia

2015

- Luca Buratto, Italy

2018

- Nicolas Namoradze, Georgia

2021

- The 2021 Honens International Piano Competition was postponed until 2022 because of the COVID-19 pandemic.

2022

- Illia Ovcharenko, Ukraine

2025

- Élisabeth Pion, Canada - Gold Laureate
- Carter Johnson, Canada - Silver Laureate
- Anastasia Vorotnaya, Russia - Bronze Laureate
