= Egle =

Egle or EGLE may refer to:

- Eglė, a Lithuanian feminine given name
- Egle (fly), a genus in the family Anthomyiidae
- Eglė the Queen of Serpents, a Lithuanian folktale
- Every Ghanaian Living Everywhere, a political party in Ghana
- Michigan Department of Environment, Great Lakes, and Energy
- Eglė Vilnius, Lithuanian handball club

== People with the surname ==
- Juergen Egle, Austrian para-alpine skier
- Madeleine Egle (born 1988), Austrian luger
- Selina Egle (born 2003), Austrian luger

== See also ==
- Eagle (disambiguation)
