= Sergei Babayan =

Armenian-American pianist (born 1961)

- Born: January 1, 1961 (age 65); Gyumri, Armenian SSR, Soviet Union
- Genres: Classical music
- Occupation: Pianist
- Instrument: Piano
- Label: Deutsche Grammophon
- Website: sergeibabayan.com

Sergei Babayan (Armenian: Սերգեյ Բաբայան; born 1 January 1961) is an Armenian-American pianist. Described by Le Devoir as a "genius", Babayan won many international competitions, including the Robert Casadesus International Piano Competition in 1989 and the Hamamatsu International Piano Competition in 1991. He appears as soloist with leading orchestras, including the Cleveland Orchestra, Gewandhausorchester, London Symphony Orchestra, Bamberger Symphoniker, and the Mariinsky Theatre Orchestra, under such conductors as Valery Gergiev, Yuri Temirkanov, Tugan Sokhiev, Neeme Järvi, Rafael Payare, and David Robertson. He served as artist-in-residence at the Cleveland Institute of Music from 1992 to 2024 and currently teaches at both The Juilliard School and Southern Methodist University's Meadows School of the Arts.

== Biography ==
Babayan was born in Gyumri, Armenian Soviet Socialist Republic, Soviet Union, and began his musical studies at age six with Luiza Markaryan, then was taught by pianist Georgy Saradjev, a leading representative of the St Petersburg school and former student of Vladimir Sofronitsky. He later studied under Lev Naumov, Vera Gornostayeva and Mikhail Pletnev at the Moscow Conservatory.

In 1989, he traveled to the United States. That same year he won first prize in the Cleveland International Piano Competition and the Robert Casadesus International Piano Competition. After he won first prize in the Palm Beach International Piano Competition and first prize in the Hamamatsu International Piano Competition, Babayan won first prize in the Scottish International Piano Competition in Glasgow in 1992 and third prize at the Busoni International Piano Competition.

His programming covers a wide range of repertoire, often including baroque and classical composers such as Johann Sebastian Bach, Jean-Philippe Rameau, Domenico Scarlatti, Wolfgang Amadeus Mozart and Ludwig van Beethoven, Romantic composers such as Sergei Rachmaninoff, and modern works by composers such as Witold Lutosławski, György Ligeti, Vladimir Ryabov and Arvo Pärt. He is particularly recognized for his prominent interpretations of Johann Sebastian Bach. He frequently appears as a soloist with such orchestras as Gewandhausorchester, Rotterdam Philharmonic, The National Orchestra of Belgium, The Cleveland Orchestra, NDR Elbphilharmonie Orchester, and the Czech State Philharmonic. Babayan has performed at Carnegie Hall, Wigmore Hall, the Théâtre des Champs-Élysées, Konzerthaus Berlin and Munich's Prinzregententheater, appeared at the Salzburger Festspiele, Verbier Festival and Festival de La Roque-d'Anthéron festivals.

Babayan has collaborated with such conductors as Valery Gergiev, Yuri Temirkanov, Neeme Järvi, David Robertson, Rafael Payare, Gábor Takács-Nagy, Nikolaj Znaider and Tugan Sokhiev. He has recorded with Deutsche Grammophon, the Connoisseur Society label, Discover Records and Pro Piano Records.

Babayan served as artist-in-residence at the Cleveland Institute of Music from 1992 to 2024. His students have included the pianists Ching-Yun Hu, Second Prize winner of the 2008 Arthur Rubinstein Competition; Stanislav Khristenko, winner of Cleveland International Piano Competition and fourth prize winner at the 2013 Queen Elisabeth Competition, and Daniil Trifonov, Third Prize winner of 2010 International Chopin Piano Competition, First Prize winner of the 2011 Arthur Rubinstein Competition, and First Prize winner of the 2011 Tchaikovsky Competition. Since 2013 Babayan is also a member of the faculty at The Juilliard School, and in 2023 joined the faculty of Southern Methodist University's Meadows School of the Arts; he currently serves as Meadows' Joel Estes Tate Endowed Chair in Piano and artist-in-residence.

In 2015, Babayan performed two Prokofiev concertos at BBC Proms with Valery Gergiev and London Symphony Orchestra. In November 2019 Sergei Babayan was Curating Artist at Konzerthaus Dortmund, where he presented a festival of performances with close musical friends, including Martha Argerich, Daniil Trifonov, Mischa Maisky, Sergey Khachatryan, and Valery Gergiev and the Mariinsky Orchestra.

In July 2018, Babayan signed an exclusive recording contract with Deutsche Grammophon. Babayan's first album for Deutsche Grammophon was released in March 2018. Prokofiev for Two, for which he formed a duo partnership with Martha Argerich, comprises Babayan's transcriptions for piano four hands of movements from Prokofiev's Romeo and Juliet and other works.
