= Nicolas Namoradze =

Classical musician, pianist, composer from Georgia (born 1992)

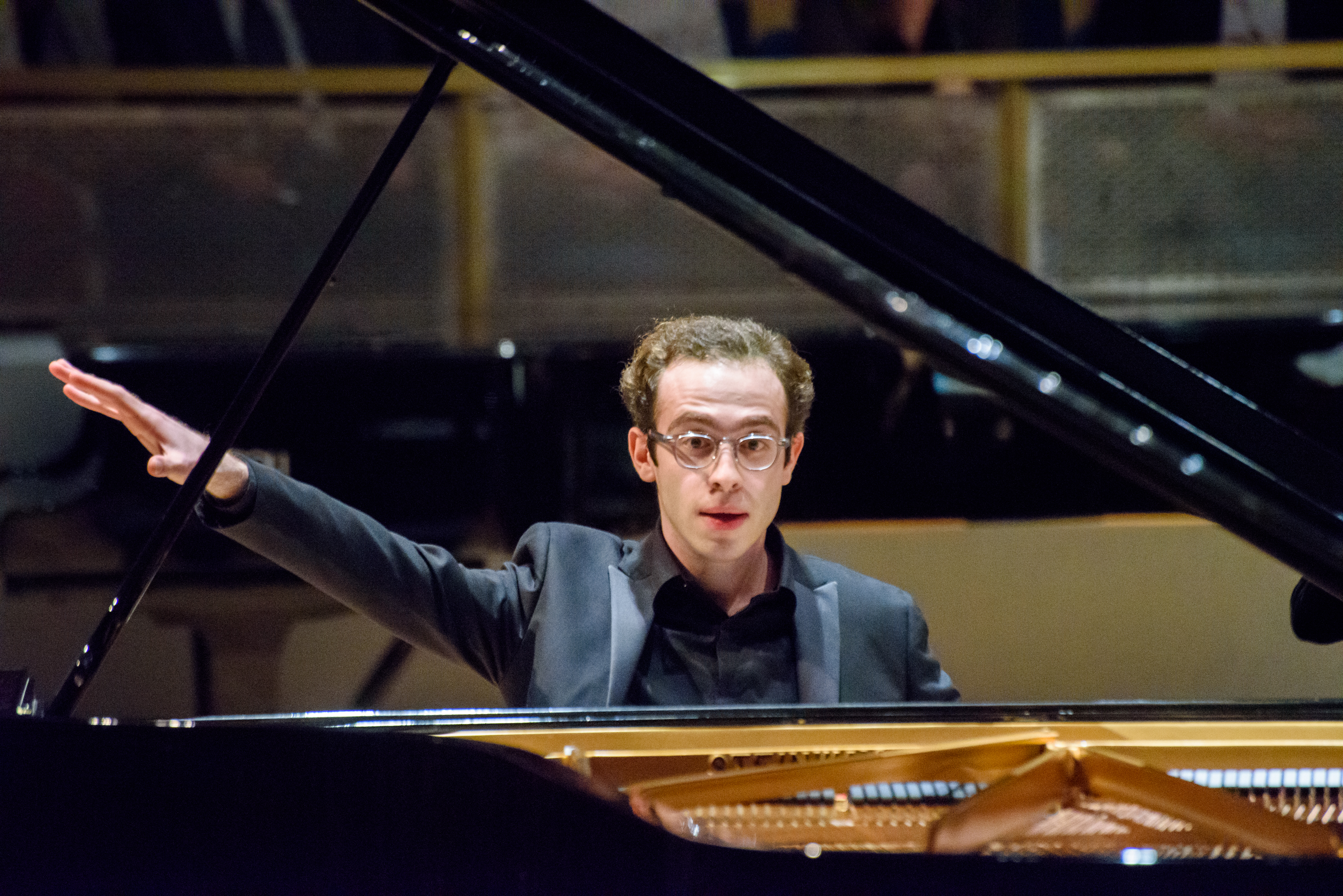
- Namoradze at the 2018 Honens International Piano Competition

Background information
- Born: August 19, 1992 (age 32); Tbilisi, Georgia
- Genres: classical music contemporary
- Years active: 2013–present
- Labels: Hyperion Records; Steinway & Sons; Honens; Edition Klavier-Festival Ruhr
- Website: nicolasnamoradze.com

Nicolas Namoradze (born 19 August 1992) is a classical pianist, composer, and educator. He came to international attention in 2018 upon winning the triennial Honens International Piano Competition, one of the world's largest and most comprehensive prizes for pianists, in Calgary, Canada.

== Early life and education ==
Born in Tbilisi, Georgia, he grew up in Budapest, Hungary, where he began piano lessons at age seven and attended the Liszt University of Music and a British international school. He made his orchestral debut at age 12.

Upon hearing Namoradze while rehearsing with the Budapest Festival Orchestra, Emanuel Ax suggested he move to New York City and study with him at the Juilliard School. Namoradze followed this advice, and after completing his undergraduate studies in Budapest, Vienna, and Florence, he moved to New York in 2013 to study with Ax. In 2015 he earned his master's degree at Juilliard, followed in 2020 by his doctorate at the City University of New York Graduate Center, where he held the Graduate Center Fellowship, with a dissertation on Macroharmony in Ligeti's Etudes, Book 3.

In addition to Emanuel Ax, his teachers included Zoltán Kocsis, András Schiff, Eliso Virsaladze, and Yoheved Kaplinsky for piano, and John Corigliano for composition. Ax described him as "set to become one of the truly important artists of his generation".

Unusually for a musician in the early stages of an extremely promising career, from 2014 to 2018 he mostly withdrew from performance and competitions to explore his artistic voice as a composer and to pursue his academic studies, before entering and winning the triennial Honens International Piano Competition. During that period he made a limited number of concert appearances, such as at the Chelsea Music Festival in New York in 2015.

From 2016 to 2019 he was on the faculty of Queens College, New York, where he taught chamber music, composition, and music history.

== 2018: Honens Prize ==
He won the 2018 Honens Competition, one of the world's largest piano prizes, with a performance in the semifinals of his own Etudes and, in the finale, of the Brahms Piano Concerto No. 2. The cash prize of CA$100,000 was accompanied by a comprehensive artist development program that included concert engagements, recordings, management, publicity support, and a Banff Centre residency.

The honor also garnered him recording contracts with Hyperion Records and with the Steinway & Sons label, with releases also on the Honens and Edition Klavier-Festival Ruhr labels, and tours in Japan, Canada, and the U.S., including debut concerts at Wigmore Hall (London), Konzerthaus Berlin, Tokyo Bunka Kaikan, Toppan Hall (Japan), deSingel (Belgium), and Carnegie Hall (New York), where the program included his own Etudes and the world premiere of his "Arabesque" along with Bach, Scriabin and Schumann. Reviewing one of Namoradze's concerts following the Honens award, the Calgary Herald wrote that his performance of Scriabin was "the last word in how this music might be played".

== 2020–present ==
Before the COVID-19 pandemic interrupted artists' touring schedules, his 2020 bookings included concerts in Israel, Berlin, Boston, Japan, and the Beethoven 250th Anniversary celebrations in October with the London Philharmonic Orchestra.

In January 2021 his album York Bowen: Fragments from Hans Andersen & Studies debuted on the UK charts as the No. 1-selling classical instrumental album. It was a Gramophone "Best New Classical Albums" Editor's Choice", BBC Music Magazine's Instrumental Disc of the Month, a Presto Editor's Choice, and the winner of the Choc de Classica. The following month, Limelight named it its Recording of the Month. and Musical America named Namoradze its New Artist of the Month.

He was pictured on the cover of the January/February 2022 issue of International Piano Magazine as his third album, Arabesque: Piano Music of Schumann and Namoradze, which included his own compositions, came out in January on the Steinway & Sons label.

== Compositions ==
Namoradze's compositions include solo piano works, chamber music, and electronic music. He has produced soundtracks for feature films and videos, including Fabienne Verdier's short films Walking Painting and Nuit d'Opéra à Aix (2017) made in association with the Aix-en-Provence Festival. His compositions are published by Muse Press.

== Neuropsychology research ==
Also a postgraduate student of neuropsychology at the Institute of Psychiatry, Psychology and Neuroscience at King's College London, Namoradze researches the effects of mental practice and mindfulness on musical performance, auditory perception, and the effect of music on the brain, and gives combined lecture/concerts on the subject.

He is based in New York City.

== Discography ==
- Nicolas Namoradze: Live at Honens 2018 (2019, Honens)
- York Bowen: Fragments from Hans Andersen Opp. 58 & 61; 12 Studies Op. 46; 2 Concert Studies (2021, Hyperion)
- Arabesque: Piano Music of Schumann and Namoradze (2022, Steinway & Sons)

== Works ==
Title	Year	Instrumentation/medium	Commissioned by
Moon, Refracted: A Variation on Rentarō Taki's 'Kōjō no Tsuki'	2019	Piano	
Sonata for Violin and Piano	2018	Violin and piano	Tessa Lark
Arabesque	2018	Piano	
Etudes I–VI	2015–19	Piano	
Nuit d'Opéra à Aix	2017	Music for film	Dir. Martin Baizeau, prod. Aix-en-Provence Festival
Walking Painting	2016	Music for film	Dir. Fabienne Verdier, prod. atelier Fabienne Verdier
Partita for Keyboard Ensemble	2016	Clavichord, harpsichord, organ, piano, toy piano	Chelsea Music Festival
"Gravity" Concerto for Double Bass and String Ensemble	2016	Double nass and string ensemble	Chelsea Music Festival
"An Unlikely Friendship"	2016	Voice, harpsichord and electronics	
"eau"	2016	Cello and Electronics	
"Bell Fields"	2016		Audiovisual work with digital animator Kati Vilim
Spiele im Spiegel	2015	Electronic	
Three Overtunes	2015	Electronic	
Theme and Variation for Violin and Piano	2015	Violin and piano	Tessa Lark
Transformations for String Quartet	2015	String quartet	Chelsea Music Festival
"entre ciel et terre"	2014	Cello and electronics	
Chorale Variations	2014	Piano	
Georgian Chorales and Postludes	2014	Piano	
Suite in C for Woodwind Quartet	2014	Flute, oboe, clarinet, bassoon	
