= Kim Dae-jin (pianist) =

South Korean pianist

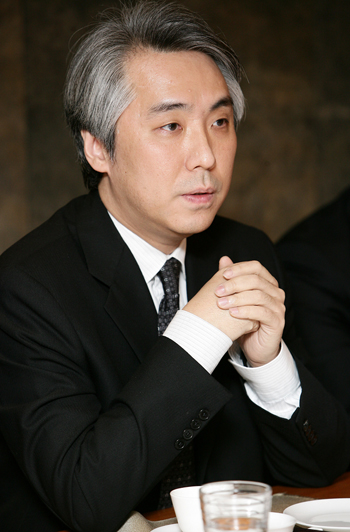
Daejin Kim, Interview for the Korea International Competition for Young Pianists on August 23, 2013.

Daejin Kim is a South Korean pianist. An alumnus of the Juilliard School, he won first prize in the 6th Robert Casadesus International Piano Competition in 1985. Kim is a professor of piano, the president of the Korea National University of Arts, and the music director of the Changwon Philharmonic Orchestra.

== Early performances ==
In 1986, Kim made his New York City debut and received a favorable review from the New York Times:

Daejin Kim demonstrated all the accouterments necessary for a successful solo career. Kim has what seems to be a foolproof technique and his careful choice of music showed a musician interested in subtleties, not just the usual frontal assaults of bravura repertory. This is a fine young musician, one with the physical means to express his considerable musical intelligence.

In 1987, he was invited to perform with the Cleveland Orchestra and since then his international career has taken him to major concert halls in Europe, Asia and the United States as soloist with the Juilliard Symphony Orchestra, the White Plains Symphony Orchestra, the Orchestra Nationale de Lille and the Pasdeloup Orchestra in France, and the Sofia State Symphony Orchestra among others, with such noted conductors as Dmitri Kitaenko, Kenneth Schermerhorn, Jahja Ling, Jean-Claude Casadesus and Marek Janowski.

== Move to South Korea ==
In 1994, Kim and his family moved to South Korea. Since then he has been pursuing dual careers as a concert artist and a teacher. His master classes have drawn international recognition and at the same time, he has been able to maintain a full schedule of performances, besides many appearances as a chamber musician and collaborator, such as the national recital tour (1995), the Schubert Bicentennial Celebration recital (1997) and appearances with all the major symphony orchestras including the Korean Symphony Orchestra, the Seoul Philharmonic Orchestra. He appeared under the direction of Dmitri Kitaenko with the KBS Symphony Orchestra playing Schumann's Piano Concerto. That performance led him to appear as soloist with the Seoul Philharmonic Orchestra to perform two consecutive Chopin's piano concertos in the 1998 Orchestra Festival, a Korean music festival presented by the Seoul Arts Center. In 2000, he gave a one-day performance of all of Beethoven's piano concertos. In 2001, he started the cycle of the complete Mozart piano concertos which concluded in 2005. He has also released three recordings, "4 Ballades by Chopin & 8 Nocturnes by Poulenc" (Arcadia label), "The Complete Nocturnes of John Field", and "The Complete Nocturnes of Chopin" (Monopoly label). In October 2004, his recording of two piano concertos by Mozart, wherein he conducted the Polish National Symphony Orchestra from the keyboard, was released.

== Education and faculty positions ==
Kim holds Bachelor's, Master's and Doctoral degrees from the Juilliard School. He has been a member of the associate faculty at the Manhattan School of Music and guest artist faculty at the Ishikawa Music Academy in Japan. He is a currently Professor at the Korea National University of Arts. His students have won the prizes in the major international competitions such as the Busoni, the Viotti, the Ettlingen, the Oberlin, the Cleveland, the Sendai (Japan), the Epina, the Maria Canals International Competitions, Busoni Competition, and first prize at the 2005 Clara Haskil International Piano Competition, first prize at the 2006 Leeds Piano Competition and second prize at the Tchaikovsky International Competition in 2011.

== Honors ==
In 1985, Kim won the first prize in the 6th Robert Casadesus International Piano Competition held in Cleveland. In recognition of his achievements both in Korea and aboard, he also received the 18th Nan-Pa Music Award.

In 2002, he was awarded the "musician of the year" prize by the Music Association of Korea. He was also named "the most famous pianist in Korea" by the national newspaper, The Dong-A Ilbo. In 2006, he was decorated as "Artist of the Year" by South Korea's Ministry of Culture, Sports and Tourism. He received an honorary invitation from Yale University and Rutgers University to be a visiting professor.

== Other activities ==
Kim has been a jury member for competitions such as the Busoni, the Gina Bachauer, Clara Haskil, the Beethoven (Bonn), the Cleveland International Piano Competition, the Sendai, the Hamamatsu in Japan and the Paderewski, the Rachmaninov (Moscow), the China International Competition, Leeds International Competition, and Queen Elisabeth among others.

After close collaboration with the Suwon Philharmonic Orchestra as soloist and conductor for many years, he became its Conductor and Music Director in 2008. In 2013, Kim and the Suwon Philharmonic Orchestra made their debut concert at Carnegie Hall. Kim is now making the complete cycle of Beethoven Symphonies and Concertos.
