= Gulnora Alimova =

Uzbek pianist (born 1971)

Gulnora Alimova (born July 25, 1971) is an Uzbek pianist.

== Early life and career ==
Alimova was born on July 25, 1971, in Tashkent, she studied under A. Neuwirth, and subsequently at the Aschrafi State Conservatory in Tashkent under Prof. O. Yussupova. She took her postgraduate studies at the Moscow Conservatory under Prof. Lev Naumov, graduating in 1997.

Alimova was awarded a Medal of the Ville d’Epinal in the 1993 Epinal International Piano Competition 2nd prizes at the 1993 Cidade do Porto, 1996 Cidade de Ferrol, 2004 Mannheim's Beethoven and, most notably, 1997 Cleveland competitions.

In 2000, Gulnora Alimova became a scholarship holder of the Kulturfonds - Baden e.V., and in 2003 she was a scholarship holder of the DAAD. In 2004, she received the 2nd place award at the 3rd Beethoven Piano Competition Richard Laugs in Mannheim.

Since June 2009, Gulnora Alimova has been employed on the academic staff at the Hochschule für Musik und Darstellende Kunst Mannheim (Mannheim University of Music and Performing Arts).
