= Per Tengstrand =

Swedish pianist

Per Tengstrand (born 1968, Växjö, Sweden) is a Swedish pianist.

== Biography ==
Tengstrand started to play the piano at age 6, being taught by his mother. He entered the Malmö Academy of Music at age 16, in the class of Hans Pålsson. In 1985, he was accepted at the Conservatoire de Paris in the class of Dominique Merlet. Three years later, he obtained a Premier Prix, Premier nommé, and Prix Special du Jury at the Paris Conservatory. He continued private studies with Dominique Weber and Romuald Sztern to prepare for international piano competitions.

In 1995 he attained the Long-Thibaud Competition's 4th prize. He subsequently was awarded the 1996 Geneva Competition's 2nd prize (1st prize void) and won the 1997 Cleveland International Piano Competition. He has been internationally active as a concert pianist since. He is the artistic director of a festival in Växjö, Sweden called Tengstrand Festival and the Music on Park Avenue series in New York.

== Personal life ==
Per Tengstrand lives in Princeton, NJ with his wife Shan-shan Sun.

== Honors ==
In 2005, he was decorated by King Carl XVI Gustaf of Sweden with the Royal Medal Litteris et Artibus for outstanding service to the arts.
