= Charlotte Hu =

Taiwanese pianist

- 胡瀞云
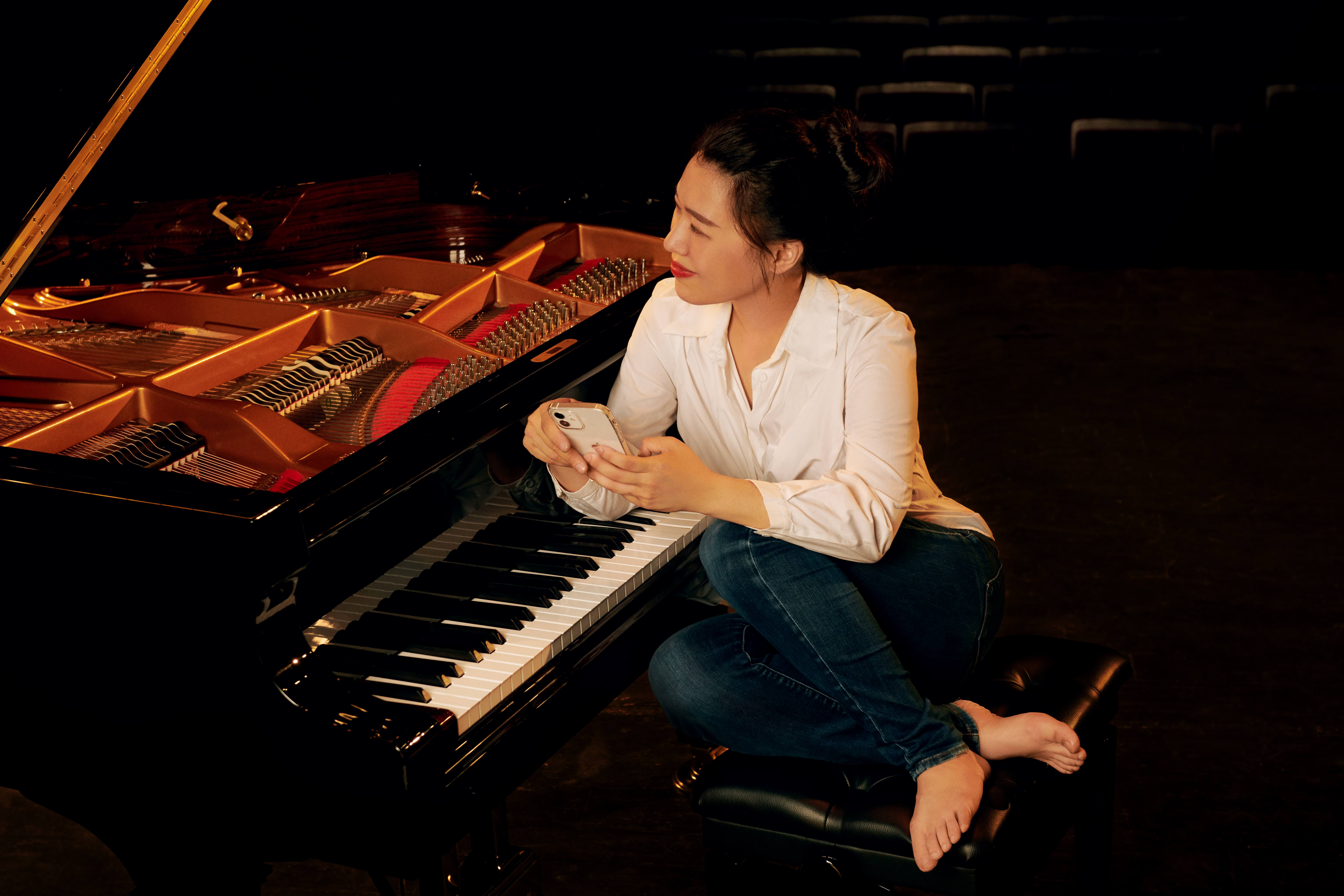
- Charlotte Hu in front of a piano
- Born: Ching-Yun Hu; Taipei, Taiwan
- Citizenship: Taiwan; United States
- Occupation: Pianist
- Website: www.charlottehu.com

Ching-Yun "Charlotte" Hu (Chinese: 胡瀞云) is a Taiwanese-born American classical pianist. She won the 2008 Arthur Rubinstein International Piano Competition and the 2012 Golden Melody Award for Best Classical Album. She founded the Yun-Hsiang International Music Festival in Taipei.

== Early life ==
Hu was born in Taipei. She made her concerto debut at the age of 13 with the Poland Capella Cracoviensis Chamber Orchestra. At the age of 14, she moved to the United States to study at the Juilliard School Pre-College Division. In 1999, at age 16, Hu won the Silver Medal at the Taipei International Piano Competition as the youngest competitor. She would go on to earn her Bachelor's and master's degrees from the Juilliard School, studying with Herbert Stessin and Oxana Yablonskaya. She later studied with Sergei Babayan at the Cleveland Institute of Music, and with Karl-Heinz Kämmerling at the Hochschule für Musik, Theater und Medien Hannover, Germany.

== Career ==
In 1996, Charlotte Hu moved to the United States to attend The Juilliard School's Pre-College Division. She attended the Aspen Music Festival in the following year and won the Aspen Concerto Competition, performing the Prokofiev Concerto No. 3 with the Aspen Concert Orchestra. The same season, she won the Philadelphia Orchestra Greenfield Competition, which resulted in her debut with the Philadelphia Orchestra, where she performed the Grieg Piano Concerto in a sold concert. She debuted in Europe in 1999 at the Chopin International Music Festival in Duszniki-Zdrój, Poland and gave a recital at the Kleine Zaal of Concertgebouw in Amsterdam in 2000. She made her recital debut at Alice Tully Hall in Lincoln Center in 2007, and subsequently returned in 2009.

In 2008, Charlotte Hu won the top prize of the 12th Rubinstein International Piano Master Competition in Tel Aviv, playing with the Israel Philharmonic Orchestra in the Semi-Final and Final. She was also awarded the Audience Favorite Prize. A week after the completion of the competition, she stepped in for Helene Grimaud in Beethoven Concerto No. 1 with the Israel Philharmonic Orchestra, In the two seasons after winning the Rubinstein Competition, she debuted at the Wigmore Hall in London, Klavier-Ruhr Festival, Herkulesaal in Munich, Tel Aviv Opera House, Salle Cortet in Paris, Rubinstein Hall in Lódz Poland, and at the Great Hall of Liszt Academy in Budapest, an invitation from conductor and pianist Tamas Vasary. She was a soloist with the Israel Symphony Orchestra, Johannesburg Philharmonic Orchestra, National Symphony Orchestra of Taiwan.

Following the Rubinstein Competition, Charlotte Hu won the 2009 Concert Artists Guild International Competition in New York, and signed a contract under CAG Artist Management. In the following seasons, she performed in many prestigious concert series in the United States and abroad, including her debut at Carnegie Hall's Weill's Recital Hall, her orchestra debut in São Paulo, across Europe at Bridgewater Hall in Manchester, UK and Munich's Gasteig, and gave a ten-concert tour of South Africa.

Throughout her career, Hu has been supported by the Puffin Foundation in United States, Chi-Mei Foundation in Taiwan, Solti Foundation in Belgium, Hattori Foundation in London, and the Education and Cultural Committees in Taiwan.

A tireless advocate for music education, Charlotte raised US$27,000 for youth education charities through a Hope Charity Concert live-streamed on her Facebook page in June 2020. The all-Liszt program, featuring some of the composer’s most moving transcriptions of German lieder, reached more than 140,000 people across the globe.

A Steinway Artist, Charlotte serves as artist in residence and piano faculty at Temple University in Philadelphia, in addition to her busy schedule leading master classes and artist residencies at universities and music festivals worldwide.

== Golden Melody Awards ==
Charlotte Hu released her debut album "Chopin" under Taiwanese label ArchiMusic in April, 2011. The album was nominated for two Golden Melodies in 2012 for "Best Performance" and "Best Classical Album of the Year. It won the Golden Melody "Best Classical Album of the Year."

== Yun-Hsiang International Music Festival ==
Enthusiastic in promoting Taiwanese musicians, music and helping young artists from her country, in 2011, Charlotte Hu founded the Yun-Hsiang Foundation and Yun-Hsiang International Music Festival in 2011. The first festival was held in Taipei in November, 2012. The Festival hosts 16 masterclasses by the festival artists, the Yun-Hsiang Concerto Competition, four concerts of solo and concerto programs at the National Theater and Concert Hall, Taipei. The artist roster of the 2012 Festival includes pianist Sergei Babayan, violinists Grzegorz Kotow, Daniel Shien-Ta Su, cellists Adrian Brendel, Ouyang YiLing, conductor James P. Liu of the Wuhan Philharmonic Orchestra, and the Evergreen Symphony Orchestra, in addition to performances by Hu.

== Philadelphia Young Pianists' Academy (PYPA) ==
Charlotte Hu founded the Philadelphia Young Pianists’ Academy (PYPA)) in 2013. Now in its 12th year in 2024, PYPA has become an important fixture in the classical music world, providing opportunities for young pianists to achieve their dreams of becoming professional musicians while cultivating a deeper appreciation for classical music and serving as a bridge of cultural partnerships between West and East. PYPA has presented over one-hundred-fifty concerts in person and online, and over one thousand hours of masterclasses by world-renowned musicians at the Curtis Institute of Music, Academy of Vocal Arts and Kimmel Center for the Performing Arts.

== Awards and recognitions ==
- 1998 Silver Medal & Most Potential Pianist Award - Taipei International Piano Competition
- 1999 Silver Medal - Chopin International Piano Competition of Taipei
- 1999 Young Artist Award - Chi-Mei Music & Art Foundation, Taiwan
- 2001 Rising Star Award - National Cultural Committee & Chiang Kai-Shek Concert Halls, Taiwan
- 2001 1st Prize - Puigcerda International Piano Competition, Spain
- 2003 Gold Medal and 1st Prize - California International Piano Competition, California
- 2005 1st Prize - Seiler International Piano Competition - Artist Division, New York
- 2006 1st Prize - Olga Koussetvitsky International Piano Competition, New York
- 2007 Gold Medal & First Prize - World Piano Competition, Ohio
- 2008 Silver Medal & Audience Favorite Prize (no first prize awarded) - Rubinstein International Piano Master Competition, Israel
- 2008 Honorary Award - Taiwan National Cultural Ministry, Taiwan
- 2009 Winner - Concert Artists Guild International Competition, New York
- 2012 Golden Melody - Best Classical Album, Taiwan

== Discography ==
Chopin

Studio album by Ching-Yun Hu
- Released: April 2011
- Genre: Classical
- Label: Archimusic

An active recording artist, Hu's debut album, Chopin, was named Best Classical Album of the Year by Taiwan’s Golden Melody Award, and recordings released on Naxos/CAG Records and BMOP/sound with Boston Modern Orchestra Project have received critical acclaim. Her Rachmaninoff album on Centaur/Naxos received a five-star review by the U.K.’s Pianist magazine, which called it “essential listening for Rachmaninoff admirers.” Hu's upcoming album, Liszt Metamorphosis, released by PENTATONE, became available worldwide on July 19, 2024.

Chopin (2011)
No.	Title	Length
1.	"Polonaise-Fantasie in A-flat major, Op. 61"
2.	"Rondo in E-flat major, Op. 16"
3.	"Nocturne in E-flat major, Op. 55, No. 2"
4.	"Mazurka in A minor, Op. 59, No. 1"
5.	"Mazurka in A-flat major, Op. 59, No. 2"
6.	"Mazurka in F-sharp minor, Op. 59, No. 3"
7.	"Scherzo No. 4 in E minor, Op. 54"
8.	"Barcarolle in F-sharp major, Op. 60"
9.	"Polonaise in A-flat major, Op. 53, ‘Heroic’"

Works By Granados, Mozart and Ravel (2013)
No.	Title	Length
1.	"Granados - Goyescas, Op. 11: El Amor y la muerte (Balada)"
2.	"Mozart - Piano Sonata No. 18 in D major, K. 576: I. Allegro"
3.	"Mozart - Piano Sonata No. 18 in D major, K. 576: II. Adagio"
4.	"Mozart - Piano Sonata No. 18 in D major, K. 576: III. Allegretto"
5.	"Granados - Danzas españolas, Op. 37: II. Oriental"
6.	"Granados - Danzas españolas, Op. 37: V. Andaluza"
7.	"Ravel - Gaspard de la nuit: I. Ondine"
8.	"Ravel - Gaspard de la nuit: II. Le Gibet"
9.	"Ravel - Gaspard de la nuit: III. Scarbo"

Jeremy Gill: Before the Wresting Tides (2017)
No.	Title	Length
1.	"Before the Wresting Tides"
2.	"Serenada Concertante"
3.	"Notturno Concertante"

Rachmaninoff (2019)
No.	Title	Length
1.	"Études-tableaux, Op. 39: No. 1 in C minor"
2.	"Études-tableaux, Op. 39: No. 2 in A minor"
3.	"Études-tableaux, Op. 39: No. 3 in F-sharp minor"
4.	"Études-tableaux, Op. 39: No. 4 in B minor"
5.	"Études-tableaux, Op. 39: No. 5 in E-flat minor"
6.	"Études-tableaux, Op. 39: No. 6 in A minor"
7.	"Études-tableaux, Op. 39: No. 7 in C minor"
8.	"Études-tableaux, Op. 39: No. 8 in D minor"
9.	"Études-tableaux, Op. 39: No. 9 in D major"
10.	"Vocalise, Op. 34, No. 14 (arr. Zoltán Kocsis)"
11.	"Bach: Violin Partita No. 3 in E major, BWV 1006: I. Prelude (arr. Sergei Rachmaninoff)"
12.	"Lilacs, Op. 21, No. 5 (arr. Sergei Rachmaninoff)"
13.	"Sonata No. 2 in B-flat minor, Op. 36: I. Allegro agitato"
14.	"Sonata No. 2 in B-flat minor, Op. 36: II. Non allegro - Lento"
15.	"Sonata No. 2 in B-flat minor, Op. 36: III. Allegro molto"

Liszt Metamorphosis (2024)
No.	Title	Length
