= C. Curtis-Smith =

American classical composer

Curtis Curtis-Smith (September 9, 1941, Walla Walla, Washington – October 10, 2014, Kalamazoo Michigan), better known as C. Curtis-Smith or C.C. Smith, was a modernist American composer and pianist.

== Education ==
Curtis-Smith was born in Walla Walla, Washington, and received a bachelor's degree from Whitman College, where he studied with John Ringgold and David Burge. He received a Master of Music degree in piano at Northwestern University where he studied with Alan Stout and Guy Mombaerts. He pursued further studies at the University of Illinois with Kenneth Gaburo, the Tanglewood Music Center with Bruno Maderna, and in master classes at the Blossom Music Festival with Pierre Boulez. Curtis-Smith was an adjunct professor then full-time faculty at Western Michigan University from 1965-2012.

== Career ==
In 1972, he pioneered the technique of bowing the piano. Pianist David Burge wrote about the technique, saying "Loose bows made of strands of fishline are woven throughout the piano strings at various places in the instrument ... to give the pianist the possibility of crescendo and diminuendo on a single note or group of notes."

Curtis-Smith performed at Carnegie Hall in 1968, and had several of his compositions performed at Carnegie Hall as well.

In 1968, Curtis-Smith joined the faculty of Western Michigan University in Kalamazoo, Michigan, where he was Artist-in-residence and a part-time instructor of music composition.

In 2001, Curtis-Smith's Twelve Etudes for piano was one of four compositions commissioned by the Van Cliburn Foundation for the Eleventh Van Cliburn International Piano Competition.

== Honors and awards ==
Curtis-Smith received over 100 grants, awards and commissions, including the 1972 Koussevitzky Prize awarded by the Tanglewood Music Center, a 1978 Guggenheim Fellowship, and an award from the American Academy and Institute of Arts and Letters, among others.

== Selected works ==
=== Orchestral works ===
- Concerto for Violin, Piano and Strings (2005) For violin, piano and string orchestra.
- Lux Esto--Ring in the Light (2003) For orchestra (winds in pairs).
- Violin Concerto (1999)
- Anthem for Piano and Strings (1996)
- Second Symphony (African Laughter) (1996)
- Concerto for Left Hand and Orchestra (1990)
- "...Float Wild Birds, Sleeping " (1988–92)
- Celebration (1986)
- Chaconne à son goût (1984)
- Songs and Cantillations (1983)
- The Great American Symphony (GAS!) (1981)
- (Bells) Belle du jour (1975)
- Winter Pieces (1974)

=== Vocal music ===
- O Wondrous Singer! (2008), A setting of portions of Walt Whitman's When Lilacs Last in the Dooryard Bloom'd, for soprano, string quartet and piano. *Tulips (2007), A setting of the Sylvia Plath poem, for soprano, string quartet and piano.
- Gold Are My Flowers (1992) A cantata /melodrama for soprano, baritone, and chamber group.
- The Mystic Trumpeter (1991) A setting of Walt Whitman's poem, for baritone, men's chorus, trumpet and organ.
- Six Theodore Roethke Settings (1989; revised 2008), Settings of poems of Theodore Roethke for soprano and piano.
- The Shimmer of Evil (1989), Settings of seven poems of Theodore Roethke for baritone and chamber ensemble.
- A Civil War Song Cycle (1987), Settings of seven poems of Walt Whitman and Herman Melville for soprano and piano.
- Chansons innocentes (1987, revised 2007), Settings of poems by e.e. cummings, for soprano and piano.
- Comedie (1972), For two sopranos and chamber orchestra.
- Canticum Novum/Desideria (1971), For six sopranos, four tenors and chamber ensemble.
- “Passant. Un. Nous passons. Deux. De notre somme passons. Trois.” (1970), For nineteen voices, chamber ensemble, and electronic sounds.
- “Till Thousands Thee. Lps. A Secular Alleluia Without...” (1969), For six sopranos, two trumpets, and percussion.

=== Chamber music ===
- More African Laughter (2008). In two movements. For two percussionists (vibraphone and marimba).
- Games for Brass (2003). In four movements. For Brass Quintet.
- A Farewell...(Les adieux) (2001). For horn, string quartet, and piano.
- Trio for Violin, Clarinet and Piano (2000)
- Masques d’Afrique (1997). For Organ, Trumpet and Percussion.
- African Laughter (1994). Septet for flute, oboe, clarinet, violin, viola, cello, and piano.
- Second Piano Trio (“The Secret Heart of Sound”) (1992)
- Sextet for Piano and Winds (1991). For piano and woodwind quintet.
- Five Pieces for Piano and Percussion (1988)
- Fantasy Pieces (1987). Five pieces for violin and piano.
- Sardonic Sketches (1986). Five pieces for woodwind quintet.
- Ragmala -- A Garland of Ragas (1983). For guitar and string quartet.
- The Sweetgrass Trio (1982). For piano trio.
- The Barbershop String Quartet (1982, revised 2001) (Third String Quartet)
- Black and Blues (1979). For brass quintet.
- Sundry Dances (1980). Five pieces for winds and brass.
- Plays and Rimes (1979). For brass quintet and piano.
- Tonalities (1978). For clarinet and percussion (one).
- Ensembles/Solos (1977). For chamber ensemble and piano. Composed in the “Five and Seven” temperament (a microtonal temperament).
- Partita (1977). For flute, clarinet, violin, viola, cello, piano and percussion.
- Unisonics (1977). For alto sax and piano.
- Music for Handbells (1977). For 37 handbells played by ten performers.
- Five Sonorous Inventions (1973). For violin and piano.
- A Song of the Degrees (1972). For two pianos and percussion.
- Fanaffair for Fanny (1971). For nine trumpets in three unequal groups and four-channel tape.
- Second String Quartet (1965).
- Sonata for Flute and Piano (1963)

=== Instrumental music ===
- Goldberg Variation (2003). One of a group of 13 variations on Bach's theme.
- Twelve Etudes for Piano (2000). For solo piano.
- Collusions (1998) Co-written with William Bolcom. For solo piano.
- Bagatelles (1989). For guitar.
- More Southpaw Pitching (1985). For piano, left hand.
- Variations on Amazing Grace (1983). For organ.
- The Great American Guitar Solo (GAGS!) (1982)
- For Gatsby (Steinway #81281) (1982). Four movements for piano.
- Masquerades (1978). Seven pieces for organ.
- Three Pieces for Harp (1976)
- Suite in Four Movements (1975). For harpsichord.
- Tristana Variations (1975). For piano.
- Rhapsodies (1973). For piano.

=== Choral works ===
- The Mystic Trumpeter (1991). A setting of Walt Whitman's poem, for baritone, men's chorus, trumpet, and organ.
- Alap -- Raga Kedar (1984). SATB Chorus.
- Beastly Rhymes (1983–84). Thirteen tongue-twisters and limericks for SATB chorus.

== Recordings ==
- Twelve Etudes for Piano / The Great American Symphony (GAS!)
  - Performers: C. Curtis-Smith, piano; Cologne Radio Symphony Orchestra, Dennis Russell Davies, cond.
  - Release Date: April 30, 2002
  - Label: Albany Records
- Merling Trio Performs Works By C.C. Smith
  - Performers: C. Curtis-Smith, Hermann Herder, Bruce Uchimura, Rainer Schumacher, The Merling Trio, Dennis Russell Davies, Stuttgart Wind Quintet
  - Release Date: August 22, 1995
  - Label: Albany Records
- Dlugoszewski/Curtis-Smith: Sonorous Explorations''
  - Compositions: Unisonics and Music for Handbells
  - Performers: Curtis Curtis-Smith, piano; Trent Kynaston, alto saxophone; Patricia Wichman, handbells; Rick Uren, handbells; Betsey Start, handbells; Mickey Shroeder, handbells; Jeff Powell, handbells; Connie Klausmeier, handbells; Larry Hutchinson, handbells; Steven Hesla, handbells; Barbara Brenner, handbells; Cary Belcher, handbells; Curtis Curtis-Smith, Conductor
  - Label: Composers Recordings, Inc./New World Records

- Chihara/Curtis-Smith''
  - Compositions: Masquerades''
  - Performers: William Albright, organ
  - Label: Composers Recordings, Inc./New World Records
