= Evgeny Starodubtsev =

Russian pianist

Evgeny Starodubtsev (born 1981) is a Russian pianist. He studied with Natalia Trull at the Moscow Conservatory.

He was a 2009 laureate of the Honens International Piano Competition, and won the Ciurlionis Competition in Lithuania in 2011.

His recordings include the complete piano sonatas by Scriabin, and "Vingt regards sur l'Enfant Jesus" by Messiaen.
