= Antonio Pompa-Baldi =

Italian-American pianist

- Born: December 1, 1974 (age 50); Foggia, Italy
- Occupation: Pianist
- Instrument: Piano
- Labels: Centaur Records, Steinway & Sons, Harmonia Mundi, Azica Records, Brilliant Classics, TwoPianists
- Website: pompabaldi.com

Antonio Pompa-Baldi (born December 1, 1974) is an Italian-American pianist. The first prize winner in the 1999 Cleveland International Piano Competition and silver medalist of the 2001 Van Cliburn International Piano Competition, Pompa-Baldi has been noted by The New York Times for his "meltingly beautiful" playing. He was also a prizewinner of the 1998 Marguerite Long-Jacques Thibaud Competition. Pompa-Baldi performs internationally as a recitalist, chamber musician, and concerto soloist under such conductors as Hans Graf, Miguel Harth-Bedoya, Theodore Kuchar and Krzysztof Urbański. Pompa-Baldi currently serves as distinguished professor of piano and head of the piano department at the Cleveland Institute of Music.

== Early life and education ==
Pompa-Baldi was born to a non-musical family in Foggia, Italy. When he was about three years old, his parents stumbled upon a television broadcast of a performance of a piano concerto, and Pompa-Baldi, captivated, started "playing on the table". Shortly after, his parents gave him a toy piano, on which he taught himself to play some tunes by ear. He began formal piano lessons at the age of four with Vittorio Sannoner, and at fourteen, won a string of competition awards in Italy. In 1993, Pompa-Baldi graduated from the Umberto Giordano Conservatory of Foggia, and afterwards moved to Napoli, where he began studies with Annamaria Pennella. He also studied for about 18 months with Aldo Ciccolini, and also served as his assistant. Pompa-Baldi also studied with Paul Badura-Skoda, Bruno Canino and Jörg Demus.

== Career ==
In 1998 Pompa-Baldi received the 3rd Prize at the Marguerite Long-Jacques Thibaud Competition in Paris, France. He also received the special prize for the best interpretation of a contemporary work written for the competition ("Tumultes" by Serge Nigg). In 1999 he won the first prize in the Cleveland International Piano Competition, which led to over 450 concert engagements within two years. In 2001 Pompa-Baldi won a silver medal at the 11th Van Cliburn International Piano Competition in 2001 in addition to the special prize for the best performance of a new work ("Three Impromptus" by Lowell Liebermann). He also won the most prize money. His performance of Prokofiev's Piano Concerto No. 3 (Op. 26) with the Fort Worth Symphony Orchestra and James Conlon in the final round was described by Scott Cantrell of The Dallas Morning News as "kinetically dramatic, almost savage in some of its more forceful passages but lovingly caressed in its more lyric moments", while the Pittsburgh Post-Gazette described it as "the most spectacular moment of the week".

Pompa-Baldi has appeared at such venues as Carnegie Hall and Alice Tully Hall in New York, Cleveland's Severance Hall, Paris' Salle Pleyel, Milan's Sala Verdi, Shanghai's Grand Theatre, and Boston's Symphony Hall. He has appeared as soloist with the Houston Symphony, Berliner Symphoniker, Cape Town Philharmonic Orchestra, Pacific Symphony, Orchestre Philharmonique de Radio France, Boston Pops, and Colorado Symphony, among many other orchestras. Among the conductors he has worked with are Theodore Kuchar, Hans Graf, James Conlon, Louis Lane, Keith Lockhart, Krzysztof Urbański, and Miguel Harth-Bedoya.

After moving to the United States, Pompa-Baldi served on the piano faculty of the Oberlin College Conservatory of Music; he now serves as distinguished professor of piano and head of the piano department at the Cleveland Institute of Music. He also serves as honorary guest professor of the China Conservatory of Music, as well as honorary visiting professor of the Shenyang Conservatory of Music, Wenzhou University and Guizhou Normal University. Pompa-Baldi regularly serves on the juries and faculties of prominent international piano competitions and festivals, including the Minnesota International Piano-e-Competition, Cleveland International Piano Competition, Hilton Head International Piano Competition, Lang Lang Shenzhen Futian International Piano Festival, San Jose International Piano Competition, Grieg International Piano Competition, and many others. He continues to maintain a busy performing schedule, regularly touring internationally as a recitalist, concerto soloist, and chamber musician. His performance of Rachmaninoff's Piano Sonata No. 2 (Op. 36), which he performed as part of a recital at Carnegie Hall, was described by The New York Times as "meltingly beautiful".

== Discography ==
Pompa-Baldi has recorded more than 30 CDs for Centaur Records, the Steinway & Sons label, and Brilliant Classics. For Centaur Records, he recorded the entire piano output of Edvard Grieg, the Josef Rheinberger piano sonatas Opp. 47, 99. and 135, a Schumann album, a Rachmaninoff album, and the complete Hummel piano sonatas. He also recorded a Brahms CD for Azica, and is featured on a Harmonia Mundi CD of live performances from the 11th Van Cliburn International Piano Competition. For the Steinway label, he recorded a CD of songs by Francis Poulenc, which he arranged, as well as Edith Piaf, elaborated for piano solo by the Italian composer Roberto Piana. A second Steinway label CD, titled "Napoli", features classic Neapolitan songs in the form of Improvisations elaborated by Roberto Piana. Additionally, for the Steinway label, Pompa-Baldi recorded three piano sonatas of Mozart. Pompa-Baldi is also one of the most prolific recording artists for the Steinway & Sons Spirio catalogue.

== Personal life ==
Pompa-Baldi lives with his wife, pianist Emanuela Friscioni, and their daughter in Cleveland.
