= Giampaolo Stuani =

Giampaolo Stuani, born in 1966 in Castiglione delle Stiviere, Italy, is a skilled pianist. He has won awards and performed with notable orchestras, sharing his music with audiences worldwide.

== Biography ==
Giampaolo Stuani graduated from the Conservatory L. Campiani in Mantua, studying piano under the renowned teacher Nando Salardi. He further honed his skills under the guidance of Bruno Mezzena in 1985 and earned a specialization diploma with highest honors from the Accademia Musicale Pescarese.

== Awards ==
He has achieved great success in various national and international piano competitions, winning first prize in several prestigious events, including the Scottish International in Glasgow, the International Alfredo Casella in Naples, International Rina Sala Gallo in Monza, International Vincenzo Bellini in Caltanisetta and National A. Speranza in Taranto. His impressive record of awards showcases his exceptional talent and skill as a pianist.

He also won various prizes at famous international piano competitions such as Ciani, Busoni, Viotti, Pozzoli (Italy), Bachauer, Kapell, Cleveland (in the United States), Épinal (France), Pretoria (South Africa), Hamamatsu (Giappone).

== Concert activity ==
Giampaolo Stuani has given numerous recitals in Italy: Auditorium Verdi (Milan), Teatro Comunale (Ferrara), Teatro Regio (Parma), Teatro Ponchielli (Cremona), Teatro Golden (Palermo), Teatro Bibiena (Mantua), Teatro delle Palme (Naples), Wigmore Hall (London), and France, Portugal, Czech Republic, Bulgaria, United States of America. He has also been invited to appear as soloist with leading orchestras, including: Baltimore Symphony Orchestra, Utah Symphony Orchestra, Prague Chamber Orchestra, Sofia State Orchestra, Orchestra del Teatro alla Scala of Milan, the EAOSS-Orchestra Sinfonica Siciliana, Orchestra Scarlatti of Naples, Osaka Philharmonic Orchestra, Royal Scottish National Orchestra, Orchestra da Camera di Mantova, Orchestra Sinfonica Nazionale della RAI.

== Recordings ==
Stuani has recorded for renowned labels such as Dynamic, Olympia, Fontec, OnClassical, Grand Piano, see Naxos.
