= Yakov Kasman =

Russian musician (born 1967)

- Born: February 24, 1967 (age 58); Oryol, RSFSR, Soviet Union
- Occupations: Classical pianist, professor of piano

Yakov Kasman (born February 24, 1967) is a Russian American classical pianist, professor of piano, and artist-in-residence at the University of Alabama at Birmingham.

Since his American debut as the silver medalist at the Tenth Van Cliburn International Piano Competition in 1997, Yakov Kasman has performed concerts in the United States, Russia, and Asia, and appeared as a soloist with more than fifty orchestras.

Kasman became an American citizen in 2006.

== Career ==
Kasman has performed piano concertos and recitals at numerous summer festivals including Brevard, the Peninsula, Las Vegas, Lake Placid, Sewanee and the Grand Teton winter festival. Active as a chamber musician, he has collaborated with the Manhattan, Parissi, Charleston, Shanghai, Tokyo and Talich String Quartets. He regularly gives master classes and serves as competition juror.

=== Reference Orchestras ===
Kasman has appeared as soloist with more than fifty orchestras. The list includes:

- the Pacific, Syracuse, Omaha, Oregon, Nashville, Chattanooga, Memphis, Ft. Worth, Alabama, Huntsville and Montgomery Symphonies
- the Athens - Greece State Orchestra
- the Orchestra de Lille in France
- the Orquestra Simfonica de Baleares, Spain
- the Singapore Symphony
- the National Symphony Orchestra of Taiwan
- the Daejeon Philharmonic in Korea
- the Moscow Philharmonia Orchestra
- the Buffalo Philharmonic Orchestra
- the Alabama Symphony Orchestra

== Discography ==
Kasman has 14 CD recordings with Calliope and Harmonia Mundi.
