= Dror Biran =

Israeli musician

Dror Biran (Hebrew: דרור בירן; born 1977) is an Israeli pianist. He is a graduate from the University of Tel Aviv's Rubin Music Academy and the Cleveland Institute of Music, where he earned his doctorate in studies with Paul Schenly. Biran was awarded the second prize at the 1995 Mikolajus Ciurlionis Competition (ex-aequo with Evgeny Samoilov) and the fourth prize at the Cleveland International Piano Competition in 1997. He subsequently won the Pilar Bayona Piano Competition (1998) and the Spring Competition in Tel Aviv (2000). He has performed internationally, both as a soloist and chamber musician. Formerly teaching at Youngstown State University and Case Western Reserve University, Biran currently holds a piano professor position at the University of Cincinnati College Conservatory of Music.
