= Thierry Huillet =

French pianist and composer

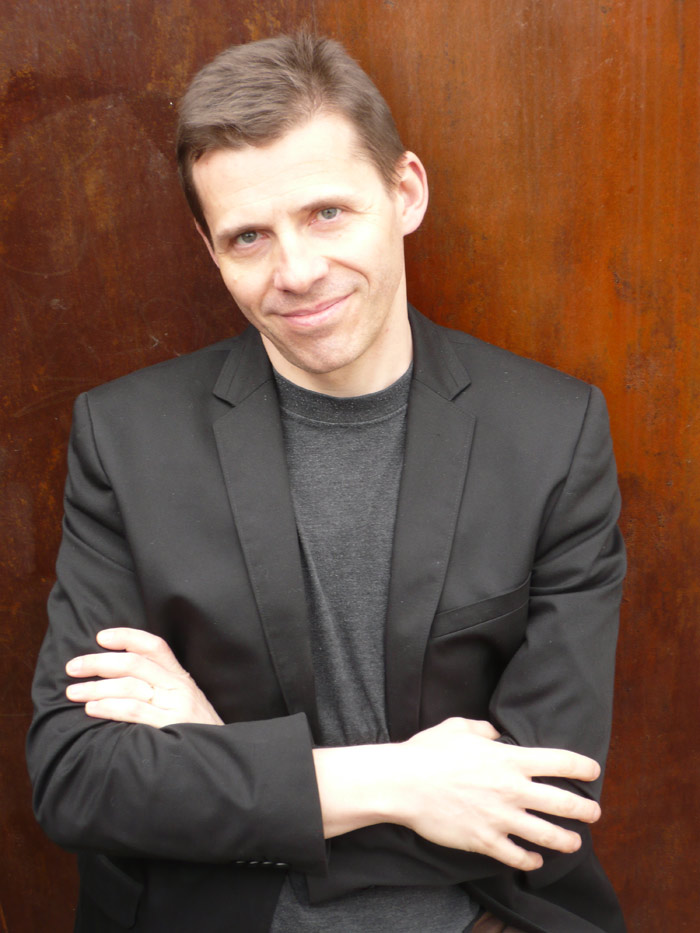
Thierry Huillet

Thierry Huillet (born 21 July 1965) is a French pianist and composer of classical and contemporary classical music.

== As pianist ==
Born in Toulouse, Huillet won first prize at the Conservatoire de Paris where he was a pupil of Pierre Sancan and Germaine Mounier.

In 1987, Huillet won first prize at the Cleveland International Piano Competition. He is also laureate of the Ferruccio Busoni International Piano Competition (Bolzano, Italy, 1986, 1994) et du International Music Competition of Japan (Tokyo, 1989). Il a été invité à jouer dans des salles prestigieuses et avec de nombreux grands orchestres.

A teacher at the Conservatoire à rayonnement régional de Toulouse, he is regularly invited to sit as a jury in major international piano competitions.

He forms a duo with violinist and violist Clara Cernat, his wife.

== As composer ==
Huillet started composing very late. Nevertheless, his work, very lyrical, already contains more than a hundred opus among which concertos (for violin, violin and viola, piano or oboe), chamber music including a concert for piano and violin Le petit prince. He has also produced numerous transcriptions.

His works are created by great artists but also by the "duo Cernat-Huillet" or the "trio Huillet" where the couple is joined by clarinetist Gari Cayuelas-Krasznai.

== Discography ==
  - 1997 - Récital live (Beethoven, Bloch, Brahms, Enesco, Fauré) - (14 janvier, éd. CCTH) (OCLC 44708009)
  - 1997 - Récital : Brahms, Beethoven, Fauré, Enescu, Bloch - Clara Cernat, violin (éd. Lelia Productions / Nuit transfigurée) (OCLC 1041342236)
  - 1998 - Les Révélations de l’ADAMI au MIDEM de Cannes » (Enesco) - éd. ADAMI
  - 1998 - Chausson, Concert, Poème, Paysage, Dédicace - Romanian Radio Chamber Orchestra, Clara Cernat, dir. Ludovic Bacs (février-mars, éd. CCTH - Romanian Radio (OCLC 44708035)
  - 1999 - Rêveur, tzigane et diabolique (Saint-Saëns, Ravel, Liszt, Huillet, Porumbescu, Monti, Sarasate), éd. Mezzanotte/ DVD
  - 1999 - Enesco, Sonatas for violin and piano - Clara Cernat, violin (23-25 octobre, Lelia Productions / La Nuit Transfigurée LNT 340 102)15 (OCLC 257072382),
  - 2001 - Bloch, Pieces for violin and piano - Clara Cernat, violin (10/13 avril, Lelia Productions / La Nuit Transfigurée LNT 340 108)16 (OCLC 692816321)
  - 2003 - Turina, Sanluqueña - Clara Cernat, violin (Le « Choix » de France Musique, « 4 étoiles » Le Monde de la musique…) éd. Lelia Productions
  - 2003 - The European Anthem / L'Hymne Européen - Rhapsody On The European Anthem (Piano Version: Thema & Final) éd. GEMA Waterpipe Records
  - 2006 - Pianiste, Œuvres pour 2 pianos de Sergueï Rachmaninov - Thierry Huillet et Maurizio Baglini - éd. Lelia Productions
  - 2006 - Chamber music by Maurice Ravel - Thierry Huillet, Stéphane Tran Ngoc et Xavier Gagnepain, éd. REM (4 étoiles Le Monde de la Musique)
  - 2006 - Piano Romantique (Liszt, Granados, Guyard) - éd. Apogée
  - 2006 - Poèmes lyriques & Musiques ingénues, works by Jean Clergue and Marcel Dardigna» - (éd. La Nuit Transfigurée)
  - 2006 - Miniatures #2 - Clara Cernat, alto; Ciortea, Marbé, Enacovici, Capoianu, Huillet, Bartók (éd Lelia Productions)
  - 2008 - Kunc, Édition du cinquantenaire (13 février/29 avril, Suoni e colori SC253462) (OCLC 858152876)
  - 2008 - Rêveur, tzigane et diabolique » (Saint-Saëns, Ravel, Liszt, Huillet, Porumbescu, Monti, Sarasate) -( DVD éd. Mezzanotte)
  - 2009 - Intégrale de l’œuvre pour piano solo de Thierry Huillet - Ed. Mezzanotte
  - 2014 - Folies! : contemporary creation and a new transcription - Henry Purcell, Bach, Thierry Huillet -( éd. Ligia Digital)
  - 2015 - Tzigane et diabolique : Saint-Saëns, Ravel, Liszt, Huillet, Cernat, Porumbescu, Monti, Sarasate (éd. Lelia Productions)
  - 2015 - Thierry Huillet, Œuvres pour violon et piano & pour piano seul, Clara Cernat, violin (éd. Lelia Productions)
  - 2015 - Les plus beaux arrangements de la musique classique arr. for violin and piano - Clara Cernat, violon (éd. Lelia Productions)
  - 2016 - 7 fables de La Fontaine - creation inspired by lafontaine's fables Thierry Huillet, piano et Clara Cernat, violin (éd. Lelia Productions)
  - 2017 - Thierry Huillet et le Haïku (Clara Cernat, Damien Ventula, Sandrine Tilly) éd. Lelia productions
  - 2017 - 5 Haïku Papillon - Clara Cernat, violin (éd. Lelia productions )
  - 2018 - Musique pour alto, clarinette et Piano - Clara Cernat, alto; Gari Cayuelas, clarinet; Thierry Huillet, piano (éd. Lelia productions)
  - 2019 - Un Requiem & Prélude pour alto et orchestre de Thierry Huillet - Laura Tatulescu, Sarah Defrise, Clara Cernat, Orchestre de Chambre de Toulouse (France)
  - 2021 - Buenos Aires de Thierry Huillet - Clara Cernat, violin (éd. Lelia Productions)
  - 2021 - Romanian Rhapsodies of Thierry Huillet - Orchestre de Chambre de Toulouse, Clara Cernat violin soloist (éd. Lelia Productions)
