= Joshua Rupley =

American pianist (born 1993)

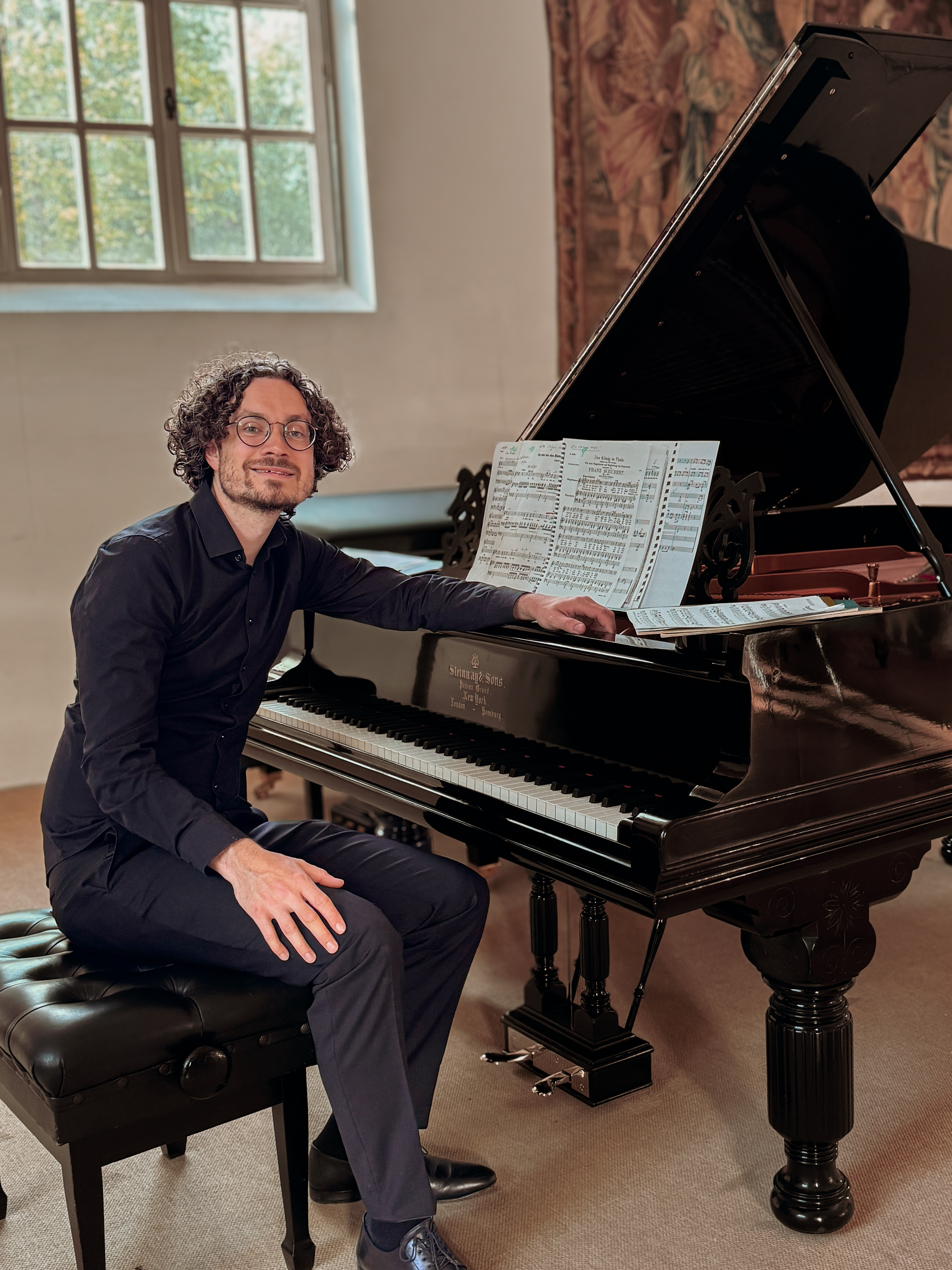
- Joshua Rupley sitting at an 1890 Steinway grand piano in Gut Bannacker, Germany

Background information
- Born: 30 January 1993 (age 33); Albuquerque, New Mexico
- Genres: Classical
- Instrument: Piano
- Label: TYXart
- Website: joshuarupley.com

Joshua Rupley is an American Classical pianist, orchestra conductor, and pedagogue based in Germany.

== Early life and education ==
Rupley was born and raised in Albuquerque, New Mexico. Although not born into a musical family – his mother was a drafter and his father was an architect – his parents gave him a book of manuscript paper for Christmas at age 6, after which he taught himself to notate music. He made his first attempts at composing before he learned to play an instrument. Over time, his interest in orchestra and Classical music in general began to grow. At age 11, he began taking his first piano lessons with Lisa Francis. Homeschooling allowed him great flexibility in his schedule, allowing him to practice piano extensively and pursue other interests, including poetry, language, science, theatre, and politics.

At age 14, he began lessons in piano and composition with New Mexican composer Michael Mauldin, who helped him to attain a performance of one of his compositions for orchestra with the Symphony Orchestra of Albuquerque, a community orchestra with a concert series for youth. Rupley, then 15 years old, conducted the premiere himself. He conducted the orchestra for several years, and began taking conducting lessons with Gabriel Gordon.

Starting at age 16, Rupley began to organize his own piano recitals and was soon invited to join the studio of Falko Steinbach at the University of New Mexico. After graduating from high school, Rupley was the first fine arts student ever to be awarded the prestigious Regents Scholarship of the University of New Mexico, a full-ride scholarship.

== Emigration and work in Germany ==
In 2011, Joshua Rupley attended the Klavierfestival Lindlar for the first time. He fell in love with Germany and returned to New Mexico to study piano performance and German language & literature at the same time. After six months, he had mastered the German language at an academic level und moderated all the concerts of the Klavierfestival Lindlar in 2012. He spent the 2013–2014 academic year as an exchange student at the Würzburg University of Music, after which he transferred enrollment and completed his studies there.

In Würzburg, Rupley initially studied under Bach specialist Inge Rosar, then with Silke-Thora Matthies. He completed one master's degree in piano performance and another in Art song Interpretation under Gerold Huber. In 2025, he graduated with the Meisterklasse Diploma, the German terminal artistic degree, under Silke-Thora Matthies.

Rupley has held a lecturer position in Art Song Interpretation at the Leopold Mozart College of Music of the University of Augsburg since 2021. He collaborates closely with composer C. René Hirschfeld and in 2023 recorded Hirschfeld's cycle Musik für Piano Solo for the TyxArt label. From 2018 to 2020, he co-directed the concert series "Werkstatt Lied München" alongside Gerold Huber. In 2025, he founded the international exchange project "Die Liederreise," bringing a group of young singers and pianists from around the world to Germany for a three-week masterclass.

== Contemporary music ==
Joshua Rupley is particularly active in the performance of 20th-century and contemporary music. He has collaborated with Michael Mauldin, Falko Steinbach, Rory Boyle, Henrik Ajax, C. René Hirschfeld, András Hámary, Karola Obermüller, and Joseph Schwantner. In 2011, Michael Mauldin dedicated the work "The River" to Rupley, and in 2024, C. René Hirschfeld dedicated his four nocturnes to him.

Rupley has worked closely with composer Caspar René Hirschfeld since 2023, when he premiered Hirschfeld's 7-movement cycle "Music for Piano Solo" at the KlangART Vision Festival in Saxony-Anhalt. He released a CD-recording of the work on the TYXart Label in March, 2025.

In June 2025, Rupley gave the world premiere of Caspar René Hirschfeld's 45-minute piano concerto "nacht.wachen" with the Kyiv Symphony Orchestra under the direction of Francesco Cagnasso. The piece describes an air raid, and the performance took place in the historic Hugo Junkers factory of WWII-era bomber aircraft in Dessau, Germany.

== Style and influences ==
Rupley's style and aesthetic is strongly influenced by literature. Authors that had a particular impact on his thinking include Julian of Norwich, Fyodor Dostoevsky, Richard Dehmel, and Joseph von Eichendorff.

== Recordings ==
- CD of German Lieder by Clara Schumann, Arnold Schoenberg and Richard Strauss with Soprano Theresa Romes (2020)
- "Trost" (2021): Lieder by Franz Schubert, Robert Schumann & Hugo Wolf
- First recording of Caspar René Hirschfeld's Musik für Piano Solo (TyxArt, 2025), hailed for its "almost hypnotic grace" and attention to dissonant detail.
- Single of Intermezzo Op. 119 No. 1 by Johannes Brahms (2025)

== Personal life ==
Joshua Rupley lives in Friedberg, Bavaria, with his wife and three sons.
