= Eglė Janulevičiūtė =

Lithuanian pianist

- Born: Kaunas, Lithuania
- Genres: Classical
- Occupation: Pianist
- Instrument: Piano

Eglė Ausra Janulevičiūtė (born in Kaunas) is a Lithuanian classical pianist.

She trained at the Lithuanian Academy of Music. In 1993, she moved to London to attend Guildhall School of Music and Drama and in 1996 moved to the United States. She has master's degree from Bowling Green State University and doctorate from University of California, Santa Barbara. She is an adjunct professor at Westmont College.

Competition record
1986	(Soviet Union) Mikolajus Ciurlionis iRPC	Diploma
1989	(United States) Robert Casadesus IPC	6th Prize
1991	(United States) Young Keyboard Artists Association IPC	1st Prize
