= Eglė Rakauskaitė =

Lithuanian artist (born 1967)

Egle Rake
- Born: Eglė Rakauskaitė; 1967 (age 58–59); Vilnius, Lithuanian SSR
- Education: Vilnius Academy of Arts

Eglė Rakauskaitė, currently better known as Egle Rake, is a Lithuanian visual artist. She belongs to the first generation of contemporary artists who came onto the Lithuanian art scene around the re-establishment of the country's independence in 1990 and is now recognised to be among the most notable Lithuanian artists to have emerged during the 90s.

== Early years (1993–1998) ==
=== Object art ===
Rakauskaitė was born in 1967 in Vilnius. She graduated from the painting department of the Vilnius Academy of Arts in 1993. For a couple of years after graduation she participated in the emerging Lithuanian fashion scene, experimenting with the incorporation of non-traditional materials and humorous associations in designs which were intended to shock the public.

The first works which Rake exhibited in a visual art context were related to her experience of the fashion world. These include For Virginia (1994), a dress made of dried jasmine petals sewn together, and Hairy (1994), an all-over suit knitted from synthetic fabric which has the appearance of curly dark hair, and which covered the whole body, leaving only apertures the eyes, nose and mouth, as well as those areas where hair is "legitimate" on a woman—the head and the crotch.

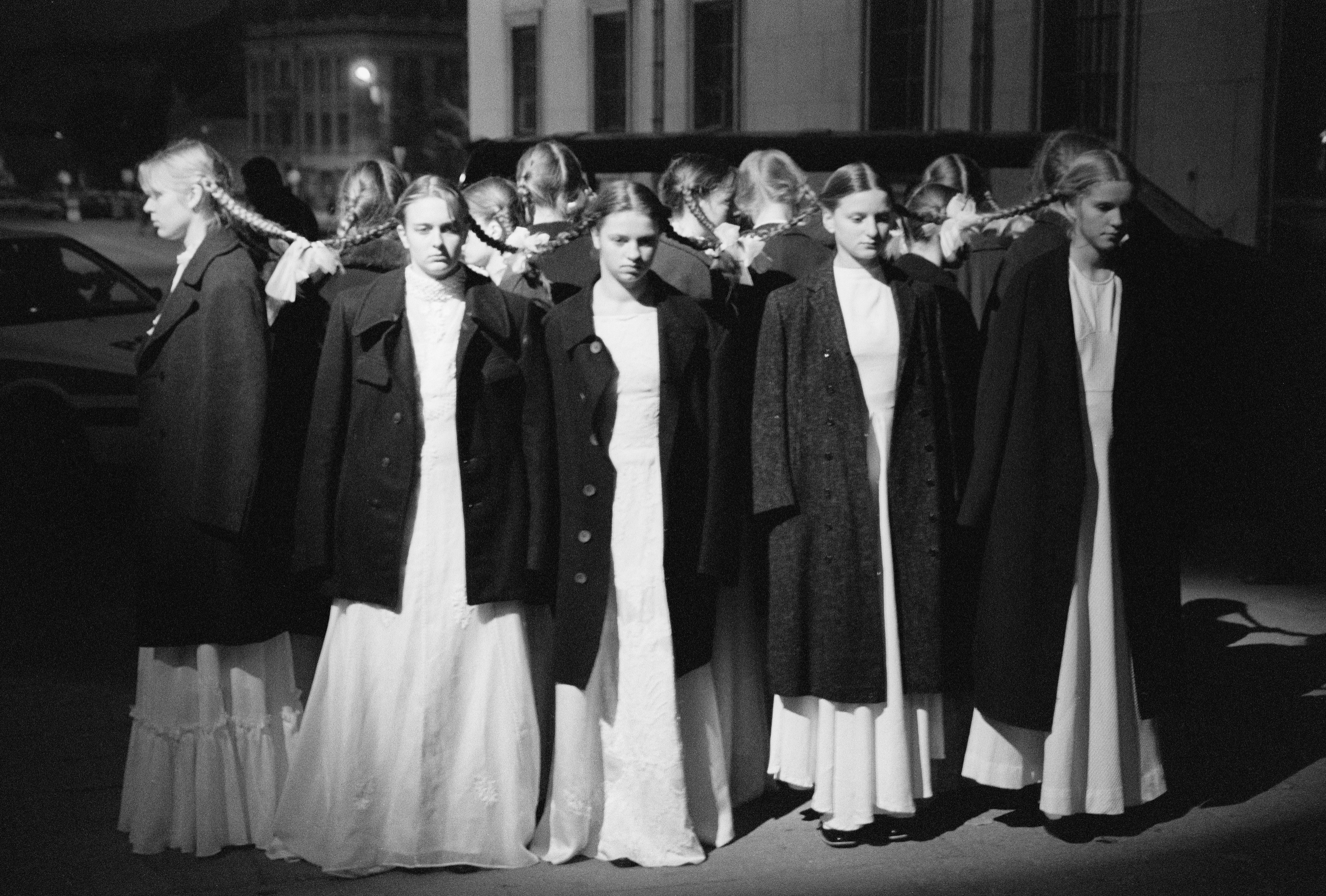
Eglė Rakauskaitė - For Guilty without Guilt. Trap. Expulsion from Paradise, 1995

In a further number of works, hair continued to be explored as a material. In 1995, Rake participated in the Soros Centre for Contemporary Arts exhibition Mundane Language, where works were created specifically for various non-gallery locations throughout the city of Vilnius, with a two-part work, For Guilty Without Guilt. The first part, Net, was a net woven out of women's natural hair and stretched out high between two buildings in the former Vilnius Jewish ghetto. The second part, entitled Trap. Expulsion from Paradise, was a live sculpture in which Rake formed another net by attaching the braids of thirteen adolescent girls. This work has been called "the logo of 1990s' Lithuanian art" and has thereafter been shown on a number of occasions: in 1996 at Zachęta Gallery in Warsaw (exhibition Personal Time); in 1997 at the 5th Istanbul Biennial; in 1999 in Stockholm for the exhibition After the Wall. Art and Culture in Post-Communist Europe; in 2009 in Vienna (exhibition Gender Check. Femininity and Masculinity in the Art of Eastern Europe); and in 2012 in Zagreb, in an exhibition which formed part of the project re.act.feminism.

Along with flower petals and hair, Rake has explored a number of other organic, perishable materials in the art of her early period, including honey, animal fat and chocolate. Chocolate Crucifixes (1995) was another landmark work; a sculpture composed of chocolate crucifix figurines each 42 cm high, fixed onto the wall to form a decorative pattern. First shown in Lithuania with just 42 crucifixes (exhibition New Works at the Vilnius Contemporary Art Centre (CAC)), the work was increased to a heroic scale with 1090 pieces in 2000 when it was shown in the exhibition L'autre moitié de l'Europe at the Galerie Nationale du Jeu de Paume in Paris.

=== Body art and performance ===
With In Honey (1996) the artist's body was incorporated within the work for the first time, and it is also one her first uses of the video medium. Categorised as a videoperformance, the work has been presented as the video documentation of a performance in which the artist lay in a sort of hammock half-immersed in honey (due to the density of honey the human body floats in it) breathing through a tube.

From In Honey followed on In Fat (1998), another videoperformance. For this work, Rake lay fully immersed in a glass tank filled with melted lard, again breathing through a tube, until the fat cooled down and solidified. The work was presented in an installation where three aligned television monitors, each showing a third of the artist's body and together forming a nearly life-size image, are fitted in blankly dark premises, raised on a platform with their backs turned to the spectator; in front of the screens a pane of shop-window glass is hung obliquely, so that the view from the screens is reflected in the glass. The final video is twenty-minutes long, during which small movements of the body, most notably a hand, are perceptible while the fat gradually becomes lighter in colour and increasingly more opaque.

== Later years (1998–2003) ==
=== Video art and installation ===
Towards the end of the 1990s a notable shift in Rake's art is perceptible as she turns her sight from the exploration of unconventional materials and her own body as a medium to the observation of her social context. At the same time, video becomes her main form of expression. In 1998 she participated in the Vilnius Contemporary Art Centre's (CAC) exhibition Twilight, the first in Lithuania dedicated entirely to the "new technologies" penetrating art, with the work Sorrowful, an installation consisting of a TV monitor placed in an object which resembles a Lithuanian wayside shrine; the video in the monitor shows a man imitating the usual pose of a pensive Christ as he is usually represented in the aforementioned shrines.

Faces was also shown for the first time in 1998 and continued as a project during a few years thereafter. A synchronised two-channel video installation, it shows the faces of various people Rake encountered in professional and personal situations during that period. Two screens are placed on top of each other, a portrait of a person looking at the camera at the camera appears in the top screen, then "drops" or "melts" into the bottom screen where he or she is seen with eyes closed, while a new face emerges above.

Also developed over the years between 1998 and 2003, the work Street Musicians shows street performers filmed in various countries during the artist's travels, and is displayed as an installation with a variable number of monitors scattered around the room, suspended from the ceiling.

During her residency at the Out North Contemporary Art House in Anchorage, Alaska in 2001, she began the project Another Breathing. She interviewed six elders form the Pioneers' Home in Anchorage about their thoughts on life and death; the project was later extended by interviewing seniors in Lithuania, Russia, Austria and Italy. The work was later displayed on five monitors which simultaneously showed the interview footage from the five countries.

My America (2003) is a twelve-minute video which presents, in documentary style, a fragment of daily routine of illegal immigrant care workers in the United States, filmed when Rake took up such a job herself during a stay in the US.

=== Photography ===
The Homeless of Vilnius (2000) is a series of sixteen black and white large-scale (95x70 cm) photographic prints, which depict the homeless people Rake used to meet most often on the streets of Vilnius. Photographed against a plain grey background (in a studio which was set up in the street for the purpose), these people are seen in all their individuality, rather than determined by their usual context.

== Recent years (2004–present) ==
In 2004, Rake's solo exhibition My Address is neither a House nor a Street, My Address is a Shopping Center, which was one of the exhibitions in the cycle Emission 2004 at the CAC, marked another shift in the artist's oeuvre; video and audio works here were recordings of enacted or suggested interventions into the routine proceedings of everyday life.

The same proactive attitude marks a painting series produced in 2011—these works could be read as abstract compositions alluding to Kazimir Malevich's Black Square of 1915, their colouring guided by Wassily Kandinsky's colour theory. They also function, however, as QR codes which can be scanned with a smartphone or tablet device, revealing the work's title or an Internet link to another image or video clip. The encoded content in many cases referred in an ironic tone, to various social, political and economic topical issues.

== Awards and residencies ==
2003

- State Grant of the Lithuanian Ministry of Culture

2000

- ArtsLink residency, Out North Contemporary Art House, Anchorage, Alaska

1998

- Akademie Schloss Solitude, Stuttgart, Germany
- ArtsLink residency, The Fabric Workshop and Museum, Philadelphia

1997

- Civitella Ranieri Center, Umbertide PG, Italy
- State Grant of the Lithuanian Ministry of Culture

== 48th International Venice Biennale ==
In 1999, Lithuania participated for the first time in the Venice Biennale. Eglė Rakauskaitė was chosen as Lithuania's representative (her works In Honey and Faces were exhibited) along with sculptor Mindaugas Navakas.

== Selected solo exhibitions ==
- 2004 My Address is neither a House nor a Street, My Address is a Shopping Centre, Contemporary Art Centre (CAC), Vilnius
- 2004 In My Own Juice, Tallinn Art Hall, Tallinn
- 2003 My Life to Live, National Centre for Contemporary Arts, Moscow
- 2002 XL Gallery, Moscow
- 2000 New Works, CAC, Vilnius

== Selected group exhibitions ==
- 2013 re.act.feminism #2 – a performing archive (2011 –2013), Akademie der Künste, Berlin
- 2013 Part of a Larger Whole. Lithuanian Contemporary Art, CAC, Vilnius
- 2012 re.act.feminism #2 – a performing archive (2011 –2013), Galerija Miroslav Kraljev, Zagreb
- 2011 Where Do We Migrate To?, Center for Art Design and Visual Culture, University of Maryland, Baltimore
- 2010 Lithuanian Art 2000–2010: Ten Years, CAC, Vilnius
- 2009 Gender Check. Feminity and Masculinity in the Art of Eastern Europe, mumok (Museum Moderner Kunst), Vienna
- 2009 Transitland: Video Art from Central and Eastern Europe 1989–2009, Rensselaer Polytechnic Institute, Troy
- 2004 New Video, New Europe: A Survey of Eastern European Video, The Renaissance Society, Chicago; Contemporary Art Museum, St.Louis; Tate Modern, London
- 2004 Faster than History, Kiasma, Helsinki
- 2000 L'autre moitié de l'Europe, Galerie Nationale du Jeu de Paume, Paris
- 1999 After the Wall: Art and Culture in Post-Communist Europe, Moderna Museet, Stockholm; Lugwig Museum, Budapest; Hamburger Bahnhof, Berlin
