= Élisabeth Pion =

Canadian classical pianist

- Born: March 25, 1996 (age 30); Saint-Hyacinthe, Quebec, Canada
- Genre: contemporary
- Years active: 2018–present
- Label: ATMA Classique
- Website: www.elisabethpiano.com

Élisabeth Pion is a Canadian classical pianist based in London. In October 2025, she earned the Gold Laureate prize and Audience Choice Award at the 2025 Honens International Piano Competition.

She was the pianist with the De Beauvoir Piano Trio for three years and is co-founder and co-artistic director of the Festival Unisson in Montreal. Her albums are released on the ATMA Classique label.

== Early life and education ==
Born March 25, 1996 in Saint-Hyacinthe, Quebec, and raised in Otterburn Park, in Montérégie, Pion began playing the piano at age five, studying with pianist Francine Lacroix.

She earned a baccalaureate and Prix avec Grande Distinction at the Conservatoire de Musique de Montréal, studying with Suzanne Goyette and André Laplante. She also studied at the Accademia di Musica with Enrico Pace in Pinerolo, Italy.

She then moved to London for advanced training at Guildhall School of Music and Drama where she studied with Ronan O'Hora and earned both the Artist Masters and Artist Diploma with highest honors. She also won the 2021 Guildhall Wigmore Recital Prize.

Her other teachers and mentors included Imogen Cooper, Benedetto Lupo, and Ricardo Castro.

In 2018 the CBC named Pion one of its "30 Hot Canadian Classical Musicians Under 30" and La Scena Musicale one of its "15 Rising Stars."

== Performance career ==
In 2019 Pion made her BBC Radio 3 broadcast debut and in 2021 her Wigmore Hall solo recital debut. From 2020–2023 she was the pianist for the De Beauvoir Piano Trio.

In 2022–23 she made her U.S. concerto debut with the Toledo Symphony Orchestra, performed with the orchestra of the Brott Music Festival, and presented a solo recital at St John's Smith Square (Smith Square Hall) in London. In 2024 she won the Silver Medal at the Blanca Uribe Colombia International Piano Competition. In 2026 Pion made her live "In Tune" debut on BBC Radio 3.

With cellist Agnès Langlois, Pion is co-founder and co-artistic director of the Festival Unisson, a festival inspired by performance artist Marina Abramovic (The Artist Is Present) and the 1:1 Concerts in Germany. Pion teaches Tai Chi workshops to audiences and orchestras.

== Recording career ==
In 2023 ATMA Classique released Pion's debut album, Femmes de Légende, with music by French composers, along with music by Thomas Adès and by Pion herself.

Her 2024 ATMA Classique album Amadeus et l’Impératrice: Montgeroult | Mozart with the Arion Orchestre Baroque and Mathieu Lussier, on which she played an 1826 Broadwood fortepiano, was a finalist for the Prix Opus Album of the Year award.

In June 2026 ATMA Classique released Ravel: Le Tombeau de Couperin and Concertante Works featuring Pion and harpist Valerie Milot with Alain Trudel and the Trois Rivières Symphony Orchestra.

== Notable performances ==
- Recital at Mannes Summer Piano Festival (2025)
- Orchestre Métropolitain – Dukas, Garūta (2024)
- Recital at Festival Classica, Saint-Lambert (2023)
- Recital at Carnegie Hall Weill Recital Hall with Alexandra Pouta (2022)
- Recital debut at Wigmore Hall (2021)

== Prizes and distinctions ==
Year	Prize or distinction
2025	Honens International Piano Competition, Gold Laureate and Audience Choice Award (2025)
2024	Révélations Radio-Canada 2024-25
2024	Pierre-Mantha Award from the Fondation Père-Lindsay
2024	Silver Medal, Blanca Uribe Colombia International Piano Competition
2022	Jeunesses Musicales Choquette-Symcox Prize for Artistic Excellence
2018	Shean Piano Competition (2018)

== Discography ==
- 2026: Ravel: Le Tombeau de Couperin and Concertante Works with harpist Valerie Milot and Alain Trudel and the Trois Rivières Symphony Orchestra (ATMA Classique)
- 2024: Amadeus et l’Impératrice : Montgeroult | Mozart with the Arion Orchestre Baroque and Mathieu Lussier (ATMA Classique)
- 2023: Femmes de Légende (ATMA Classique)
