= Eglė Karpavičiūtė =

Lithuanian painter

Eglė Karpavičiūtė (born 1984) is a Lithuanian painter.

== Awards ==
- 2015: Donkey Art Prize, Milan, Italy
- 2015: Premio Combat Prize, Livorno, Italy

== Shows ==
- 2010: Science Fiction. Retrospective, Old Town art gallery/studio, Vilnius
- 2012: Imagoscopia, Pramantha Arte, Lamezia Terme, Italy
