= Vassily Primakov =

Russian concert pianist

Vassily Primakov Василий Примаков
- Born: Moscow
- Genre: Classical music
- Occupation: Pianist
- Instrument: Piano
- Label: Bridge Records
- Website: vassilyprimakov.com

Vassily Primakov (Russian: Василий Примаков) is a Russian concert pianist and recording artist known for his interpretations of Chopin.

== Education ==
Primakov was born in Moscow and began studies at Moscow's Central Special Music School at age eleven as a pupil of Vera Gornostayeva. He then attended the Music Academy of the West in Montecito and the Juilliard School in New York, where he studied under Jerome Lowenthal.

== Performing career ==
In 1999, Primakov won second prize at the Cleveland International Piano Competition, and in 2001 he was a semi-finalist in the Van Cliburn Competition. Upon hearing Primakov's performance of “La Valse” at the competition, Van Cliburn himself said “Prodigious technique, really wonderful,” with a “look of sheer rapture on his face.” Primakov then won both the silver medal and Audience Prize at the 2002 Gina Bachauer International Piano Competition.

In 2007, he was honored by the Classical Recording Foundation with their Young Artist of the Year Award. His disc of 21 Mazurkas by Chopin was named a "Best of Year" by National Public Radio (2009).

In 2011, along with his duo partner Natalia Lavrova, Primakov launched a new Record Label LP Classics Home Their first release was Arensky's Suites for Two Pianos, as well as first volume of Live Performances of his former teacher Soviet pianist Vera Gornostayeva.

== Discography ==
- Frédéric Chopin: Solo Piano Works (2004, Tavros)
- Beethoven: Sonatas Opp. 57 "Appassionata", 14/1, 111 (2008, Bridge)
- Chopin: Piano Concertos Nos. 1 & 2 (2008, Bridge)
- Chopin: 21 Mazurkas (2009, Bridge)
- Tchaikovsky: Grand Sonata, Op. 37; "The Seasons" Op. 37b (2009, Bridge)
- Schumann: Kreisleriana; Carnaval; Arabeske (2009, Bridge)
- Dvořák: Piano Concerto, Op. 33; Poetic Tone Pictures, Op. 85 (2009, Bridge)
- Schubert: 26 Waltzes; 13 Laendler, 4 Impromptus, Op. 90; Impromptus Nos 1 & 2, Op. 142 (2010, Bridge)
- Brahms: 3 Intermezzos, Op. 117; Chopin: Four Ballades; Scriabin: Sonata No. 4 (DVD, 2010, Bridge)
- Mozart: Piano Concertos: No. 24, K. 491; No. 25, K. 503; No. 26, K. 537; No. 27, K. 595 (2010, Bridge) (2-CD set)
- "Primakov in Concert, Vol. 1" Brahms, Schubert, Tchaikovsky, Rachmaninoff; (2010, Bridge)
- Poul Ruders: Piano Concerto No. 2 (Norwegian Radio Orchestra, Sondergard) (2011, Bridge)
- Mozart Piano Concertos: No. 11, K. 413; No. 20, K. 466; No. 21, K. 467 (Odense SO, Gaudenz) (2011, Bridge)
- Rachmaninoff Recital: Preludes and Elegie from op.3, 23 & 32; Corelli Variations op.42 (2011, Bridge)
- Arlene Sierra: "Birds and Insects, Book 1"; (2011, Bridge)
- "Primakov in Concert, Vol. 2" Mendelssohn, J.S. Bach, P. Glass, Debussy (2011, Bridge)
- Mozart. Piano Concertos: No.17, K.453; No.22, K.482; (2012, Bridge)
- Arensky. Suites for Two Pianos; Lavrova/Primakov Piano Duo (2011, LP Classics)
- Vassily Primakov: Live in Concert. Works by Medtner, Schumann, Brahms and Ravel (2012, LP Classics)
- Chopin: 3 Sonatas; 4 Ballades; 4 Scherzos; (2013, LP Classics)
- F. Ries. Piano Sonatas and Sonatina for One Piano, Four Hands. Susan Kagan, and Vassily Primakov (Naxos, 2013)
- Live from the Gina Bachauer International Piano Festival: Lavrova/ Primakov Piano Duo. Works by Scriabin, Brahms, Busoni and Liszt (LP Classics, 2014)
- Rachmaninoff. Symphonic Dances; Suites for Two Pianos. Lavrova/ Primakov Piano Duo (LP Classics, 2014)
- Braam van Eeden. Piano Sonatas. Natalia Lavrova and Vassily Primakov, piano ( LP Classics, 2014)
- Grand Duo. Weber & Mendelssohn. Alexey Gorokholinsky, Clarinet; Vassily Primakov, Piano (LP Classics, 2014)
- Chopin and Rachmaninoff Cello Sonatas. Ben Capps, Cello Vassily Primakov, Piano (LP Classics, 2015)
- Chopin. 51 Mazurkas (LP Classics,2015)

MusicWeb-International called his recording of Chopin's Piano Concertos “one of the great Chopin recordings of recent times." Primakov's interpretations of the two Chopin piano concertos combine grace and fire in the service of unflagging intensity. These are performances of extraordinary power and beauty.” And Gramophone wrote “Primakov's empathy with Chopin's spirit could hardly be more complete.” Regarding his CD of Chopin Mazurkas, Fanfare wrote “Primakov has made a Chopin recording everyone should hear.”
