= Maxim Philippov =

Russian pianist

- Born: 1972 (age 53–54); Moscow
- Known for: Pianist

Maxim Philippov (born 1972) is a Russian pianist. Born in Moscow, Philippov began the study of piano at five and made his public debut at eight. He won a silver medal at the Van Cliburn International Piano Competition in 2001, in addition to the Steven De Groote Memorial Award for the best performance of chamber music; other prizes include fifth prize at the Arthur Rubinstein International Piano Master Competition in 1992, First Laureate of the Honens International Piano Competition in 1996, and Fifth Prize in the Leeds International Piano Competition in 1993, among other prizes at various competitions, including the International Tchaikovsky Competition. He is currently on the faculty of the Moscow Conservatory.
