= Pascal Zavaro =

French composer (born 1959)

Pascal Zavaro (born 3 October 1959) is a French composer.

== Life ==
Zavaro studied at the Conservatoire de Paris.

In his music, rhythmic thinking is predominant. The sources are very broad, from rock, Bartók, Stravinsky or some scores of Steve Reich, resulting in a very personal and innovative expression.

== Main works ==
- Stratus, for large orchestra,
- Flashes, for large orchestra,
- The Meeting, for large orchestra,
- Alia, for orchestra,
- Concerto, for cello and orchestra,
- Silicon Music, concerto for electric violin and ensemble,
- Tag, for string quartet,
- Remiix, for string quartet,
- La Grève, for clarinet, bass clarinet, percussion, piano and string quintet (music for the eponymous film by Sergei Eisenstein),
- Trois Danses en sextuor, for clarinet, piano and string quartet,
- Three Studies for a Crucufixion, for orchestra,
- Densha Otoko, for piano trio,
