= Stanislav Khristenko =

Ukrainian pianist

- Born: May 25, 1984 (age 42); Kharkiv, Ukraine (formerly: USSR)
- Genre: Classical
- Occupation: Pianist
- Instrument: Piano
- Website: khristenko.com

Stanislav Khristenko (Ukrainian: Станiслав Христенко; born May 25, 1984, in Kharkiv, Ukraine) is a Ukrainian-American concert pianist.

== Life ==
Stanislav Khristenko was born in Kharkiv, Ukraine into a Ukrainian-Jewish family and started taking piano lessons at the age of 7. He got his professional training at Moscow Tchaikovsky Conservatory and Cleveland Institute of Music.

== Career ==
In 2010, Khristenko made his Vienna Konzerthaus debut and released his Ernest Krenek Works CD on Oehms Classics.

In 2013, Khristenko won the Maria Canals International Music Competition, Cleveland Piano Competition, and Fourth prize at the Queen Elisabeth Piano Competition.

In 2014, Khristenko made his debut in Zankel Hall at Carnegie Hall and released his album Fantasies on the Steinway recording label.

In February 2015, Khristenko was officially added to the roster of Steinway Artists. In the summer of 2015, he also debuted at the Ravinia Festival and released the first volume of his recording of Ernst Krenek's piano works on Toccata Classics

== Recordings ==
- 2020 – Toccata Classics – Ernst Krenek: Piano Music Volume Two
- 2015 – Toccata Classics – Ernst Krenek: Piano Music Volume One
- 2014 – Steinway & Sons Label – Fantasies
- 2013 – Queen Elisabeth Competition Winners CD
- 2012 – Oehms Classics – Ernst Krenek Piano Works

== Awards ==
2013

- Cleveland International Piano Competition (USA, I prize)
- Queen Elizabeth Competition (Belgium, IV prize)
- Maria Canals International Music Competition (Spain, I prize)

2012

- Parnassos International Piano Competition (Mexico, I prize)
- UNISA International Piano Competition (South Africa, III prize)

2011

- V Campillos International Piano Competition (Spain, I prize)
- Almaty International Piano Competition (Kazakhstan, I prize)

2010

- "Citta di Cantu" International Competition for Piano and Orchestra (Italy, I prize & Grand Prix)
- Jose Iturbi International Piano Competition (Los Angeles, CA, USA, I prize)

2009

- Bosendorfer International Piano Competition (Tempe, AZ, I prize)
- Virginia Waring International Piano Competition (Palm Desert, CA, I & II prizes)

2008

- Isang Yun International Piano Competition (South Korea, II prize)
- Wideman International Piano Competition (Shreveport, LA, USA, I prize)

2007

- 1st International Gaidamovich Chamber Music Competition (Russia, I prize)
- International Rubinstein Chamber Music Competition (Russia, II prize)

2006

- Mauro Paolo Monopoli Prize International Piano Competition (Italy, I prize)
- Takamatsu International Piano Competition (Japan, II prize )
- "Benedetto XIII prize" International Piano Competition (Italy, I prize)

2005

- Cleveland International Piano Competition (USA, III prize)
- Pausylipon Prize International Piano Competition (Italy, I prize )

2004

- Dimitrios Vikelas International Piano Competition (Greece, I prize)

1999

- Kosice International Piano Competition (Slovakia, I prize)

1998

- Ettlingen International Piano Competition for young pianists (Germany, IV prize)
