= Amir Katz =

Israeli musician

Amir Katz (Hebrew: אמיר כץ; born 1973 in Ramat Gan) is an Israeli German pianist. He began to play the piano at the age of 11 and won his first national competitions in Israel four years later. He received scholarships to study in Europe, including at the International Piano Foundation at Lake Como, where he had lessons with Leon Fleisher, Karl Ulrich Schnabel and Murray Perahia. These led him to Munich, Germany, where he finished his studies with Elisso Wirssaladse and Michael Schäfer.

Amir Katz has played all over the world, including at Alice Tully Hall in New York, at the Théâtre du Châtelet in Paris, at the Tonhalle in Zürich, and in concert in Japan and China. Among the orchestras he has worked with are the Munich Philharmonic and the Israel Philharmonic, conducted by Zubin Mehta.
