= Fourteenth Van Cliburn International Piano Competition =

The Fourteenth Van Cliburn International Piano Competition took place in Fort Worth, Texas from May 24 to June 9, 2013. It was won by Ukrainian pianist Vadym Kholodenko.

== Jury ==
- (United States) John Giordano (chairman)
- (Russia) Dmitri Alexeev
- (France) Michel Beroff
- (Italy) Andrea Bonatta
- (United States) Richard Dyer
- (Israel) Joseph Kalichstein
- (Israel) Yoheved Kaplinsky
- (China) Liu Shih Kun
- (Japan) Minoru Kojima
- (United States) Menahem Pressler
- (Colombia) Blanca Uribe
- (Israel) Arie Vardi
- (China) Xian Zhang

== Awards ==
Prize	Winner	Prize money	Other
Gold Medal	(Ukraine) Vadym Kholodenko	$50,000	Career management, 3-year USA concert tour, Harmonia Mundi in-competition recording
Silver Medal	(Italy) Beatrice Rana	$20,000	Career management, 3-year USA concert tour, Harmonia Mundi in-competition recording
Crystal Medal	(United States) Sean Chen	$20,000	Career management, 3-year USA concert tour, Harmonia Mundi in-competition recording
Steven de Groote Memorial Award	(Ukraine) Vadym Kholodenko	$6,000	
Beverley Taylor Smith Award	(Ukraine) Vadym Kholodenko	$5,000	
John Giordano Discretionary Award	(United States) Steven Lin	$4,000	
Raymond E. Buck Discretionary Award	(Italy) Alessandro Deljavan	$4,000	
Jury Discretionary Award	(United States) Claire Huangci	$4,000	
Audience Award	(Italy) Beatrice Rana	$2,500	

- Finalists were awarded $10,000 and a 3-season concert tour and management, semifinalists $5,000 and preliminary competitors $1,000.

== Results ==
N	Competitor	P	S	F
(Russia)	Abrosimov, Nikita			
(Italy)	Buratto, Luca			
(United States)	Chen, Sean			3rd
(Russia)	Chernov, Aleksei			
(United States)	Daneshpour, Sara		o/c	o/c
(Italy)	Deljavan, Alessandro			o/c
(China)	Dong, Fei-Fei			
(France)	Dumont, François		o/c	o/c
(Russia)	Favorin, Yury		o/c	o/c
(United States)	Garritson, Lindsay		o/c	o/c
(Australia)	Gillham, Jayson			o/c
(Italy)	Greco, Giuseppe		o/c	o/c
(China)	Huang, Ruoyu		o/c	o/c
(United States)	Huangci, Claire			o/c
(Ukraine)	Kholodenko, Vadym			1st
(Russia)	Nikolay Khozyainov			o/c
(Poland)	Koziak, Marcin		o/c	o/c
(United States)	Lin, Steven		o/c	o/c
(Taiwan)	Lin, Kuan-Ting		o/c	o/c
(United States)	McDonald, Alex		o/c	o/c
(Chile)	Miranda, Gustavo		o/c	o/c
(Russia)	Mndoyants, Nikita			
(Ukraine)	Poliykov, Oleksandr		o/c	o/c
(Italy)	Rana, Beatrice			2nd
(Japan)	Sakata, Tomoki			
(Italy)	Sangiovanni, Scipione		o/c	o/c
(South Korea)	Sunwoo, Yekwon		o/c	o/c
(Italy)	Taverna, Alessandro		o/c	o/c
(China)	Yuan, Jie		o/c	o/c
(United States)	Zuber, Eric		o/c	o/c
