= Thirteenth Van Cliburn International Piano Competition =

Piano competition (2009)

The Thirteenth Van Cliburn International Piano Competition took place in Fort Worth, Texas from May 22 to June 7, 2009. The competitors were selected by a screening jury during screening auditions that took place in January and February 2009. The Takács Quartet performed with the semifinalists, while the Fort Worth Symphony Orchestra conducted by James Conlon accompanied the finalists.

At the suggestion of composer John Corigliano, a 25-member nominating committee of distinguished musicians issued invitations to noted American composers to submit solo piano scores 8 to 12 minutes in length. Original works by American composers John Musto, Mason Bates, and Daron Hagen were chosen.

Competitors can meet Van Cliburn, a famous American pianist, who came in first place at the Tchaikovsky competition that took place in Moscow, Russia.

The Van Cliburn International Piano Competition is a quadrennial competition hosted by the Van Cliburn Foundation. The first competition took place September 24-October 7, 1962 in Fort Worth, Texas.

== Jury ==
(* denotes members of screening audition jury)

- (United States) *John Giordano (chairman), Corpus Christi Symphony Orchestra music director
- (Italy) *Marcello Abbado, concert pianist and composer
- (Russia) Dimitri Alexeev, pianist
- (France) Michel Béroff, pianist and conductor
- (Taiwan) *Hung-Kuan Chen, pianist
- (United States) *Richard Dyer, classical music writer
- (United States) Joseph Kalichstein, pianist
- (United States) *Yoheved Kaplinsky, pianist and professor of piano
- (Germany) Jürgen Meyer-Josten, pianist and radio executive
- (United States) Menahem Pressler, pianist and professor of music
- (Poland) Tadeusz Strugała, conductor and professor of music

== Awards ==
| Award | Winner(s) | Benefits |
|---|---|---|
| First Prize (Nancy Lee and Perry R. Bass Gold Medal) | (China) Haochen Zhang (Japan) Nobuyuki Tsujii (tie) | cash award of US $20,000 each International concert tours and career management for the three concert seasons following the competition compact disc recording on the harmonia mundi usa label contribution towards domestic and international air travel on American Airlines during the three-year concert tours performance attire provided by Neiman Marcus silver trophy cup |
| Second Prize (Silver Medal) | (South Korea) Yeol Eum Son | cash award of US $20,000; U.S. concert tours and career management for the three concert seasons following the competition compact disc recording on the harmonia mundi usa label |
| Third Prize (Crystal Award) | not awarded | |
| Steven De Groote Memorial Award for the Best Performance(s) of Chamber Music | (Bulgaria) Evgeni Bozhanov and (South Korea) Yeol Eum Son | cash award of US $3,000 each |
| Beverly Taylor Smith Award for the Best Performance of a New Work | (Japan) Nobuyuki Tsujii | cash award of US $5,000 |
| John Giordano Jury Chairman Discretionary Award | (Italy) Alessandro Deljavan | cash award of US $4,000 |
| Raymond E. Buck Jury Discretionary Award | (Czech Republic) Lukáš Vondráček | cash award of US $4,000 |
| Jury Discretionary Award | (Russia) Eduard Kunz | cash award of US $4,000 |
| Internet Voter Award | (Italy) Mariangela Vacatello (23.9%) (Japan) Nobuyuki Tsujii (22.6%) (South Korea) Yeol Eum Son (15.9%) | |

== Competition results, by rounds ==
=== Screening Auditions ===
(China) Shanghai - Shanghai Conservatory, He Lu Ting Concert Hall, January 15–17, 2009

- (China) Yunjie Chen
- (Australia) Roger Longjie Cui
- (Australia) Christine Luo
- (Japan) Yoshito Numasawa
- (China) Wenyu Shen
- (China) Tom Tang
- (China) Chun Wang
- (China) Shiran Wang
- (China) Tianyang Wang
- (China) Zhefei Wang
- (China) Chi Wu
- (China) Yashuangzi Xie
- (China) Chenxin Xu
- (China) Feng Zhang
- (China) Yu Zhang
- (China) Ning Zhou
- (China) Xixi Zhou

(Germany) Hanover - Hochschule für Musik und Theater Hannover, January 20–24, 2009

- (United Kingdom) Ron Abramski
- (Germany) Hinrich Alpers
- (Bulgaria) Evgeni Bozhanov
- (Russia) Evgeny Tcherepanov
- (South Korea) Jae-won Cheung
- (South Korea) Eugene Choi
- (France) Romain David
- (Croatia) Martina Filjak
- (Germany) Andreas Hering
- (South Korea) Soyeon Kim
- (Ukraine) Natacha Kudritskaya
- (Russia) Aleksey Lebedev
- (Hong Kong) Colleen Lee
- (Georgia (country)) Tamara Licheli
- (Uzbekistan) (Germany) Michail Lifits
- (Russia) Maria Masycheva
- (Germany) Benjamin Moser
- (Ukraine) Dmytro Onyschenko
- (Finland) Satu Paavola
- (United States) Esther Park
- (Moldova) (Spain) Marianna Prjevalskaya
- (Russia) Ilya Rashkovsky
- (Belgium) Philippe Raskin
- (Japan) Mayumi Sakamoto
- (Switzerland) Louis Schwizgebel-Wang
- (South Korea) Yeol Eum Son
- (Hong Kong) (Canada) Avan Yu

(Russia) Saint Petersburg - N.A. Rimsky-Korsakov State Conservatory, January 26–27, 2009

- (Russia) Vladimir Farkov
- (Russia) Vyacheslav Gryaznov
- (Russia) Andrey Gugnin
- (Russia) Sofya Gulyak
- (Russia) Evgeny Izotov
- (Ukraine) Vadym Kholodenko
- (Israel) Yaron Kohlberg
- (Russia) Asiya Korepanova
- (Russia) Eduard Kunz
- (Russia) Alexander Maslov
- (Ukraine) Dinara Nadzhafova
- (Russia) Alexandre Pirojenko
- (Russia) Sergey Sobolev
- (Ukraine) Kateryna Titova
- (Russia) Alexander Yakovlev

(Switzerland) Lugano - Radiotelevisione Svizzera di lingua Italiana, February 1–3, 2009

- (Italy) Gloria Campaner
- (Italy) Alessandro Deljavan
- (Russia) (Switzerland) Dmitry Demyashkin
- (France) François Dumont
- (Armenia) Gayane Gasparyan
- (Uzbekistan) Irena Gulzarova
- (South Korea) Soyeon Ham
- (Taiwan) Ching-Yun Hu
- (Russia) Alexander Karpeyev
- (Russia) Tatyana Kolesova
- (Russia) Olga Kozlova
- (Hungary) István Lajkó
- (China) Ji Liu
- (Iceland) Vikingur Olafsson
- (France) Tristan Pfaff
- (Israel) Matan Porat
- (Belarus) Timur Shcherbakov
- (Poland) Marian Sobula
- (Ukraine) (Israel) Victor Stanislavsky
- (South Korea) Sujung Sun
- (Italy) Alessandro Taverna
- (Italy) Mariangela Vacatello
- (Czech Republic) Lukáš Vondráček
- (Poland) (Canada) Daniel Wnukowski
- (Japan) Takashi Yamamoto
- (South Korea) William Youn
- (Italy) Maurizio Zaccaria
- (Russia) Maria Tcherpnov

(United States) New York - Rockefeller University, February 12–14, 2009

- (Russia) Evgeny Andreev
- (United States) Carlos Ávila
- (Czech Republic) Jan Bartoš
- (Armenia) Yelena Beriyeva
- (United States) Stephen Beus
- (China) Yue Chu
- (Israel) Ran Dank
- (United States) Gregory DeTurck
- (United States) Christopher Falzone
- (Egypt) Wael Farouk
- (Ukraine) Anna Fedorova
- (United States) Tanya Gabrielian
- (Ukraine) Pavel Gintov
- (South Korea) Yoonjung Han
- (China) Miao Hou
- (Russia) Gleb Ivanov
- (Russia) Ilya Kazantsev
- (United States) Sean Kennard
- (United States) Ben Kim
- (South Korea) Kyu Yeon Kim
- (Australia) Andrea Lam
- (South Korea) Soyeon Lee
- (South Korea) Dong-Hyek Lim
- (South Korea) Dong-Min Lim
- (Lithuania) Edvinas Minkstimas
- (United States) Spencer Myer
- (Australia) Hoang Pham
- (Russia) Vassily Primakov
- (Ukraine) Serhiy Salov
- (Japan) Shohei Sekimoto
- (Ukraine) (United States) Anna Shelest
- (Ukraine) Konstantin Soukhovetski
- (China) Diyi Tang
- (China) Jue Wang
- (China) Di Wu
- (China) Hong Xu
- (Japan) (Canada) Ryo Yanagitani
- (China) Amy Yang
- (Israel) Einav Yarden
- (United States) Wei-Jen Yuan
- (China) Haochen Zhang
- (United States) Eric Zuber
- (China) Zhang Zuo
- (South Korea) (United States) Jenny Deborah Han

(United States) Fort Worth, Texas - Texas Christian University, February 21–24, 2009

- (United States) Jun Asai
- (Venezuela) Kristhyan Benitez
- (United States) Sara Daneshpour
- (Hungary) Tamas Ardi
- (United States) Christopher Guzmán
- (Kazakhstan) Tanya Karyagyna
- (Russia) Stanislav Khristenko
- (Japan) (United States) Naomi Kudo
- (Ukraine) (Canada) Dmitri Levkovich
- (China) (Canada) Ang Li
- (Russia) Anastasia Markina
- (Greece) Dimitris Papadimitriou
- (Colombia) Eduardo Rojas
- (Brazil) Aleyson Scopel
- (United States) Andrew Staupe
- (South Korea) Young-Ah Tak
- (Ukraine) Konstantyn Travinsky
- (Japan) Nobuyuki Tsujii
- (Greece) Vassilis Varvaresos
- (Mexico) Abdiel Vazquez
- (China) Ti Xin
- (Russia) Ilya Yakushev

=== Preliminary round ===
(United States) Fort Worth, Texas - Bass Performance Hall, May 22–26, 2009

- (United States) Stephen Beus
- (Bulgaria) Evgeni Bozhanov
- (China) Yue Chu (withdrew before Preliminary round due to hand injury)
- (Israel) Ran Dank
- (Italy) Alessandro Deljavan
- (South Korea) Yoonjung Han
- (South Korea) Kyu Yeon Kim
- (Japan) (United States) Naomi Kudo
- (Ukraine) Natacha Kudritskaya
- (Russia) Eduard Kunz
- (Australia) Andrea Lam
- (South Korea) Soyeon Lee
- (China) (Canada) Ang Li
- (Uzbekistan) (Germany) Michail Lifits
- (United States) Spencer Myer
- (Russia) Ilya Rashkovsky
- (Japan) Mayumi Sakamoto
- (South Korea) Yeol Eum Son
- (Ukraine) (Israel) Victor Stanislavsky
- (United States) Chetan Tierra
- (Japan) Nobuyuki Tsujii
- (Italy) Mariangela Vacatello
- (Greece) Vassilis Varvaresos
- (Czech Republic) Lukáš Vondráček
- (China) Di Wu
- (China) Amy Yang
- (China) Feng Zhang
- (China) Haochen Zhang
- (China) Ning Zhou
- (China) Zhang Zuo

=== Semifinalists ===
- (Bulgaria) Evgeni Bozhanov
- (Israel) Ran Dank
- (Italy) Alessandro Deljavan
- (South Korea) Kyu Yeon Kim
- (Russia) Eduard Kunz
- (Australia) Andrea Lam
- (Uzbekistan) (Germany) Michail Lifits
- (South Korea) Yeol Eum Son
- (Japan) Nobuyuki Tsujii
- (Italy) Mariangela Vacatello
- (China) Di Wu
- (China) Haochen Zhang

=== Finalists ===
- (Bulgaria) Evgeni Bozhanov
- (South Korea) Yeol Eum Son
- (Japan) Nobuyuki Tsujii
- (Italy) Mariangela Vacatello
- (China) Di Wu
- (China) Haochen Zhang

== Competition Documentary ==
Like previous Cliburn Competitions, a competition documentary was produced called A Surprise in Texas, directed by Peter Rosen who directed several previous Cliburn documentaries. It premiered on April 11, 2010 at the Dallas International Film Festival and was broadcast nationwide in the USA on Public Broadcasting Service (PBS) television starting on September 1, 2010.
