= Twelfth Van Cliburn International Piano Competition =

The Twelfth Van Cliburn International Piano Competition took place in Fort Worth, Texas from May 20 to June 5, 2005. It was won by Russian pianist Alexander Kobrin, while Joyce Yang and Sa Chen were awarded the Silver and bronze medals.

== Jurors ==
- (United States) John Giordano (chairman)
- (Italy) Marcello Abbado
- (Germany) Peter Cossé
- (United States) Richard Dyer
- (United States) Claude Frank
- (United States) Thomas Frost
- (United States) Joseph Kalichstein
- (Germany) Jürgen Meyer-Josten
- (United States) Menahem Pressler
- (Poland) Tadeusz Strugała
- (China) Guangren Zhou

== Links ==
- 13th Van Cliburn International Competition

== Results ==
Contestant	R1	SF	F
(Ukraine) Lilian Akopova			
(China) Ning An			
(Italy) Giuseppe Andaloro			
(United States) Stephen Beus			
(Nigeria) Sodi Braide			
(Italy) Davide Cabassi			
(China) Jie Chen			
(China) Sa Chen			Bronze medal
(China) Ying Feng			
(United States) Grace Fong			
(Italy) Davide Franceschetti			
(Ukraine) Alexey Grynyuk			
(China) Chu-Fang Huang			
(Ukraine) Mariya Kim			
(Russia) Alexander Kobrin			Gold medal
(Russia) Marina Kolomytseva			
(Ukraine) Alexey Koltakov			
(South Korea) So-yeon Lee			
(Canada) Ang Li			
(Taiwan) Chih-Han Liu			
(Israel) Albert Mamriev			
(Venezuela) Gabriela Martínez			
(Russia) Maria Mazo			
(Russia) Alexandre Moutouzkine			
(United States) Esther Park			
(Italy) Roberto Plano			
(Russia) Daria Rabotkina			
(Russia) Ilya Rashkovsky			
(United States) Elizabeth Joy Roe			
(China) Rui Shi			
(Russia) Rem Urasin			
(China) Xiaohan Wang			
(China) Di Wu			
(South Korea) Joyce Yang			Silver medal
(Lithuania) Andrius Zlabys			

== See also ==
- Thirteenth Van Cliburn International Piano Competition
