= Joyce Yang =

Joyce Yang (양희원)
- Born: April 11, 1986 (age 39); Seoul, Korea
- Genres: Classical music; contemporary classical
- Occupation: Pianist
- Website: pianistjoyceyang.com

Joyce Yang (Korean name 양희원, born 11 April 1986 in Seoul, Korea) is a classical pianist. Yang was awarded the silver medal at the 2005 Van Cliburn International Piano Competition at the age of 19, the youngest competitor there. During the same competition, Joyce was also awarded both the Steven De Groote Memorial Award for Best Performance of Chamber Music, as well as the Beverley Taylor Smith Award for the Best Performance of a New Work.

At age nine, Yang went to New York with her mother and aunt to play for Yoheved Kaplinsky. At age ten she entered the Korean National Conservatory studying under Choong Mo Kang. In 1997 Joyce moved to the United States, and began studying in the Juilliard School's pre-college division with Kaplinsky. While in New York, she attended Ward Melville High School in Suffolk County, while her mother, a molecular biologist, was at SUNY Stony Brook.

As a 16-year-old, she performed with the Millikin-Decatur Symphony Orchestra in 2002, performing Beethoven's Piano Concerto No. 1. Other engagements by that age had taken place in conjunction with the Baltimore Symphony, the Long Island Philharmonic, the National Symphony Orchestra, and the Philadelphia Orchestra.

Yang graduated from Juilliard's college division with a bachelor of music degree in 2010 and a special honor, as the recipient of that year's Arthur Rubinstein Prize.

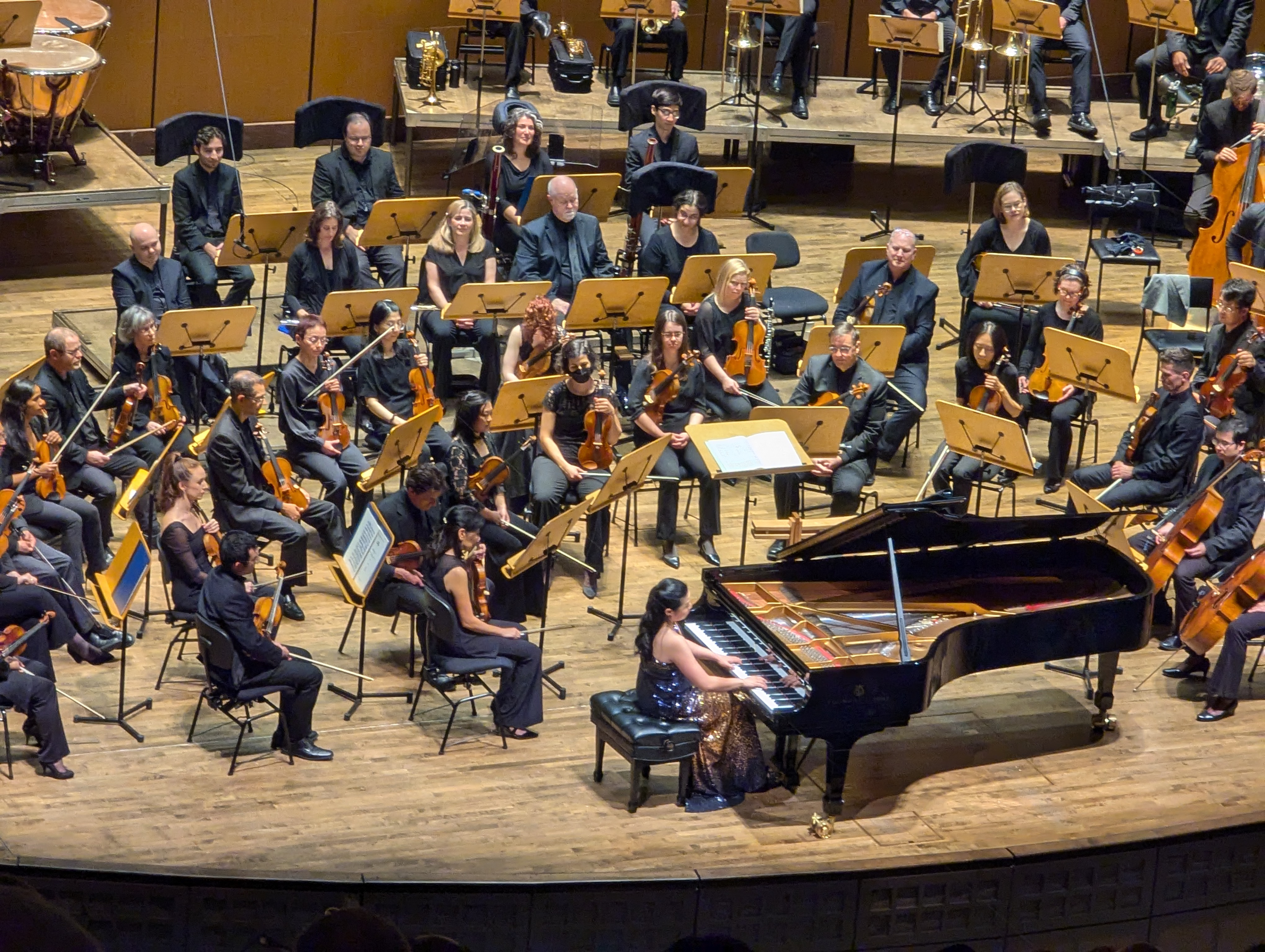
Yang playing with the Oregon Symphony in 2024; the program featured Liszt's Totentanz

By 2014 she had an increasingly successful career as a soloist and performer of concertos and was also establishing herself as a chamber musician. Her 2014 recordings with the Alexander String Quartet of quintet pieces by Brahms and Schuman were favorably reviewed.

A review by New York Times music critic Zachary Woolfe of Yang's rendition of Rachmaninoff's Piano Concerto No. 1, played in 2014 with the New York Philharmonic at Avery Fisher Hall, said that it was a "sumptuous, powerful, subtle performance ... Even her most poundingly virtuosic passages were distinguished by a variety of touch and color, and she was sensitive throughout to the piano’s interactions with the orchestra." A review by Corinna da Fonseca-Wollheim in the same newspaper said of Yang's 2016 performance of the Manuel de Falla composition Nights in the Gardens of Spain with the New York Philharmonic said she gave the solo part in it a "temperamental yet crisp reading ... which was sometimes overwhelmed by colorful but overly loud orchestral playing. Ms. Yang proved especially attuned to the various roles the piano assumed, slipping into the guise of percussionist one moment, only to soften into silky melodic playing the next."

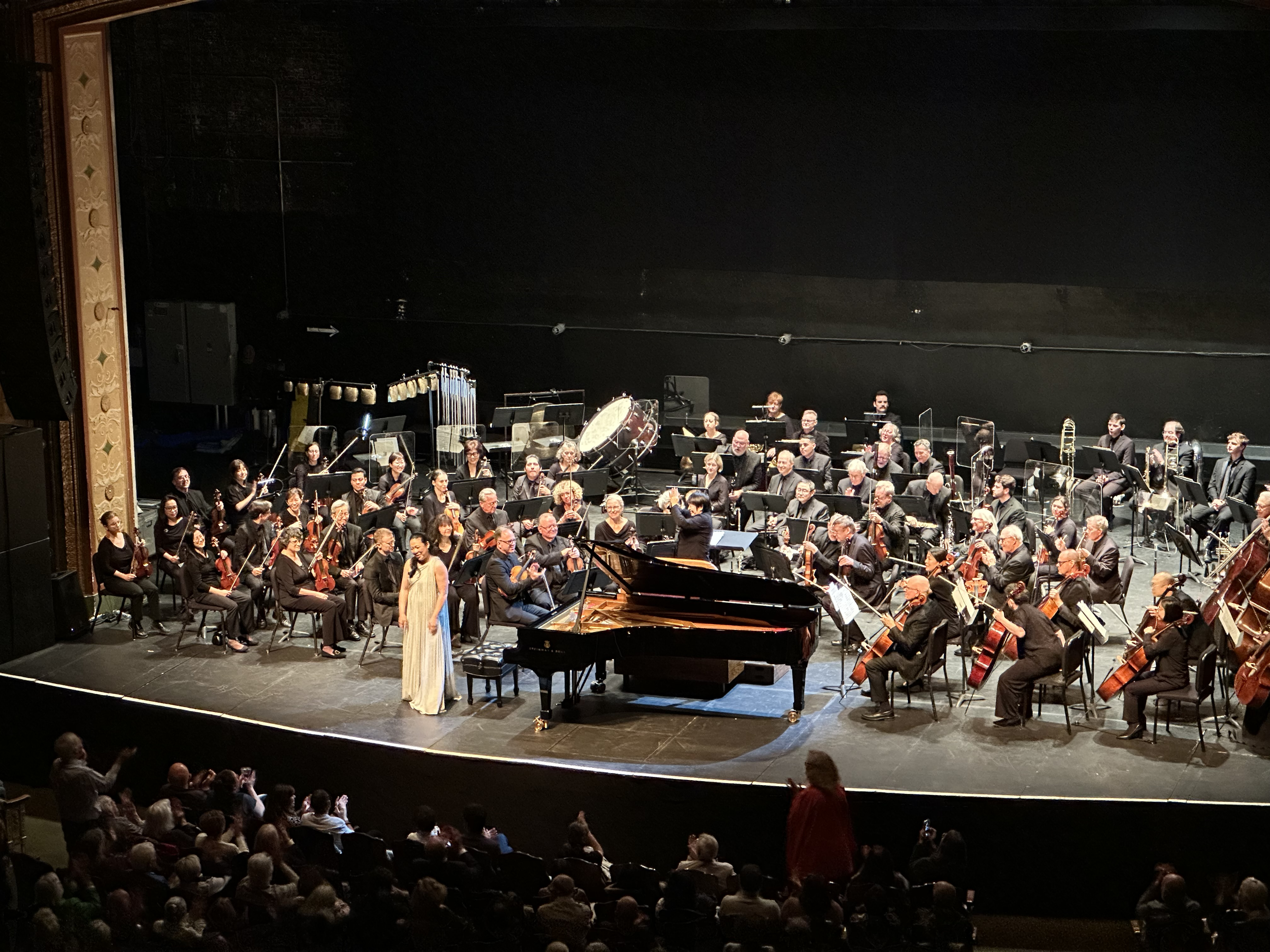
Yang accepting applause from the audience and from conductor Xian Zhang and the New Jersey Symphony at the conclusion of a performance of Tchaikovsky's Piano Concerto No. 1 in 2025

Joyce Yang performed as soloist with the Kansas City Symphony for the world premiere of Jonathan Leshnoff's Piano Concerto in 2019. She has made a number of appearances with the Wichita Symphony Orchestra.

== 2017 Grammy Award nomination ==
On November 28, 2017 Yang and Italian violinist Augustin Hadelich's 2016 album Works for Violin and Piano by Franck, Kurtág, Previn, Schumann was nominated for the 60th Annual Grammy Award for Best Chamber Music/Small Ensemble Performance in the Classical Music category. It was Yang's first Grammy Award nomination.

== Debuts ==
venue	date	work
Dallas Symphony Orchestra	6 June 2009	Rachmaninoff Piano Concerto Number 2

== Discography ==
date	title	type	artists	publisher	notes	reference
11 October 2005	Twelfth Van Cliburn International Piano Competition; Joyce Yang, Silver Medalist	solo recording	Joyce Yang	Harmonia Mundi		
11 October 2011	Collage	solo recording	Joyce Yang	Avie Records		
11 February 2014	Tchaikovsky: Tempest, Piano Concerto No. 1	orchestral	Joyce Yang; Alexander Lazarev, conductor Odense Symphony Orchestra	Bridge Records	debut concerto recording	
11 March 2014	Wild Dreams	solo recording	Joyce Yang	Avie Records		
11 March 2014	Brahms & Schumann: The Piano Quintets	chamber music	Joyce Yang; Alexander String Quartet	Foghorn Classics		
13 September 2016	Michael Torke: Three Manhattan Bridges	orchestral	Joyce Yang, piano Julie Albers, cello David Alan Miller, conductor Albany Symphony Orchestra	Albany Records		
11 November 2016	Works for Violin and Piano by Franck, Kurtág, Previn, Schumann	chamber music	Augustin Hadelich, violin Joyce Yang, piano	Avie Records	nominated for 2018 Grammy Award for Best Chamber Music/Small Ensemble Performance	
