= Mariangela Vacatello =

Italian pianist (born 1982)

- Born: January 22, 1982 (age 44); Castellammare di Stabia, Naples, Italy
- Genres: Classical
- Occupation: Musician
- Instrument: Piano
- Years active: 1996–present
- Website: www.mariangelavacatello.com

Mariangela Vacatello (born January 22, 1982) is an Italian classical concert pianist from Naples.

== Early life ==
Vacatello comes from a musical family: her mother, Pina, was a pianist and now is a piano teacher and her father, Antonio, is a piano tuner as well as a professor and musician. When Vacatello was four years old, she began attending the Yamaha Music Course. At age seven, she went on to study piano with Aldo Tramma, a pupil of the famous Italian pianist and pedagogue Vincenzo Vitale. She was subsequently admitted to the International Piano Academy "Incontri col Maestro" in Imola where she became a maestro in 2006 after studying under the guidance of Franco Scala and Piero Rattalino. She also studied at the Milan Conservatory with Riccardo Risaliti and Paolo Bordoni where in 1999 she obtained her piano degree with cum Laude Honourable mention. In the same conservatory, Vacatello studied composition for several years with Bruno Zanolini and Fabio Vacchi. Vacatello completed Postgraduate Piano Performance Courses at the Royal Academy of Music in London with Christopher Elton and with Dominique Merlet in Paris. She participated in masterclasses held by Alexander Lonquich, Louis Lortie, Andreij Jasinskj, Leslie Howard, Michael Dalberto, Andrea Lucchesini, Alexis Weissenberg, Vitaly Margulis, Sergeij Dorensky, Eliso Virsaladze.

She is a recipient of the Sterndale Bennett Scholarship, and was awarded numerous awards including from the Musicians Benevolence Fund (Dame Myra Hess Award), The Tillet Trust, Hattori Foundation, The Solti Foundation and the Acadèmie musicale de Villecroze.

== Career ==
At the age of 14 she made her first public appearance with the Pomeriggi Musicali Orchestra in Milan playing Liszt 1st Piano Concerto. Since then she has appeared in the most prestigious Italian venues and festivals like Festival Bergamo e Brescia, Società dei Concerti in Milan, Teatro Dal Verme, MiTo Settembre Musica Festival, Lingotto in Turin, "Maggio Musicale Fiorentino", "Festival delle Nazioni" in Città di Castello, Teatro Olimpico in Vicenza, MittelFest in Cividale del Friuli, Teatro Bibiena in Mantova, Sala Greppi in Bergamo, Amici della Musica and Teatro Filarmonico in Verona, Accademia Filarmonica in Bologna, Associazione Scarlatti in Naples, Parco della Musica, Villa Medici and Accademia Filarmonica Romana in Rome, Sagra Musicale Umbra.

She also performs in the international concert arena and some of her engagements have been for Montpellier Festival in summer 2006, Salle Cortot and the Societè Chopin in Paris, Festival Chopin in Duszniki Zsdroj, Berlin Konzerthause, Mozarteum Auditorium in Salzburg, Bozar and Theatre de la Monnaie in Bruxelles, Lisinsky Hall in Zagreb, Wigmore Hall in London, Chichester Festival, Buxton Festival, Bridgewater Hall in Manchester, Linder Auditorium in Johannesburg, Z.K.M. Great Hall in Pretoria, Palacio de Festivales di Santander, Bargemusic and Carnegie Hall in New York City, Walt Disney Hall in Los Angeles, Krevis Centre in Florida, International Keyboard Festival in New York City, MusicFest in Vancouver, Shanghai Oriental Art Center, Beijing Center for Performing Arts. In September 2003 she played several times in Mexico and toured South Africa in 2004 and 2006, where her performances got standing ovations and rave reviews.

Besides recitals she also appeared with various orchestras such as the Philharmonic of Teatro alla Scala, Orchestra Nazionale di Santa Cecilia, Orchestra RAI, Johannesburg, Pannon, Stuttgart, and Zagreb Philharmonic Orchestras as well as Lithuanian Symphony, Belgrade Philharmonic Orchestra, Tucson Symphony Orchestra, Colorado Springs, Erie Philharmonics, Asheville Symphony, Orchestra della Magna Grecia, Odessa Philharmonic Orchestra, Colorado Springs Symphony, Oduring which Mariangela was under guidance of such conductors as Andris Nelsons, Krystoph Penderecky, Christopher Franklin, Bernard Gueller, Martin Haselboeck, Zsolt Hamar, David Itkin, Daniel Kawka, Gerard Korsten, Gustav Kuhn, Anton Nanut, Piero Romano, Donato Renzetti, Giordano Bellincampi, Carolyn Kuan, Daniel Meyer, Kristian Jaarvi, Andrè Orozco-Estrada, and Michael Tabachnik. Mariangela has also collaborated in chamber music with both Takács and Ysaÿe Quartets as well as musicians such as Timothy Fain, Rocco Filippini, Ilya Grubert, Gary and Toby Hoffman, Francesco Tamiati, Giovanni Gnocchi, Natasha Korsakova.

Vacatello's performances are regularly broadcast by prestigious radio stations such as Radio France Musique, Musiq3 Belgique, Radio Svizzera Italiana, Radio 3 Italia, Radio Pretoria and several American radio stations.

In 2013 Vacatello brought on stage "THE TWILIGHT CONCERT," "a journey, which rises in absolute darkness and gradually takes us to the discovery of primordial glares and reassuring reflections. A long succession of days and nights, the alternation of light and dark, flashes of joy and depths of despair, dawns with touches of hope and colorful sunsets of disillusion... this is life, our life!"The musical journey that Mariangela Vacatello thought for this concert is both narrative and summary of this ideal.

In June 2016 she and Quatuor Zäide performed the world premier of ‘Unrisen’ for SmartPianoQuintet by Marco Momi. Classical performances and deep contemporary music met in Paris with the new technology made in Ircam: electronic sound through instruments —- that is, without speakers.

Since 2024 she has been the artistic director of the Cantiere Internazionale d'arte in Montepulciano

== Selected competitions and awards ==
- 1998 - VII Concorso di Pianoforte "Marco Bramanti", Forte dei Marmi; first prize
- 1999 – Franz Liszt International Piano Competition, Utrecht; second prize
- 2000 – XVII Premio Venezia
- 2000 – "G. Verdi Award: music for life", Ass. Ami Milan
- 2005 — Ferruccio Busoni International Piano Competition, Bolzano; second prize
- 2006 – Sterndale Bennet Award
- 2007 – Jean Ginsburg Award
- 2007 – Queen Elisabeth Music Competition, Brussels; laureate prize
- 2008 – Franz Reizenstein Award
- 2008 – Isang Yun in Memorian, Tongyon Third Prize
- 2009 – Top of the World International Piano Competition, Tromsø; first prize
- 2009 – Thirteenth Van Cliburn International Piano Competition, Fort Worth; finalist and Worldwide Audience Award
- 2009 – Premio Carloni, L'Aquila
- 2014 – Artist in residence "Les Promesses de L'Art", Paris, Italian Institute of culture

== Recordings ==
- 2008 – '900 Virtuoso Piano Works (Fondazione U. Micheli)
- 2011 – Franz Liszt 12 Études d'exécution transcendante (Brilliant Classics)
- 2012 – Claude Debussy 12 Etudes, Estampes, Deux Arabesques, L'Isle joyeuse (Brilliant Classics)
- 2012 – Franz Liszt Sonata in B minor for piano (Amadeus Magazine)
- 2015 – Alberto Ginastera Complete Piano Music (Brilliant Classics)

== Personal life ==
Vacatello is now living in Perugia, Umbria (Italy), together with her husband, the organist of Perugia's "St. Lorenz" Cathedral Adriano Falcioni. They both tour worldwide for concerts.
