= Haochen Zhang =

Chinese pianist (born 1990)

- 张昊辰
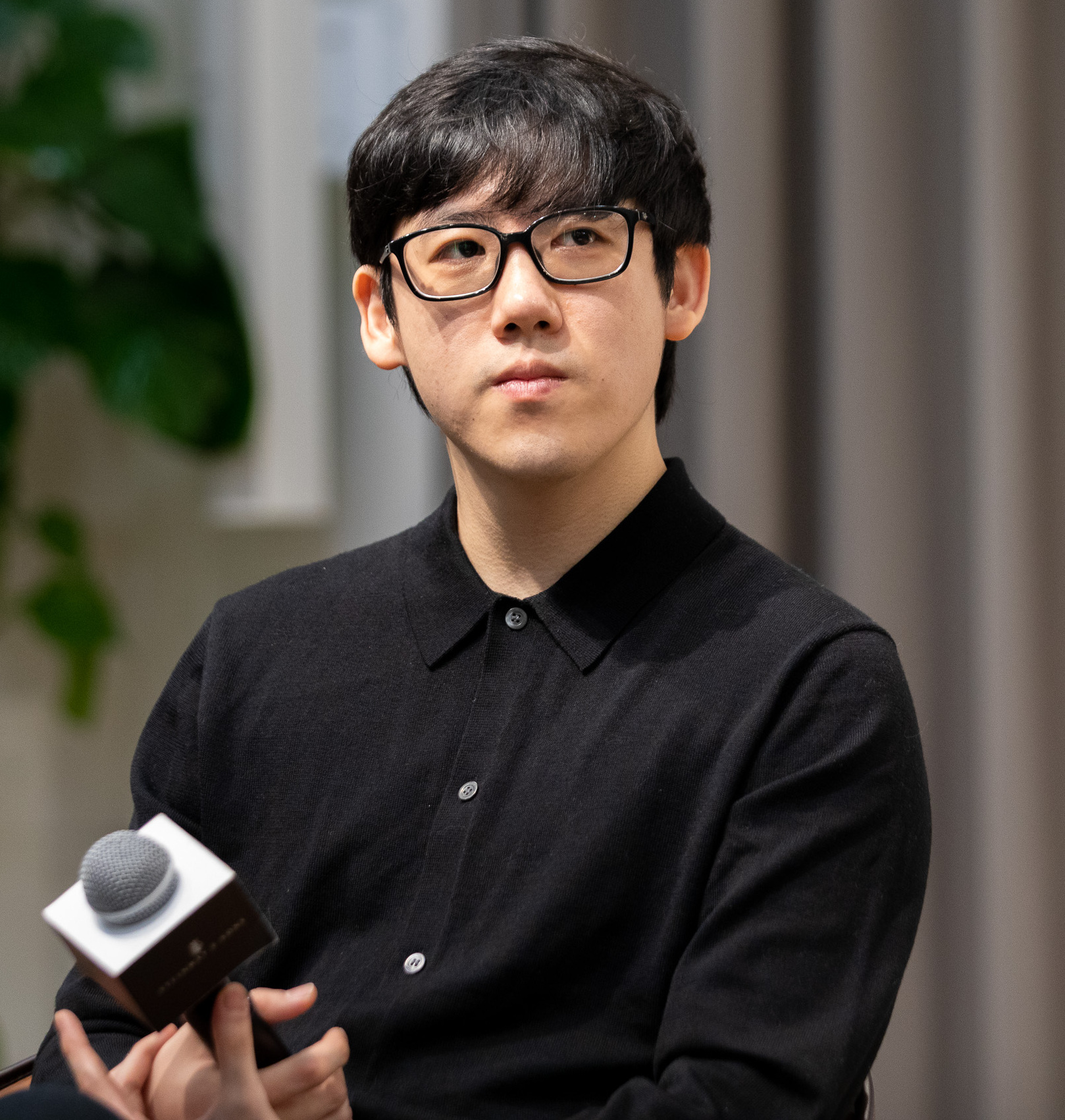
- Zhang at a press conference in Shanghai in 2021
- Born: June 3, 1990 (age 36); Shanghai, China
- Occupation: Classical pianist
- Years active: 1995–present
- Website: haochenzhang.com

Zhang Haochen (Chinese: 张昊辰; pinyin: Zhāng Hàochén; born June 3, 1990) is a Chinese pianist. He won gold at the 13th Van Cliburn International Piano Competition in 2009, becoming one of the youngest winners in the history of the competition. Zhang received an Avery Fisher Career Grant in 2017.

== Early life ==
Zhang began studying piano at three and a half and gave his debut recital at the Shanghai Music Hall at the age of five, performing Haydn and Mozart sonatas, in addition to all 15 of Bach’s two-part inventions. By six, he gave his orchestral debut playing Mozart’s Piano Concerto K. 467 with the Shanghai Symphony Orchestra. He was awarded first prize at the Shanghai Piano Competition at the age of seven and again at nine. At eleven, Zhang gave tours in all the major cities in China performing Beethoven and Mozart Sonatas and the complete Chopin Etudes Op. 10. At twelve, Zhang won the 4th International Tchaikovsky Competition for Young Musicians, becoming the youngest winner in the history of the competition. In 2004, he made his debut at the 49th International Chopin Festival in Duszniki, Poland, performing the complete Chopin Etudes Op. 25.

In 2005, Zhang moved to the United States to attend the Curtis Institute of Music with a full-tuition scholarship as a Harold and Helene Schonberg Fellow to study under the world-renowned Gary Graffman, who also taught Lang Lang and Yuja Wang. The following year, he made his debut with the Philadelphia Orchestra performing Rachmaninov's Second Piano Concerto.

In October 2007, at just 17 years of age Zhang became the youngest winner of the China International Piano Competition; and in 2008, at the age of 18, he made his Carnegie Hall debut with the New York Youth Symphony performing Mozart's D minor Concerto K.466 and the world premiere of a commissioned work by Ryan Gallagher.

== Career ==
In June 2009, Zhang became the first Chinese competitor to be awarded the Nancy Lee and Perry R. Bass Gold Medal at the Thirteenth Van Cliburn International Piano Competition. As part of his prize package, Zhang received commission-free artist management from the Van Cliburn Foundation for three seasons following the competition. Immediately after winning the Gold Medal, Zhang embarked on an extensive three-year tour across the United States and abroad playing an incredible 200 concerts in the Americas, Asia, and Europe, including solos at distinguished festivals such as Beijing Music Festival and the Gilmore International Keyboard Music Festival.

February 10, 2017 Zhang released his first studio album on BIS Records including Schumann's Kinderszenen, Liszt's Ballade No. 2 in B Minor, Brahms's Three Intermezzi, and Janácek's Piano Sonata 1.X.1905, "From the Street."

He is currently managed by Kanzen Arts and KAJIMOTO.

=== Notable performances ===
Zhang has performed with the London Symphony Orchestra, Staatskapelle Berlin, Staatskapelle Dresden, London Philharmonic Orchestra, Philadelphia Orchestra, San Francisco Symphony, Los Angeles Philharmonic, Israel Philharmonic Orchestra, Orchestre National du Capitole de Toulouse, Frankfurt Radio Symphony, Mariinsky Orchestra, NHK Symphony Orchestra, Sydney Symphony Orchestra and the Hong Kong Philharmonic, and has played concerts throughout Asia, Europe, and the United States including Aspen Music Festival.

In April 2013, Zhang made his debut in Munich with the Munich Philharmonic and the late maestro Lorin Maazel. In 2014, he made his debut at the BBC Proms with Yu Long and the China Philharmonic playing Liszt's Piano Concerto No. 1.

In October 2017, Zhang replaced Lang Lang, whose arm was injured, in China NCPA's Carnegie Hall debut led by Lü Jia.

In January 2020, Zhang made his debut with the New York Philharmonic in a Lunar New Year concert with Long Yu and he returned for his New York Philharmonic subscription debut with Anna Rakitina in March 2022.

== Discography ==
Year	Album	Label
2025	Beethoven – Hammerklavier Sonata; Liszt – Sonata in B minor (Hybrid SACD)	BIS Records
2023	Liszt – Transcendental Etudes (Hybrid SACD)	BIS Records
2022	Beethoven – The 5 Piano Concertos; The Philadelphia Orchestra, Nathalie Stutzmann	BIS Records
2019	Tchaikovsky - Piano Concerto #1; Prokofiev – Piano Concerto #2; Lahti Symphony Orchestra, cond. Dima Slobodeniouk	BIS Records
2017	Schumann, Liszt, Janácek, Brahms	BIS Records
2009	13th Van Cliburn International Piano Competition	Harmonia Mundi
2009	2009 Van Cliburn International Piano Competition: Final Round – Haochen Zhang	Van Cliburn Foundation

== Awards ==
Year	Award	Rank
2017	Avery Fisher Career Grant	
2009	13th Van Cliburn International Piano Competition	Gold
2007	China International Piano Competition	1st
2006	Albert M. Greenfield Student Competition	1st
2002	4th International Tchaikovsky Competition for Young Musicians	1st
1999	Shanghai Piano Competition	1st
1997	Shanghai Piano Competition	1st

== Personal life ==
Zhang is based in Philadelphia. He has interests in many other fields, including history and literature.
