= Yeol Eum Son =

South Korean pianist (born 1986)

Yeol Eum Son 손열음
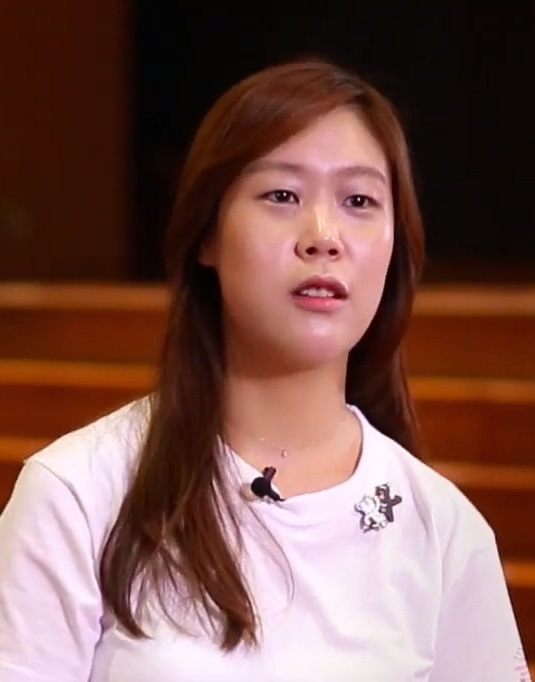

Background information
- Born: May 2, 1986 (age 40); Wonju, South Korea
- Education: Hochschule für Musik, Theater und Medien Hannover
- Genre: Classical
- Occupation: Classical pianist
- Years active: 1998–present
- Labels: Decca Classics; Harmonia Mundi; Onyx Classics; Naïve Records
- Spouse: Svetlin Roussev
- Awards: 2nd Prize overall, Silver Medal, also winner Best Chamber Concerto (Mozart Concerto) Performance, winner Best Performance of the Commissioned Work (by Rodion Shchedrin) XIV International Tchaikovsky Competition 2011
- Website: yeoleumson.com

Yeol Eum Son (Korean: 손열음; born May 2, 1986) is a South Korean classical pianist. She is an interpreter of the classical period of composers, especially Haydn, Mozart, Beethoven, as well as such later composers as Mendelssohn, Schumann, Liszt, Rachmaninoff and Ravel. Son has attained international recognition for her performances of Mozart's piano concertos and sonatas.

Son is an internationally recognized concert pianist with major orchestras, performing as soloist with the New York Philharmonic Orchestra, the Los Angeles Philharmonic Orchestra, the London Symphony Orchestra, the BBC Symphony Orchestra, the London Philharmonic Orchestra, the Academy of St. Martin in the Fields, and with such conductors as Lorin Maazel, Sir Neville Marriner, Valery Gergiev, Sir Antonio Pappano, Edward Gardner, Sakari Oramo and Jaap van Zweden. She performs recitals at Carnegie Hall in New York City, US, at Wigmore Hall in London, UK and at the Edinburgh International Festival in UK.

== Education ==
Son was born in Wonju, South Korea.

Son took her first piano lesson at the age of three and a half. She made a recital debut on Kumho Prodigy Concert Series in July 1998. At the age of twelve, she started studying with pianist Kim Dae-jin. At age sixteen, she entered the Korea National University of Arts to continue her piano studies. At the age of 18, she recorded the complete Chopin Etudes (Op. 10 and Op. 25) for a CD on the Universal Music Label.

In 2006, she began studying with Arie Vardi at the Hochschule für Musik und Theatre, in Hannover, Germany, where she currently resides.

== Career ==
=== Competitions ===
Son was awarded the Silver Medal at the International Tchaikovsky Competition in 2011. At the Tchaikovsky Competition she also received the prizes for Best Chamber Concerto Performance and the Best Performance of the Commissioned Work. The video of her performance of the Mozart Piano Concerto No. 21 at the Tchaikovsky Competition has received an estimated 33 million online views.

She had earlier won the Silver Medal at the Thirteenth Van Cliburn International Piano Competition in 2009. In that same competition, she won the Steven De Groote Memorial Award for the Best Performance of Chamber Music.

Son had also won the Bronze Medal at the Arthur Rubinstein International Piano Master Competition (2005).

=== Performances ===
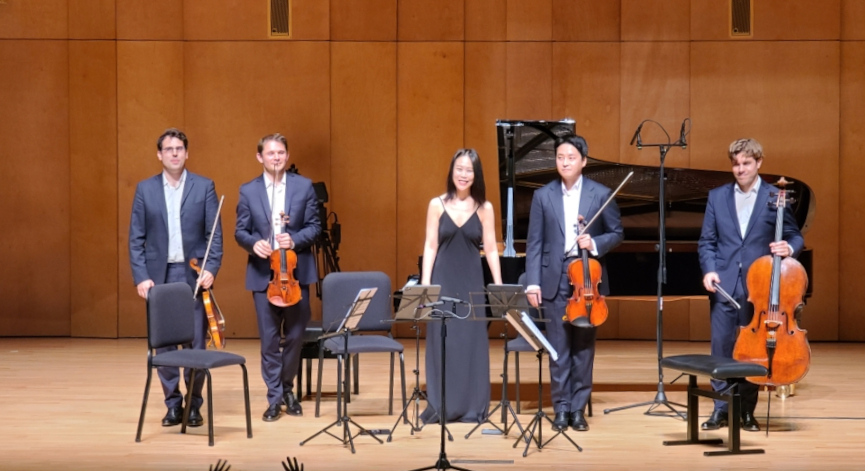
Yeol Eum Son at the 19th Music in PyeongChang, Alpensia Concert Hall, on July 6, 2022

Son first drew international attention in 2004 at age 18 when she appeared as soloist performing Liszt Piano Concerto No. 1 with the New York Philharmonic Orchestra under the baton of Lorin Maazel on their Asia tour in Seoul, Daejeon, and Tokyo. Son again performed with Maazel and the New York Philharmonic when they returned to the Seoul Arts Center in 2008, this time as soloist for Beethoven Piano Concerto No. 2. Son has continued to appear as soloist in the U.S., in 2025 performing the Mozart Piano Concerto No. 24 with the Los Angeles Philharmonic Orchestra conducted by Ryan Bancroft.

In 2022, Son performed the Beethoven Piano Concerto No. 4 at St George's Church in Wismar, Germany. with the NDR Radiophilharmonie conducted by Andrew Manze, later broadcast worldwide on the BBC Radio 3 network.

Son has made many appearances in the UK. In 2018, Son performed the Mozart Piano Concerto No. 21 with the Academy of St Martin in the Fields at Cadogan Hall in London without conductor, in tribute to Sir Neville Marriner, the same week as the release of the recording by Son with Marriner of this work made two years previously. In 2023, Son performed Liszt's Totentanz with the London Symphony Orchestra conducted by Sir Antonio Pappano. Son performed the Tchaikovsky Piano Concerto No. 1 with the London Philharmonic Orchestra conducted by Edward Gardner in 2025, at Saffron Hall in Saffron Walden, UK. In 2026, Son performed the Bartók Piano Concerto No. 3 and the Eclogue for Piano and String Orchestra by Gerald Finzi with the BBC Symphony Orchestra at Barbican Hall conducted by Sakari Oramo, broadcast live on the BBC television network.

In 2026, Son made her second appearance at the BBC Proms festival, performing the Gershwin Piano Concerto in F with James Gaffigan conducting the BBC Symphony Orchestra at the Royal Albert Hall in London, UK, broadcast live worldwide on the BBC Radio 3 network.

=== Recordings ===
Son's recording in 2016 of the Mozart Piano Concerto No. 21 with Sir Neville Marriner and the Academy of St. Martin in the Fields was Marriner's final recording, and was selected by Classic FM as Album of the Week. Son composed her own cadenzas for this concerto. Marriner and Son had planned to record the complete Mozart concertos. The recording was released on the Onyx label in May 2018.

In February 2023 Son's recordings of the complete Mozart Piano Sonatas were released on the Naive label, and named Classic FM Album of the Week.

In May 2025, Son's recording of the two Ravel piano concertos was released, the Piano Concerto in G major and the Left Hand Concerto in D major, with the Residentie Orchestra conducted by Anja Bihlmaier. They were described by one music reviewer as "fizzingly captured readings", the central Adagio movement of the G major "a perfect vehicle for Son's tonal purity" and the left-hand D major WWI-related work "is compellingly brought out...it feels almost programmatic."

On January 8, 2026, Son released recordings of the complete chamber music of Ravel.

== Other activities ==
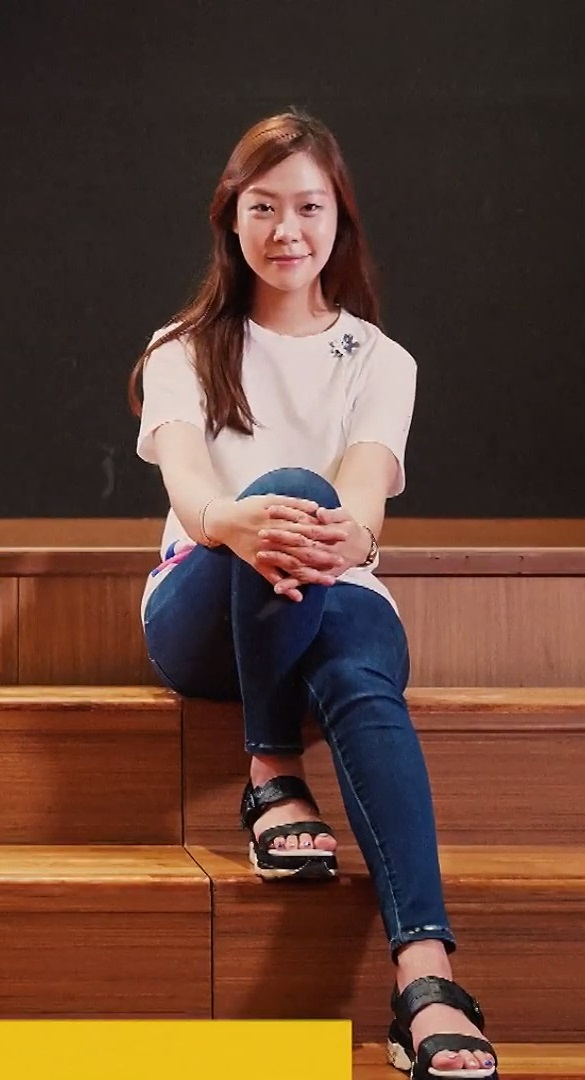
Yeol Eum Son in an interview with Arts Council Korea in 2017

Son was the artistic director of the Music in PyeongChang classical music festival from 2018 to 2022, where she was a frequent performer. From May 2010, she wrote a monthly column for JoongAng Sunday, the Sunday edition of JoongAng Ilbo newspaper. This was compiled as a book in 2015.

== Honours ==
On May 20, 2024, Son was awarded the Grand Prize of the 2024 Daewon Music Awards, recognizing achievement in the performing arts for classical music in South Korea.

== Competition awards ==
- 2008: 1st Prize, Piano Competition Kissinger Klavierolymp, related to the festival Kissinger Sommer
- 2011: 2nd Prize overall, Silver Medal, also winner Best Chamber Concerto (Mozart Concerto) Performance, winner Best Performance of the Commissioned Work (by Rodion Shchedrin) XIV International Tchaikovsky Competition

== Discography ==
- 2004: "Chopin: 24 Etudes" (Universal Music)
- 2008: "Chopin: Nocturnes for Piano and Orchestra" (Universal Music)
- 2009: "13th Van Cliburn Competition: Yeol Eum Son, Silver Medalist" (Harmonia Mundi)
- 2012: "Yeol Eum Son, Piano" (O'new World Music)
- 2016: "Schumann & Brahms: Sonatas, Romances" (Decca Classics)
- 2016: "Modern Times: Berg, Prokofiev, Stravinsky, Ravel" (Decca Classics)
- 2018: "Mozart: Piano Concerto No.21 K467 / Sonata No.10 K330" (Onyx Classics)
- 2020: "Schumann: Fantasy in C – Kreisleriana – Arabesque" (Onyx Classics)
- 2021: "Kapustin" (Onyx Classics)
- 2023: "Mozart: Complete Piano Sonatas" (Naïve Records)
- 2024: "Love Music" (Naïve Records)
- 2025: "Ravel: Piano Concerto in G major and Concerto for the Left Hand" (Naïve Records)
