= Top of the World International Piano Competition =

The Top of the World IPC was a biennial international piano competition in Tromsø, Norway from 2009–2019. Its first edition took place from June 14–19, 2009 and was won by Mariangela Vacatello.

== 1st edition - 2009 ==
=== Jury ===
  - (Germany) Volker Banfield
  - (United States) David Dubal
  - (Austria) Roland Keller
  - (Denmark) Anne Øland
  - (Finland) Liisa Pohjola
  - (Argentina) Alberto Portugheis
  - (Norway) Einar Steen-Nøkleberg
  - (Hungary) Tamás Vásáry

=== Palmares ===
	Winner
1st Grand Prize	(Italy) **Mariangela Vacatello**
2nd Prize	(Japan) Mayumi Sakamoto
3rd Prize	(Ukraine) Serhiy Salov

=== Competition results, by rounds ===
Pianists in bold advanced to the next round.

- **1st Round, June 14–15. University of Tromsø's Conservatory**
- (United States) **Charlie Albright**
- (Denmark) **Julie Coucheron**
- (Russia) (Israel) **Boris Feiner**
- ** (Japan) Jun Ishimura
- (Israel) **Yaron Kohlberg**
- (Greece) Dimitris Kostopoulos
- (Norway) **Kristian Lindberg**
- (Poland) Piotr Machnik
- (Russia) **Maria Masycheva**
- (Russia) Mikhail Mordvinov
- (Italy) Roberto Plano
- (Russia) Vassily Primakov
- (Lithuania) **Evelina Puzaitė**
- (Japan) **Mayumi Sakamoto**
- (Ukraine) **Serhiy Salov**
- (Denmark) Rikke Sandberg
- (Russia) Nikolai Saratovsky
- (China) Song Yang
- (Russia) Vladimir Sverdlov
- (Italy) **Mariangela Vacatello**
- (Russia) **Ilya Yakushev**

- **2nd Round, June 16–17.**
- (United States) Charlie Albright
- (Denmark) Julie Coucheron
- (Russia) (Israel) Boris Feiner
- ** (Israel) Yaron Kohlberg
- (Norway) Kristian Lindberg
- (Russia) Maria Masycheva
- (Lithuania) Evelina Puzaitė
- (Japan) **Mayumi Sakamoto**
- (Ukraine) **Serhiy Salov**
- (Italy) **Mariangela Vacatello**
- (Russia) Ilya Yakushev

- **Final, June 19.**
  - (Japan) Mayumi Sakamoto
  - (Ukraine) Serhiy Salov
  - (Italy) **Mariangela Vacatello**
