= Valentin Schiedermair =

German pianist (1963–2022)

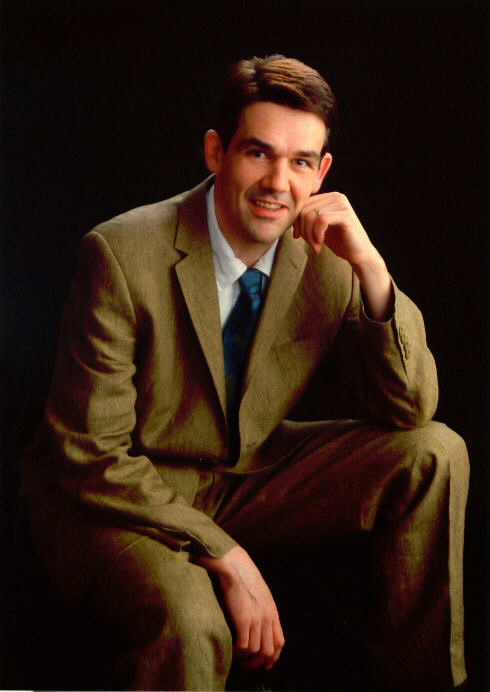
Valentin Schiedermair

Valentin Schiedermair, born 28 October 1963 in Frankfurt/Main, West Germany, died 11 October 2022 in Chelmsford/Essex was a German concert pianist who lived in London.

== Past ==
Valentin Schiedermair gave his debut at the sold-out Berlin Philharmonic Hall and has been developing his unique blend of virtuosity and insight in concerts, recitals and orchestral performances worldwide for more than 20 years. From the age of five he took piano lessons with Elizabeth Bleile in Heidelberg. At 16 he won first prize at the Leimen piano competition and played on German radio. At 17 years he studied with Paul Dan at the Music Academy Heidelberg-Mannheim and had lessons with Chopin-prizewinner Halina Czerny-Stefańska and her husband Ludwik Stefanski. At age 20 he won a prize in Barcelona and was chosen as one of two German students in the performing arts to continue his studies in New York City with scholarships from the Annette Kade Foundation and the Fulbright Commission. In New York he had lessons with Gary Graffman, Vladimir Horowitz's favourite pupil, who taught him much of the core classical and romantic repertoire. He continued his studies at the Vienna Music Academy under Hans Kann and then in London with Peter Wallfisch at the Royal College of Music. Master classes with virtuosos Shura Cherkassky, Bruno Leonardo Gelber, Mieczyslaw Horszowski and many others completed his studies. He is now in demand for master classes in Europe and Asia where he passes on the musical tradition he experienced first hand. Recent masterclasses have taken place at the Nanyang Academy of Fine Arts in Singapore, Shenzhen University in China, the National Chiayi University in Taiwan, the Chinese Culture University and Aletheia University in Taipei as well as the Guildhall School of Music in London and the Mannheim Music Academy in Germany. His CDs 'The Romantic Spirit' and 'Poetry & Passion' with live recordings from his tours in Asia have been broadcast worldwide.

== Present ==
Valentin Schiedermair's solo tours of China, Taiwan and Singapore drew enthusiastic audiences in fifteen major cities. For the second year running the final concert in Taipei finished only after five encores and the University of Shenzhen awarded him a guest professorship in recognition of his contribution to the musical exchange between China and Germany. In 2012 he performed for German National Day at the parliament building in Bonn. He has performed the complete piano sonatas of Wolfgang Amadeus Mozart, Ludwig van Beethoven and Franz Schubert as well as the 48 Preludes & Fugues of Johann Sebastian Bach's Well Tempered Clavier and Bach's Goldberg Variations. His extensive repertoire also included his own compositions.

He died at the age of 58 in Chelmsford/ Essex.
