= Eduard Kunz =

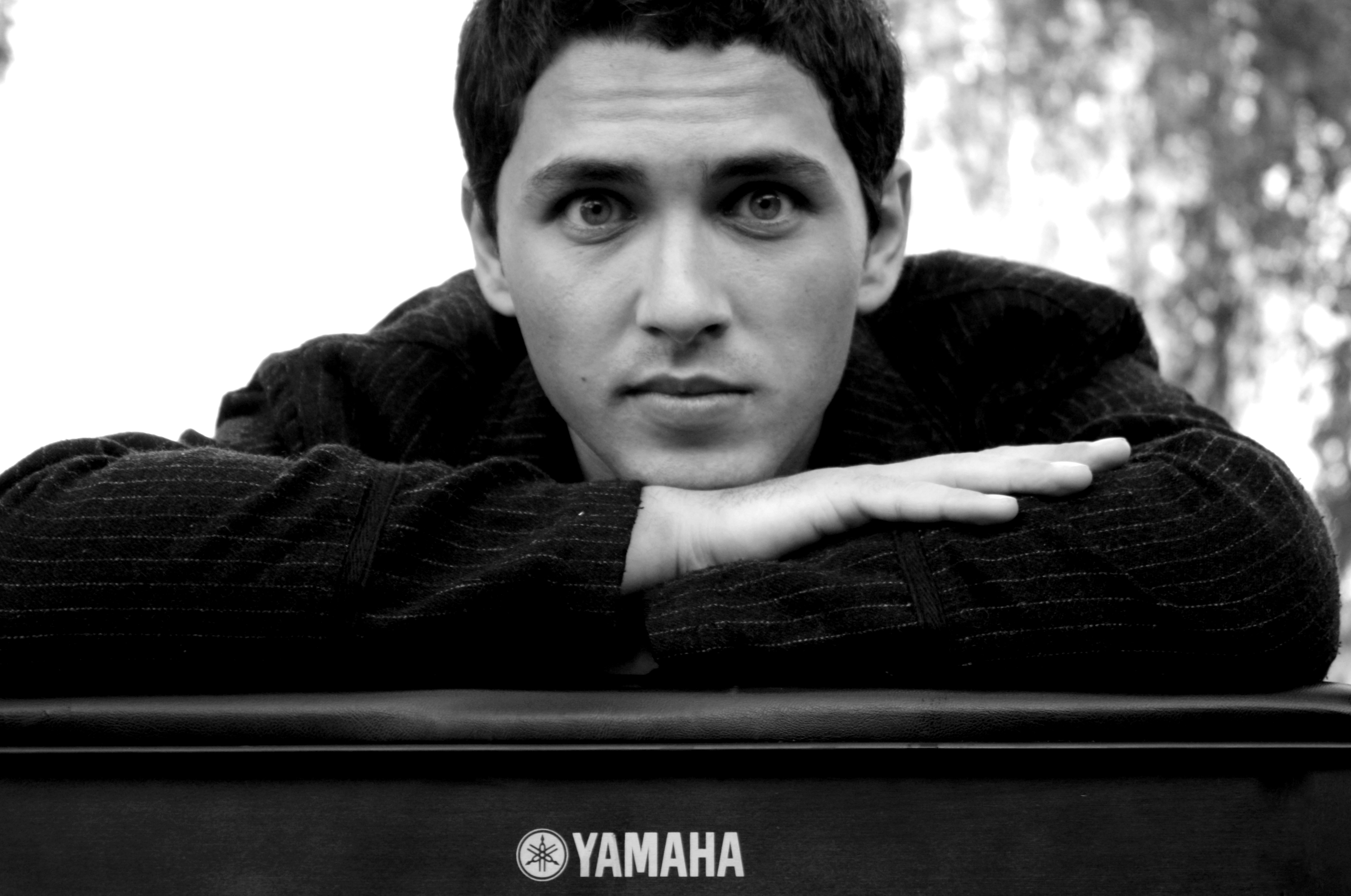
- Eduard Kunz

Background information
- Born: October 30, 1980 (age 45); Omsk, USSR
- Genres: Classical
- Occupation: Pianist
- Instrument: Piano

Eduard Kunz (Russian: Эдуард Кунц), (born October 30, 1980, in Omsk, Soviet Union) is a Russian pianist. He reached the 2nd round in the International Tchaikovsky Competition in 2011.

== Biography ==
Eduard was born in Siberia from an assimilated minority German ethnic in Russia. He studied with Michail Khokhlov at the Gnessin Special school for gifted children and with Andrei Diev at the Moscow Tchaikovsky Conservatory. He made his debut with the Omsk Philharmonic Orchestra at the age of 10. He gained a Postgraduate Diploma with Distinction as well as the Gold Medal for performance from the Royal Northern College of Music studying with Norma Fisher and the late Mark Ray.

Named among 10 tomorrow's great pianists by the BBC Music Magazine, Eduard Kunz has performed and broadcast with many major orchestras in the UK including the BBC Symphony, BBC Concert, and BBC Scottish Symphony orchestras, the Royal Scottish National Orchestra, Hallé, Ulster Orchestra, City of Birmingham Symphony Orchestra, Welsh National Opera Orchestra, Royal Liverpool Philharmonic and London Musici orchestras, with conductors such as Tugan Sokhiev, Christian Mandeal, Edward Gardner, Gerard Schwarz, Lothar Koenigs, Garry Walker, Clark Rundell, Mark Stephenson, Alejandro Posada, Josep Caballe Domenech, Alexander Joel, Andrés Orozco-Estrada, Barry Wordsworth and David Angus, amongst others.

Other important debuts included Deutsches Symphonie-Orchester Berlin at the Berlin Philharmonie, The Philharmonia Orchestra at the Royal Albert Hall, Royal Stockholm Philharmonic Orchestra, Orquesta Sinfónica de Castilla y León, Orkest van het Oosten, Orchestre national du Capitole de Toulouse and Braunschweig Symphony orchestras as well as recitals at the Wigmore Hall in London, Bridgewater Hall in Manchester, Louvre in Paris, Concertgebouw in Amsterdam and Winterthur Hall in Barcelona, amongst many others. Recordings for classical radio stations include BBC Radio 3, Radio France and Deutschlandradio Kultur amongst many others.

Eduard is a winner of thirteen first prizes of international piano competitions including First Prize of George Enescu Competition in Bucharest and Gold Medals of the New Orleans and International Paderewski Piano Competition in Bydgoszcz.

Other awards included Silver medal from The Worshipful Company of Musicians in London, awards from Hattori and Musical Foundation, Dame Myra Hess and Yamaha Music Foundation of Europe as well as Spivakov Foundation and “Richter” award from Rostropovich Foundation in Moscow. In the 2011, he reached the 2nd round in the International Tchaikovsky Competition.

Eduard's stage partners include Yulian Rachlin, Patricia Kopachinskaya, Sol Gabetta, Vilde Frang, Boris Andrianov, Aleksandr Ghindin and Yuriy Medyanik. Eduard's performances were recorded by all major European stations including BBC Radio 3, Radio France and Deutsche Radio Kultur and Russian Orpheus. Eduard radio recordings include Piano Concerto No. 10 (Mozart) with BBC Scottish Orchestra, Piano Concerto No. 3 (Beethoven) and Piano Concerto No. 1(Tchaikovsky) with Ulster Orchestra Northern Ireland, Piano Concerto No. 2 (Rachmaninoff) with BBC Concert Orchestra, Schumann and Dmitri Shostakovich concertos with WNO and the Rhapsody on a Theme of Paganini by Sergei Rachmaninoff with BBC Symphony Orchestra, as well as a recording with Alexandru Tomescu of complete repertoire for violin and piano by George Enescu.

Eduard is the co-founder of Kunz Piano Academy in Brașov, Romania, where he invites young artists from all around the world twice a year for a week of public masterclasses. In 2020, the academy will have its 4th edition.

Eduard is a Moscow Philharmonic Society Artist, Verbier Festival laureate, a former BBC Radio 3 New Generation Artist (2006–2008) and a Yamaha Artist.

He is featured in the 2010 film A Surprise in Texas about the 2009 Van Cliburn Foundation competition.

== Awards and Competitions ==
Year	Award
1997	(Russia) Spivakov Foundation Award
2002	(Russia) Richter Award, Rostropovich Foundation
2004	(Scotland) Erik Chisholm Memorial Prize
2004	(United Kingdom) Royal Northern College of Music's Gold Medal
2004	(United Kingdom) Dame Myra Hess Award
2004	(United Kingdom) Worshipful Company of Musicians Silver Medal
2005	(United Kingdom) Yamaha Music Foundation Award
2005	(United Kingdom) Hattori Foundation Award
2006	(United Kingdom) MIFCO Award
2006	(United Kingdom) BBC Radio 3 New Generation Artist
2007	(Switzerland) Verbier Festival laureate

Year	Competition	Prize
2000	(Russia) III Sabitov International Piano Competition	1st prize
2001	(Ukraine) IV Horowitz International Piano Competition	3rd prize
2002	(North Macedonia) III Bitola International Music Competition	1st prize
2002	(Netherlands) II Enschede International Piano Competition	1st prize
2002	(Greece) Grand Konzerteum International Piano Competition	1st prize
2005	(United Kingdom) Dudley International piano Competition	1st prize
2005	(United Kingdom) Bromsgrove International musicians Competition	1st prize
2005	(United Kingdom) Manchester Piano Award	1st prize
2007	(Romania) XVIII George Enescu International Competition	1st prize
2007	(Italy) XIII Città di Sulmona International Piano Competition	1st prize
2007	(Italy) VIII Vietri sul Mare International Piano Competition	Winner
2007	VIII Premi Principat d'Andorra	1st prize
2008	(Italy) Pinerolo International Piano Competition	1st prize
2009	(United States) Van Cliburn International Piano Competition	Jury Discretionary Award
2009	(Italy) San Nicola di Bari International Piano Competition	Winner
2009	(Spain) XVII Frechilla-Zuloaga Piano Award	1st prize
2010	(United States) 22nd New Orleans International Piano Competition	1st prize
2010	(Poland) 8th Paderewski International Piano Competition	1st prize
