= Evgeni Bozhanov =

Bulgarian musician

Evgeni Bozhanov (Bulgarian: Евгени Божанов; born in Rousse, Bulgaria, on 10 March 1984) is a Bulgarian classical pianist. He trained with Evgeny Zhelyazkov at the National School of Arts "Prof. Vesselin Stoyanov" in Rousse, and from 2001 to 2006 studied with Boris Bloch at the Folkwang Hochschule in Essen. From 2006 he continued his studies with Georg Friedrich Schenck at the Robert Schumann Hochschule Düsseldorf.

== Career ==
Bozhanov's international career developed after prizes at several major piano competitions, including the Sviatoslav Richter International Piano Competition in Moscow, the Queen Elisabeth Music Competition in Brussels, the Van Cliburn International Piano Competition in Fort Worth and the International Chopin Piano Competition in Warsaw. He has appeared in recital at venues including the Musikverein in Vienna, Suntory Hall in Tokyo, the Berliner Philharmonie, Serate Musicali in Milan and the Calouste Gulbenkian Foundation in Lisbon.

He has appeared with instrumentalists including Martha Argerich, Akane Sakai, Akiko Suwanai, Emmanuel Tjeknavorian, Mincho Minchev, Young-Chang Cho, Svetlin Roussev and Xavier Phillips.

Orchestras with which he has performed include the Deutsches Symphonie-Orchester Berlin, Swedish Radio Symphony Orchestra, Orchestra del Maggio Musicale Fiorentino, Orchestra dell'Accademia Nazionale di Santa Cecilia, Royal Liverpool Philharmonic Orchestra, Philharmonia Orchestra, Houston Symphony, Stuttgart Philharmonic Orchestra, Munich Chamber Orchestra, Tonkünstler Orchestra, Belgian National Orchestra, Hyogo Performing Arts Center Orchestra, Yomiuri Nippon Symphony Orchestra and Sofia Philharmonic Orchestra.

Conductors with whom he has worked include Hubert Soudant, Yutaka Sado, Jukka-Pekka Saraste, Tugan Sokhiev, Daniele Rustioni, Marcus Bosch, Clemens Schuldt, Ola Rudner, Juraj Valčuha, Alejo Pérez, Nayden Todorov, Emil Tabakov and Cristian Mandeal.

== Competitions ==
He garnered international attention after his performances at the 2009 Thirteenth Van Cliburn International Piano Competition, the 2010 Queen Elisabeth Music Competition in Brussels and the XVI International Chopin Piano Competition in Warsaw.

In 2010, he won Second Prize at the Queen Elisabeth Piano Competition and later received Fourth Prize at the XVI International Chopin Piano Competition.

=== Prizes in international competitions ===
- 1999 International Frédéric Chopin Competition, Varna, Bulgaria – 1st prize
- 2000 Jeunesses Musicales Competition, Bucharest, Romania – 1st prize
- 2006 Carl Bechstein International Piano Competition, Essen, Germany – 1st prize
- 2008 Alessandro Casagrande International Piano Competition, Terni, Italy – 1st prize
- 2008 Sviatoslav Richter International Piano Competition, Moscow, Russia – 2nd prize (1st prize not awarded).
- 2009 Thirteenth Van Cliburn International Piano Competition, Fort Worth, Texas, United States – finalist.
- 2010 Queen Elisabeth Music Competition, Brussels, Belgium – 2nd prize.
- 2010 XVI International Chopin Piano Competition, Warsaw, Poland – 4th prize.
