= Lydia Artymiw =

American musician

- Лідія Артимів
- Born: Philadelphia, Pennsylvania, United States
- Occupations: Pianist and educator
- Notable work: Avery Fisher Career Grant winner and recipient of the Andrew Wolf Chamber Music Prize

Lydia Artymiw (Note: Ukrainian: Лідія Артимів, romanized: Lydia Artymiw) is a native of Philadelphia, Pennsylvania and an American concert pianist and Emerita Distinguished McKnight Professor of Piano in the College of Liberal Arts at the University of Minnesota.

== Early life ==
Artymiw was born in Philadelphia to Ukrainian parents and began piano studies at age four with George Oransky at the Ukrainian Music Institute. Her principal teachers were Freda Pastor Berkowitz, who also taught for over fifty years at the Curtis Institute of Music in Philadelphia, from 1962–1967 and Gary Graffman, her primary mentor, with whom she studied from 1967 to 1979. Artymiw graduated summa cum laude from the University of the Arts in Philadelphia in 1973, which honored her with a "Distinguished Alumna" award in 1991.

== Career ==
Artymiw has appeared as soloist with over 100 orchestras world-wide, including the Boston Symphony Orchestra, Cleveland Orchestra, Philadelphia Orchestra, New York Philharmonic, Minnesota Orchestra, the Los Angeles Philharmonic Orchestra at the Hollywood Bowl.

Artymiw has been successful on the international competition circuit. She won third prize in the 1978 Leeds competition (UK) and was a finalist in the 1976 Leventritt competition (USA), a year in which no first prize was given. She was also a recipient of the Avery Fisher Career Grant in 1987 and the Andrew Wolf Chamber Music Award in 1989. Artymiw has served as a competition juror for the 2022 Charles Wadsworth Piano Competition in Georgia, the 2019 First China International Competition (Beijing), the 2017 Lang Lang Futian International Piano Competition, the 2015 First Van Cliburn Junior International Piano Competition and Festival, and for the William Kapell, Esther Honens, Wisconsin PianoArts, New Jersey Symphony, Pro Musicis, the New York International, Weatherford (TX), and the Pacifica (CA) Piano Competitions. She served as a Pre-Screening juror for the 2022 Van Cliburn International Piano Competition and the 2023 Van Cliburn Junior International Piano Competition & Festival.

In 2024 she was a juror at the OSM (Montréal International Piano Competition) and for the Gina Bachauer International Piano Competition in Utah. She has also been on the juries for 22 piano concerto competitions at Juilliard, several at the Manhattan School, as well as Juilliard's Bachauer and Nordmann Fellowship Competitions.

Artymiw is Emerita Distinguished McKnight Professor of Piano at the University of Minnesota where she was on the faculty from 1989-2020. In 2000, she received the Dean's Medal at the College of Liberal Arts at the University of Minnesota. In 2015, Artymiw was awarded the 2015 Outstanding Contributions to Postbaccalaureate, Graduate, and Professional Education Prize by the Board of Regents. From 2015-2019, Artymiw served as a guest piano faculty member at Juilliard. She presented piano master classes at both Juilliard and Curtis in 2016 as well as for the Manhattan School in 2021.

She has recorded for Chandos, Centaur, Pantheon, Artegra, and Bridge. Her recordings have received awards from Gramophone (Best of the Year) and Ovation (Best of the Month), and she was nominated for a 2019 Grammy Award with cellist Marcy Rosen for their Bridge CD of "The Complete Cello/Piano Works of Felix Mendelssohn." Her Chandos CD of Tchaikovsky's "The Seasons" sold over 20,000 copies and is still in print. She has been a Steinway artist since 1973.
