= Sung-Won Yang =

South Korean cellist

- Occupation: Cellist

Korean name
- Hangul: 양성원
- RR: Yang Seongwon
- MR: Yang Sŏngwŏn

Sung-Won Yang is a South Korean cellist who performs worldwide as a soloist and as a chamber musician. He studied with Philippe Muller and Janos Starker, and graduated from the Conservatoire National Supérieur de Musique de Paris.

He has collaborated with many musicians such as Christoph Eschenbach, MyungWhun Chung, Peter Eötvös, Johannes Kalitzke, Laurent Petitgirard, and Pascal Devoyon.

Since 2009, he is a founding member of the Trio Owon with violinist Olivier Charlier and pianist Emmanuel Strosser.

He is also a regular concert and recording partner of pianist Enrico Pace, with whom he has recorded the complete cello/piano sonatas of Beethoven, Schumann, and Brahms.

His all-Kodály debut album was chosen as Editor's Choice of the month by Gramophone Magazine (2003) and a Critic's Choice of the year by Gramophone (2003). He has also recorded works by Rachmaninoff, Chopin and Liszt, Bach, Beethoven, Dvorák, Elgar and Schumann for EMI and Universal Music / Decca.

In 2010 he recorded the Dvořák Cello Concerto with the Czech Philharmonic Orchestra conducted by Znedek Macal.

In 2017 he recorded the Bach Cello Suites.

He has served as a juror at the Banff International Chamber Music Competition in Canada, the André Navarra International Cello Competition in France, the Cassado International Cello Competition in Japan and the Tongyeong International Competition in Korea

He is currently a professor of cello at Yonsei University School of Music in Seoul, visiting professor in Residence at the Royal Academy of Music in London.

Yang is also the artistic Director of the Festival Beethoven à Beaune, in France, and of Music in PyeongChang Festival.

He is recipient of Chevalier des Arts et des Lettres by the French government.

== Discography ==
- 2002 : Kodály - Music For Cello And Piano. With Ick-Choo Moon (piano). Editor's Choice of the month by Gramophone Magazine (2003) and a Critic's Choice of the year by Gramophone (2003).
- 2010 : Dvořák - Cello Concerto / Piano Trio "Dumky". With the Czech Philharmonic Orchestra (Conductor : Znedek Macal)
- 2011 : Musical Getaway. With Les Bons Becs
- 2017 : J.S.Bach - Cello Suites

With Enrico Pace

- 2014 : Brahms Schumann - Complete Works For Cello And Piano. With Enrico Pace (piano)
- 2018 : Franz Liszt & Frédéric Chopin - Cantique d'Amour. With Enrico Pace (piano)
- 2022 : Beethoven - Complete Works For Cello And Piano. With Enrico Pace (piano)

With Trio Owon

- 2010 : Schubert – sonate pour violoncelle et piano ‘arpeggione’ et trio en mi bémol majeur op. 100
- 2011 : Schubert, Dvorák - Piano Trios
- 2013 : Beethoven - Piano Trio Op.97 ‘Archduke’ - Piano Trio In E Flat Major Op.70
- 2015 : complete Beethoven trio
- 2016 : Olivier Messiaen, Quatuor pour la fin du temps - Gounod, L’anniversaire Des Martyrs / Chant pour le départ des missionnaires.
