= Andrei Diev =

Russian pianist (born 1958)

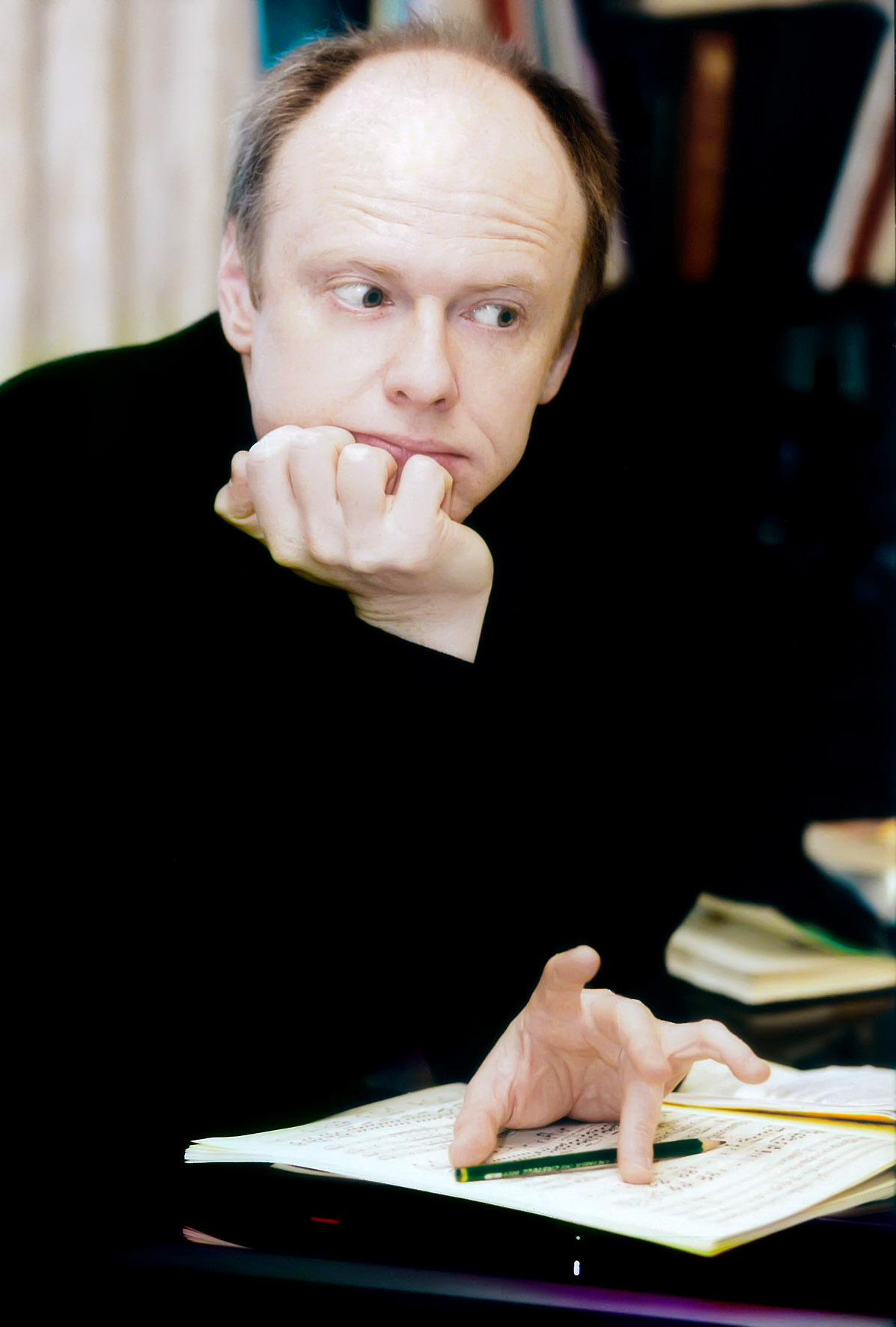
- Born: 7 July 1958 (age 67); Minsk, USSR
- Occupations: Classical pianist, professor
- Awards: Meritorious Artist

Andrei Borisovich Diev (Russian: Андрей Борисович Диев), born on 7 July 1958 in Minsk, BSSR (now Belarus), is a Russian pianist, Meritorious Artist (1995) and professor of the Moscow Conservatory.

== Biography ==
Diev's mother was a pianist and his father was a conductor, both having graduated from the Moscow Conservatory. Diev began his piano studies with his grandmother and formally studied music at Gnessin State Musical College in 1965. He later transferred to the Moscow Central Music School of the Moscow Conservatory in 1973 to study with Lev Naumov and continued his studies with Naumov when he entered the Moscow Conservatory in 1975, graduating in 1981.

Diev has been teaching at the Moscow Conservatory as Naumov's assistant since 1988. He is also a professor at the International High School and gives masterclasses at the Moscow Conservatory, the Royal College of Music, and throughout Russia, Japan, Italy, and other countries. His students include Andrei Korobeinikov, Eduard Kunz, Pavel Dombrovsky, Dmitry Onishenko, and Ilya Ramlav.

His discography includes complete recordings of Rachmaninov's 24 preludes, Debussy's 24 preludes and Scriabin's 90 preludes for BMG. He has also recorded works by Mozart and Prokofiev for Supraphon (including Prokofiev's Piano Concerto no. 2), works by Messiaen for Fontec and by Roslavetz for Russian Seasons/Chant du Monde.
