= Di Wu (pianist) =

Di Wu 吳迪
- Born: Di Wu 吳迪
- Origin: Nanjing, Jiangsu, China
- Genre: Classical
- Occupation: Pianist
- Instrument: Piano
- Years active: 1990s-present

Di Wu (Chinese: 吳迪) is a Chinese-American pianist.

== Early life and education ==
Born into a musical family in Nanjing, Jiangsu, Di Wu entered Beijing's Central Conservatory of Music at age 12. She made her professional debut at age 14 with the Beijing Philharmonic, and thereafter toured widely to positive reviews. In 1999, Wu came to the United States to continue her music studies, first with Zenon Fishbein at the Manhattan School of Music, then with Gary Graffman at the Curtis Institute of Music in Philadelphia from 2000 to 2005. Wu earned a Master of Music degree at The Juilliard School under Yoheved Kaplinsky, and in 2009, she received an Artist Diploma under the guidance of Joseph Kalichstein and Robert McDonald.

== Performances ==
Wu has toured widely in Asia, Europe and the United States, where she has performed with prominent musicians such as Christoph Eschenbach and the Curtis Symphony Orchestra; Charles Dutoit and the Philadelphia Orchestra; James Conlon and the Cincinnati Symphony Orchestra; Miguel Harth-Bedoya and the Fort Worth Symphony Orchestra; and Simone Young and the Philharmoniker Hamburg. Other orchestral engagements have included appearances with Washington's National Symphony Orchestra, the Pittsburgh Symphony Orchestra, the New Jersey Symphony Orchestra, and twice in Carnegie Hall with The New York Pops.

Wu has also played as a recitalist: She made her solo debut in Weill Recital Hall at Carnegie Hall in 2005, and has performed at the Ravinia Festival and the International Keyboard Institute & Festival, as well as the Alice Tully Hall, Cleveland Play House (in the Cleveland International Piano Competition), the New Jersey Performing Arts Center, the Bass Performance Hall in Texas, and more. In Europe, she has presented recitals at festivals such as Mozart Gesellschaft Dortmund, Klavier Festival Ruhr, and the Busoni International Piano Festival, and at venues such as the Musee de Grenoble and Musée d'Orsay in Paris.

== Critical reception ==
In 2009 she was praised in The Wall Street Journal as the "most musically mature and sensitive pianist competing in the finals" in the 13th Van Cliburn International Piano Competition, and the one who should have received the Gold Medal. In Washington, D.C., she was hailed for her "fire and authority"; in Philadelphia, for her "charisma, steely technique and keen musical intelligence"; and in San Francisco, where the San Francisco Classical Voice critic wrote, "what distinguishes Di Wu from her contemporaries is the level of musical maturity she possesses, her exacting attention to details, and the way she opens her vision of the world to the audience. The sensitivity she possesses and the loving care she lavishes on the most minute details of the music is nothing short of phenomenal".

In 2011, Wu impressed critics in a performance in Seattle, as a late substitute for ailing pianist Michael Brown. The Seattle Times critic wrote of Wu's performance:

Wu has a clearly major future. In "Une Barque sur l'océan," she achieved a texturally intricate meshing of lines to recall some of those fabled Vladimir Horowitz performances that one felt could only have been the product of at least three hands. Lambent tone, quicksilver finger-work, expert pedal control and eloquent phrasing came together to make this as fine a reading of the piece as I can remember hearing, and then, in "Alborada del gracioso," Wu added propulsive rhythms and some stunning repeated-note execution to the already dazzling mix.

Wu's recording of Brahms's Variations on a Theme of Paganini, Books I and II received praise from Musical America's Harris Goldsmith, who wrote, "Her account of the Brahms is amazing. She takes all the difficult options (her glissandos are unbelievable!), and she conjures from the piano absolutely gossamer, violinistic textures, joyous humor, and brilliant air-borne tempos".

== Competitions ==
Winner of multiple awards, including, in 2009 alone, a coveted prize at the Thirteenth Van Cliburn International Piano Competition; The Juilliard School’s Petschek Award; and the Vendome Virtuosi prize at Lisbon’s prestigious Vendome Competition. Other competition credits include winner of the Astral 2007 National Audition, first prize at the 2005 Hilton Head International Piano Competition and the 2000 Missouri Southern International Piano Competition, for which she was invited back for a worldwide broadcast encore recital in 2001.

== Attribution ==
Some material on this page is derived from the Biography of Di Wu, on the subject's website, used with permission of the author.
