= Inna Heifetz =

Ukrainian pianist

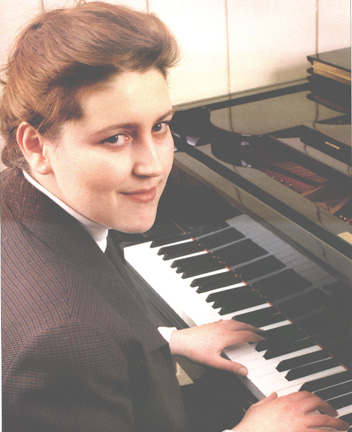
- Inna Heifetz
- Occupation: Classical pianist

Inna Heifetz (born 1961) is a classical pianist.

Heifetz was born in Odesa, Ukraine, and first performed in public at the age of six. Recital and concert tours have taken her to Italy, Austria, Switzerland, Germany and France. She has played many concerts in the United States, and has appeared as soloist with Ricercata de Paris, Musica Viva, the Liederkranz Orchestra of New York, the Liszt Festival Symphony Orchestra, the Boston University Symphony Orchestra, and others. Heifetz has won the First Prize in the Liederkranz Foundation Competition in New York, the First Prize in the Aaron Richmond Piano Competition in Boston, the Marie Baier Foundation Award and the gold medal in the Tape Recording Competition of the Piano Teachers Guild in New York.

Heifetz studied at the famous Stolyarsky School in Odesa, the New England Conservatory in Boston and Boston University. She attended Tanglewood Institute where she was given the most promising performer award. Her teachers included Oxana Yablonskaya, Gary Graffman and Russell Sherman.

Heifetz records for Sonora Productions. Of her debut recording, of Lizst's Consolations, Mephisto Waltz No. 1, Hungarian Rhapsodies Nos. 6 and 12, Polish Songs Nos. 1-6, and Rigoletto Paraphrase, Donald Manildi wrote that Heifetz "offers earnest, well-schooled performances that may attract those who prefer a clear, ungimmicked treatment of Liszt's piano music."
