= Roberto Plano =

Italian pianist

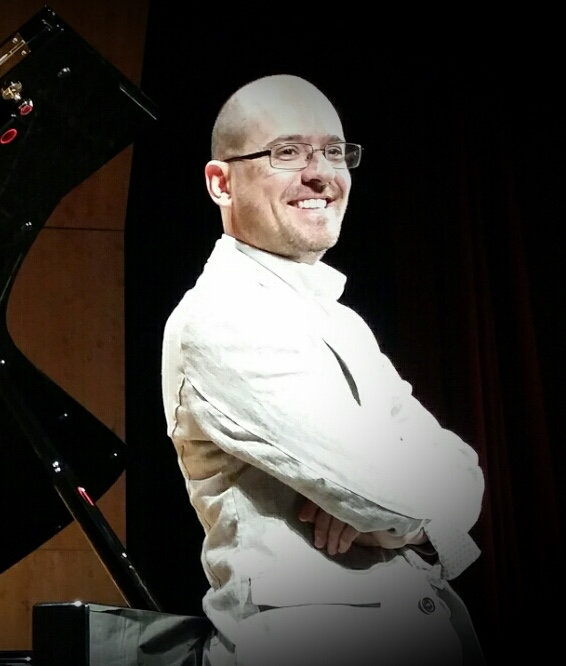
Roberto Plano in 2015

Roberto Plano (born 1 August 1978 in Varese) is an Italian pianist, winner of the Cleveland International Piano Competition (2001) and laureate at numerous international competitions such as the Sendai International Music Competition, the Honens International Piano Competition, Twelfth Van Cliburn International Piano Competition, The American Prize, Valencia International Piano Competition Prize Iturbi and the Concours Géza Anda.

== Discography ==
- Inspiration, Roberto Plano & Paolo Paliaga (2017, Da Vinci Classics)
- Franz Liszt, Harmonies poétiques et religieuses (28–30 September 2015, 2CD Decca 481 2479) OCLC 980739412
- Giovanni Sgambati, Quintets with piano and string quartets - Noferini Quartet (26–28 October 2013, Brilliant Classics 94813) OCLC 973708770
- Bedřich Smetana, Feuilles d'album and other pieces for piano (1–3 March 2013, Brilliant Classics 94788) OCLC 876300420
- Andrea Luchesi, Concertos pour piano - Roberto Plano, piano; Orchestre Ferruccio Busoni, dir. Massimo Belli, (4–5 February 2013, Concerto Classics) OCLC 869432188
- Andrea Luchesi, 3 Sonatas for piano and 2 Rondos (2012, Concerto Classics) OCLC 808679855
- Andrea Luchesi, 6 Sonatas for piano, Op. 1 (21–22 November 2012, Amadeus July 2013) OCLC 891160811
- Franz Liszt, Tre sonetti del Petrarca, due ballate, due leggende (2003, Azica Records ACD71222) OCLC 53403743
- Frédéric Chopin, Nocturnes Op. 27; Franz Liszt, Polonaise n°2, Sposalizio, Sonetto del Petrarca n°104, Parafrasi sul Rigoletto; Alexander Scriabin, Sonata-Fantasia n°2 Op. 19 (Sipario Dischi CG109C)
