= Funérailles =

Piano piece by Franz Liszt

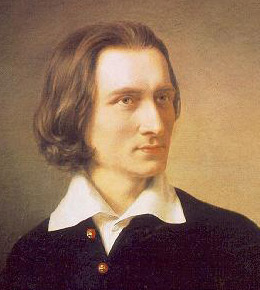
Liszt in 1842

Funerailles
Performed by Jorge Bolet
Everest Records (1960): A Liszt Recital: Jorge Bolet Pianist, Sonata in B Minor, Funerailles, and Mephisto Waltz

Funérailles is the 7th and one of the most famous pieces in Harmonies poétiques et religieuses (Poetic and Religious Harmonies), a collection of piano pieces by Franz Liszt. It was an elegy written in October 1849 in response to the crushing of the Hungarian Revolution of 1848 by the Habsburgs.

Funérailles has been recorded by pianists such as György Cziffra, Claudio Arrau, Vladimir Horowitz, Arthur Rubinstein, John Ogdon, Martha Argerich, Evgeny Kissin, Sviatoslav Richter, Arnaldo Cohen, Arcadi Volodos, Sergio Fiorentino, Awadagin Pratt and Krystian Zimerman. The work was recorded on 19th century pianos by Andrea Bonatta, Claire Chevallier, Yves Henry, Ray Dudley, Pascal Mantin, Alexei Orlowetsky and Patrick Scheyder.

== Composition ==
The piece is composed of four distinct sections, with three main themes repeating throughout. The first section, labeled "Introduzione," is a dark and gloomy adagio movement whose opening bars evoke the sound of muffled bells from across a dreary battlefield. Its forlorn right-hand chords are offset by thundering, sforzando left-hand tremolos, which are interrupted and calmed into submission by the sudden call of battle trumpets, leading into the piece's next theme.

In its second section, the piece presents a somber F-minor funeral march that modulates into a stunning lagrimoso A♭-major melody, relying heavily on augmented fifths to convey what can be viewed as a sort of dismal sense of hope.

The piece then leads into a heroic, powerful warrior march, whose valiant and triumphant chords are backed by powerful cascades of ostinato octaves in the bass. This theme builds in intensity until it reaches a fortissimo peak, at which point it breaks suddenly into its conclusion.

It is in this conclusion that Liszt reintroduces each theme from the piece, beginning with the funeral march theme, this time more powerful and emphatic. He then briefly reiterates parts of the A♭-major theme before bringing back the left-hand octave-driven warrior march. However, rather than allowing this theme's intensity to take control again, he limits its duration and ends the piece with a sudden drop into quiet, open staccatissimo chords.

== History and significance ==
Funérailles is subtitled "October 1849". This has often been interpreted as a sort of funeral speech for Liszt's friend Frédéric Chopin, who died on 17 October 1849, and also due to fact that the piece's left-hand octaves are closely related to the central section of Chopin's "Heroic" Polonaise in A-flat major, Op. 53, written seven years earlier.

However, Liszt said that it was not written with Chopin in mind, but was instead meant as a tribute to three of his friends who suffered in the failed Hungarian uprising against Habsburg rule in 1848. They were Prince Felix Lichnowsky, Count László Teleki and the Hungarian Prime Minister, Count Lajos Batthyány. Batthyány was executed on 6 October 1849 for his part in the uprising, Lichnowsky was beaten to death by an angry mob, and Teleki was forced to live in exile for more than ten years.
