= Georg Friedrich Schenck =

German musician

Georg Friedrich Schenck (born 1953) is a German musician.

Schenk was born in Aachen, Germany. Graduating from Hanover Music College (student of Bernhard Ebert), he took masterclasses with Claudio Arrau, and then was a student of the American pianist Andre Watts for many years.

In 1986, Schenck was appointed Professor of Piano in the Robert Schumann Hochschule in Düsseldorf. As a performer, Schenck has a wide repertoire. In 1987–88, he recorded the complete Beethoven’s piano sonatas and published recordings of Hindemith’s piano music, as well making a prize-winning recording of Brahms' piano transcriptions. Contemporary composer Adriana Hölszky dedicated to him a work entitled Hearing Window for Franz Liszt, which was first performed in Frankfurt in 1989.

Among his past students is Bulgarian pianist Evgeni Bozhanov.
