= Totentanz (Liszt) =

Composition for piano and orchestra by Franz Liszt

Totentanz
Performed by Neal O'Doan with orchestra

Totentanz (English: Dance of the Dead): Paraphrase on Dies irae, S.126, is the name of a work for solo piano and orchestra by Franz Liszt notable for being based on the Gregorian plainchant melody Dies irae as well as for stylistic innovations. It was first planned in 1838, completed and published in 1849, and revised in 1853 and 1859.

== Obsession with death ==
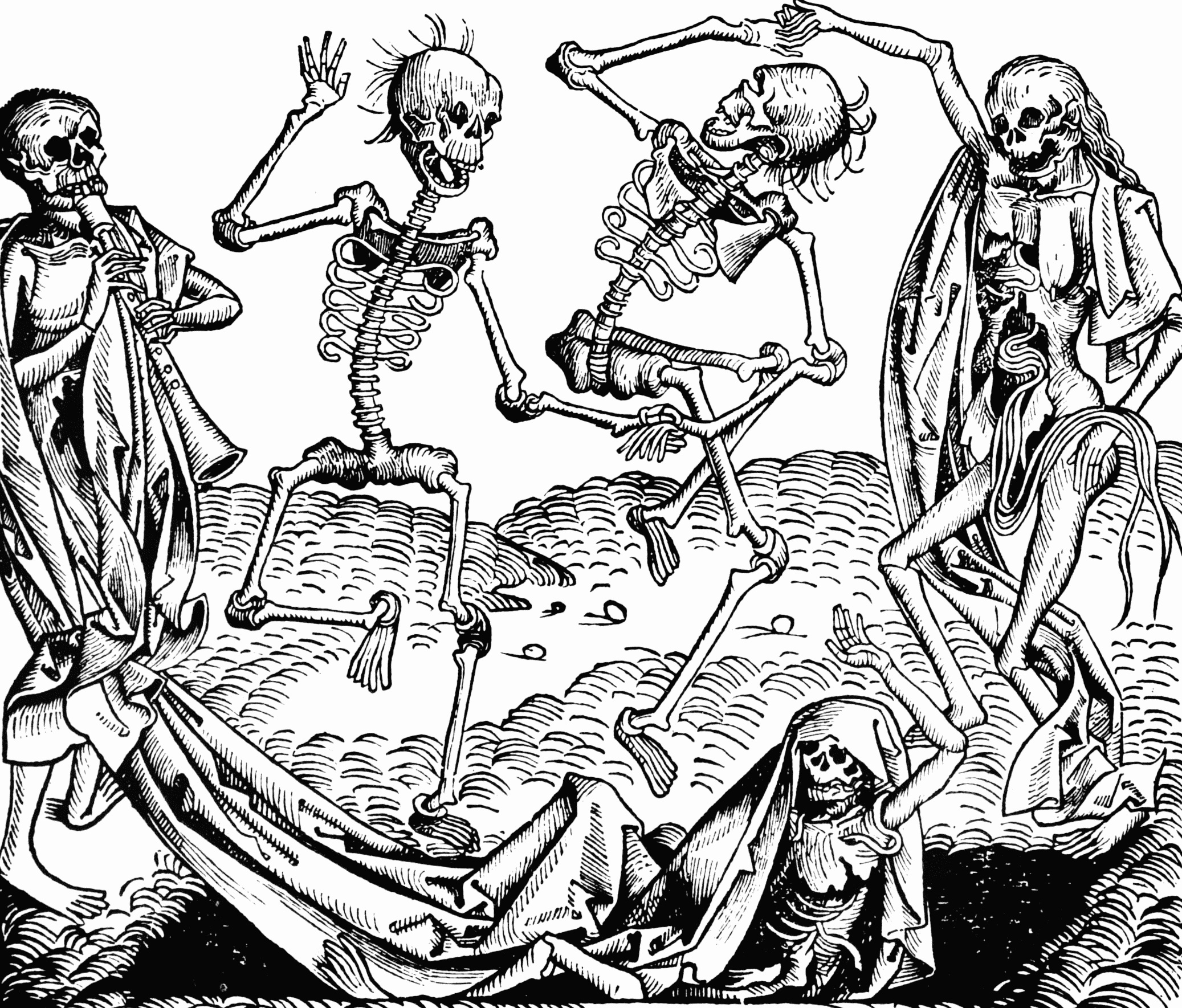
The Dance of Death (Totentanz) from Liber Chronicarum [Nuremberg Chronicle], 1493, attr. to Michael Wolgemut

Some of the titles of Liszt’s pieces, such as Totentanz, Funérailles, La lugubre gondola and Pensée des morts, show the composer's fascination with death. In the young Liszt we can already observe manifestations of his obsession with death, with religion, and with heaven and hell. According to Alan Walker, Liszt frequented Parisian "hospitals, gambling casinos and asylums" in the early 1830s, and he even went down into prison dungeons in order to see those condemned to die.

== Sources of inspiration ==
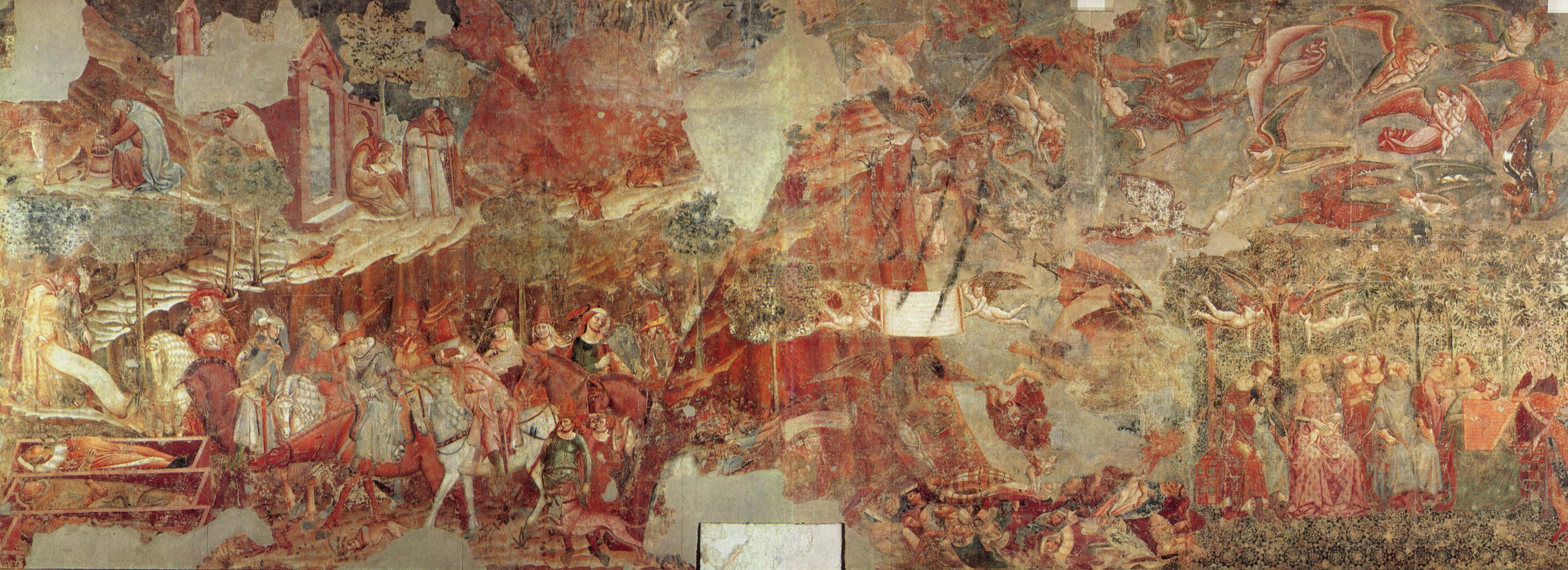
The Triumph of Death, c. 1355

In the Romantic age, due to a fascination with everything Medieval, the aspect of fantastic or grotesquely macabre irony often replaced the original moral intent. A musical example of such irony can be found in the last movement of the Symphonie fantastique by Hector Berlioz which quotes the medieval (Gregorian) Dies Irae (Day of Judgment) melody in a shockingly modernistic manner. In 1830 Liszt attended the first performance of the symphony and was struck by its powerful originality. Liszt's Totentanz (Dance of Death), a set of variations for piano and orchestra, also paraphrases the Dies Irae plainsong.

Another source of inspiration for the young Liszt was the famous fresco "Triumph of Death" by Francesco Traini (at Liszt's time attributed to Andrea Orcagna and today also to Buonamico Buffalmacco) in the Campo Santo, Pisa. Liszt had eloped to Italy with his mistress, the Countess d’Agoult, and in 1838 he visited Pisa. Only ten years later, Liszt's first sketches materialized into a complete version of his Totentanz. Revisions followed in 1853 and 1859, and its final form was first performed at The Hague on 15 April 1865 by Liszt's student Hans von Bülow, to whom the work is dedicated.

== Stylistic innovations ==
Opening measures

Since it is based on Gregorian material, Liszt's Totentanz contains Medieval sounding passages with canonic counterpoint, but by far the most innovative aspect of the scoring is the shockingly modernistic, even percussive, nature of the piano part. The opening comes surprisingly close to the introduction in Bartók's Sonata for Two Pianos and Percussion, a work composed almost a hundred years later. This may be no coincidence since Bartók frequently performed Liszt's Totentanz. Other modernistic features are the toccata like sections where the pianist's repeated notes beat with diabolic intensity and special sound effects in the orchestra—for example, the col legno in the strings sound like shuddering or clanking bones. Richard Pohl (an early biographer) notes, "Every variation discloses some new character—the earnest man, the flighty youth, the scornful doubter, the prayerful monk, the daring soldier, the tender maiden, the playful child."

== Extant versions ==
Like most Liszt pieces, a number of versions exist. Next to Liszt's first version of the Totentanz a second De Profundis version was prepared from Liszt's manuscript sources by Ferruccio Busoni (1919). The standard version is the final and third version of the piece (1859). Liszt also wrote versions for two pianos (S.652) and solo piano (S.525). Edited by Emil von Sauer, the original edition for two pianos, however, merely incorporated the solo part of Liszt's rendering for piano and orchestra, with a transcription of the orchestral accompaniment in the second piano. Dr. Andrey Kasparov has since re-imagined this setting as a work for piano duo. It shows to great effect the breadth of the Totentanz, when distributed evenly between two performers.

Stephen Tharp has transcribed the work for solo organ.

== Notable performers ==
Besides the performances by Hans von Bülow, Béla Bartók, Sergei Rachmaninoff and Ferruccio Busoni, performances of historic significance include those of the Liszt student José Vianna da Motta (1945 – Port Nat S IPL 108), as well as György Cziffra (EMI 74012 2), Claudio Arrau, Jorge Bolet (Decca), Arturo Benedetti Michelangeli (1961 – Arkadia HP 507.1; 1962 – Memoria 999-001), Michel Béroff (EMI Classics), Byron Janis (RCA), Martha Argerich, Krystian Zimerman (Deutsche Grammophon), Arnaldo Cohen (Naxos and BIS), Raymond Lewenthal, and Enrico Pace at the Second International Franz Liszt Piano Competition in 1989.
