= Gary Graffman =

American musician (1928–2025)

- .Graffman, in c. 1988
- Born: October 14, 1928; New York City, U.S.
- Died: December 27, 2025 (aged 97); New York City, U.S.
- Education: Curtis Institute of Music; Columbia University
- Occupations: Classical pianist; Academic teacher; Music administrator
- Organizations: Curtis Institute of Music

Gary Graffman (October 14, 1928 – December 27, 2025) was an American classical pianist, teacher and administrator. After he lost control of his right hand, he gave the UK premiere of Korngold's Piano Concerto for the left hand in 1985, and had seven left-hand works commissioned for him. He became a teacher, and later director and president, of the Curtis Institute of Music in Philadelphia where he had studied as a boy.

== Life and career ==
Graffman was born in New York City on October 14, 1928, to Russian-Jewish parents. Having started piano at age 3, Graffman entered the Curtis Institute of Music at age 7 in 1936 as a piano student of Isabelle Vengerova. After graduating from Curtis in 1946, he made his professional solo debut with conductor Eugene Ormandy and the Philadelphia Orchestra. From 1946 to 1948, he studied at Columbia University. In 1949, Graffman won the Leventritt Competition. He then furthered his piano studies with Rudolf Serkin at the Marlboro Music Festival and informally with Vladimir Horowitz. In 1954, he returned to Columbia to perform Edward MacDowell's Piano Concerto No. 2 conducted by Leopold Stokowski at the university's bicentennial concert.

=== Pianist ===
Upon graduation, Graffman played with numerous orchestras and performed concerts and recitals internationally. Over the next three decades, he toured and recorded extensively, performing solo and with orchestras around the globe. He revived the Tchaikovsky 2nd and 3rd Piano Concertos, recorded by CBS with Eugene Ormandy and the Philadelphia Orchestra, and several of his students play these works. In 1964, he recorded Rachmaninoff's Rhapsody on a Theme of Paganini with Leonard Bernstein conducting the New York Philharmonic. He also made a classic recording of Prokofiev's Third Piano Concerto with George Szell and the Cleveland Orchestra in 1966; it was reissued on CD as part of Sony Classical's "Great Performances" series in 2006. In the 1970s, Graffman appeared with the Guarneri Quartet and the Juilliard String Quartet in performances of chamber music.

Probably Graffman's best-known recorded performance was for the soundtrack of the 1979 Woody Allen movie Manhattan in which he played Gershwin's Rhapsody in Blue, accompanied by the New York Philharmonic.

==== Injury, teaching ====
In 1977, he sprained the ring finger of his right hand. Because of this injury, he began re-fingering some passages for that hand in such a way as to avoid using the affected finger. This altered technique appeared to aggravate the problem, ultimately forcing him to stop performing with his right hand altogether by around 1979. Thereafter, Graffman pursued his other interests such as writing, photography, and Oriental art. In 1980, he joined the faculty at the Curtis Institute of Music, where his career had begun. He took over as the school's director in 1986, and added the title of President in 1995, serving in both capacities until 2006, when he retired. Curtis has since been criticized for failing to protect minor students from sexual abuse by a faculty member under his leadership.

Graffman's finger sprain may have been a trigger for focal dystonia, a neurological disorder that causes loss of function and uncontrollable curling in the fingers. The pianist Leon Fleisher, a close friend of Graffman, also had the disorder.

=== Later career ===
In 1981, Graffman published a memoir, I Really Should Be Practicing.

In 1985, he gave the UK premiere of Korngold's Piano Concerto for the left hand, a work that Paul Wittgenstein had commissioned in the 1920s. Seven left-hand works have been commissioned for Graffman. In 1993, for example, he performed the world premiere of Ned Rorem's Piano Concerto No. 4, written specifically for the left hand, and in 2001 he premiered Daron Hagen's concerto Seven Last Words. The American composer William Bolcom composed Gaea, a concerto for two pianos left-hand for Graffman and Leon Fleisher. It received its first performance in Baltimore in April 1996.

=== Personal life ===
Graffman was married to Naomi Helfman, who died in 2019.

Graffman died in his New York City home on December 27, 2025, at the age of 97. An obituary was published in The New York Times.

== Honors ==
Graffman received honorary doctoral degrees (including from the Juilliard School, University of Pennsylvania, and Trinity College), was honored by the cities of Philadelphia and New York, and received the Governor's Arts Award by the Commonwealth of Pennsylvania. His students included Lydia Artymiw, Lang Lang, Yuja Wang, Hilary Hahn, Teo Gheorghiu, Vitalij Kuprij, Stewart Goodyear, Claire Huangci, Daniel Hsu, Inna Heifetz, Valentin Schiedermair, Kuok-Wai Lio, Szuyu Su, Ignat Solzhenitsyn, Di Wu, and Haochen Zhang.
