= Alena Baeva =

Luxembourgisch violinist

Alena Mikhailovna Baeva (born 1985) (Russian: Алёна Михайловна Баева) is a Kirghiz Soviet Socialist Republic-born violinist with Slavic-Tatar ancestry, naturalised in Luxembourg.

== Life ==
Baeva took up the violin at the age of five and studied with Olga Danilova and Eduard Grach.

She performs as soloist with many of the world's leading orchestras, including the Hong Kong Philharmonic Orchestra, London Philharmonic Orchestra, and New York Philharmonic Orchestra, and with leading conductors (such as Charles Dutoit, Paavo Järvi, and Vladimir Jurowski).

Baeva's recordings include Shostakovich Violin Concerto No.2 (Arthaus Musik, 2015); Karłowicz Violin Concerto (NIFC, 2018); Schumann Violin Concerto and original (1844) version of the Mendelssohn Violin Concerto (Melodiya Records, 2020); Beethoven Violin Concerto (21 Music, 2021); Wieniawski Violin Concerto No.2 (NIFC, 2022); and works by Polish composers for violin & piano, recorded with Vadym Kholodenko (NIFC, 2021). Since 2023, Baeva records exclusively for the Alpha Classics label.

Aged 16, Baeva won the Grand Prix at the 12th International Henryk Wieniawski Competition (2001) and nine Special Prizes, including the Prize for Best Performance of a Contemporary Work.

Alena Baeva is a citizen of Luxembourg. She is married to Vadym Kholodenko and they have three children.
