= Music in PyeongChang =

South Korean classical music festival

- Genre: Classical music, chamber music
- Locations: Pyeongchang County, South Korea
- Years active: 2004–present
- Founders: Hyo Kang
- Website: www.mpyc.kr (in Korean)

Music in PyeongChang (MPyC; Korean: 평창대관령음악제), formerly Great Mountains Music Festival & School (대관령국제음악제), is one of South Korea's largest classical music festival held annually in Pyeongchang, Korea. It was launched by Professor Hyo Kang of the Juilliard School in 2004 and is currently led by its artistic director and cellist Sung-Won Yang.

== Programs ==
- Concerts
- Outreach Concerts
- Family Outreach Concerts
- MPyC Academy(Summer)
- Additional Events

== Venues ==
The main venues for the performances are Alpensia Concert Hall and Alpensia Music Tent, both located in the Alpensia Resort in Pyeongchang, Gangwon Province of Korea. Alpensia Concert Hall was built in 2010 and seats nearly 600 people, which makes it more suitable for chamber music performances. The 1000-seat Music Tent was completed in 2012. Master classes and Student Recitals are carried out in Pyeongchang Hall, located within the first floor of Alpensia Convention Center.

== Artistic Directors ==
- 2004–2010: Hyo Kang
- 2011–2017: Myung-Wha Chung & Kyung-Wha Chung
- 2018-2022 : Yeol Eum Son
- 2023-Present : Sung-Won Yang

== Themes ==
The festival is programmed around a different theme each year.

Year	English version	Korean version
2024	Ludwig!	루트비히
2023	Nature	자연
2022	MASK	마스크
2021	Alive	산
2020	Es Muss Sein!	그래야만 한다
2019	A Different Story	다른 이야기
2018	Curiosity	멈추어, 묻다
2017	Great Russian Masters	볼가강의 노래
2016	Bach, Beethoven, Brahms & Beyond	BBB자로...
2015	French Chic	프랑스 스타일
2014	O Sole mio	오 솔레미오
2013	Northern Lights	오로라의 노래
2012	Dancing through the centuries	춤에서 춤으로
2011	Illumination	빛이 되어
2010	CREATE & RECREATE	창조 그리고 재창조
2009	What's in a Name?	이름에 무슨 의미가?
2008	Music-Image-Text	음악-이미지-텍스트
2007	Visionary	비전을 가진 사람들
2006	Four Seasons of PyeongChang	평창의 사계
2005	War & Peace	전쟁과 평화
2004	Nature's Inspiration	자연의 영감

== World Premieres ==
The programs of Music in PyeongChang often feature premieres of pieces by major composers from Korea and abroad.

- 2005 Behzad Ranjbaran: Awakening
- 2005 Jin Hi Kim: One Sky
- 2006 Sukhi Kang: Pyeongchang Four Seasons for Violin solo and 14 strings
- 2007 Gordon Shi-Wen Chin: Haiku for voice and strings
- 2008 Jay Greenberg: Four Scenes
- 2012 Mikhail Fokine: Saint-Saëns - Le cygne from Le Carnival des animaux"The Dying Swan"
- 2012 Younghi Pagh-Paan: Hang-Sang V
- 2012 Younghi Pagh-Paan: Chohi and Her Imaginary Dance
- 2013 Richard Danielpour: Songs of the Wandering Darveesh
- 2013 Young Jo Lee: Mori for Cello, Daegum, and Percussion
- 2014 Jeongkyu Park: Darkness into Light
- 2015 Shinuh Lee: "Landscape" for 2 violins and viola
- 2015 Thierry Escaich: sextet
- 2016 Christopher Berg: Told Tales Sweet as Untold: Three Poems of Fernando Pessoa
- 2024 Shin Kim: Three Impromptus

== See also ==
- List of music festivals in South Korea
- List of classical music festivals
