= Vadym Kholodenko =

Ukrainian classical pianist (born 1986)

- Вадим Холоденко
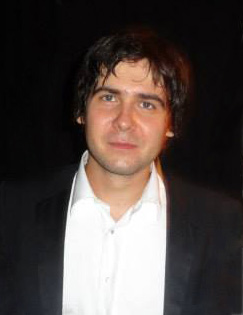
- Born: 4 September 1986 (age 40); Kyiv, Ukrainian SSR, Soviet Union
- Occupation: Classical pianist
- Children: 2 (deceased) and 3 children living
- Awards: 2013 Van Cliburn International Piano Competition: first prize
- Website: vadymkholodenko.com

Vadym Tymurovych Kholodenko (Ukrainian: Вадим Тимурович Холоденко; born 4 September 1986) is a Ukrainian pianist who won the gold medal at the Fourteenth Van Cliburn International Piano Competition.

Also taking home prizes for best performance of the piano quintet and best performance of a commissioned work, Kholodenko highlighted the final round with two concerti with the Fort Worth Symphony Orchestra, conducted by Leonard Slatkin. His cadenza in Mozart's Concerto No. 21 in C Major, K. 467, which he wrote on the plane, was praised as "fascinatingly contrapuntal", showing "the guts of a true superartist".

Kholodenko performed over 50 engagements in 2013–14 as part of his debut season as Cliburn Gold Medalist, including the Bakersfield Symphony Orchestra, the Mann Center with the Philadelphia Orchestra, La Jolla Music Society, CU Presents, Cliburn Concerts, the Krannert Center for the Performing Arts, the Lied Center of Kansas, and Portland Piano International. Also as part of his prize package, recording label harmonia mundi usa released a live CD of his award-winning Van Cliburn Competition performances on November 12, 2013, followed by a studio recording.

Kholodenko has worked with Yuri Bashmet, Vladimir Spivakov, Constantine Orbelian, Mark Gorenstein, Alexander Rudin, Dmitry Liss, Eugeny Bushkov, Alexander Sladkovsky, and other conductors, and has performed in Austria, China, the Czech Republic, Dominican Republic, Finland, France, Germany, Israel, Italy, Ireland, Japan, Lithuania, Poland, Romania, Russia, Switzerland, and the United States. He released recordings of Liszt, Rachmaninov, and Medtner on Russia's TV Culture label in 2009. An avid chamber musician, he performed and recorded a CD with violinist Alena Baeva, and formed a piano duo with Andrey Gugnin dubbed "iDuo". The duo has released a recording with Delos Records.

Kholodenko also took first prize at the Maria Callas International Piano Competition (2004), Sendai International Music Competition (2010), and the International Schubert Competition (Dortmund, 2011).

Born in Kyiv, Ukraine, Kholodenko is the first musician in his family. He made his first appearances in the United States, China, Hungary, and Croatia at the age of 13. In 2005, Kholodenko moved to Moscow to study at the Moscow Conservatory under Vera Gornostayeva.

On 17 March 2016, Kholodenko's two daughters were found dead and his estranged wife, Sofya Tsygankova, injured inside their Benbrook, Texas, home. On 21 March 2016, Tsygankova was arrested and charged with the deaths of the two children. On 16 July 2018, a judge found Tsygankova not guilty by reason of insanity and ordered her committed to a psychiatric hospital. Kholodenko is now married to the Russian violinist Alena Baeva and they have three children.

== Selected recordings ==
- Edvard Grieg, Piano Concerto in A minor, Op. 16; Camille Saint-Saëns, Piano Concerto No. 2 in G minor; Vadym Kholodenko, piano, Norwegian Radio Orchestra, conducted by Miguel Harth-Bedoya. CD Harmonia Mundi 2016
