= Van Cliburn Foundation =

Music organization

The Van Cliburn Foundation ("The Cliburn") presents the Van Cliburn International Piano Competition, Cliburn International Amateur Piano Competition, Cliburn International Junior Piano Competition and Festival, Cliburn in the Classroom, Cliburn in the Community, and Cliburn Concerts.

== History ==
Originally named the Van Cliburn International Quadrennial Piano Competition, the organization was created shortly after Van Cliburn's victory at the inaugural International Tchaikovsky Competition in Moscow in 1958 as a means of perpetuating his legacy of effecting cultural diplomacy through classical music. Instituted by a group of Fort Worth music teachers and other individuals. The first competition was held in 1962, the foundation received its tax-exempt status in 1967, and the name was changed to the Van Cliburn Foundation in 1976 to acknowledge its expanded mission and programming.

== Core programs ==
The Van Cliburn Foundation's flagship program, the Van Cliburn International Piano Competition, was established in 1962. The competition consists of three separate rounds: Preliminary, Semifinal, and Final. In addition to performing recitals, competitors are also required to perform a piano quintet during the Semifinal round, accompanied by a string quartet, and two concerti, one scored for a chamber orchestra and one scored for a full symphony orchestra, accompanied by the Fort Worth Symphony Orchestra in the Final round. Competitors are judged by an international jury of composers, pianists, teachers, and music critics. The quadrennial competition has been a member of the World Federation of International Music Competitions since 1977. For more information about the competition, please see Van Cliburn International Piano Competition.

In 1976, the Van Cliburn Foundation expanded its programming with the introduction of Cliburn Concerts, an annual classical music series in Fort Worth, Texas.

To promote music-making as a part of everyday life, the Van Cliburn Foundation established the International Piano Competition for Outstanding Amateurs in 1999. Now a quadrennial forum for non-professional musicians, the competition is open to pianists age 35 and older who do not derive their principal source of income through piano performance or instruction. The competition consists of three separate rounds of recitals. The Preliminary Round requires a recital performance of 10 to 12 minutes in length, the Semifinal Round 16 to 20 minutes in length, and the Final Round 25 to 30 minutes in length.

First Prize winner receives the Richard Rodzinski First Prize Award and a cash prize of $2,000. The second and third prize winners receive a cash prize of $1,500 and $1,000, respectively. Additional prizes included the Press Jury Award; Audience Award; awards for the Best Performance of a Work from the Baroque Era, the Classical Era, and the Romantic Era; Best Performance of a Post-Romantic Work; Best Performance of a Modern Work; Most Creative Programming Award; the Fort Worth Piano Teachers Forum Award; and Jury Discretionary Awards.

Music education has been a key component of the Van Cliburn Foundation since its inception. In 2001, the foundation created its signature music education program Musical Awakenings which is presented in public elementary schools with diverse student bodies where it serves to bridge cultural gaps and give children access to professionally presented classical music programs.

== See also ==
- Thirteenth Van Cliburn International Piano Competition
