= Alessandro Deljavan =

Italian classical pianist

Alessandro Deljavan (born 1 February 1987) is an Italian classical pianist and recording artist. He has performed internationally as a soloist and chamber musician and has an extensive discography, with repertoire ranging from Baroque and Classical works to Romantic and contemporary music.

== Biography ==
Deljavan began studying piano before the age of two and gave his first public performances at the age of three. He graduated from the Conservatory of Milan in 2003 and later continued his studies at the Istituto Gaetano Braga. From 2005 to 2013, he attended the International Piano Academy Lake Como, where he worked with musicians including William Grant Naboré, Dmitri Bashkirov, Fou Ts'ong, John Perry, Richard Goode, and Andreas Staier.

== Concert activity ==
Deljavan has performed internationally as a soloist and chamber musician with orchestras including the Mariinsky Theatre Orchestra, Fort Worth Symphony Orchestra, Orchestra Sinfonica di Milano Giuseppe Verdi, Israel Camerata Jerusalem, Lithuanian Chamber Orchestra and Boston Philharmonic Orchestra.

He has appeared three times with the Boston Philharmonic Orchestra under Benjamin Zander. He made his debut with the orchestra in 2019 performing Brahms's Piano Concerto No. 2, returned in 2024 for Mozart's Piano Concerto No. 24, and in 2025 performed Brahms's Piano Concerto No. 1 at Symphony Hall.

In 2016, Deljavan performed during the inaugural season of the Tippet Rise Art Center in Montana, where he played Chopin's Études. In 2017, he opened the Festival Chopin à Paris at the Orangerie du Parc de Bagatelle with a performance of Chopin's complete 24 Études. He has also appeared at the Biarritz Piano Festival.

In 2021, Deljavan performed music by Johann Sebastian Bach in a live RAI Radio 3 broadcast from the Cappella Paolina of the Quirinale Palace in Rome as part of I concerti del Quirinale.

In February 2023, he performed at Crans-Montana Classics in Switzerland with Francesco De Angelis and Jing Zhao. The following day he performed chamber music with members of the Teatro alla Scala Orchestra at the Teatro alla Scala in Milan.

In May 2026, he performed both Chopin piano concertos in chamber versions with the Torino String Ensemble at Sala Verdi of the Milan Conservatory.

== Prizes ==
In 1996, at the age of nine, he won the 1er Prix, 1er Nommé de la discipline piano classique, degré virtuosité in Rueil-Malmaison, France.

Other competition results include fifth place at the 2005 Gina Bachauer International Young Artists Competition, the John Giordano Jury Chairman Discretionary Award ($4,000) at the 2009 Van Cliburn International Piano Competition, and second prize at the 2010 Isang Yun Competition in Tongyeong, South Korea. In 2013, Deljavan returned to the Van Cliburn International Piano Competition, where he received the Raymond E. Buck Jury Discretionary Award ($4,000).

== Recordings ==
Deljavan has released an extensive discography, with repertoire ranging from Bach and C. P. E. Bach to Beethoven, Chopin, Schumann and later composers. His recordings have appeared on labels including OnClassical, Piano Classics, Naxos, Artalinna, and Challenge Classics.
