= Andrea Bonatta =

Italian pianist and conductor

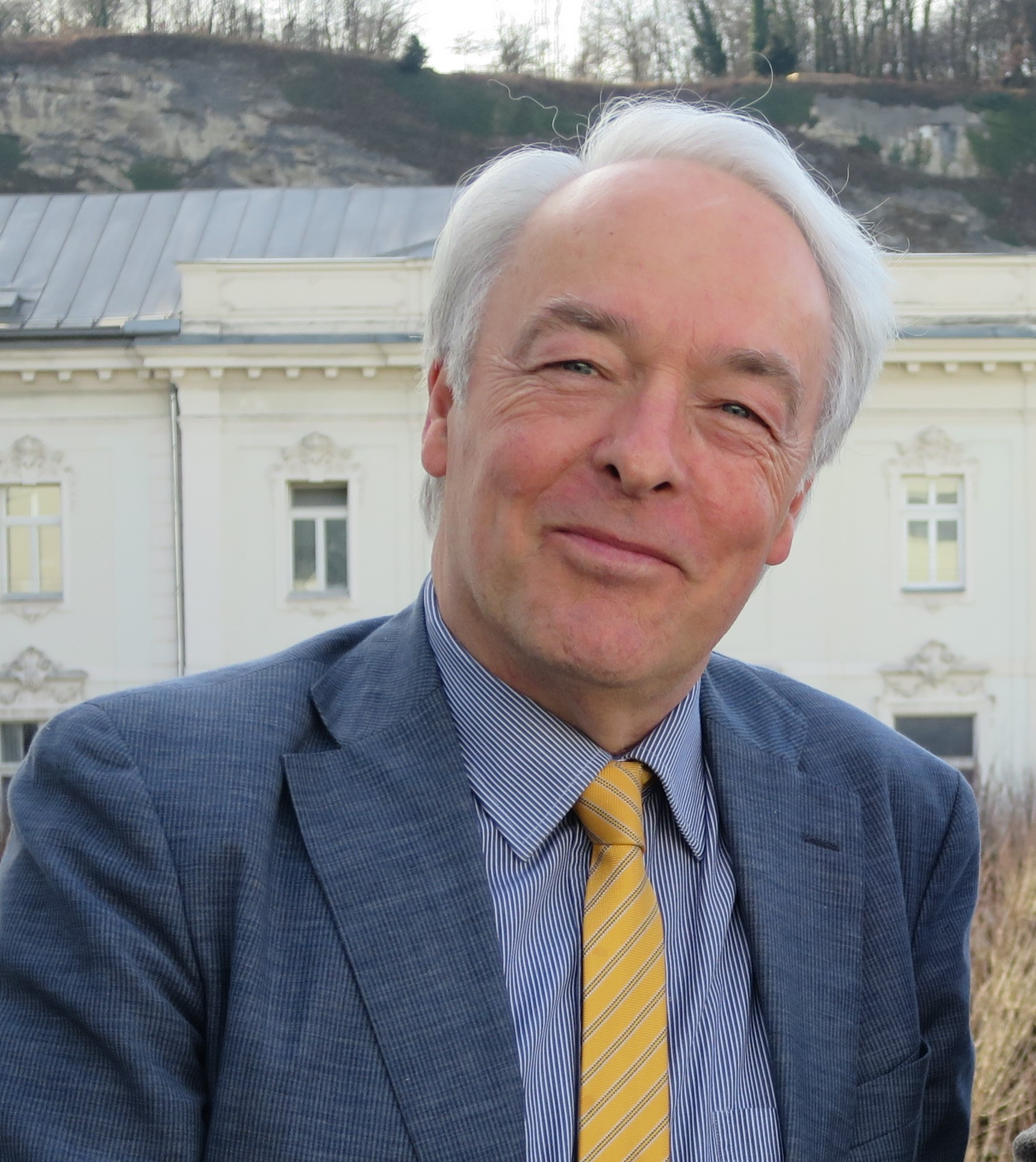
Andrea Bonatta, Salzburg 2016

Andrea Bonatta (born April 27, 1952, Bolzano, Italy) is an Italian pianist and conductor.

== Life ==
Bonatta was born in Bolzano (South Tyrol). His mother Marcella Balestri was a professional pianist and his first teacher.

He studied piano at the Conservatory in Bolzano with Nunzio Montanari and Emilio Riboli, as well as composition with Andrea Mascagni, winning several prizes in the most important national piano competitions (La Spezia, Carpi, Taranto, Cesena).

At the age of 19 he got the piano diploma and the high school diploma, both with distinction, and immediately after he was appointed Professor for piano at the Conservatory in Bolzano, where he taught for 40 years. He also studied law at the University of Bologna and Italian literature at the University of Padova. After winning top prizes in some international piano competitions (M. Canals-Barcelona, A. Casagrande-Terni) he started an international career, performing in many European countries, as well as in the US, South America and Australia. In this period he studied with Nikita Magaloff, Stefan Askenase and Wilhelm Kempff, but especially with Paul Badura-Skoda, becoming one of his favorite pupils and, later, his close friend. In 1986 he recorded his first Liszt CD for Astrée Auvidis in Paris, which was awarded with a "CHOC" by Le Monde de la musique. He also recorded for Auvidis the complete piano work by Brahms in 5 CDs, getting top critical awards like "ffff"/Telèrama and "Best CD of the Year"/ Neue Musikzeitung. In this period he often performed both Brahms Piano Concertos and the Brahms Violin Sonatas. In 1997 he published in Italian and German the book Brahms - The Piano Work, which is still considered a milestone in this field.

From 2000 to 2007 Bonatta was the artistic director of the Ferruccio Busoni International Piano Competition in Bolzano. He has also created the Busoni International Piano Festival and has been the vice-president of the World Federation of International Music Competition in Geneva. In 2005 he was appointed Honorary Professor at the Shanghai Conservatory of Music. In 2009 he created the Piano Academy Eppan, where he invites every year the best pianists of the new generation.

In spite of his various musical activities, Bonatta is still an active performer, playing in concert halls like La Sapienza in Rome, the Smetana Hall in Prague, the Salle Gaveau in Paris, the Grand Theatre in Shanghai, the Forbidden City Hall in Beijing, the Stilwerk in Berlin, the Opera House in Hanoi. He likes chamber music and has played as a duet with pianists such as Paul Badura-Skoda and Valentin Gheorghiu or violinists like Domenico Nordio and Sergei Krylov. Bonatta has been a member of the jury in the most important competitions worldwide, including Busoni-Bolzano, Liszt-Weimar, Viotti-Vercelli, Liszt-Utrecht, Schubert-Dortmund, Casagrande-Terni, UNISA-Pretoria, Young Pianists-Ettlingen, Scriabin-Moscow, CSIPC-Shanghai, CSIPCC-Shenzhen, Bechstein-Essen, CIPC-Xiamen, SIMC-Seoul, Chopin-Taipei, Hilton Head, Paderewski-Bydgoszcz, Cleveland, Beethoven-Bonn, Géza Anda-Zurich, PTNA-Tokyo, Xing-Hai-Beijing, Van Cliburn-Fort Worth, Rubinstein-Tel Aviv. He has given masterclasses in Tokyo, Shanghai, Beijing, London, Prag, Utrecht, Melbourne, Montepulciano, Seoul, Fort Worth, Hannover, Cologne, Moscow and in many others venues. Bonatta started recently a very successful activity as a conductor, conducting concertos from the piano as well as great symphonic works (first and second Brahms Symphony) with orchestras such as Shenzhen Symphony Orchestra, Orchestra del Teatro Olimpico di Vicenza, Suwon Philharmonic Orchestra (Seoul). Recently, he was invited to conduct in South-Korea the KBS Symphony Orchestra. Since 2014 Bonatta has been guest professor at the International Summer Academy Mozarteum in Salzburg.

== Discography ==
- Franz Liszt: Harmonies Poétiques et Religieuses, Consolations. AUVIDIS-ASTRÉE, E 8711, E 8712 (1986–1989)
- Johannes Brahms: Paganini-Variationen op.35, Klavierstücke op. 76, Rhapsodien op. 79. AUVIDIS-ASTRÉE, E 8754 (1990)
- Franz Liszt: Dernières Pièces pour Piano. AUVIDIS-ASTRÉE, E 8725 (1991)
- Johannes Brahms: Sonate op. 1, Sonate op. 2, Scherzo op. 4. ASTRÉE-AUVIDIS 8751 (1992)
- Johannes Brahms: Sonate op. 5, Variationen op. 9, Variationen op. 21 n.2. ASTRÉE-AUVIDIS 8752 (1993)
- Johannes Brahms: Sonates pour violon et piano (M. A. Nicolas). AUVIDIS VALOIS V 4709 (1994)
- Johannes Brahms: Balladen op. 10, Variationen op. 21 n.1, Variationen op. 24. ASTRÉE-AUVIDIS 8753 (1995)
- Franz Schubert: Pièces pour piano à quatre mains (Paul Badura-Skoda). AUVIDIS VALOIS V 4720 (1995)
- Johannes Brahms: Fantasien op. 116, Drei Intermezzi op. 117, Klavierstücke op. 118, Klavierstücke op. 119. ASTRÉE-AUVIDIS E 8599 (1997)
