= Dame Myra Hess Award =

British music award

The Dame Myra Hess Award is an award for postgraduate students of the piano. It has been presented by the Musicians Benevolent Fund (now Help Musicians UK) since 1968. Myra Hess had given the MBF crucial financial support during World War II through funds she had raised during her concert series at London's National Gallery.
