= Harmonies poétiques et religieuses =

Set of piano pieces by Franz Liszt

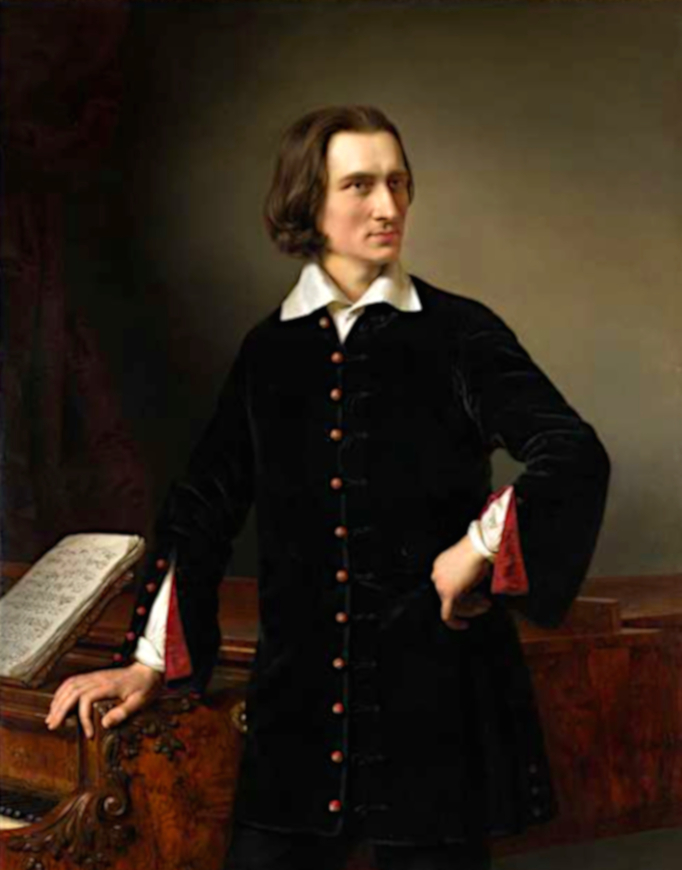
Franz Liszt, portrait by Hungarian painter Miklós Barabás, 1847

Harmonies poétiques et religieuses (Poetic and Religious Harmonies), S.173, is a cycle of piano pieces written by Franz Liszt at Woronińce (Voronivtsi, the Polish-Ukrainian country estate of Liszt's mistress Princess Carolyne von Sayn-Wittgenstein) in 1847, and published in 1853. The pieces are inspired by the poetry of Alphonse de Lamartine, as was Liszt's symphonic poem Les Préludes.

== Structure ==
The ten compositions which make up this cycle are:

1. Invocation (completed at Woronińce)
2. Ave Maria (transcription of choral piece written in 1846)
3. Bénédiction de Dieu dans la solitude ('The Blessing of God in Solitude', completed at Woronińce);
4. Pensée des morts ('In Memory of the Dead', reworked version of earlier individual composition, Harmonies poétiques et religieuses (1834))
5. Pater Noster (transcription of choral piece written in 1846)
6. Hymne de l'enfant à son réveil ('The Awaking Child’s Hymn', transcription of choral piece written in 1846)
7. Funérailles (October 1849) ('Funeral')
8. Miserere, d'après Palestrina (after Palestrina)
9. La lampe du temple (Andante lagrimoso)
10. Cantique d'amour ('Hymn of Love', completed at Woronińce)

== Reception ==
Critic Patrick Rucker wrote in 2016 that "in Liszt's engagement with the poetry of Alphonse de Lamartine, there is a naked intensity, an urgent, in-your-face, lapel-grasping earnestness that one doesn't find, say, in the Années de pèlerinage."
