= Yoheved Kaplinsky =

Israeli-American educator

2026

Yoheved "Veda" Kaplinsky (born March 23, 1947, in Tel Aviv, British Mandate of Palestine [now Israel]) is a lecturer and professor of music at the Juilliard School. She now is the artistic advisor for the Pre-College program at Juilliard.

== Education ==
She studied piano under Ilona Vincze-Kraus at the Israel Academy of Music (now the Buchmann-Mehta School of Music) and earned her bachelor, master, and doctoral degrees from the Juilliard School as a student of Irwin Freundlich. She continued her studies with Dorothy Taubman.

== Professional career ==
She began her teaching career at Philadelphia University of the Arts and then taught at the Manhattan School of Music in 1987. Between 1989 and 1997 she taught at the Peabody Conservatory in Baltimore.

She was a prize winner at the J.S. International Piano Competition in Washington, D.C.

In 1993, she began to teach at the Juilliard School. She became the chairperson of the Piano Division in 1997.

For many years, she was a professor of Piano in the Texas Christian University School of Music and was a member of the faculty at the Aspen Music Festival and School.

== Interviews ==
- Zeeble, Bill (June 1, 2005). "Celebrated Piano Instructor Kaplinsky Counts Student as Cliburn Finalist". Fort Worth: North Texas Public Broadcasting/KERA. Archived from the original on June 5, 2011.

== See also ==
- Thirteenth Van Cliburn International Piano Competition

== References and external links ==
- Zeeble, Bill (June 1, 2005). "Why are Americans disappearing from classical music scene?". Fort Worth Star-Telegram.
- The Juilliard School
- Van Cliburn TV
