= Queen Sofía Composition Prize =

The Queen Sofía Composition Prize is a Spanish symphonic composition prize created in 1983. Organized by the Ferrer-Salat Music Foundation, the winner is currently awarded €25,000 (€100,000 from 2021) and the winning composition is premiered by the RTVE Symphony the following year.

== Winners ==
Year	Winning composer	Winning composition	Finalist composers	Finalist compositions	Jurors
1983	Joan Guinjoan	Trama			Abril, E. Halffter, León, Montsalvatge, Ros
1984	Claudio Prieto	Concierto imaginante			Bernaola, Coria, Guinjoan, León, Penderecki
1985	Witold Lutoslawski	Honorary prize			Bernaola, Claret, Coria, Petrassi, Prieto
1986	José Luis Turina	Ocnos			Coria, Dutilleux, Montsalvatge, Ros
1987	Ángel Oliver	Nunc			Cano, Coria, Bernaola, Montsalvatge, Peris, Turina
1988	Agustí Charles	Iunxi			Cano, Coria, Oliver, Osborne, Otero, Peris
1989	Agustín Bertomeu	Cello Concerto			Cano, Charles, Coria, Peris, Turina
1990	Sophie Leclerc	Syzygies			Bertomeu, Cano, Coria, C. Castro, Peris
1991	Salvador Brotons	Virtus			Abril, Coria, Oliver, Peris, Prieto
1992	Xavier Montsalvatge	Honorary prize			Aracil, Bernaola, Brotons, Coria, Sardà
1993	Israel D. Martínez	La jeune martyre			Coria, Peris, Prieto, Ros, Taverna
1994	Víctor Rebullida	Adagio In memoriam			Barco, Coria, Martínez, Peris, Taverna
1995	Alejandro Civilotti	Six engravings for orchestra			
1996	Albert Llanas	Derivations			Civilotti, Coria, Peris, Taverna, Turina
1997	Fco. José Martín	Piano Concerto			Cano, Coria, C. Cruz, Llanas, Prieto
1998	Javier Santacreu	Oniris			Coria, C. Cruz, Z. Cruz, Martín, Peris
1999	Jesús Torres	Piano Concerto			Coria, Manchado, Peris, Santacreu, Sotelo
2000	Mauricio Sotelo	Si después de morir...			Aracil, Cobo, Coria, Pris, Torres
2001	Gonzalo de Olavide	Honorary prize			Coria, C. Cruz, Manchado, Sotelo, Torres
2002	Mario Gosálvez	Arlequín			
2003	Massimo Botter	Les Algues			Coria, Gosálvez, Puerto, Rueda, Torres, Villa
2004	Daniele Gasparini	Myselves Passacaglia			Botter, Coria, Manchado, Villa
2005	Eneko Vadillo	Alnur			Botter, Cantos, Charles, Gasparini, Pablo
2006	Ramón Humet	Escenas de pájaros			Camarero, Eusebio, C. Halffter, Rueda, Vadillo
2007	Gabriel Erkoreka	Fuegos	Takahiro Sakuma	Viola Concerto	Abril, Casablancas, Cerveró, Puerto, Rueda
2008	Lee Jae-moon	Seven Days / Stained Glass / Mirror	Eduardo Soutullo	That Scream Called Silence	López, Martínez, Rueda, Torres, Zavala
2009	Giovanni Bonato	Dar Gaist is heüte kemmet	Miguel Farías; Kent Olofsson	Ecos de un color AEther	Guerra, Demestres, Holt, Lee, Rueda
2010	Hermes Luaces	Agujeros negros	Giuliano Bracci; Alexander Muno	Non sei di quelli che si incantano al paesaggio Violin Concerto	Bonato, Galán, Rueda, Rohloff, Turina
2011	Seo Hong-jun	Mandalas			Aracil, Davies, Gourzi, Luaces, Rueda
2012	Chang Eun-ho	Fantasía Luminosité			Garrido, Guinjoan, Matalón, Rueda, Seo
2013	Joan Magrané Figuera	Secreta desolación			Cattaneo, Chang, Lazkano, Llorca, Rueda
2014	Miquel Oliu	Alegorías de otoño			Clarke, Coll, Magrané, Paredes, Rueda
2015	Francisco Martín Quintero				
2016	Antonio Lauzurika				
2017	Juan Duran				
2018	Juan Cruz Guevara				
2019	Carlos Fontcuberta				
2020	Octavi Rumbau				
2021	Núria Nuñez				
2022	Javier Quislan	Unda maris		Philippe Hurel, Yann Robin, Sergio Blardony, Nuria Núñez Hierro, Jesús Rueda	
2023					
