= Eduardo Soutullo =

Spanish composer (born 1968)

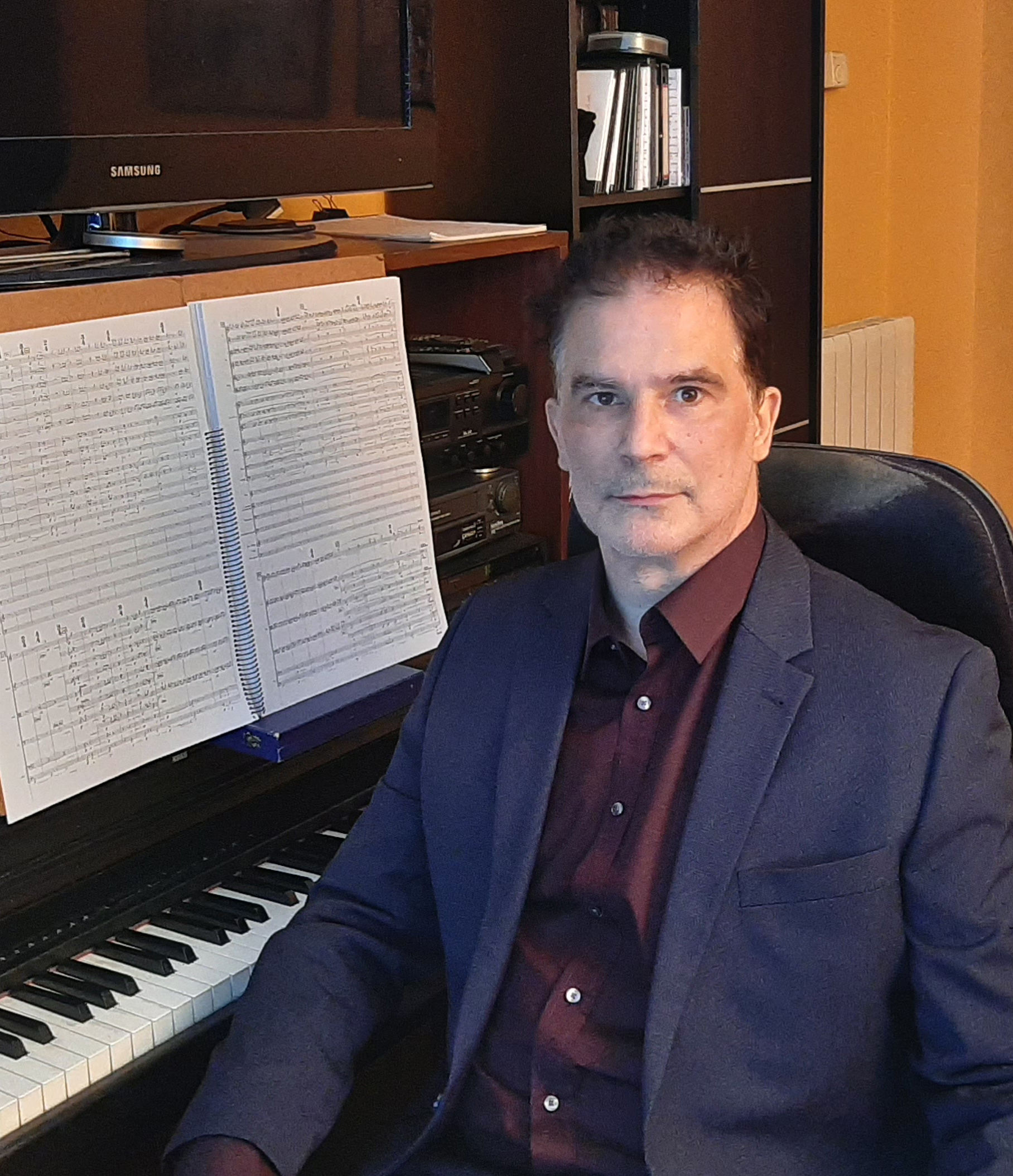
Eduardo Soutullo

Eduardo Soutullo is a Spanish composer and filmmaker. He was the recipient of the Spanish Ministry of Culture's National Prize in Music (composition) in 2023. The jury awarded the prize to Soutullo for "the unanimous international recognition of his music especially his orchestral production, highlighting the premiere in Saint Petersburg of his antiwar cantata "The lament of sunflowers”.

== Life ==
He began his musical education at the Conservatorio Superior de Música de Vigo. Later, he moved to Madrid and to Paris completing his studies in Harmony and Composition with Isabelle Duha (Conservatoire d'Issy les Molineaux-Paris XIII)

He has studied musical composition with David del Puerto, Jesús Rueda, José Luis de Delás Franco (Köln Conservatory), Richard Steinitz (Huddersfield University) and with Cristobal Halffter and Tomás Marco (Villafranca del Bierzo, Spain).

He has a master's degree from the Universidad Complutense de Madrid, and has a Doctorat (PhD) from the Universidad de Vigo (thesis about Spanish contemporary music)

He has been a professor at the Porto's Superior School of Music and Performing Arts (ESMAE)

He has been composer in residence at Spanish Academy in Rome in the course 2019-2020

In February 2022, after the beginning of the Russian invasion in Ukraine, he began the composition of Threnus Helianthuses (The lament of sunflowers, a direct reference to Ukraine's national flower), a vocal-symphonic work whose lyrics are anti-war verses of the prominent Ukrainian poet Lesya Ukrainka (1871–1913) translated into English. He submits the score to the "XVI Open composers competition named after Andrey Petrov" held in Saint Petersburg. Against all odds, the work is selected as a finalist and gets its premiere on September 15, 2022, at the Grand Hall of the St. Petersburg Academic Philharmonic by the St.Petersburg Symphony Orchestra winning the third prize of the competition

On March 7, 2024, he premieres his work Elegía (Elegy) in Madrid at the XXII concert “In memoriam” in tribute to the Victims of Terrorism presided over by Their Majesties the King and Queen of Spain. This concert is held annually on the eve of March 11, the day on which the 193 victims of the attacks perpetrated in Madrid on that date in 2004 are commemorated, being broadcast live to the entire world from the National Music Auditorium by the RTVE Symphony Orchestra (Orquesta Sinfónica de Radio Televisión Española)

He is also the author of the novel "Olozábal, el último zarzuelista, en el Madrid de la movida" published on Amazon (ASIN B08RRNGTDJ) and Smashwords (ISBN 9781005316792)

== Style ==
Musicologist Robert Fallon has written, "Eduardo Soutullo's triptych All the Echoes Listen, But in Vain and They Hear no Answering Strain, dedicates each movement to Messiaen, Takemitsu and Grisey. Melodies in All the Echoes Listen have the "Chant d'extase" contour and They Hear no Answering Strain sounds a five-note descending octatonic scale in strings much like Le tombeau resplendissant."

== Awards and honors ==
- Spanish Ministry of Culture's National Prize in Music (composition) 2023
- First Prize "X Edition of the AEOS-BBVA Foundation Composition Prize" (Spanish Association of Symphony Orchestras)
- First Prize "VII Composition Competition New Note – Croatia 2018" – Croatian Radio and Television Symphony Orchestra – 43rd Samobor Music Festival
- First Prize "Lawson-May Award for Composition 2020" (Solent Music Festival, Lymington, United Kingdom)
- Third Prize "XVI Open composers competition named after Andrey Petrov" (St. Petersburg Academic Philharmonic)
- Finalist "RED NOTE New Music Festival Composition Competition - Illinois State University Symphony Orchestra (November 2018)
- Honourable Mention in Lutoslawski Award 2007, (Warsaw, December 17, 2007), Chairman of the jury, Zygmunt Krauze
- Finalist at International Profofiev Competition (St. Petersburg, April 2008), Chairman of the jury, Rodion Shchedrin
- Third Prize International Composition Competition ITALY 150, Chairman of the jury, Magnus Lindberg
- Third Prize International Composition Competition Auditorio Nacional - Fundación BBVA, Chairman of the jury, Tristán Murail.
- Finalist at GESAMT project organized by filmmaker Lars von Trier with Copenhagen Art Festival, the Danish Film Institute and Zentropa
- Finalist at XXVI Queen Sofía Composition Prize 2008 with his PIano Concerto
- First Prize in the XV "Andrés Gaos" Prize in Music Composition 2023 (Diputación de A Coruña)
- First Prize in the VII Concurso Internacional de Composición Musical Real Academia de Bellas Artes de San Carlos
- First Prize in "Ciutat de Tarragona International Award for Musical Composition" in 2005.
- First Prize in "7th Manuel Valcárcel International Piano Composition Competition" (Marcelino Botín Foundation). The work has been premiered by Ananda Sukarlan in Santander International Festival, August 2008
- He has been one of the three composers selected to represent Spain at the World Music Days 2009 ( ISCM / International Society of Contemporary Music).

== Works ==
=== Opera ===
- Romance de lobos (2017) based on the theatrical play Romance de lobos written by Ramón María del Valle-Inclán

=== Voice and orchestra (selection) ===
- Threnus Helianthuses (The lament of sunflowers) (2022), for contralto and baritone, after poems of Lesya Ukrainka, premiered at Grand Hall of the St. Petersburg Academic Philharmonic. Winner of Third Prize in "XVI Open composers competition named after Andrey Petrov"
- Elegía (Elegy) (2024) for choir and orchestra, commissioned and premiered by Orquesta Sinfónica de RTVE conducted by Mark Korovitch, premiered in Madrid at the XXII concert “In memoriam” in tribute to the Victims of Terrorism presided over by Their Majesties the King and Queen of Spain
- Lorca en la residencia (2025), for choir and orchestra, commissioned and premiered by Orquesta Sinfónica de RTVE conducted by Christoph König

=== Orchestral (selection) ===
- All the echoes listen (2005), winner of the Ciutat de Tarragona International Award for Musical Composition".
- But in vain (2006), commissioned and premiered by Orquesta Real Filharmonia de Galicia
- They Hear no Answering Strain (2008), commissioned and premiered by Orquesta Sinfónica de Galicia and conductor Josep Pons
- Erfahrung und sonst nichts (2010), winner of Third Prize in International Composition Competition Auditorio Nacional - Fundación BBVA, premiered by Orquesta Nacional de España conducted by José Luis Temes
- Jobs and Gates at dawn (2015) commissioned and premiered by Orquesta Ciudad de Granada and conductor Virginia Martínez
- Alén (2019), winner of "X Edition of the AEOS-BBVA Foundation Composition Prize"
- Das Eismeer (The Sea of Ice) (2025), commissioned and premiered by Orquesta Nacional de España conducted by Roberto González-Monjas

=== Soloist and orchestra ===
- That scream called silence (Piano Concerto) (2007), finalist of the Queen Sofía Composition Prize 2008, premiered by Ananda Sukarlan (piano) and Orquesta Sinfónica de RTVE conducted by Adrian Leaper
- The other face of the wind (Clarinet concerto) (2010), commissioned and premiered by José Luis Estellés (clarinet) Joven Orquesta Nacional de España and conductor Patrick Davin

=== Chamber, vocal and solo works (selection) ===
- Have you said spectral? (2007, for solo piano), winner of "7th Manuel Valcárcel International Piano Composition Competition" (Marcelino Botín Foundation). Premiered at New York by Isabel Pérez Dobarro
- Lira de sombra -Isaac Albéniz in memoriam (2009, for solo piano), commissioned by Fundacion Albéniz. Performed by Gustavo Díaz-Jerez
- Cantigas de Martín Codax (2010, for soprano and piano), with the text of Cantigas de Amigo. Premiered at Carnegie Hall, New York.
- Aut Caesar, aut nihil (2012, for mixed choir), premiered at "Semana de Música Religiosa de Cuenca"
- Noh Quartet, (2014, for string quartet), Premiered at "Xornadas de Música Contemporánea" (Santiago de Compostela) by Breton String Quartet
- Le sourire d'Isabelle H. (2017 for ensemble, fl. cl. vl. vch. and piano), commissioned and premiered by Grup Instrumental de Valencia conducted by Joan Cerveró.

== Recordings (selection) ==
- All the echoes listen, by Swedish Radio Symphony Orchestra conducted by B Tommy Andersson. Sverige Radio (Live recording)
- All the echoes listen (abridged version) by Orchestre national de Lorraine conducted by Jacques Mercier. IRCAM.
- Jobs And Gates At Dawn (and Other Uchronias) by Orquesta Real Filharmonia de Galicia conducted by Paul Daniel. Odradek Records Atlantic Waters
- But in vain, by Orquesta Real Filharmonia de Galicia. Fundacion SGAE Records New symphonic works 1
- Erfahrung und sonst nichts, by Orquesta Nacional de España. Verso Records.
- Recitativ, Aria, Scherzo, by Roberto Alonso Trillo, Ouvirmos Records

== Film Making ==
Eduardo Soutullo is also the director and screenwriter of several documentaries and short films that have won awards at the following festivals:

Songs to the dead children in Auschwitz, short documentary film:

- Ecumenical Community Award, 11th AGON - International Archaeological Film Festival (Athenas). President of Jury: Oscar Academy Award winner Konstantinos Costa-Gavras
- Best Editing & Best Screenplay, 5th Festival de Cine Memoria Democrática (Madrid). President of Jury: Manuel Gutierrez Aragón
- Second Prize (Documentary Film), Festival Internacional de Cine Social de Castilla La Mancha( Toledo, Spain)
- Second Prize, 1st AMUA in-edit Musical Film Festival (Hondarribia, Spain)
- Official Selection, Near Nazareth Festival (NNF) International Film Festival (Israel)
- Official Selection, 21st NEMAF Seoul International ALT Cinema & Media Festival (South Korea)

Fons Vitae: A New Era For The Planet, Sci-Fi short film:

- Best Editing nominee 17th Grand OFF Film Festival (Warsaw)
- Official Selection, 5th The Wild Cinema (Festival Intenacional de Cinema de Medioambiente) Vigo (Spain)
- Official Selection, American Documentary And Animation Film Festival (Palm Spring, Los Angeles)
- Official Selection, First-Time Filmmaker Sessions By Lift-Off Global Network (Pinewood Studios, England)

Fílm me (on Cuba) (short documentary film):

- Best Documentary (Young Jury), 6th Cinemambiente Environmental Film Festival (Torino, Italy)
- Special Mention,16th International Festival F.I.P.A (Festival International de Programmes Audiovisuels), Biarritz (France)

== Notes ==
1. "Eduardo Soutullo puesta por rescartar la emotividad de la música en Santander", ABC, August 23, 2008.
2. "Eduardo Soutullo, clásico aos 40 anos", EL PAIS, December 12, 2008.
3. "La Sinfónica de Galicia homenajea a los grandes compositores en Lisboa", El Progreso, March 7, 2009
4. "El gallego Eduardo Soutullo, finalista de los Premios Reina Sofía", La voz de Galicia, March 12, 2009
5. "Soutullo y los ecos en soledad", EL PAIS, April 17, 2009
6. "Concierto de obras finalistas del XXVI Premio Reina SofÍa de composición musical", Agencia EFE, December 8, 2009.
7. "La Sinfónica estrena a Soutullo bajo la batuta de Rizzi", EL PAIS, February 8, 2011.
8. "-La otra cara del viento- es la segunda obra de Eduardo Soutullo para solista", Diario de León, July 21, 2011
9. "La música del vigués Eduardo Soutullo sonará en Chicago", Atlántico Diario, August 12, 2014
10. "Una mirada española a la leyenda de Ibn Battuta, el viajero del tiempo", EL MUNDO, October 17, 2016.
11. "La OCG estrena 'Jobs and gates at dawn', de Eduardo Soutullo", Granada Hoy, November 4, 2016.
12. "Una orquesta de Hong Kong estrena una pieza del compositor Eduardo Soutullo", Faro de Vigo, March 20, 2017
13. "Del amanecer a la Feria", EL PAIS, October 28, 2017.
14. "Vanguardia en marcha", Diario de Sevilla, November 13, 2017.
15. "Tres estrenos en el Ciclo de Música Contemporánea de la Quincena", Gara, August 19, 2018
16. "Eduardo Soutullo gana el primer premio de la Orquesta Sinfónica de la Radio-Televisión de Croacia", Faro de Vigo, September 30, 2018.
17. "Soutullo triunfa en EE.UU. pero no puede estrenar una ópera en Galicia", La Voz de Galicia, December 4, 2018
18. "La Real Filharmonía estrena con éxito la Suite Sinfónica nº 1 de Eduardo Soutullo", EL PAIS, June 15, 2019
19. "Eduardo Soutullo obtiene dos premios en competiciones de Croacia y Tailandia", Faro de Vigo, August 2, 2019
20. "Alén de Eduardo Soutullo gana el X Premio de Composición AEOS-Fundación BBVA", ABC, November 20, 2019
21. "Eduardo Soutullo estrena en Roma su quinteto Pentaphonics", La Voz de Galicia, July 4, 2020
22. "Roma: recinti sacri e spazializzazione sonora", Piazza di spagna, July 5, 2020
23. "Eduardo Soutullo gana el Premio Lawson-May", EL PAIS, August 3, 2020
24. "Juan Manuel Cañizares y Eduardo Soutullo, Premios Nacionales de Música 2023", Ópera Actual, September 6, 2023
25. "Juan Manuel Cañizares and Eduardo Soutullo, National Music Awards", Spain's News, September 5, 2023
26. "Juan Manuel Cañizares y Eduardo Soutullo, Premios Nacionales de Música 2023", Radio Televisión Española, September 4, 2023
