= Premio Nacional de Música =

National Music Award in Spain

National Music Award
- Premio Nacional de Música
- Sponsored by: Ministry of Culture and Sport
- Country: Spain
- Reward: €30,000
- First award: 1980
- Website: www.culturaydeporte.gob.es/cultura/artesescenicas/premios/pn-musica.html

The National Music Award (Spanish: Premio Nacional de Música) is one of Spain's annual National Awards by the Ministry of Culture.

The Spanish Government makes an annual recognition of the people or groups who have made an outstanding or innovative contribution to Spanish cultural life over the previous 12 months, through the conferring of an award in one of 29 areas covering the spectrum of plastic, fine and performing arts, literature, film, history and so on.

The Spanish Ministry of Culture awards two prizes for music every year, generally one for creation (composition) and one for interpretation (work by an individual artist or ensemble, or a musicologist). The Award is granted before 15 December each year on the basis of works published or performed during the preceding 12 months. In addition to the recognition carried by the awards, there is also prize money of 30,000 euros for each of the two categories.

A separate award for contemporary music, the Premio Nacional de las Músicas Actuales, was instituted in 2009.

Year	Composition	Interpretation
2026	Laura Vega	Cecilia Bercovich (violin and viola player)
2025	Francisco Coll	Pablo Heras-Casado (conductor)
2024	Marisa Manchado	Yolanda Auyanet (soprano)
2023	Eduardo Soutullo	Juan Manuel Cañizares (guitarist)
2022	Alicia Díaz de la Fuente	Jaime Martín (conductor)
2021	Gabriel Erkoreka	Montserrat Torrent i Serra (organist)
2020	Raquel García-Tomás	Spanish Brass (brass ensemble)
2019	Félix Ibarrondo	Asier Polo (cellist)
2018	Javier Darias	Cuarteto Quiroga (string quartet)
2017	Teresa Catalán	Rosa Torres-Pardo (pianist)
2016	Antoni Parera Fons	Juanjo Mena (conductor)
2015	Alfredo Aracil	María José Montiel (mezzosoprano)
2014	María de Alvear	Jordi Savall (violagambist and conductor, refused prize in protest of the cultural policies of the Spanish government)
2013	Benet Casablancas	Trío Arbós (piano and strings trio)
2012	Jesús Torres (web, es)	Javier Perianes (pianist)
2011	Alberto Posadas	Orquesta Barroca de Sevilla (web, es) (baroque ensemble)
2010	Elena Mendoza (web)	Diego Fernández Magdaleno (web) (contemporary pianist)
2009	Josep Soler i Sardà (es)	María Bayo (web, es) (operatic soprano)
2008	Carles Santos	José Luis Temes (es) (conductor)
2007	Jorge Fernández Guerra (web)	Miguel Poveda (es) (cantaor)
2006	César Camarero (web)	Cuarteto Casals (string quartet)
2005	David del Puerto	Grup Instrumental de València (contemporary music ensemble)
2004	Jesús Rueda Azcuaga	Al Ayre Español (period vocal and instrumental ensemble)
2003	José María Sánchez-Verdú	Carlos Álvarez (baritone)
2002	Tomás Marco	Arturo Tamayo (conductor)
2001	Mauricio Sotelo	Carmen Linares (cantaora)
2000	José Manuel López López (fr)	Manolo Sanlúcar (flamenco guitarist)
1999	Ángel Martín Pompey	Josep Pons (conductor)
1998	Agustín González de Acilu	Josep Colom (conductor)
1997	José Ramón García Román	Sax Ensemble
1996	José Luis Turina	Teresa Berganza (mezzo-soprano)
1995	José Luis de Delás (es)	Víctor Pablo Pérez Pérez (conductor)
1994	Jesús Villa Rojo	Enrique Morente (cantaor)
1993	Antón García Abril	Luis Galve Raso (pianist)
1992	Carmelo Alonso Bernaola	Joaquín Achúcarro (pianist)
1991	Luis De Pablo	Guillermo González Hernández (es) (pianist)
1990	Manuel Castillo (es); Joan Guinjoan)	
1989	Cristóbal Halffter	Antoni Ros-Marbà (conductor)
1988	José Ramón Encinar	Montserrat Caballé (soprano)
1987	Gonzalo de Olavide	Narciso Yepes (guitarist)
1986	Rodolfo Halffter	Miguel Querol Gavalda (musicologist)
1985	Xavier Montsalvatge	Alicia de Larrocha (pianist)
1984	Ernesto Halffter	Eduardo del Pueyo (es) (pianist)
1983	Joaquín Rodrigo	Nicanor Zabaleta (harpist)
1982	Fernando Remacha	Andrés Segovia (classical guitarist); Montserrat Caballé (operatic soprano)
1981	Frederic Mompou	
1980		Victoria de los Ángeles (operatic soprano)
