= Generación del 51 =

Designation for one of a series of "generations" of Spanish composers

Generación del 51 is a designation for one of a series of "generations" of Spanish composers, identifying a group born between 1924 and 1938.

Members of this group of composers from the Basque and Castilian-speaking regions of Spain include:

- Carmelo Alonso Bernaola (1929–2002)
- Miguel Alonso (1925–2002)
- Ángel Arteaga (1928–1984)
- Cristóbal Halffter (1930–2021)
- Ramón Barce (1928–2008)
- Agustín Bertomeu (born 1929)
- Amando Blanquer (1935–2005)
- Francisco Calés (1925–1985)
- Manuel Castillo (1930–2005)
- Juan José Falcón Sanabria (born 1936)
- Antón García Abril (1933–2021)
- Agustín González Acilu (born 1929)
- Juan Hidalgo (1927–2018)
- Ángel Oliver (1937–2005)
- Luis de Pablo (1930–2021)
- Claudio Prieto (1934–2015)

In their earlier works, members of this generation tended toward the avant-garde, with post-Webernian serialism evident in the work of Halffter and Luis de Pablo in particular. By the end of the 1970s a mellowing of their language becomes apparent, and during the 1980s many of them began to turn to tonality of one sort or another.

The Catalan members of this generation are associated with the reforming and renewing tendencies that emerged after the post-Civil War isolation:

- Xavier Benguerel i Godó (1931–2017)
- Joan Guinjoan (1931–2019)
- Josep Mestres Quadreny (1929–2021)
- Josep Soler i Sardà (1935-2022)

Soler's compositional palette involves serial techniques, and he is particularly noted for his dramatic music.

== Sources ==
- Sadie, Stanley; Tyrrell, John, eds. (2001). The New Grove Dictionary of Music and Musicians (2nd ed.). London: Macmillan. ISBN 9780195170672.
