= Olavide =

Olavide may refer to:

- Pablo de Olavide University, university in Seville, Spain.
- Gonzalo de Olavide (1934–2005), Spanish composer
- Miguel Olavide (born 1996), Spanish footballer.
- Pablo de Olavide (1725-1803), Spanish politician.
- José Eugenio Olavide (1831-1901), Spanish dermatologist.
