= Miguel Ángel Coria =

Spanish composer

Miguel Ángel Coria Varela (24 October 1937 – 24 February 2016) was a Spanish composer of classical music. His early work showed affinities to the music of Anton Webern, but he became increasingly influenced by Impressionism. From 1973 he entered his post-modern period where his compositions were marked by "attempts to evoke the spirit of the music of the past, but without literal allusions". In addition to his instrumental music, he also composed an opera, Belisa, which premiered at the Teatro de la Zarzuela in 1992. Coria served as the Administrative Director of the RTVE Symphony Orchestra and Chorus in the 1980s and was a co-founder of ALEA, Spain's first laboratory for electronic music.

== Life and career ==
Miguel Ángel Coria was born in Madrid in 1937 and began his musical studies in 1952. His early mentors were Antonio Iges, Ángel Arias, Pedro Lerma and most importantly Gerardo Gombau with whom he studied composition at the Madrid Royal Conservatory. Coria won the Conservatory's Fugue Prize in 1961. He also showed an early interest in electroacoustic music and in 1964 joined Luis de Pablo and Carmelo Alonso Bernaola in founding ALEA, Spain's first laboratory for electronic music. A grant from the Gaudeamus Foundation in 1965 allowed him to pursue further studies with Roman Haubenstock-Ramati and Iannis Xenakis. The following year, he received a grant from the Juan March Foundation to study with Gottfried Michael Koenig at the Institute of Sonology in Utrecht, during which time he composed Collage (1967) and Joyce's Portrait (1968). His early work showed affinities to the music of Anton Webern, but became increasingly influenced by French Impressionist music. However, the Spanish composer and writer, Tomás Marco, has concluded that Coria's work ultimately "stands out as a completely personal statement", adding that "those who have tried to follow him have been unable to reproduce the most original aspects of his music on the same level."

1973 marked the beginning of Coria's postmodernist period, exemplified by works in homage of past composers, although typically without literal allusions to their music. These include: Ravel for President, composed in 1973 and dedicated to the pianist Pedro Espinosa, who premiered the work; Falla Revisited, premiered in the Teatro Real by the RTVE Symphony Orchestra in 1977; Ancora una volta, premiered in 1979 by the Orquesta Nacional de España; and J'ai perdu ma plume dans le jardin de Turina (I lost my pen in Turina's garden), composed for the centenary of Joaquín Turina in 1982. Coria's ballet music Seis sonatas para la Reina de España (Six sonatas for the Queen of Spain), based on six harpsichord sonatas by Domenico Scarlatti, was premiered in 1985 at the Festival dei Due Mondi in Spoleto in a production choreographed by Ángel Pericet for the Spanish National Ballet. At the age of 55, he ventured into opera with Belisa, set to a libretto by Antonio Gallego Gallego adapted from García Lorca's play Amor de Don Perlimplín con Belisa en su jardín. The work premiered on 15 May 1992 at the Teatro de la Zarzuela in Madrid.

Coria has not been a particularly prolific composer compared to some of his contemporaries, and his works tend to be small-scale—even his opera Belisa lasts only 30 minutes. His composing career proceeded in parallel with private teaching (one of his students was Miguel Roig-Francolí) and various administrative posts in the musical life of Spain. He was one of the founders of the Asociación de Compositores Españoles, an organization dedicated to promoting the music of contemporary Spanish composers, and has worked as a consultant to Spain's Ministry of Culture. He also served as the Administrative Director of the RTVE Symphony Orchestra and Chorus in the 1980s, and for many years was Technical Director of the Fundació de Música Ferrer Salat (Ferrer Salat Music Foundation).

== Works ==
The following list includes Coria's principal works, the majority of which are published by Editorial de Música Española Contemporanea. A complete catalogue of his compositions was published by the Sociedad General de Autores de España in 1991. (Unless otherwise indicated, the dates represent date of composition.)

=== Orchestra ===
- Lúdica I, 1968-9
- Lúdica III, 1969
- Ancora una volta (One more time), 1978, premiered 1979, Madrid
- Una modesta proposición para que los compositores pobres de España no constituyan una carga para sus padres ni su pais y sean útiles al público (A modest proposal so that poor Spanish composers do not constitute a burden on either their parents or the nation and are useful to the public), homage to Antonio Soler, composed 1979, premiered 1980, Madrid
- Intermezzo, 1981

=== Chamber ensemble/solo instrument ===
- Juego de densidades (Game of densities), piano, 1962
- Estructura, string trio, 1963
- Frase, piano, 1965, revised 1968
- Secuencia, violin, 1966
- Vértices, chamber ensemble, 1966
- Volúmenes, chamber ensemble, 1966
- Lúdica IV, chamber ensemble, 1970
- Falla Revisited, homage to Manuel de Falla, chamber ensemble, 1973, premiered 1977, Madrid
- Ravel for President, homage to Maurice Ravel, piano, 1973
- Música de septiembre, chamber ensemble, 1975
- En rouge et noir (In red and black), piano, 1976
- J'ai perdu ma plume dans le jardin de Turina (I lost my pen in Turina's garden), composed for the centenary of Joaquín Turina, piano, 1982

=== Electronic ===
- Collage, 1967

=== Vocal ===
- Joyce's Portrait, homage to James Joyce, premiered by Isabel Rivas, 1968, Madrid
- Arietta no.3: Verrá la morte (Death will come), set to a text by Cesare Pavese, 1984
- Arietta no.1: Canción de Belisa (Belisa's song), set to a text by García Lorca, 1985-6
- Arietta no.2: La chevelure (Hair), set to a text by Baudelaire, 1988
- Seis canciones españolas (Six Spanish songs), set to texts by Rafael Alberti, published 1995

=== Ballet ===
- Variaciones vascas (Basque variations), choreographed by Ángel Pericet, premiered 1965, Teatro de la Zarzuela, Madrid
- Seis sonatas para la Reina de España (Six Sonatas for the Queen of Spain), after Scarlatti, choreographed by Ángel Pericet, premiered 1985, Festival dei Due Mondi, Spoleto

=== Opera ===
- Belisa, libretto by Antonio Gallego adapted from García Lorca's Amor de Don Perlimplín con Belisa en su jardín, premiered 15 May 1992, Teatro de la Zarzuela, Madrid

== Recordings ==
Coria himself can be heard playing his composition for prepared piano, En rouge et noir, on an album of the same name originally released on LP in 1976 by the Italian label Cramps in their Musica nuova series, and re-released on CD by the same company in 2004. His piano pieces, Ravel for President (1973) and Frase (1965), performed by the Spanish pianist, Pedro Espinosa, appear on the CD Anthology of Contemporary Spanish Music, released by EMEC Discos (Editorial de Música Española Contemporánea) in 1994.
