= Raquel García-Tomás =

Spanish composer (born 1984)

Raquel García-Tomás (born in Barcelona, 1984) is a Spanish composer specialized in multidisciplinary and collaborative creation. In 2020 she was awarded the Premio Nacional de Música in the Composition category, annually granted by the Ministry of Culture and Sports of Spain. With her work "Alexina B." she became the second female composer to premiere an opera at the Gran Teatre del Liceu and the first in the 21st century.

== Life and career ==
She studied musical composition at the Catalonia College of Music (ESMUC) and earned her doctorate at the Royal College of Music in London, where she lived for six years. She has worked on joint creations with the English National Ballet, the Royal Academy of Arts, and the Dresden Music Festival.

Her music has been performed at the Auditori de Barcelona, the Palau de la Música Catalana, the Teatre Lliure, the National Theater of Catalonia, the Palau de la Música in Valencia, the Teatro Español, the Teatros del Canal, and the Museo Nacional Centro de Arte Reina Sofía. Her compositions have been heard in various cities, mainly in Europe, but also in Cairo, Rosario, and Buenos Aires.

She collaborated in the creation of the chamber opera "Dido reloaded" with Xavier Bonfill, Joan Magrané, and Octavi Rumbau which premiered in October 2013 in Barcelona and Madrid. The same team continued the project with "Go, Aeneas, Go!" which premiered in May 2014 at the Russisches Haus der Wissenschaft und Kultur in Berlin after winning the first prize of the Berliner Opernpreis organized by the Neuköllner Oper.

In 2015, García-Tomás and Magrané created the opera "disPLACE," which was performed Vienna, Barcelona, and Madrid.

García-Tomás collaborated in 2016 as a composer and video creator with German stage director Matthias Rebstock on works premiered at the Grec Festival and Neuköllner Oper Berlin. She was the guest composer for the 2015-2016 contemporary music cycle Sampler Series at the Auditorium of Barcelona, with her work "Blind Contours no. 1," performed by the Oslo Sinfonietta. Her music has been commissioned or collaborated on with various groups including Madrid Symphony Orchestra.

On February 14, 2018, the National Theater of Catalonia premiered "Balena blava" with music by García-Tomàs and text by Victoria Szpunberg, a twenty-minute work inspired by Igor Stravinsky's "The Rite of Spring". That same year, the comic opera "Je suis narcissiste" created with Helena Tornero (libretto) and Marta Pazos (scenography), was premiered at the Teatro Real and the Teatro Español in Madrid; and the Teatre Lliure in Barcelona.

In 2020, she was awarded the Premio Nacional de Música in the Composition category, annually granted by the Ministry of Culture and Sports of Spain.

On May 13, 2022, she premiered a symphonic choral work, "Suite of Myself" at L'Auditori, musically based on Bach's "St John Passion" and literarily on poems by Walt Whitman.

On March 18, 2023, García-Tomás premiered the opera "Alexina B." at the Gran Teatre del Liceu. For its creation, she collaborated with librettist Irène Gayraud and stage director Marta Pazos. The opera is inspired by the memoirs of Herculine Barbin, also known as Alexina B., an intersex person who lived in France in the 19th century. With the premiere of "Alexina B." García-Tomás became the first female composer to premiere an opera at the Liceu in the 21st century and the second in the history of that theater after Matilde Salvador, who premiered "Vinatea" in 1974.

== Awards ==
- 2017 – El Ojo Crítico award from Radio Nacional de España of classical music.
- 2019 – Interdisciplinary award from Acadèmia Catalana de la Música for her opera Je suis narcissiste.
- 2020 – Finalist in Premios Max in categories Best Composition and Best Musical Work for her opera Je suis narcissiste.
- 2020 – Finalist in International Opera Awards in World Premiere category for her opera Je suis narcissiste.
- 2020 – Premio Nacional de Música in the Composition category by the Ministry of Culture and Sports of Spain.
- 2023 – Finalist in International Opera Awards in World Premiere category for her opera Alexina B.
- 2024 – Premi Nacional de Cultura by the Generalitat de Catalunya.
