= Jesús Rueda =

Jesús Rueda is the name of:

- Jesús Rueda (composer) (born 1961), Spanish composer
- Jesús Rueda (footballer) (born 1987), Spanish footballer
