= Agustí Charles =

Agustí Charles i Soler
- Born: 12 July 1960 (age 64); Manresa, Spain
- Occupation: Composer
- Years active: 2000–present

Agustí Charles i Soler (Catalan: [əɣusˈti ˈkaɾləz i suˈle]; Spanish: Agustín Charles Soler [aɣusˈtin ˈtʃaɾles soˈleɾ]; born 12 July 1960) is a Spanish-born composer and scholar.

== Biography ==
He was born in Manresa (Province of Barcelona). His first works in composition date back to the 1980s, under the guidance of his first composition teachers: Miquel Roger, Albert Sardà and Josep Soler. Later, he studied with Franco Donatoni, Luigi Nono and Samuel Adler, as well as worked with other composers and conductors including Joan Guinjoan, Cristóbal Halffter, J.R. Encinar and Ros Marbà.

== Career ==
His work Seven Looks, inspired by the poems of García Lorca was awarded the 2003 prize of the Spanish Association of Symphony Orchestras (AEOS) and has been played by a number of Spanish and German orchestras in the 2004 and 2008 seasons. His first opera La Cuzzoni, esperpent d’una veu, was premiered in October 2007 at the Darmstadt Staatstheater in Germany. In 2008, the Italian Stradivarius Records issued a CD which includes his orchestral work, performed by the Community of Madrid Orchestra and conducted by José Ramón Encinar. In 2010, Tritó Records compiled a release in conjunction with the Barcelona Symphony Orchestra and National Orchestra of Catalonia, conducted by Jaime Martin. In March 2011, the premiere of his second opera, Lord Byron: A summer without summer, took place in the Staatstheater Darmstadt, Germany, while it was staged again in Barcelona the following year. The libretto is by Marc Rosich with stage direction by Alfonso Romero Mora. In August 2012, the premiere of his third opera Java Suite took place in the Perelada Festival (Girona, Spain).

== Publications ==
He is also author of texts and books related to musical composition and analysis, among them: Análisis de la música española del siglo XX (2002), Dodecafonismo y serialismo en España (2005), Colección Instrumentación y orquestación clásica y contemporánea (5 vols) (2005–2012).

Charles currently teaches composition at the Catalonia College of Music in Barcelona.
