= David del Puerto =

Spanish composer

David del Puerto is a Spanish composer.

== Biography ==
Born in 1964 in Madrid, musically trained in the guitar, disciple of Francisco Guerrero and Luis de Pablo in his native city, David del Puerto emerged very early as one of the most talented composers of his generation. At just 20 his name was on the bill at the Almeida Festival in London and shortly afterwards he was commissioned by Pierre Boulez to write a new work for the Ensemble InterContemporain. Since then, his music has been present at the most important concert festivals and seasons in Europe, Japan, Indonesia, Australia, United States, Canada and Latin America, where it has been performed by ensembles such as the London Symphony, Finnish Radio Symphony Orchestra, Nieuw Ensemble, Wisconsin University Symphony Orchestra, Orchestre Symphonique de Mulhouse, ONE, Orquesta RTVE, JONDE, ORCAM, Real Filharmonía de Galicia, OSPA, Plural Ensemble, Grup Instrumental de Valencia, Taller Sonoro, Cuarteto Casals... His works have been performed by soloists the likes of Ernest Rombout, Ananda Sukarlan, Miquel Bernat, Ángel Luis Castaño, Manuel Guillén, Evelyn Glennie and Sarah Leonard, and conducted by the likes of Ed Spanjaard, Sakari Oramo, Diego Masson, Luca Pfaff, José Ramón Encinar, Josep Pons, Pedro Halffter, Fabián Panisello, Tapio Tuomela, Pablo González Bernardo, Pablo Heras, Dmitri Loos, etc.

He has also been intensely active in teaching as guest professor at universities, conservatories and courses in Europe and the US. He is currently professor of Analysis at the Reina Sofía School of Music in Madrid.

In 1993, he won the Premio Gaudeamus with his Concierto for oboe and chamber ensemble, and in the same year received the prize El ojo crítico from Radio Nacional de España.

In 2005, he was awarded the Premio Nacional de Música for composition.

The musical life of David del Puerto has been marked by a serene but fierce search for himself, without reservations or concessions, which has meant he has forged one of the most original and personal career paths of the current panorama: His art, vital, complex, deep, always bathed in its author's personality, feeds on numerous influences from different eras and places on the planet, influences that, in the hands of the composer naturally become a part of his personal heritage, which he uses to configure an unequalled musical language.

David del Puerto is a founder member of Música Presente.

His music can be heard on the labels Stradivarius, Tritó, and Orpheus.

== Catalogue ==
=== Works for solo instruments ===
- Verso I (1987) for Solo fl
- Verso III (1994) for 1 perc (mba, 2 Chinese toms, 2 cymbals)
- Intrata (1995) for Pf
- Poema (1996) for Guit
- Verso IV (1996) for Pf
- Rejoice (1999)
- Mirada (2002) for Guit
- Alio Modo (2002) for Pf
- Sonata (2003) for Solo cl
- Dos Preludios (2003) for Guit
- Dos Dedicatorias (2004) for Solo vln
- Rondόs (2004) for Pf
- Cuaderno para los Niños (2005) for Pf
- Fantasía para Acordeón (2005) for Ac
- Winter Suite (2006) for Guit
- Sesis Estudios para Guitarra (2006) for Guit
- Nocturno y Toccata (2006) for Guit
- Bluescape (2007) for Solo vln
- Cuaderno de Instantes (2007) for Guit

=== Ensemble works for 2-5 instruments ===
- Veladura (1985, rev. 1996): Cl, vibr, pf
- Sequor (1985): Fl, vla, guit
- Consort (1991): Recorders quartet
- Verso II (1991): Cl, vc
- Etude (1993): Fl, ob, cl, hrn, bn
- Wiegenlied para Leo (1997): Bass cl, 1 perc
- Dolce (1998): Cl, pf
- Comedia (2000): 2 recorders, vla da gamba, harpsichord
- Diario (2001): Acc, pf
- String Quartet (2002): 2 vln, vla, vc
- Epitafio (2002): 2 vln, vla, vc
- Advenit (2003): Cl, vln, vc, pf
- Una Suite para Leo (2003): Sax, perc, pf
- Intermezzo (2003): 2 vln, vla, vc, db
- Imromptu (2005): Fl, cl, vln, vc, pf
- Meridies (2006): Fl, guit

=== Ensemble works without soloist ===
- Ritual (1984): Ob, cl, hrn, 2 tbn, vc, db, 1 perc
- En la Luz (1986): Fl, bass cl, pf, 1 perc, vln, vla
- Invernal (1991): 12 instruments (1.1.1.1 – 1.0.0.0 – pf, 1 perc – 1.1.1.1.1)
- Kleines Konzert (1992): Ob, cl, hrn, mba, vln, va, vc
- Intermezzo (1998): String orchestra
- Mito (1999): 13 instruments (1.1.1.1 – 1.0.0.0 – vibr, mba, pf – 1.1.1.1.1)
- Trencadís de Festa (2001): 14 instruments (1.1.1.1 – 1.1.1.0 – mba, pf – 1.1.1.1.1)
- Nigredo (2003): 8 vc
- Divertimento para Cuerdas (2006): String orchestra (or string quintet)
- Fantasía Impromptu (2006): Fl, cl, sax, perc, pf, vn, vc

=== Ensemble works with soloist ===
- Deneb (1988): 1 solo perc (vibr + mba), 2 ob, 2 bn, 2 hrn, 2 tr, 2 tbn, tba
- Concierto para Oboe Nº1 (1992):Solo ob, cl, bn, hrn, pf, hrp, 1 perc, 2 vln, vla, vc, cb
- Concierto para Marimba (1996): Solo mba and 15 instruments (1.1.1.1 – 1.1.1.0 – pf, timp, 1 perc – 1.1.1.1.1
- Concierto para Oboe Nº2 (2005): Solo ob, fl, bass cl, mand, guit, hrp, 1 perc, vln, vla, vc, cb

=== Works for orchestra without soloist ===
- Corriente Cautiva (1990): Orchestra (2.2.2.2 – 2.2.2.0 – 2 perc – 4.4.4.3.2)
- Adagio (1997): Orchestra (2.2.2.2 – 2.2.0.0 – timp, pf – Strings)
- Fantasía Primera (1998): Orchestra (3.3.4.3 – 4.3.3.1 – timp, 3 perc, pf, hrp – Strings)
- Fantasía Segunda (2000): Orchestra (3.3.4.3 – 4.3.3.1 – timp, 3 perc, pf, hrp – Strings)
- Variazioni sulla Ritirata Notturna di Madrid (2002): Orchestration of the 3rd mov. from Quintet op. 57 nº 6 de Boccherini (2.2.2.2 – 2.2.0.0 – timp – Strings)
- Symphony N. 1 "BOREAS"' (2004): Orchestra (2.2.2.2 – 2.2.1.0 – 2 perc – Strings)
- Year Hopping (2006): Orchestra (2.2.2.2 – 2.2.0.0 – timp – Strings)
- Variaciones in Memoriam Gonzalo de Olavide (2006): Orchestra (2.2.2.2 – 2.2.2.1 – timp, 3 perc, pf, hrp – Strings) -

=== Works for orchestra and soloist ===
- Violin Concerto (1997): Solo vln and orchestra (3.3.3.3 – 4.3.3.0 – timp, 3 perc, vibr, mba, pf, hrp – Strings)
- Symphony Nr 2, “NUSANTARA” (2005): Solo pf and orchestra (2.2.2.2 – 2.2.2.0 – timp, 2 perc – Strings), written for the Indonesian pianist and composer Ananda Sukarlan

=== Works for voice and instruments ===
- Canto de las Dos Naturalezas (1989): Sopr, fl, ob, bass cl, bn, pf, 1 perc – (Texts from Bhagavad-Gita)
- Canto del Abismo (1994): Sopr, fl, ob, cl, 1 perc, vln, vc – Dur: 8’ (Poems by Juan-Eduardo Cirlot)
- Nocturno (2002): Sopr, vln, vc, pf – Dur: 12’ (Text by David del Puerto)
- Sobre la Noche (2003): Sopr, acc – Dur: 12’ (Text by David del Puerto)

=== Choral works ===
- Visión del Errante (1994): 12 mixed voices (3S, 3A, 3T, 3B) – Dur: 9 ft 30 in (Poem by David del Puerto)
- Paisaje (1998): 4 mixed voices (SATB) – Dur: 7’ (Poem by David del Puerto)
- Espacio de la Luz (2003): 4 mixed voices (SATB) – Dur: 7’ (Poem by David del Puerto)

=== Opera ===
- Sol de Invierno (2001): Chamber opera for mezzo, baritone and 6 perc (2 mba, 2 vibr, 2 steel dr) – (Libretto by David del Puerto based on the final scene of “Ghosts” by Henrik Ibsen)
