= Cristòfor Taltabull =

Spanish composer and music pedagogue (1888–1964)

Cristòfor Taltabull (28 July 1888 – 1 May 1964) was a Spanish composer and pedagogue who played a role in the reconstruction of musical life in Catalonia after the Spanish Civil War.

== Biography ==
Taltabull was born in Barcelona. He came from an educated, middle-class family and studied music (mainly piano) locally. Upon the first publication of his work in 1907, he moved to Munich to study aesthetics and music theory under Franz Wiedermeyer. He also studied composition in Leipzig with Max Reger, to whom Taltabull dedicated his Sonatina per a piano (1910).

In 1911, after a brief stay in Barcelona, he established himself in Paris working as a composer, pianist, and arranger. While in Paris, he continued his musical studies with André Gedalge, Charles Tournemire and Charles Koechlin. He married Lea Masson in 1914. He was forced to leave Paris during the German invasion of France during World War II.

When Taltabull returned to Barcelona, he was received indifferently and did not find much professional success in Spain under Francisco Franco. He supported himself by giving private music lessons in his home. He died in Barcelona in 1964.

After his death, Taltabull's pupils celebrated him as a gifted teacher. Some of the most important Catalan musical figures of the later 20th century, such as Xavier Benguerel, Joan Guinjoan, Josep Mestres Quadreny, Josep Soler, and Salvador Moreno Manzano, were among Taltabull's students.

The archives and personal papers of Cristòfor Taltabull are preserved in the Biblioteca de Catalunya in Barcelona.
