= Alejandro Civilotti =

Argentine composer (born 1959)

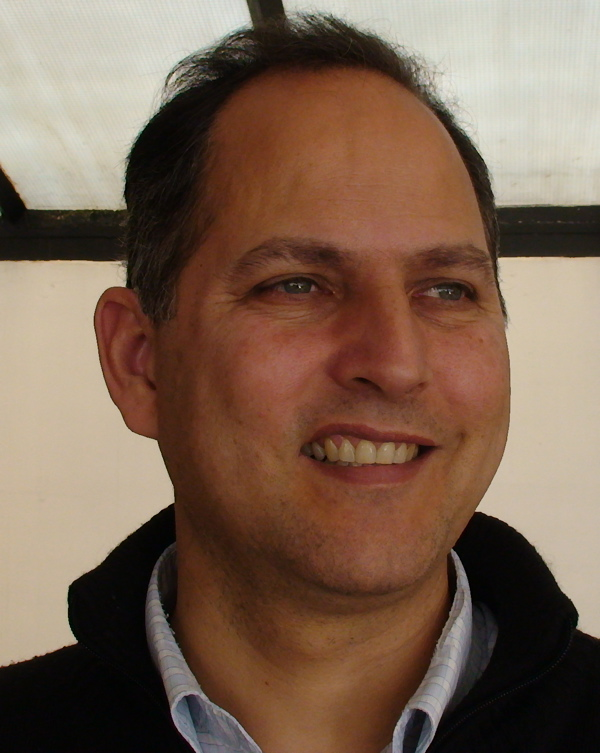
A portrait of Alejandro Gabriel Civilotti Carvalho

Alejandro Gabriel Civilotti Carvalho (born June 22, 1959, La Plata, Argentina). Argentine composer settled in Barcelona, Spain, considered one of the biggest names of his generation in the contemporary Spanish music scene-.

Civilotti studied harmony, counterpoint and composition in La Plata with Enrique Gerardi, who studied with Alberto Ginastera and was in Paris a Pierre Schaeffer and Nadia Boulanger's pupil. Civilotti studied composition and orchestration in Barcelona with Josep Soler i Sardà also.

In 1995 he won the Queen Sofía Composition Prize for his work Cinco Grabados para Orquesta.

In 2005 he began working as a professor in the Graduate Chamber Music Composition of the Autonomous University of Barcelona.

Currently is teacher of Harmony and Composition in the Badalona Conservatory of Music and member of the Catalan Association of Composers. The personal papers of Alejandro Civilotti are preserved in the Biblioteca de Catalunya.

== Key works ==
=== Choral works ===
Inframundi (1998) I. Teotihuacan Text II. Text of Seneca the Younger (Latin) about Orpheo.

Salve Regina. White Voices Choir and Organ.

=== Orchestral works ===
- Symphony No. 1 (1985)
- Cinco Grabados para orquesta (1991)
- Symphony No. 2 Azteca (1996-1998). Baritono-Bajo solo, Coro mixto y Gran orquesta.
- Symphony No. 3 The Garden of Mist (2000)
- Symphony No. 4 (2001)
- The Scream (2001)
- Elegía por Julia Ponce, de Lavapiés (2002)
- ... en Abril (2002)
- Symphony No. 5 (2004)
- Concerto for Bandoneon and Orchestra (2006)
- Quasi Tango Suite (2007, orq. 2010)

=== String orchestra ===
- Elegía trágica (1987). Flute solo, Piano, Timpani and Flexatone.
- Cuatro impressiones para cuerdas (1996)
- Concierto de Cámara (1998-2000). For oboe and String Orchestra
- Ocultas geometrías (1999). Piano and String Orchestra (Clarinet solo ad libitum)
- Tres Postales para Marianela (2002). Flutes (8) Cl.(Bb) Fg. Pno. and Strings (no Double Bass)
- Concerto for Tuba and Strings (2006)
- Miralls (2012). For the Orquesta de Cambra Amics dels Clàssics

=== Solo voice and orchestra ===
- Momentos del Poeta (1987). For tenor and orchestra. Vladimir Maiakovsky's Poems.
- Padre Nostro (1998). For Soprano, Baritone and orchestra.
- Elogio por Santander (2004). Big orchestra and mixed choir. Texts of Amós de Escalante

=== Solo with orchestra ===
- Variantes concertantes- for piano and orchestra (1988–89)
- Rapsodia for percussion solo and orchestra (1992). Dedicated to Ángel Frette
- Auris Concertum, for Violoncello and orchestra (2001). Dedicated to the Queen Sofía of Spain.
- Concerto for Bandoneon and Big Orchestra, in memoriam Omar Lupi (2002). Dedicated to Pablo Mainetti and Marcelo Mercadante
- Auris Resonantiam, for Violin and Orchestra (2003)
- Concerto for Clarinet (A) and Big orchestra (2004). Dedicated to Joan Pere Gil
- Concerto for Electric Guitar and orchestra (2005). In memoriam Sergio Javier Godoy.
- Urdaibai (2009) Dedicated to Pilar and Soledad, from Errigoiti.
- Cantata Colón (2005–06). For Choir, Bass (soloist), narrator and Big Orchestra. Diego Civilotti's poems.
- Robaiyyat (2010). For Mixed Choir and Big Orchestra. Omar Jayyam's Robaiyyat

=== Concert band ===
- Las medias de los flamencos (1982). Suite for Wind Band and narrator on a Horacio Quiroga's Tale.
- Viaje a la Luna (1995). Phantasy for Symphony Band in Five Scenes about the Federico García Lorca's Screenplay
- Impromptu, recuerdo y danza (2007) for Bassoon and Symphony Band)
- Sur/fantasía (2010). Concertante Phantasy for Bandoneon, violin and Concert Band.

== Awards ==
- Ciutat de Tarragona International Award for Musical Composition
- Queen Sofía Composition Prize
- Ciutat de Barcelona Prize
- First Prize Juventudes Musicales-Barcelona
- TRINAC Prize Argentina
- Composition Prize Casa de las Américas (finalist).
