= Antonio Gallego =

- Born: Antonio Gallego Gallego; 21 April 1942
- Died: 19 February 2024 (aged 81)
- Occupations: Writer, musicologist

Antonio Gallego Gallego (21 April 1942 – 19 February 2024) was a Spanish writer and musicologist.

== Life and career ==
Antonio Gallego was born in Zamora, Spain, on 21 April 1942. He was raised in La Vera. He studied at the Colegio Sagrado Corazón of the Society of Jesus in Carrión de los Condes, and music at the conservatories of Salamanca and Valladolid, law at the University of Salamanca, and arts at the Complutense University of Madrid. A disciple of Federico Sopeña, Gallego has been the Technical Secretary of the National Chalcography, a Professor of Aesthetics and History of Music at the Valencia Conservatory, and a Professor of Musicology at the Madrid Royal Conservatory. He directed the Cultural Services of the Fundación Juan March between 1980 and 2005. He was appointed a member of the Real Academia de Bellas Artes de San Fernando in 1996 and a member of the Real Academia Extremeña de las Letras y las Artes in 2002. A founding member of the Spanish Society of Musicology (SEdeM), Gallego directed its Journal between 1978 and 1980.

In 1992, he wrote the libretto for Miguel Ángel Coria's opera Belisa, adapted from García Lorca's play Amor de Don Perlimplín con Belisa en su jardín. The work premiered on May 15, 1992, at the Teatro de la Zarzuela in Madrid.

== El amor brujo ==
El amor brujo, one of the most important works of Manuel de Falla, was first performed in April 1915 in Madrid, Spain. Falla continued to work on the music until completing the 1925 version premiered in Paris, France. Both the original 1915 score and the following 1916 version were considered lost.

In 1986, Antonio Gallego was commissioned to compile a catalog of Manuel de Falla's works kept in his archive. During this task Gallego recovered the original 1915 version from sketches. The reconstruction process is detailed in his book Manuel de Falla y El amor brujo.

== Works ==
Gallego published many articles and a dozen books including:

- La música en el Museo del Prado (The Music in the Prado Museum), 1972
- Música y Sociedad (Music and Society), 1977
- Catálogo de los dibujos de la Calcografía Nacional, 1978
- Historia del grabado en España (History of Spanish Engraving), 1979
- Catálogo de obras de Manuel de Falla (Manuel de Falla Works Catalog), 1987
- La música en tiempos de Carlos III (Music in the times of Charles III), 1989
- Manuel de Falla y El amor brujo, 1990
- Historia de la Música II (History of Music), 1997
- El arte de Joaquín Rodrigo (The art of Joaquin Rodrigo), 2003
- Al son del roncón. La música en los poetas asturianos (Music and the Asturian Poets), 2006
