= Marisa Manchado =

Spanish composer (1956–2026)

- Manchado, in c. 2000
- Born: María Luisa Manchado Torres; 7 July 1956; Madrid, Spain
- Died: 28 October 2026 (aged 70); Los Yébenes, Spain
- Education: Madrid Royal Conservatory
- Occupations: Composer; Pianist; Academic teacher
- Organizations: Teresa Berganza Conservatory; Autonomous University of Madrid; Instituto Nacional de las Artes Escénicas y de la Música
- Awards: Premio Nacional de Música

María Luisa Manchado Torres (7 July 1956 – 28 October 2026) was a Spanish classical composer, pianist and academic who advocated for gender equality in classical music. Born in Madrid, she composed operas, orchestral works, vocal music, chamber music, and electroacoustics, and also wrote pedagogical works. She taught for decades at the Teresa Berganza Conservatory in Madrid and at the faculty of education of the Autonomous University of Madrid. She served as the deputy director general of the department for music and dance of the Instituto Nacional de las Artes Escénicas y de la Música (INAEM).

Manchado was awarded the 2024 Premio Nacional de Música for her third opera, La Regenta. She also promoted the work of women composers through radio broadcasts, books and involvement in musical organisations. She died in the 2026 Toledo train collision.

== Life and career ==
María Luisa Manchado Torres was born in Madrid on 7 July 1956. She studied piano, composition and harmony in Italy from 1975 to 1977, and studied at the Madrid Royal Conservatory with Carmelo Bernaola, graduating in 1983 with a degree in composition and an honourable mention. Manchado studied further at the University of Paris, and with Antón García Abril, Luis de Pablo and Brian Ferneyhough. She received a scholarship to attend the Darmstädter Ferienkurse and take a course by Olivier Messiaen in Avignon in 1986. She earned a degree in psychology from the Comillas Pontifical University in Madrid and a maîtrise degree in music sciences and computer-assisted composition at Paris 8 University in Saint-Denis. She achieved a PhD in musicology at the Complutense University of Madrid; her thesis, about the Laboratory of Musical Informatics and Electronics (LIEM) of the Centre for the Promotion of Contemporary Music, won the 2021 SGAE Foundation Prize for the best doctoral thesis.

Her oeuvre includes more than 150 works: pedagogical music, orchestral music, chamber music, vocal music, and electroacoustics. She composed choral works such as The Pink Tree for soprano, choir, and orchestra, and La Cité des dames for women's choir and piano. She completed three operas: El cristal de agua fría to a libretto by Rosa Montero; Escenas de la vida cotidiana to a libretto by Elena Montaña, which premiered at the 1997 Madrid Autumn Festival; and La Regenta, based on the novel of the same name by Clarín, to a libretto by Amelia Valcárcel. Valcárcel, a philosopher, focused the plot on a 19th-century heroine. La Regenta was premiered by the Teatro Real in Madrid in 2023, in a co-production with the Teatro Español at the Naves del Español in Matadero Madrid. Manchado derived an orchestral suite, Un mar de hielo (A sea of ice), from it, which premiered in April 2025 in a performance by the Spanish National Orchestra. She was working on a fourth opera, Medea, when she died.

She composed a concerto for two pianos and orchestra in 2002, and a concert at the Auditorio Nacional de Música in Madrid was dedicated to her compositions. In 2006, she composed a film score to the 1928 silent film La Passion de Jeanne d'Arc directed by Carl Theodor Dreyer, on a commission from the Teatro de la Zarzuela and the Orquesta de la Comunidad de Madrid. Her Bassoon Concerto Notas para la paz (Notes for Peace) was commissioned by the Spanish National Orchestra. Its premiere featured Enrique Abargues Morán as soloist and was conducted by Kazushi Ōno.

Manchado co-created a radio programme on women in music (Mujeres en la música), which was broadcast in 1983. She published a book about her studies of gender and power in music, Música y mujeres, género y poder, in 1998. She taught at the Teresa Berganza Conservatory in Madrid from 1994, serving as deputy principal until 2017. Manchado was a co-founder of the Madrid Association of Composers in 1998 and became its first president. From 2001 to 2004, she was a professor at the faculty of education of the Autonomous University of Madrid. She served as the deputy director general of the department for music and dance of the Instituto Nacional de las Artes Escénicas y de la Música (INAEM) from 2007 to 2008. She published a book in 2023, Mis queridas genias!, about the women composers who had influenced her thinking and work.

Manchado received the Daniel Montorio National Prize in 1995 and the Comuarte Ibero-American Music Prize in 2007. In 2024, she was awarded the Premio Nacional de Música in the composition category for her opera La Regenta. The jury reasoned that her work was "an updated reading of a classic of universal literature, through which she gives voice to an iconic female character, which underlines the composer’s long commitment to equality".

== Death ==
Manchado was reported missing after the 2026 Toledo train collision on 28 October 2026, and her death was confirmed on 31 October. She was 70 and had been en route to the University of Seville to take part in a conference on her music.
