= Joan Magrané Figuera =

Catalan composer

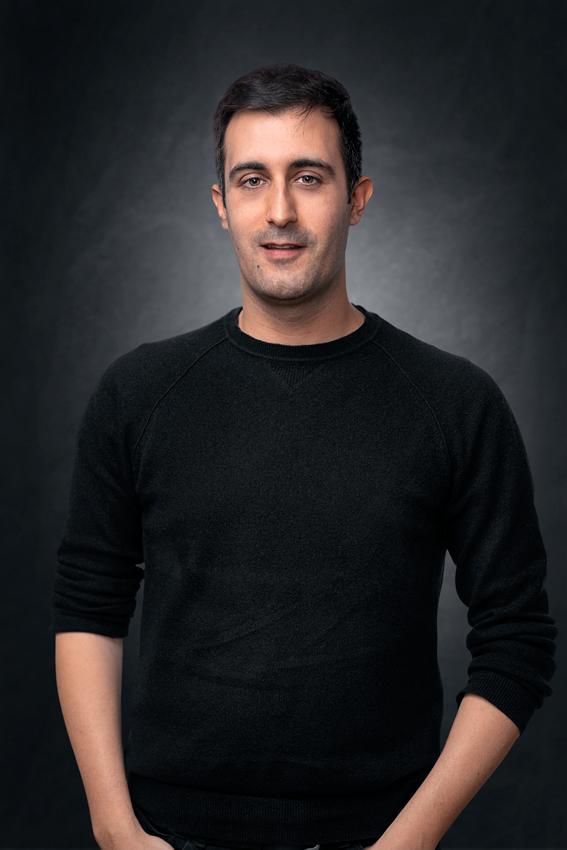
Joan Magrané Figuera

Joan Magrané Figuera (born in 1988, Reus) is a Spanish composer.

== Biography ==
Joan Magrané Figuera started to study composition with Ramon Humet. Subsequently, he studied at Esmuc in Barcelona with Agustín Charles, at the Graz Kunts Universität with Beat Furrer and then moved to Paris, where he attended lessons by Stefano Gervasoni at the Conservatoire National Supérieur de Musique et de Danse. His music has been performed around Europe by orchestras, groups and soloists such as Ensemble Intercontemporain, BBC Scottish Symphony Orchestra, Quatuor Diotima, Barcelona Symphony Orchestra, RTVE Symphony Orchestra, Neue Vocalsolisten, Quartet Gerhard, and many others. The year 2016 he was lauréat of the Villa Medici in Rome. He has been awarded several composition prizes among them the XXXI Queen Sofia Composition Prize in 2014. Since 2017 he has been president of the Federació Joventuts Musicals de Catalunya.

== Works (selection) ==
- Diàlegs de Tirant e Carmesina (2018/2019), chamber opera
- Tombeau, violoncello (2018)
- Fantasiestück, piano (2018)
- Oració, 8 voices (2018)
- Era, 3rd string quartet (2018)
- Faula, ensemble (2017)
- Estris de llum, sax quartet (2017)
- Marines i boscatges, ensemble (2016)
- Fragments d'Ausiàs March, five male voices and ensemble (2016)
- Double (swans reflecting elephants), piano (2015/16)
- Swing, six voices, 3 percussionist, violin, viola and cello (2015/16)
- Frammenti da Michelangelo, baritone and ensemble (2013/15)
- Un triptyque voilé, string trio (2014)
- Uns fragments d'aparicions, violin and electronics (2013/14)
- Alguns cants òrfics, 2nd string quartet (2013)
- Madrigal, 1st string quartet (2012)
- ...secreta desolación..., orchestra (2012)

== Discography ==
- 2019:
  - Diferencias sobre El canto del caballero (Soledad sonora, Initiale), Jesús Noguera.
  - Tres poesies de Bartomeu Rosselló-Pòrcel (Legacy, Seedmusic), Anna Alàs i Alexander Fleischer.
  - Si en lo mal temps la serena be canta (Cueurs Desolez, Ibs Classical), Carlos Mena i Iñaki Alberdi.
  - Oració (Epistulae ad Sagittarium, Ficta), Ensemble O Vos Omnes, Xavier Pastrana.
  - Caça nocturna (Offertorium, Seedmusic), Barcelona Clarinet Players.
- 2018:
  - Via (Truth, Ibs Classical), Ángel Soria.
  - Via (Made in Barcelona, La mà de Guido), Joan-Martí Frasquier.
- 2013:
  - Visiones (Visiones, Verso), Mario Prisuelos.
