= Gabriel Erkoreka =

Spanish musician

Gabriel Erkoreka (born 1969, Bilbao) is a Spanish composer, pianist, and professor of composition at Musikene. He was awarded the Premio Nacional de Música of Spain in 2021, and won the Queen Sofía Composition Prize in 2007.
