= José Eugenio Olavide =

Spanish dermatologist

José Eugenio Olavide (1831-1901) has been described as the founder of dermatology in Spain. He found himself in charge of the 120 beds of the San Juan de Dios Hospital and was forced to teach himself dermatology, having previously taken no special interest in it. He was influenced by the work of Ernest Bazin.
