= Juan José Falcón Sanabria =

Spanish conductor and composer (born 1936)

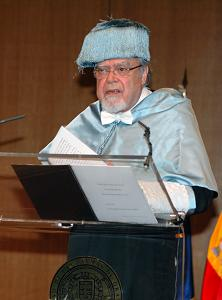
Juan José Falcón Sanabria

Juan José Falcón Sanabria (Las Palmas 1936) is a Spanish conductor and composer.

Falcón Sanabria conducts the Coral Polifónica de Las Palmas and Orquesta Filarmónica de Gran Canaria.

== Own works, editions ==
- Opera La hija del cielo (2007).
- Sanabria Atlántica; Elan; Sinfonia Urbana Col Legno.

== As conductor of other composers ==
- Polifonía Española del S. XX. vol. I Gofio
