= Virginia Martínez =

Spanish conductor (born 1979)

- Born: 1979 (age 46–47); Molina de Segura, Murcia, Spain
- Website: virginiamartinez.eu

Virginia Martínez (born 1979 in Molina de Segura, Región de Murcia) is a Spanish conductor. She conducts the Region of Murcia's Young orchestra.

== Biography ==
When she was 13 she was appointed "Hims Mola Children's Choir" conductor, in Molina de Segura until 1999. She made many courses about choral conduction and orchestral conduction. In 1999 she began to study Orchestral Conduction degree in Vienne's Conservatory, having Reinhard Schwarz and Georg Mark as teachers, ending its studies in June 2003. In February 2003 she conducted Markus Preisl's Deus ex Machina (a contemporary work) with the Group of Contemporary Music From Vienne's Conservatory.

She performed with the Stefan Holl's Winterlandschaft in April 2003.
