= Israel David Martínez =

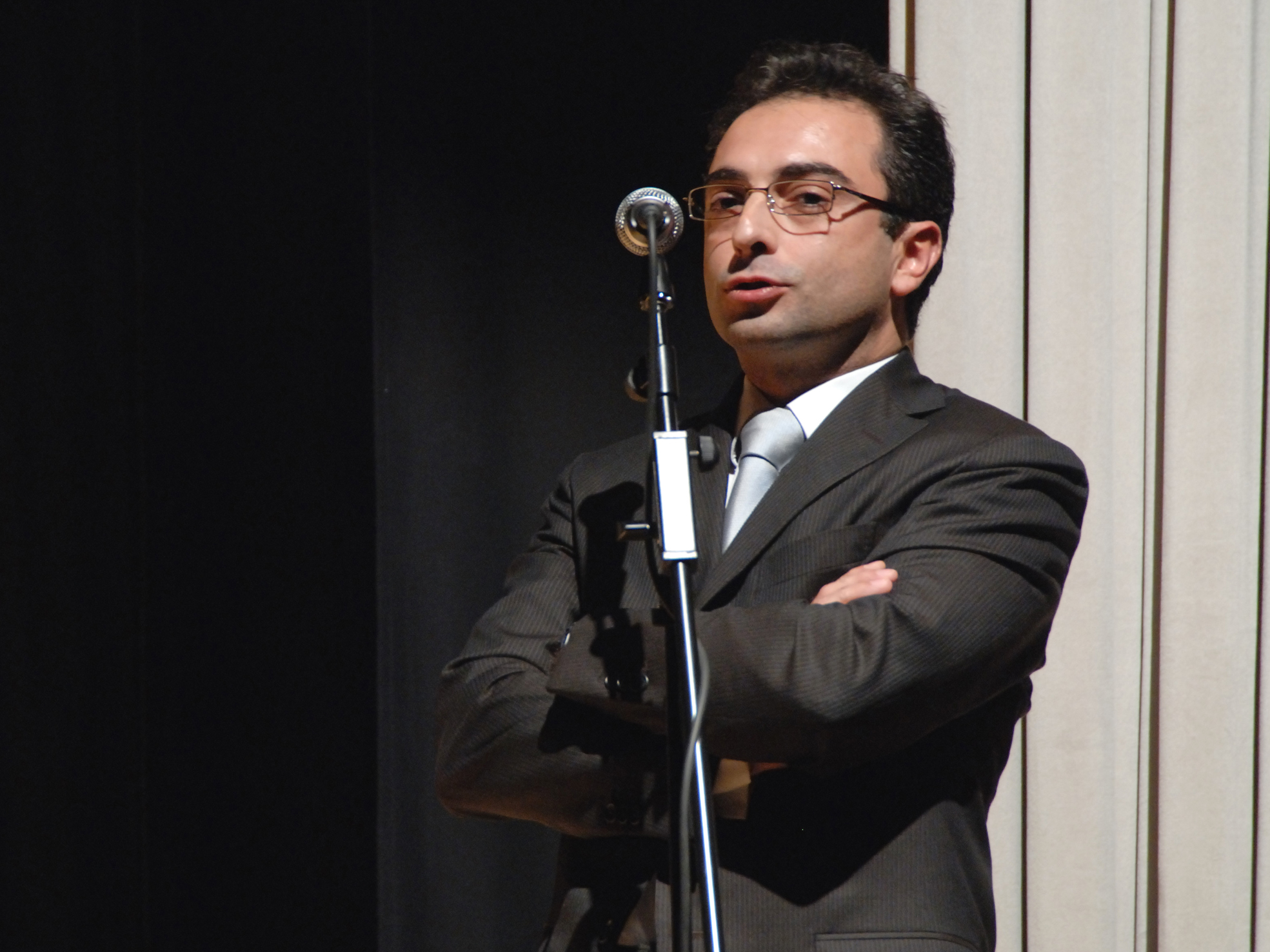
- Martinez in 2011
- Born: March 3, 1969 (age 57)
- Occupation: Video game composer

Israel David Martinez (March 3, 1969) Spanish video game composer born and living in Barcelona.
