= José Luis Turina =

Spanish composer

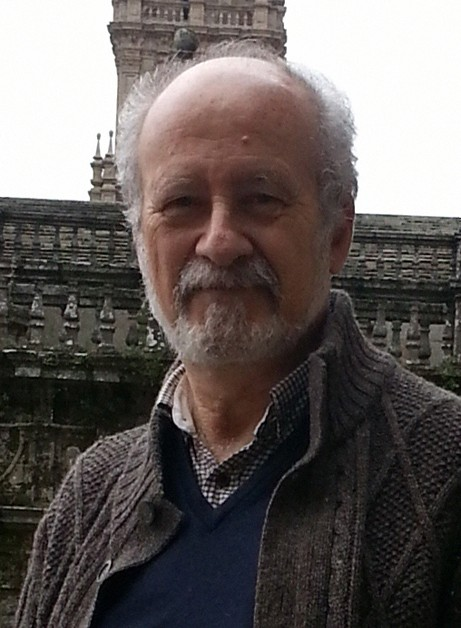
José Luis Turina (Santiago de Compostela, October 2015)

José Luis Turina (born 1952, in Madrid) is a Spanish composer, grandson of Joaquín Turina.

He studied composition under Antón García Abril, Román Alís, Rodolfo Halffter and Carmelo Bernaola at the conservatories of Barcelona and Madrid, and then, with a grant from the Spanish Ministry for Foreign Affairs for studying at the Spanish Fine Arts Academy in Rome, he attended the classes in composition given by Franco Donatoni at the Accademia di Santa Cecilia.

In 1981, his work Meeting Point won the First Prize in the International Composition Contest organised by the Orchestra of the Valencia Conservatory to mark their first centenary. In 1986 he won the First Prize of the Musical Composition Contest "Queen Sofía", from the Ferrer Salat Foundation, with his piece Ocnos (orchestral music on poems by Luis Cernuda). He was awarded Spain's Premio Nacional de Música for composition in 1996.

Teacher of Harmony in the Conservatories of Cuenca and Madrid since 1981, in 1993 he was designated technical advisor of the Ministry for Education and Science, for the reformation of musical teaching in the realm of the new education law of 1990. In February 2001 he was appointed artistic director of the Spanish National Youth Orchestra, position he held until his retirement in March 2020, and from 2004 until 2015 he was the President of the Spanish Association of Youth Orchestras. In April 2023 he entered as a member of the Music Section of the San Fernando Royal Academy of Fine Arts.

In September 2000 the world premiere of his opera D. Q. (Don Quijote in Barcelona), on a text by Justo Navarro and in a production by La Fura dels Baus, took place in the Gran Teatre del Liceu (Barcelona, Spain). In November 2001 the Tokyo String Quartet played with great success the world premiere of his string quartet "Clémisos y Sustalos", written as a commission for them. In October 2004, the Brodsky Quartet premiered his string quartet "The Seven Last Words of Jesus Christ on the Cross" in Cadiz. In January 2006, he was the focus of the Contemporary Music Cycle of the Málaga Philharmonic Orchestra, which played 18 of his compositions, and released both an extensive biographical study and a CD of five of his orchestral pieces.

== Selected works ==
Opera & stage works

- Ligazon (1981–82), chamber opera in one act and 5 scenes, based on a play by Ramón del Valle-Inclán, premiered 2 July 1982, in Cuenca.
- La raya en el agua (1995–95). Premiere: 26 September 1996, Círculo de Bellas Artes, Madrid
- D.Q. (Don Quijote en Barcelona) (1998–99); Opera in 3 acts, based on the Miguel de Cervantes novel Don Quixote; libretto by Justo Navarro, staged by La Fura dels Baus at the Liceu, Barcelona. (2 October 2000)
- Tour de Manivelle (2006–2007), music theatre work for actress, orchestra and video, texts by the composer and five short films by Segundo de Chomón. Premiere: May 2008, Teatro de la Zarzuela, Madrid.

Orchestral

- Punto de encuentro (1979)
- Pentimento (1983)
- Fantasía sobre una Fantasía de Alonso Mudarra (1989)
- El arpa y la sombra (1991)
- Música fugitiva (1992)
- Fantasía sobre doce notas (1994)
- Dos danzas sinfónicas (1996)
- La Commedia dell'Arte (2007)

Concertante

- Ocnos (orchestral music on poems by Luis Cernuda) (1982–84), for speaker, cello and orchestra
- Concierto para violín y orquesta (1987)
- Variaciones y desavenencias sobre temas de Boccherini (1988), concerto for harpsichord and orchestra
- Concierto para piano y orquesta (1997)
- Concerto da chiesa (1998), for cello and strings
- Cuatro sonetos de Shakespeare (2001–2002), for soprano and orchestra
- Concierto para marimba y cuerdas (2012)

Choir & Orchestra

- Exequias (In memoriam Fernando Zóbel) (1984), choir and chamber orchestra
- Musica ex lingua (1989), on texts by Agustín García Calvo, Lope de Vega, Luis de Góngora, José Bergamín, Ramón del Valle-Inclán and Francisco de Quevedo
- Tres villancicos (2006)

Choir

- Para saber si existo (1979), on poems by Gabriel Celaya
- Per la morte di un capolavoro (1995), on a poem by Gabriele D'Annunzio
- Canzon de cuna pra Rosalía Castro, morta (2003), on poems by Rosalía de Castro and Federico García Lorca
- Ritirata notturna (2009)

Accompanied voice

- Epílogo del misterio (1979), on poems by José Bergamín (mezzo-soprano and piano)
- Primera antolojía (1979), on poems by Juan Ramón Jiménez (soprano and piano)
- Tres sonetos (1992), on poems by Lope de Vega, Luis de Góngora and Francisco de Quevedo (low voice, clarinet, violin/viola and piano)
- Tres poemas cantados (1993), on poems by Federico García Lorca (soprano and piano)
- Canción apócrifa (1994), on a poem by Antonio Machado (soprano and piano)
- Cinco canciones amatorias (1994), on poems by Catalan writers of 14th-16th centuries (soprano and piano or strings)
- En forma de cuento (1994), on a poem by Rafael Alberti
- Callada partida (2013), on a poem by Conchita Colón (mezzo and piano sextet)
- Nada te turbe (2014), on a poem by Santa Teresa (narrator and piano)
- Cinco canciones verdes (2016), on poems by Safo, Delmira Agustini, Giuseppe Gioacchino Belli, Rainer Maria Rilke and Catulo (soprano and piano)
- Salomé, cáliz vacío (2016), on poems by Delmira Agustini, texts by Oscar Wilde y excerpts from Salomé de Richard Strauss (soprano/actress and piano)
- Soneto Quasi una Fantasía (2017), on the sonnet "A Beethoven" by Gerardo Diego (soprano and piano)

Chamber

- Movimiento (1978), for violin and piano
- Crucifixus (1978), for 20 strings and piano
- Homenaje a Cesar Franck (1979), for wind quintet
- Iniciales (1980), for flute and piano
- Título a determinar (1980), for septet
- Fantasía sobre "Don Giovanni" (1980), for piano four-hands
- Trio (1982), for violin, cello and piano
- Variaciones sobre dos temas de Scarlatti (2005), for sextet
- Cuarteto en sol (1985), for string quartet
- La Commedia dell'Arte (1986), for flute, viola and guitar, and (1990), for flute, viola and harp
- Variaciones sobre un tema de Prokofiev (1986), for bassoon and piano
- Sonata da chiesa (1986–87), for viola and piano
- Divertimento, aria y serenata (1987), for viola octet, and (1991), for cello octet
- Dos duetos (1988), for cello and piano, and (1992), for viola and piano
- Kammerconcertante (1988), for flute in g, bass clarinet, violin, viola, cello and double-bass
- Seis metaplasmos (1990), for two violins
- Variaciones y tema (series 1 & 2), sobre el Tema con variaciones "Ah, vous dirai-je, maman!", de W. A. Mozart (1990), for violin and piano, and (2008), for two pianos
- Túmulo de la mariposa (1991), for clarinet, cello and piano
- Sonata y Toccata (1991), for piano four-hands
- Rosa engalanada (1992), for flute and guitar
- Cuatro cuartetos (1994), for basset-horn quartet
- Tres palíndromos (1996), for piano four-hands
- Scherzo para un hobbit (1997), for quintet
- PasoDoppio (1999), for clarinet and cello
- Paráfrasis sobre "Don Giovanni" (2000), for cello octet
- Clémisos y Sustalos (2001), for string quartet
- Tres tercetos (2003), for violin, cello and piano
- Octeto de agua (2004), wind octet
- Las siete últimas palabras de Jesucristo en la cruz (2004), for string quartet
- Sonata (2004), for violin and piano
- Viaggio di Parnaso (2005), for violin, cello and piano
- Cinco quintetos (2005), for brass quintet
- Hércules y Cronos (2008), for brass and percussion ensemble
- Danzas entrelazadas (2011), for flute, clarinet, percussion and piano sextet
- Die Windsbraut (2012), for wind quintet
- Paganini 24 (2013), for nonet
- Encore alla turca (2014), for nonet
- Burlesca (2015), for clarinet and piano sextet
- Seis fragmentos de "D.Q. (Don Quijote en Barcelona)" (2016), for wind quintet
- El juego del Cíclope (2017), for trombone and harp
- Bach in excelsis (2017), for string quartet
- Consolación (2018), for french horn and piano
- El viento que nunca duerme (2019), for flute, violin, viola and cello

Solo

- Copla de cante jondo (1980), for guitar
- ¡Ya "uté" ve...! (1982), for piano
- En volandas (1982), for cello
- Dubles (1983), for flute
- Scherzo (1986), for piano
- Amb "P" de Pau (1986), for piano
- Cinco preludios a un tema de Chopin (1987), for piano
- Cuatro estudios en forma de pieza (1989), for guitar
- Cuatro estudios en forma de pieza (1989), for guitar
- Due essercizi (1989), for harpsichord
- Punto de órgano (1990), for organ
- Notas dormidas (1992), for harp
- Monólogos del viento y de la roca (1993), for guitar
- Preludio sobreesdrújulo (1994), for guitar
- Toccata (Homenaje a Manuel de Falla) (1995), for piano
- L'art d'être touché par le clavecin (Sonata para clave) (2000), for harpsichord
- Homenaje a Isaac Albéniz (I. Jaén) (2001), for piano
- Partita (2001), for double-bass
- Catdenza (2003), for clarinet
- Soliloquio (in memoriam Joaquim Homs) (2004), for piano
- Saeta (2006), for marimba
- Homenaje a Isaac Albéniz (II. León) (2009), for piano
- Dos cuadros de Marc Chagall (2009), for violin
- Homenaje a Isaac Albéniz (III. Salamanca) (2010), for piano
- Arboretum (2010), for guitar
- El guardián entre los pinos (2011), for piano
- Collage, (on the Prelude #20 and the 24 Preludes by Chopin) (2014), for piano
- Jeu du solitaire (2012), for violin
- Viola joke (2017), capriccio for viola

Discography (selection)

- Crucifixus (1978), for 20 strings and piano
- Epílogo del misterio (1979), on poems by José Bergamín (mezzo-soprano and piano)
- Punto de encuentro (1979), for orchestra
- Primera antolojía (1979), on poems by Juan Ramón Jiménez (soprano and piano)
- Copla de cante jondo (1980), for guitar
- Fantasía sobre "Don Giovanni" (1980), for piano four-hands
- Título a determinar (1980), for septet
- Iniciales (1980), for flute and piano
- En volandas (1982), for solo cello
- Trio (1982), for violin, cello and piano
- Pentimento (1983), for orchestra
- Ocnos (orchestral music on poems by Luis Cernuda) (1982–84), for speaker, cello and orchestra
- Exequias (In memoriam Fernando Zóbel) (1985), for choir and chamber orchestra
- Variaciones sobre dos temas de Scarlatti (1985), for sextet
- Amb "P" de Pau (1986), for piano
- Scherzo (1986), for piano
- Concierto para violín y orquesta (1987)
- Kammerconcertante (1988), for alto flute, bass clarinet and string quartet
- Fantasía sobre una Fantasía de Alonso Mudarra (1989), for orchestra
- Musica ex lingua (1989), for choir and orchestra
- Dos duetos (1989), for viola and piano
- Due essercizi (1989), for harpsichord
- Cuarteto con piano (1990)
- El arpa y la sombra (1991), for orchestra
- Túmulo de la mariposa (1991), for clarinet, cello and piano
- Música fugitiva (1992), for orchestra
- Rosa engalanada (1992), for flute and guitar
- Monólogos del viento y de la roca (1993), for guitar
- Fantasía sobre doce notas (1994), for orchestra
- Dos danzas sinfónicas (1996), for orchestra
- Concierto para piano y orquesta (1997)
- Scherzo para un hobbit (1997), for quintet
- D.Q. (Don Quijote en Barcelona) (1998–99), opera
- L'art d'être touché par le clavecin (Sonata para clave) (2000), for harpsichord
- Homenaje a Isaac Albéniz (I. Jaén) (2001), for piano
- Octeto de agua (2004), for wind octet
- Soliloquio (in memoriam Joaquim Homs) (2004), for piano
- Cinco quintetos (2005), for brass quintet
- La Commedia dell'arte (2007), for orchestra
- Homenaje a Isaac Albéniz (II. León) (2009), for piano
- Collage, (on the Prelude #20 and the 24 Preludes by Chopin) (2014), for piano
- Dos cuadros de Marc Chagall (2009), for violin
- Exequias (In memoriam Fernando Zóbel) (1984) for choir and chamber orchestra
- Viola joke (2017), capriccio for viola
