= Jesús Rueda (composer) =

Spanish composer

Jesús Rueda Azcuaga (born in Madrid, 30 May 1961) is a Spanish composer. He won the 2004 National Prize for the global quality of his music, with special recognition to his recently premiered symphonic and chamber compositions, such as his Symphony No. 2 and his String Quartet No. 3. His Symphony No. 3, Viaje imaginario (dedicated to his teacher Francisco Guerrero following his death) and a selection of his piano music, including his two sonatas, were subsequently published by Naxos Records played by the Indonesian composer and pianist Ananda Sukarlan.

Through his career he has evolved from experimental music to a more mainstream style. He is the resident composer of the Cadaqués Orchestra, and a regular juror of the Queen Sofía Prize.

== Compositions ==
=== Opera & Stage ===
- Fragmento de Orfeo (2006)
- Se vende - Zarzuela (2020)
- Raja la alondra - Zarzuela (2022)

=== Orchestral ===
- Fons Vitae (1994)
- Viaje imaginario (1998)
- Jardín mecánico (1999) for Strings
- Hyperión 1 (2001)
- Elephant Skin (2002)
- Islas (2004) for Strings
- El viaje múltiple (2005)
- Hyperión 2 (2006)
- La Tierra (2006)
- Divertimento (2018)
- Stairscape (2018)
- Vísperas (2024)

=== Symphonies ===
- Symphony No. 1 ″Laberinto″ (2000)
- Symphony No. 2 ″Acerca del límite″ (2002)
- Symphony No. 3 ″Luz″ (2006)
- Symphony No. 4 ″July″ (2017)
- Symphony No. 5 ″Naufragios″ (2019)
- Symphony No. 6 ″Fuga en las tinieblas″ (2020)
- Symphony No. 7 ″Northern Visions″ (2021)
- Symphony No. 8 “Elegy” (2021)
- Symphony No. 9 “Oblivion” (2022)
- Symphony No. 10 “La era real” (2022)
- Symphony No. 11 “The Way-El Camino” (2023)
- Symphony No. 12 “Oceana” (2023)
- Symphony No. 13 “Memory and Desire” (2024)
- Symphony No. 14 (2024)
- Symphony No. 15 (2025)
- Symphony No. 16 (2025)

=== Concertante ===
- Sinamay for Piano & Five Instruments (1991)
- Cadenza for Piano & Ensemble (1997)
- Fantasia for Clarinet & Orch. (2016)
- Piano Concerto n.1 “Three days of september”
- Piano Concerto n.2 “Nirvana Concert”
- Piano Concerto n.3 “Rivers in Winter”
- Piano Concerto n.4 (2024)
- Piano Concerto n.5 (2025)
- Cello Concerto (2023)
- Violin Concerto n.1 (2024)
- Violin Concerto n.2 (2025)

=== Iberia Orchestrations ===
- Triana, Albéniz/Rueda
- Evocación, Albéniz/Rueda
- Lavapiés, Albéniz/Rueda
- El Puerto, Albéniz/Rueda
- Rondeña, Albéniz/Rueda
- Eritaña, Albéniz/Rueda

=== Ensemble ===
- Chamber Concerto No. 1 ″Présages″ (1990)
- Mas la noche (1991)
- Arrecife (1992)
- Un vent noire (1992)
- Dos sonetos (1993)
- Chamber Concerto No. 2 “Duraton Oaks” (1997)
- Chamber Concerto No. 3 ″En el Corral de Comedias de Almagro″ (2001)
- Chamber Concerto No. 4 ″Simple Games″ (2022)

=== Chamber music ===
- Microsecuencias (1985)
- YAM (1986)
- Una leyenda (1990)
- Bitácora, for piano quintet (1992)
- Ítaca (1997)
- Perpetuum Mobile for percussion duo (1998)
- El diario de Fausto (1999)
- Memoria del laberinto (2000)
- 3 Expressive Etudes for steel drums (2004)
- 8 Love Songs (2004)
- Obsesión (2004)
- Pocket Paradise (2008)
- Your Story (2014)
- Absolute! (2014)
- The Messenger (2015)
- Persiles (2016)
- Holstebro Quintet, for piano quintet (2016)
- Natura Morta (2019)
- Bernat Quintet, for vibraphone & string quartet (2025)

=== String Quartet ===
- String Quartet No. 1 (1990)
- String Quartet No. 2 ″Desde las sombras″ (2003)
- String Quartet No. 3 ″Islas″ (2004)
- String Quartet No. 4 ″Still Life″ (2018)
- String Quartet No. 5 ″Fragments″ (2019)
- String Quartet No. 6 ″The Glare″ (2019)
- String Quartet No. 7 ″The Journey″ (2020)
- String Quartet No. 8 ″Nostalgia″ (2020)
- String Quartet No. 9 ″Metamorphosis″ (2020)
- String Quartet No. 10 ″Copenhagen″ (2020)
- String Quartet No. 11 "On the way of Bee" (2021)
- String Quartet No. 12 "Afterthoughs" (2021)
- String Quartet No. 13 "Madrid" (2021)
- String Quartet No. 14 "Good Old Days (Rome)" (2021)
- String Quartet No. 15 "The Endless Shore" (2021)
- String Quartet No. 16 "Las semanas del jardín" (2022)
- String Quartet No. 17 "Nothingness" (2022)
- String Quartet No. 18 "The Naked Horizon" (2023)
- String Quartet No. 19 "Amor constante más allá de la muerte" (2023)

=== Vocal ===
- Salmo Responsoriale (2000)
- Demasiado tarde Requiem Mass, libreto J.M.Sicilia, with D.del Puerto & J.Arias (2024)

=== Solo ===
==== Cello ====
- Io (1989)
- Hocquetus (2005)
- Sex Machine (2007)

==== Flute ====
- Designio de bruma Bass Flute & electr. (1986)
- Suspiria (1988)
- Vértigo (1992)

==== Guitar ====
- Remembrance (1996)
- Quaderno d'Estate (2007)

==== Percussion ====
- Luna nueva (2000)
- 11 Inventions for young accordionists (2004)
- Etude for marimba (2007)

==== Piano ====
- Six Etudes (1989)
- Five Miniatures (1995)
- Ricercata (1995)
- Mephisto (1999)
- 24 Interludes (2003)
- 29 Inventions (2003)
- Five Impromptus (2009)
- Los dos amigos, story and drawings by J.Rueda (2011)
- Four easy pieces (2011)
- El faro musical 1, story and drawings by Mette Perregaard (2020)
- El faro musical 2, story and drawings by Mette Perregaard (2020)
- El faro musical 3, story and drawings by Mette Perregaard (2021)
- El faro musical 4, story and drawings by Mette Perregaard (2021)
- El faro musical 5, story and drawings by Mette Perregaard (2021)

==== Piano Sonatas ====
- Piano Sonata No. 1 (1991)
- Piano Sonata No. 2 ″Ketjak″ (2005, written for the Indonesian pianist & composer Ananda Sukarlan)
- Piano Sonata No. 3 “Upon a Ground” (2016)
- Piano Sonata No. 4 “Night Thoughts” (2017)
- Piano Sonata No. 5 “The Butterfly Effect” (2018)
- Piano Sonata No. 6 “On the Edge” (2018)
- Piano Sonata No. 7 “Isola T.” (2022)
- Piano Sonata No. 8 “Plaka” (2022)
- Piano Sonata No. 9 (2024)
- Piano Sonata No. 10 “Vanishing Point” (2024)
- Piano Sonata No. 11 “Moebius” (2024)
- Piano Sonata No. 12 “Una vida” (2025)
- Piano Sonata No. 13 (2025)
- Piano Sonata No. 14 (2025)

==== Violin ====
- Sex Machine (2007)

=== Electronic music ===
- Synthiludia (1985)
- Sobre un fondo de luto descolorido (1986)
- Fragmento final (1987)
- Voyager (1988)
- Estacionario (fantasy for piano and electronics) (1989)

=== Film Music, Soundtrack ===
- La viuda del capitán Estrada, (J.L.Cuerda) With Del Puerto and J.Arias.
- La marrana, (J.L.Cuerda) With Del Puerto and J.Arias.
- Tocando fondo, (J.L.Cuerda) With Del Puerto, J.Arias and C.Camarero.
- Frankenstein: Day of the Beast (Ricardo Islas), 2011
- La lengua en pedazos, (J.Mayorga)
