= Josep Soler (composer) =

Spanish composer, writer and music theorist (1935–2022)

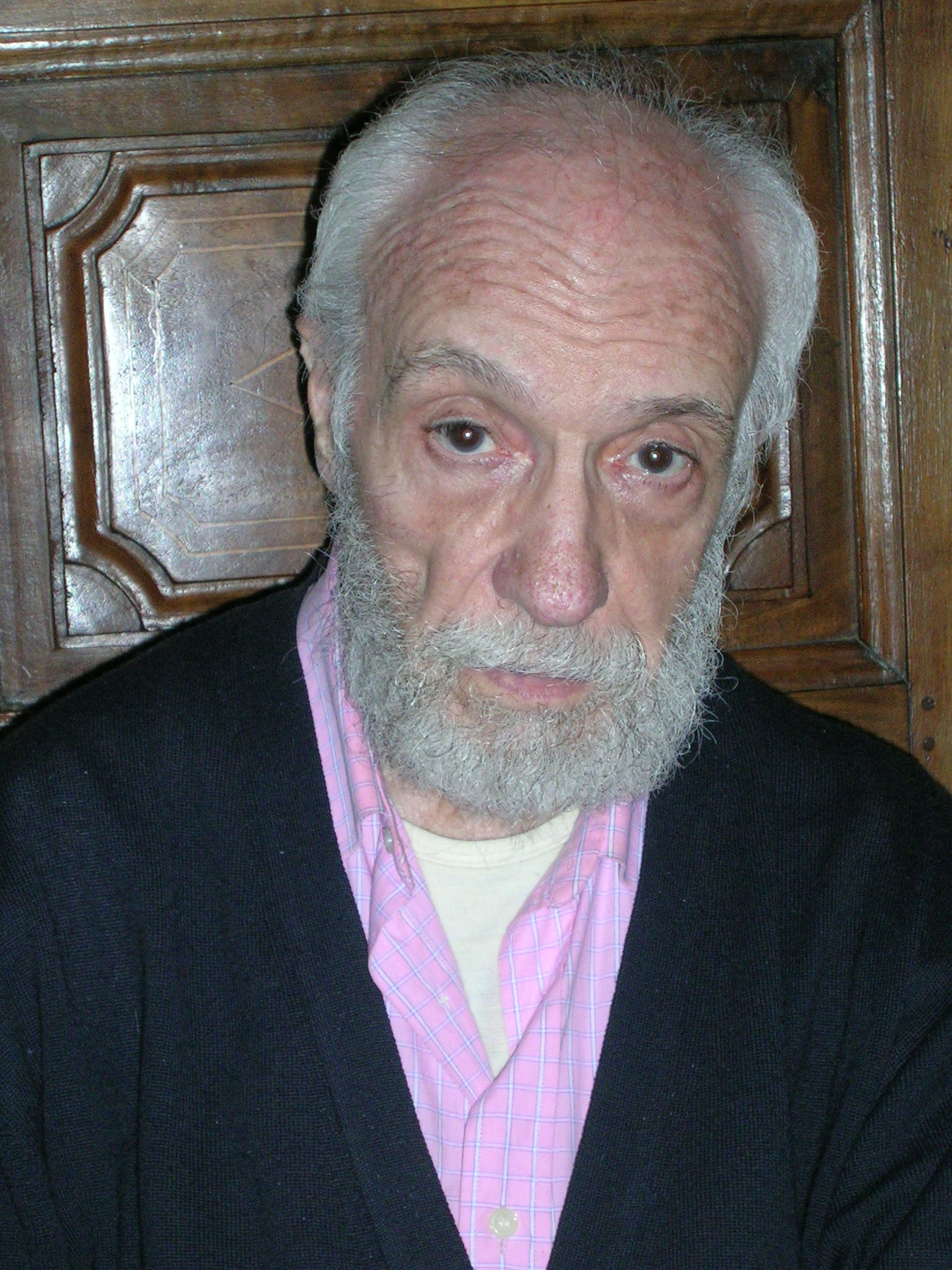
Josep Soler i Sardà

Josep Soler i Sardà (25 March 1935 – 9 October 2022) was a Catalonian/Spanish composer, writer, music theorist, and one of the main Catalan members of the Generación del 51.

== Life and career ==
Soler was born in Vilafranca del Penedès, Spain, on 25 March 1935. He studied composition and orchestration with Cristòfor Taltabull, and was also a pupil of René Leibowitz in Paris.

Soler's works include 16 operas, 7 symphonies, 3 piano concertos, 7 String Quartets, 16 Sonatas for piano and an orchestration of Isaac Albéniz's Pepita Jiménez, inter alia. Since 1982, he taught at the Reial Acadèmia Catalana de Belles Arts de Sant Jordi (Royal Catalan Academy of Fine Arts of Saint George) in Barcelona. His students included Benet Casablancas and Alejandro Civilotti.

In 2013, Soler was awarded the Gold Medal of Merit in Fine Arts awarded by the Spanish Ministry of Culture. He refused this honour, stating:

"Aceptar el reconocimiento sería aceptar la autoridad del Gobierno español, y yo no quiero saber nada del ministro Wert ni del gobierno de Rajoy, porque a ellos no les interesa en absoluto ni la cultura ni la educación." ("To acknowledge this recognition is to acknowledge the authority of the Spanish government, and I do not want anything to do with minister [José Ignacio] Wert and the government of [Prime Minister Mariano] Rajoy, because they are not interested at all in either culture or education.")

The personal papers of Josep Soler i Sardà are preserved in the Biblioteca de Catalunya.

Soler died on 9 October 2022, at the age of 87.

== Bibliography ==
- LEIBOWITZ, René. "Josep Soler" in CASARES, Emilio (ed.) "14 compositores españoles de hoy", Universidad de Oviedo, 1982, pp. 466–474.
- LEWINSKI, W.E. von. "Vier katalanische Komponisten in Barcelona", Melos, nº3, 1971, pp. 93–103.
- MEDINA, Ángel. Josep Soler. Música de la Pasión ICCMU. Madrid, 1998.
- SADIE, Stanley. "Josep Soler" in "The New Grove Dictionary of Opera". MacMillan. London, 1992.

Doctoral Theses

- Bruach Menchen, Agustí. Les òperes de Josep Soler. Autonomous University of Barcelona, 1997.
- Civilotti García, Diego (2017). La estética musical de Josep Soler (doctoralThesis). Autonomous University of Madrid, 2017.
- Roura, Teodor.La música vocal de Josep Soler. Escrits teòrics i obra musical. Autonomous University of Barcelona, 2017.

== Essays ==
- (1980) Fuga, técnica e historia
- (1982) La música
- (1983) Victoria
- (1994) Escritos sobre música y dos poemas
- (1999) Otros escritos y poemas
- (1999) Tiempo y Música (with Joan Cuscó)
- (2003) Nuevos escritos y poemas
- (2004) J.S. Bach. Una estructura del dolor
- (2006) Música y Ética
- (2011) Musica Enchiriadis
- (2014) "Últimos escritos"

== Awards ==
- Prize "Opera de Montecarlo" (1964);
- Prize Ciudad de Barcelona (1962 and 1978);
- "Óscar Esplà" in Music Composition Award (1982);
- Premi Nacional de Música de Catalunya (2001);
- Premio Nacional de Música (2009);
- XI Iberoamerican Prize Premio Tomás Luis de Victoria. (2011)
- Medal of Merit in the Fine Arts. (2013), refused.
