= Agustín Bertomeu =

Spanish basketball player (born 1939)

Personal information
- Full name: Agustín Bertomeu López
- Nationality: Spanish
- Born: 18 April 1939 (age 87) Barcelona, Spain

Sport
- Sport: Basketball

Agustín Bertomeu López (Note: In this Spanish name, the first or paternal surname is Bertomeu and the second or maternal family name is López.) (born 18 April 1939) is a Spanish basketball player. He competed in the men's tournament at the 1960 Summer Olympics.
