= Francisco Guerrero Marín =

Spanish composer

Francisco Guerrero Marín (July 7, 1951 – October 19, 1997) was a Spanish composer. He was born in Linares and died in Madrid.

During his lifetime, he completed several compositions, among which there are five major works for orchestra: Antar Atman (1980), Ariadna (1984), Sahara (1991), Oleada (1993) and Coma Berenices (1997). In 1981, he started working on the cycle Zayin on request by the Arditti Quartet. Another project was an orchestration of the piano cycle Iberia of the Spanish composer Isaac Albéniz. However, this work was still unfinished on his death.

The main aspect in Guerrero's work was the search for musical elements to match natural phenomena. In the scope of his musical work, he studied physical and mathematical principles, most notably the fractal geometry of Benoît Mandelbrot.

== Works ==
Entire list of works: http://www.centrodedocumentacionmusicaldeandalucia.es/export/sites/default/publicaciones/pdfs/catalogo-guerrero.pdf

- Facturas (1969) for ensemble
- Da tagte es (1970) for organ
- Lo menos importante (1971) for harpsichord and three tape recorders
- Xénias Pacatas (1971–1972) for 18 strings
- Diapsalmata (1972) for electronics
- Oda (1973) for 9 instruments
- Noa (1973) for two trumpets and two trombones
- Lz Vox Eterna (1973) for two bass voices, four percussionists, and two tape recorders
- Kineema (1973) for clarinet and piano
- Ecce Opus (1973) for large orchestra
- Agonica (1973) for wind quintet
- Xenias Pacatas II (1974) for 2 guitars
- Jondo (1974) for brass, percussion, voices and tape
- Datura fastuosa (1974) for string orchestra
- Anemos A (1975) for wind ensemble and percussion
- Actus (1975) for wind ensemble and strings
- Sobra la tumba de... (1975–1976) for violin, viola, 2 trombones and 14 strings
- Op.1 Manual (1976) for piano
- Concierto de camara (1978) for six instruments
- Anemos C (1978) for 12 instruments
- Anemos B (1977–1978) for twelve mixed voices a cappella
- Acte préalable (1977–1978) for 4 percussionists
- Ars Combinatoria (1980) for 6 instruments
- Antar Atman (1980) for orchestra
- Erótica (1978–1981) for Contraalto and Guitar
- Vâda (1982) for 2 sopranos and 9 instruments
- Pâni (1981–1982) for harpsichord
- Zayin (1983) for string trio
- Ariadna (1984) for 10 violins, 5 violas and 5 violoncellos
- Têyas (1985) for 24 voices choir a cappella
- Rhea (1988) for 12 saxophones
- Zayin III (1989) for string trio
- Zayin II (1989) for string trio
- Nur (1990) for voices a capella
- Cefeidas (1990) for electronics
- Sahara (1991) for orchestra
- Dunas (1991) for string orchestra
- Delta Cephei (1991) for 2 clarinets, violin, viola and violoncello
- Rigel (1993) for electronics
- Oleada (1993) for string orchestra
- Zayin V (1994) for string trio
- Zayin IV (1994) for string quartet
- Hyades (1994) for voice, flute, trombone, bass and electronics
- Zayin VIIb (1995) for string trio
- Zayin VI (1995) for solo violin
- Coma Berenices (1996) for orchestra
- Zayin VII (1996–1997) for string quartet

== Recordings ==
- Francisco Guerrero, Complete Orchestral Works. José Ramón Encinar, Orquesta Sinfonica de Galicia. col legno, WWE1CD20044
- Francisco Guerrero, Zayin (I-VII, VIIb). Arditti Quartet. Almaviva, DS-0127
- Francisco Guerrero, Chamber Music. Joan Cerveró, Grup Instrumental de València. C33001
