= Tomás Marco =

Spanish composer (born 1942)

Tomás Marco Aragón (born 12 September 1942) is a Spanish composer and writer on music.

== Life and work ==
Marco was born in Madrid where he later studied violin and composition, while at the same time pursuing the study of law (he received his licenciate in law in 1963). He turned to composition in 1958, and in 1962 began attending the Darmstädter Internationale Ferienkurse, where he furthered his studies with Bruno Maderna, Pierre Boulez, Karlheinz Stockhausen, György Ligeti, Gottfried Michael Koenig, and Theodor W. Adorno. In 1967 he participated in Stockhausen’s collective composition project Ensemble at Darmstadt.

His compositional style is rooted in the music of the Darmstadt School. For example, Transfiguración (1974) strongly recalls Ligeti’s Lux aeterna (1966)—both are composed for 16 solo voices—as well as the harmonic overtone-singing of Stockhausen’s Stimmung (1968). In 1965 he began a brief association with the neo-Dada composers’ group Zaj, founded the previous year by Walter Marchetti, Juan Hidalgo, and Ramón Barce. He helped to found the Studio Nueva Generación in 1967, by which time some of his compositions were beginning to include references to historical styles and quotations from earlier composers—for example, Angelus novus (1971) refers to Gustav Mahler, the Cello Concerto (1976) is based on themes by Manuel de Falla as well as the Cant dels ocells by Pablo Casals, and his Fourth and Fifth Symphonies (1987 and 1989, respectively) both use a quotation from Richard Strauss's Also sprach Zarathustra —and for this reason his name is sometimes connected with the German New Simplicity composers. Around 1970 he began to employ traditional forms such as the symphony, sonata, and, especially, the concerto. His return to nationalism involves amongst other things a number of important works for the guitar, including three concertos.

In addition to the effect of his prodigious compositional output, he has had a strong influence on Spanish musical life through his work as a critic, broadcaster, writer, editor, educator, and administrator. After five years working as a music critic for various newspapers and magazines, in 1967 he founded, together with Ramón Barce, the magazine Sonda, dedicated to the subject of contemporary music. For eleven years he worked in the music division of the Radio Nacional de España, and for three years was professor of music history at the Universidad Nacional de Educación a Distancia (UNED) and professor of composition at the Conservatorio Real in Madrid. He has served as technical director of the Spanish National Orchestra (1981–85) and the Center for the Promotion of Contemporary Music (1985–95), and founded the Alicante International Contemporary Music Festival which he directed for eleven seasons. In 1996 he became Director General of the Instituto Nacional de las Artes Escenicas y la Música (National Institute for Music and the Performing Arts), a post he held until 1999.

== Honours ==
Marco has twice been awarded the Spanish Premio Nacional de Música, in 1969 and again in 2002. He won the Prix d’Honneur of the VI Bienalle de Paris in 1969 and, in that year as well as in 1971, received prizes from the Gaudeamus Foundation in the Netherlands. His composition Autodafé was awarded the Golden Harp Prize in 1975, and the UNESCO Young Composers’ Prize at the International Rostrum of Composers in 1976. For his activities as a broadcaster he was awarded the Premio Nacional de Radiodifusión in 1975. In 1993 he was elected to membership in the Real Academia de Bellas Artes de San Fernando, and in 1998 was awarded a Doctor Honoris Causa by the Universidad Complutense de Madrid.

== Compositions ==
=== Theatre ===
- Anna Blume (text: Kurt Schwitters), for two reciters, instrumental ensemble, and tape (1967)
- El caballero de la triste figura, chamber opera after Don Quijote by Cervantes (2004)
- Cantos del pozo artesiano (text: Eugenio de Vicente), for actress and ten instruments (1967)
- Jabberwocky (text: Lewis Carroll), for actress and instrumental ensemble (1966)
- Llanto por Ignacio Sánchez Mejías, ballet, with orchestra (1985)
- Ojos verdes de luna (text: Gustavo Adolfo Bécquer and a poem from the Orlando Furioso by Ludovico Ariosto), monodrama, for soprano, strings, and two percussionists (1994)
- Selene (text: Tomás Marco) (1965–73)
- El viaje circular, opera in one act after the Odyssey by Homer (2002)

=== Film music ===
- Módulo '74', music for the film by José Esteban Lasala (1974)
- Temporalidad interna, music for the film by Javier Aguirre (1970)

=== Choral and vocal ===
- América, cantata (2000)
- Apocalypsis, cantata for reciter, choir, and instrumental ensemble (1976)
- Ceremonia barrocca, for choir and chamber ensemble (1991)
- Concierto coral no. 1, for double choir and violin (1980)
- Ecos de Antonio Machado, for choir and organ (1975)
- Espacio sagrado (Concierto coral no. 2) , for piano, double choir, and orchestra (1983)
- Luar, for soprano and guitar (1991)
- Misa básica, for choir (1978)
- La Pasión segun San Marcos, narrator, 3 choirs, brass, and percussion (1983)
- Retrato del poeta (text: Gerardo Diego), for voice and piano (1973)
- (S) Otto Voci (e)
- Tea Party, for four singers (S, MzS, T, B), clarinet, trombone, vibraphone, and cello (1970)
- Transfiguración, for 16 solo voices (1974)
- Ultramarina (Epitafio para Lope de Aguirre), for voice and instrumental ensemble (1975)

=== Orchestral ===
- Anábasis, for orchestra (1970)
- Angelus novus (Mahleriana), for orchestra (1971)
- Arbol de arcángeles (serenata virtual), for string orchestra (1995)
- Bis, encore, zugabe, propina, for orchestra (1993)
- Campo de estrellas, for orchestra
- Concerto for Cello and Orchestra (1976)
- Concerto for Violin and Orchestra (1971)
- Concierto austral, for oboe and orchestra (1981)
- Concierto del agua, for guitar and orchestra (1993)
- Concierto del alma, for violin and string orchestra (1982)
- Concierto Eco, for amplified guitar and orchestra (1976–78)
- Concierto Guadiana, for guitar and strings (1973)
- Del tiempo y la memoria, concerto for soprano, consort (harp, accordion, alto saxophone, timpani, and a percussionist), 3 distant violins, and orchestra (2006)
- Escorial, for orchestra (1974)
- Laberinto Marino, for cello and orchestra (2001)
- Les mécanismes de la mémoire, for violin and orchestra (1973)
- Mysteria, for an orchestra of 38 musicians (1970)
- Oculto carmen, for orchestra (1995)
- La Périphérie du paradis, for six groups of at least six performers each (1988)
- Pulsar, for orchestra (1986)
- Quasi una requiem, for string quartet and string orchestra
- Sinfonietta No. 1 ("Opaco resplandor de la memoria"), for orchestra (1998–99)
- Sinfonietta No. 2 ("Curvas del Guadiana") (2004)
- Symphony No. 1 "Aralar" (1976)
- Symphony No. 2 "Espacio cerrado" [Closed Space] (1985)
- Symphony No. 3, for small orchestra (1985)
- Symphony No. 4 "Espacio quebrado" [Broken Space] (1987)
- Symphony No. 5 "Modelos de universo" [Universe Models] (1989)
- Symphony No. 6 "Imago mundi" [Image of the World] (1992)
- Sinfonía No. 7 "Comoedia Millenni" (2004)
- Symphony No. 8 "Gaia's Dance" (2008)
- Symphony No. 9 "Thalassa" (2009)
- Triple Concerto, for violin, cello, piano, and orchestra (1987)
- Vitral (música celestial I), for organ and string orchestra (1968–69)

=== Chamber music ===
- Albor, for flute, clarinet, violin, cello, and piano (1970)
- Algaida, for ondes Martenot, piano, and percussion (1978)
- Anaconda, for two marimbas (1991)
- Arcadia, for variable ensemble of woodwinds, strings, and keyboards (1975)
- Arias de aire, for flute and piano (1986)
- Autodafé (Concierto barrocco no.1), for piano, organ, three instrumental groups, and violins in echo (1975)
- Bastilles, for a stringed instrument and harpsichord (1988)
- Car en effet, for 3 clarinets and 3 saxophones (1965)
- Diwanes y quasidas, for chamber ensemble (1987)
- Dúo concertante no. 1, for two guitars (1974)
- Dúo concertante no. 2, for violin and guitar (1976)
- Dúo concertante no. 3, for violin and piano (1978)
- Dúo concertante no. 4, for viola and piano (1980)
- Ensemble (flute part, in a collaborative composition, supervised by Karlheinz Stockhausen), for 12 instruments, tapes, and live electronics (1967)
- Espejo de viento, for 12 saxophones (1988)
- Espejo velado, for double wind quintet (1982)
- Hoquetus, for 1, 2, or 3 clarinets, live and/or recorded (1977)
- Jetztzeit, for clarinet and piano (1971)
- Kukulcán, for flute, oboe, clarinet, bassoon, and horn (1969/72)
- Kwaidan, for saxophone and piano (1988)
- Locus solus, for chamber ensemble (1978)
- Luciérnaga furiosa (Duo concertante no. 5), for flute and guitar (1991)
- Maya, for cello and piano (1968–69)
- Miriada, for guitar and percussion (1969–70)
- Miró, for eight cellos (1993)
- Necronomicon, for six percussionists (1971)
- Nuba, for flute, oboe, clarinet, violin, cello, and percussion (1973)
- La nuit de Bordeaux: aguafuerte Goyesca, for guitar and string quartet (1998)
- Paraíso dinámico, for 4 saxophones, piano, and two percussionists
- Paraíso mecánico, for saxophone quartet (1988)
- Paso a dos, for two pianos (1968)
- Quinteto filarmónico, for flute, harp, violin, viola, and cello (1984)
- Quinto cantar, for violin, cello, and piano (1988)
- Recóndita armonía (Chamber Symphony No. 1), for 15 instruments (1990)
- Roulis-Tangage, for trumpet, piano, vibraphone, percussion, guitar, electric guitar, and cello (1962–63)
- Rosa-Rosae, for flute, clarinet, violin, and cello (with crotales and triangles), with or without lighting effects (1969)
- Schwan (ein Liebeslied), for trumpet, trombone, 2 percussionists, viola, and cello (1966)
- String Quartet No. 1 ("Aura") (1968)
- String Quartet No. 2 ("Espejo desierto") (1987)
- String Quartet No. 3 ("Anatomía fractal de los ángeles") (1993)
- String Quartet No. 4 ("Los desastres de la guerra") (1996)
- String Quartet No. 5 ("Memorial del olvido") (2007)
- String Quartet No. 6 ("Gaia's Song") (2011)
- String Quartet No. 7 ("Primus Circumdediste me") (2018)
- Tartessos, for four percussionists (1979)
- Tauromaquia (Concierto barrocco no. 2), for piano 4 hands and 13 instruments (1974–76)
- Teatro de la Memoria, for six saxophones (2002)
- Tormer, for harpsichord, violin, viola, and cello (1977)
- Trio concertante no. 1: en homenaje a Mompou, for violin, cello, and piano (1983)
- Trio concertante no. 2, for flute, violin, and viola (1984)
- Trivium, for tuba, piano, and percussion (vibraphone and marimba) (1962)

=== Solo instrumental ===
==== Guitar ====
- Albayalde, for guitar (1965)
- Fantasia Sobre Fantasia, for guitar (1989)
- Naturaleza muerta con guitarra (Homenaje a Picasso), for guitar (1975)
- Paisaje grana (Homenaje a Juan Ramón Jiménez) , for guitar (1975)
- Presto mormorando, for guitar (1996)
- Sempere, for guitar (1985)
- Sonata de fuego, for guitar (1990)
- Tarots, 22 pieces for guitar (1991)

==== Percussion ====
- Algunas maneras de nombrar la lluvia, for five-octave marimba (with “algunos instrumentos de boca”) (2004)
- Floreal: música celestial II, for solo percussion (1969)

==== Keyboard & accordion ====
- Aria de la batalla, for organ (1979)
- Astrolabio, for organ (1969–70)
- Bachground, for piano
- Campana rajada, for piano (1980)
- Cuatro cartas, for piano (1987)
- Evos, for piano (1970)
- Fétiches, for piano (1967–68)
- Herbania, for harpsichord (1977)
- Le Palais du facteur cheval, for piano (1984)
- Pirana, for piano (1965)
- Sonata acueducto, for accordion (1999)
- Sonata atlantica, for piano
- Sonata de Vesperia, for piano (1977)
- Soleá, for piano (1982)
- Temporalia, for piano (1974)

==== Strings ====
- Partita del obradoiro, for violin
- Reloj interior, for contrabass, with or without simultaneous electronic transformation (1971)
- Sicigia, for cello (1977)

==== Winds ====
- Akelarre, for a woodwind instrument and tape (1976)
- Octavário, for solo flute (or with percussion) (1967)
- Tromba di pace, three pieces for solo trumpet (1999)
- Zobel, for solo flute (1984)

== Writings (selective list) ==
- 1970. Música española de vanguardia. Punto omega, coleccion Universitaria de bolsillo. Madrid: Ediciones Guadarrama.
- 1970. La música de la España contemporánea. Temas españoles 508. Madrid: Publicaciones Españolas.
- 1971. Luis de Pablo. Artistas españoles contemporáneos 6. Madrid: Dirección General de Bellas Artes, Ministerio de Educación y Ciencia.
- 1972. Cristóbal Halffter. Artistas españoles contemporáneos 34. Madrid: Servicio de Publicaciones del Ministerio de Educación y Ciencia.
- 1976. Carmelo A. Bernaola. Madrid: Servicio de Publicaciones del Ministerio de Educación y Ciencia. ISBN 84-369-0048-0
- 1983. Historia de la música española 6: Siglo XX. Edited by Pablo López de Osaba. Madrid: Alianza. ISBN 84-206-8988-2 (7-volume set). English edition as Spanish Music in the 20th Century translated by Cola Franzen, Cambridge: Harvard University Press, 1993. ISBN 0-674-83102-0
- 1987. "Los Módulos." In Escritos sobre Luis de Pablo, edited by José Luis García del Busto, 159–78. Madrid: Taurus.
- 1988. "La sinfonía hoy" Temporadas de la música 6, no. 19:69–73.
- 1991. Xavier Benguerel (co-authored with Carles Guinovart). Barcelona: Generalitat de Catalunya, Departament de Cultura.
- "Treinta años después." Revista de Occidente, no. 151:115–18.
- 1993. La creación musical como imágen del mundo entre el pensamiento lógico y el pensamiento mágico: Discurso académico del electo Excmo. Sr. D. Tomás Marco Aragón, leído en el acto de su recepción pública el día 7 de noviembre de 1993. Madrid: Real Academia de Bellas Artes de San Fernando.
- 1993. Manuel Castillo: "Cinco sonetos lorquianos". Granada: Centro de Documentación Musical de Andalucía.
- 1995. "Mis relaciones compositivas con la guitarra." In La guitarra en la historia 6, edited by Eusebio Rioja Vázquez, 11–22. Córdoba: Posada.
- 1996. "Granada, una ciudad musical." In VII Jornadas de Música Contemporánea, 1–28. Granada: Fundación Caja de Granada.
- 1996. "Sobre mis sinfonías." Cuadernos de música iberoamericana 1:283–95.
- 1999. "La máquina como extensión musical". Actas del coloquio internacional antropología y música: Diálogos. II—Hombres, música y máquinas. Música oral del sur: Revista internacional 4:85–95.
- 2002. Pensamiento musical y siglo XX. Madrid: Fundación Autor-SGAE. ISBN 84-8048-469-1
- 2003. Historia de la música occidental del siglo XX. Madrid: Alpuerto. ISBN 84-381-0382-0
- 2005. "Lo folclórico en el sinfonismo: Nacionalismo turístico y de postal." Pensar el flamenco desde las ciencias sociales. Música oral del sur: Revista internacional no. 6:337–47.
