= Gonzalo de Olavide =

Spanish composer

Gonzalo de Olavide y Casenave (28 March 1934 – 4 November 2005) was a Spanish composer born in Madrid.

Olavide studied composition initially with Victorino Echevarría at the Conservatorio Superior de Madrid, then in Belgium at the conservatories of Antwerp and Brussels. He attended the Darmstadt Internationale Ferienkurse für Neue Musik where he worked with Pierre Boulez and Luciano Berio, and later studied with Karlheinz Stockhausen and Henri Pousseur at the Second, Third, and Fourth Cologne Courses for New Music in 1964–65, 1965–66, and 1966–67. For twenty years he lived and worked in Geneva, returning to Spain in 1991.

Olavide composed orchestral, chamber, solo, and electronic music. In 1986 he received the Premio Nacional de Música, and in 2001 the Premio Reina Sofia.

== Compositions ==
- Triludio (1963)
- Índices, for chamber orchestra (1964)
- Henri à quatre, composed jointly with Holger Schüring [Czukay], Attilio Filieri, and Ivan Tcherepnin (1965)
- Quartet (1971)
- Sine die, for orchestra (1972)
- Quasi una cadenza, for chamber ensemble (1973)
- Clamor I, electronic music (1974)
- Clamor II, for tape and large orchestra (1974)
- Clamor III, for voice, two pianos, and percussion (1974)
- Symphony "Homenaje a Falla" (1977)
- El Cántico (1978)
- Oda, on a text by Antonio Machado (1980)
- Cante in memoriam García Lorca, for orchestra (1980)
- Quinto Hymno de Desesperanza (1983)
- La extravagancia, for chamber ensemble (1985)
- Perpetuum mobile, for piano (1986)
- Tres fragmentos imaginarios, for piano (1987)
- Orbe-Variations, for orchestra (1988)
- Alternante, for chamber orchestra (1989)
- Silente-Aria (1991)
- Minimal, for piano (1993)
- Precipiten (Música impresa), for cello and piano (1993)
- Varianza, for flute, oboe, clarinet, piano, violin, and cello (1995)
- Vol(e), for accordion (1997)
- Tránsito, for string orchestra (1997)
- El piso cerrado, radiophonic work (2001)
- Fragmentario, for amplified cello and electronic music (2004)

== Sources ==
- Guibert, Alvaro. 1996. Gonzálo de Olavide. Catálogos de compositores españoles. Madrid: Sociedad General de Autores y Editores (SGAE). ISBN 84-8048-145-5
- Tamayo Ballesteros, Arturo. 1991. "La música en España, hoy. XVI: La música española en el extranjero." Boletín informativo: Fundación Juan March, no. 211 (June–July): 3–8.
- Téllez, José Luis. 2005. "Un espíritu libre." Scherzo: Revista de música no. 203 (December): 5.
