= Luis de Pablo =

Spanish composer (1930–2021)

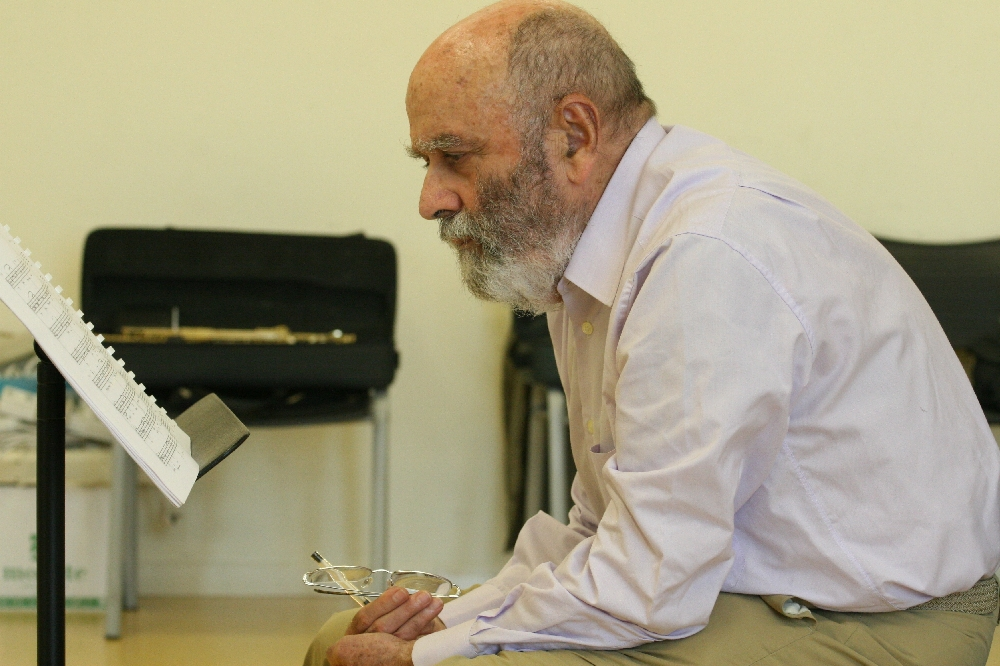
- De Pablo in 2008
- Born: 28 January 1930; Bilbao, Spain
- Died: 10 October 2021 (aged 91); Madrid, Spain
- Other names: Luis de Pablo Costales
- Occupations: Composer; Cultural manager; Publisher; Academic teacher
- Organizations: Grupo Nueva Musica; Tiempo y Musica; Alea; Madrid Conservatory; University at Buffalo; University of Ottawa; University of Montreal
- Awards: Premio Nacional de Música

Luis de Pablo Costales (28 January 1930 – 10 October 2021) was a Spanish composer belonging to the generation that Cristóbal Halffter named the Generación del 51. Mostly self-taught as a composer and influenced by Maurice Ohana and Max Deutsch, he co-founded ensembles for contemporary music, and organised concert series for it in Madrid. He published translations of notable texts about composers of the Second Viennese School, such as Hans Heinz Stuckenschmidt's biography of Arnold Schoenberg and the publications of Anton Webern. He wrote music in many genres, including film scores such as Erice's The Spirit of the Beehive, and operas including La señorita Cristina. He taught composition not only in Spain, but also in the U.S. and Canada. Among his awards is the Premio Nacional de Música.

== Life ==
Luis de Pablo was born in Bilbao. After losing his father in the Spanish Civil War, he went with his mother and siblings to live in Madrid from age six. Although he started to compose at the age of 12, his circumstances made it impossible to consider an artistic career, and so he studied law at the Complutense University of Madrid. For a short time after graduating in 1952, he was employed as legal advisor to Iberia Airlines, but soon resigned this post in order to pursue a career in music. As a composer, he was essentially an autodidact. He travelled to the Darmstädter Ferienkurse in the 1960s, where he met Pierre Boulez, György Ligeti, Bruno Maderna and Karlheinz Stockhausen. In Paris, he studied with Max Deutsch and Maurice Ohana. His participation at the Darmstädter Ferienkurse in 1959 led to the performance of some of his works under Boulez and Maderna.

De Pablo and Cristóbal Halffter are regarded as key members of a group called Generación del 51, formed by young composers at the time they finished their studies, with a mission to connect music in Spain to musical developments in Europe after the Civil War. De Pablo adapted atonalism, serialism, aleatory forms, use of electronics and graphic notation. In 1958, he co-founded the group Grupo Nueva Musica, and in 1959, Tiempo y Musica. He organised several contemporary music concert series, for example the Forum Musical and Bienal de Música Contemporánea de Madrid. He was particularly concerned with promoting appreciation in Spain of the Second Viennese School, publishing translations of Hans Heinz Stuckenschmidt's biography of Arnold Schoenberg in 1961, and texts by Anton Webern in 1963. In 1965, he founded the first studio for electronic music in Spain, with the group Alea. He founded a festival, Rencontres de Pampelune, for music, theatre, film and the arts in 1972. He was accused of giving too much prominence to "left-wing art" by the Franco regime, but also of being a supporter of that regime by ETA. When one of the festival's patrons was kidnapped by ETA, the event was cancelled, and De Pablo went into exile in the U.S. and Canada, returning only after Franco's death.

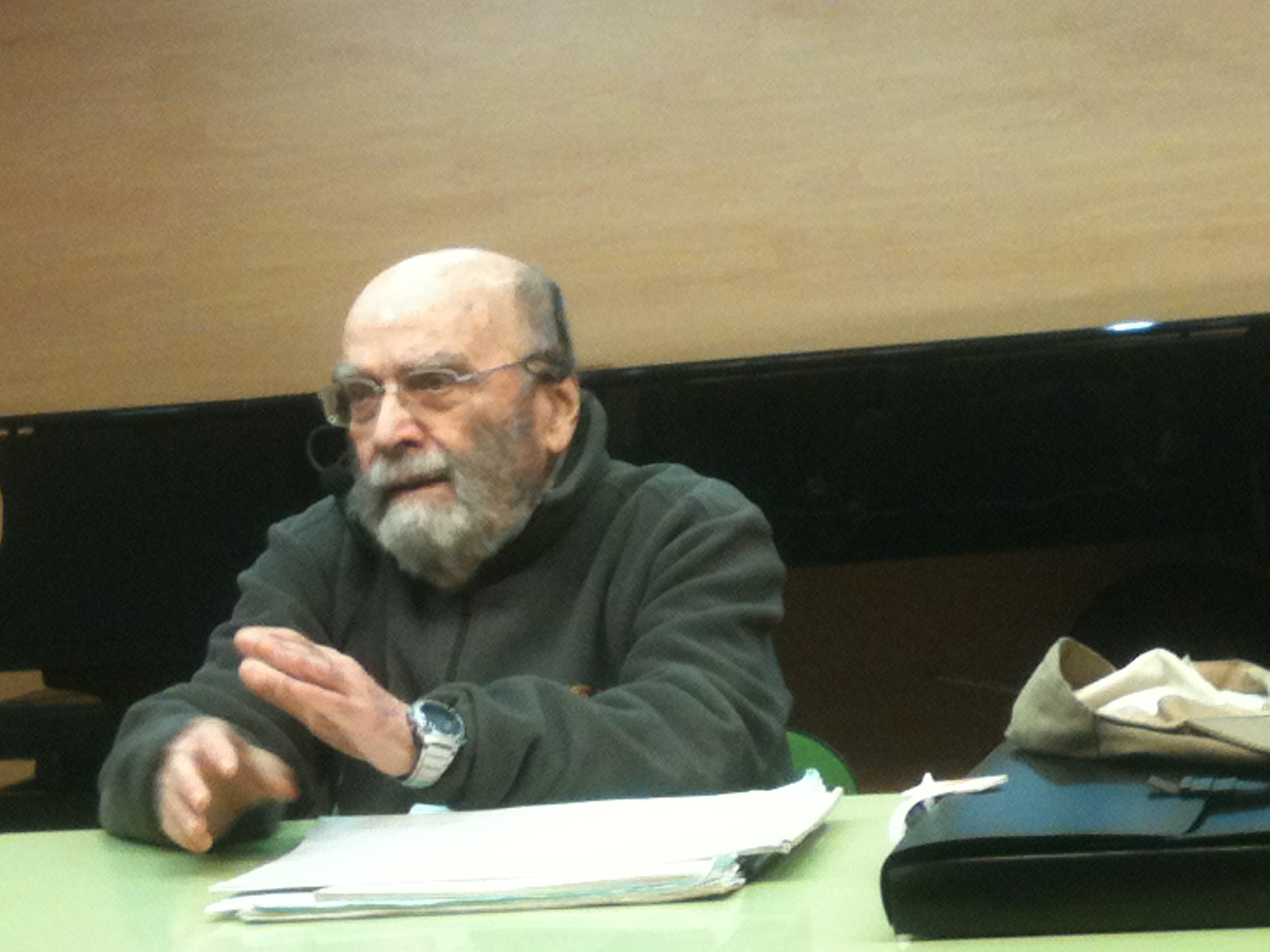
Luis de Pablo in Madrid in 2014

De Pablo composed film scores, collaborating with directors such as Víctor Erice (The Spirit of the Beehive) and Carlos Saura (The Hunt). His opera Kiu is based on Alfonso Vallejo's farce Zero Temperature. The world premiere of his opera La señorita Cristina (Miss Cristina), based on a novel by Mircea Eliade, with a stage design by José Hernández, took place in 2001 at the Teatro Real in Madrid.

De Pablo began teaching at the Madrid Conservatory in 1971. In exile, he lectured at the University at Buffalo, and later at the University of Ottawa and the University of Montreal. He resumed teaching in Spain upon his return. De Pablo was awarded Spain's Premio Nacional de Música for composition in 1991, among many other awards.

De Pablo died in Madrid on 10 October 2021, aged 91.

== Compositions ==
Luis de Pablo Costales has more than 143 works among which are:

- 1953 – Gárgolas
- 1954 – Coral eucarístico
- 1954 – Sinfonías
- 1954–66 – Sinfonías
- 1955 – Invenciones
- 1956 – Concierto para clavicémbalo
- 1956 – Misa Pax humilium,
- 1956 – Elegía
- 1956 – Tres Piezas para guitarra
- 1956 – Comentarios a dos
- 1957 – Móvil I
- 1957 – Cinco Invenciones
- 1958 – Sonata para piano
- 1958 – Cuarteto nº 1
- 1959 – Progressus
- 1959–67 – Móvil II
- 1960 – Radial
- 1961 – Glosa
- 1961–62 – Polar
- 1961–62 – Libro para el pianista
- 1962 – Condicionado
- 1962 – Prosodia
- 1962–63 – Tombeau
- 1963 – Recíproco
- 1963 – Cesuras
- 1964 – Escena
- 1964–65 – Módulos I
- 1965 – Ein Wort
- 1965 – Mitología I
- 1965–67 – Módulos IV
- 1965–66 – Iniciativas
- 1966 – Módulos II
- 1967 – Imaginario I
- 1967 – Módulos III
- 1967 – Imaginario II
- 1967 – Módulos V
- 1968 – Protocolo
- 1968 – Paráfrasis
- 1969 – Cuatro Invenciones
- 1969 – Quasi une fantasia
- 1969 – Por diversos motivos

Chamber music

- Anatomías for viola solo, two clarinets, horn, trombone and harp (2005–2007)
- Ex voto for violin and viola (1995)
- Monólogo for viola solo (1990–1992)

' Choral music

- Yo Lo Vi for 12 voices (1970)
- Passio (2006)

Orchestral music

- Las Orillas (1990)

Operas

- Kiu (1983)
- El viajero indiscreto (1990)
- La señorita Cristina (2000)

Film music

- La Caza (The Hunt), Carlos Saura (1966)
- El jardín de las delicias (The Garden of Delights), Carlos Saura (1970)
- El Espíritu de la Colmena (The Spirit of the Beehive), Victor Erice (1973)

== Recordings ==
Recordings by de Pablo include:

- Los Novísimos, Vendaval (Stradivarius, 2010)
- Libro de imágenes, Segunda Lectura, Metáforas (Stradivarius, 2014)
- Soliloquio, Melisma furioso, Per Flauto, Cuatro Fragmentos De 'Kiu' (Stradivarius, 2015)
- Senderos del aire and works for flute. Col Legno
- Dibujos, fragments from Kiu, Chamber Concerto et al. ADDA
- Tarde de Poetas. Harmonia Mundi
- Piano Trio. Ermitage ERM 413
- Visto de Cerca, para 3 músicos y cinta; Chaman, obra electronica. Hispavox LP (30) 130 202
- Al Son que Tocan, Homenaje an Antonio Machado. RCA LP SRL2-2444

== Writings ==
- Aproximación a una estética de la música contemporánea, in: Los complementarios, Editorial Ciencia Nueva, 1968
- Lo que sabemos de música, Gregorio del Toro, 1968

== Awards ==
De Pablo received awards including:

- Gold Medal for Merit in Fine Arts (1986)
- Ordre des Arts et des Lettres (1986)
- Premio Nacional de Música (1991)
- Madrid Region Culture Award (2001)
- Guerrero Foundation Music Prize (2004)
- Gold Medal of Círculo de Bellas Artes (2005)
- Tomás Luis de Vitoria Award (2009)
- Golden Lion at the Venice Biennale (2020)
- Prix Honegger de la Fondation de France
- Prix de Composition Musicale de la Fondation Prince Pierre de Monaco for Frondoso Misterio, cello and orchestra (2004)
- Prix de la Fondation Jacinto Guerrero
