= Joan Guinjoan =

Catalan composer and pianist (1931–2019)

Joan Guinjoan Gispert
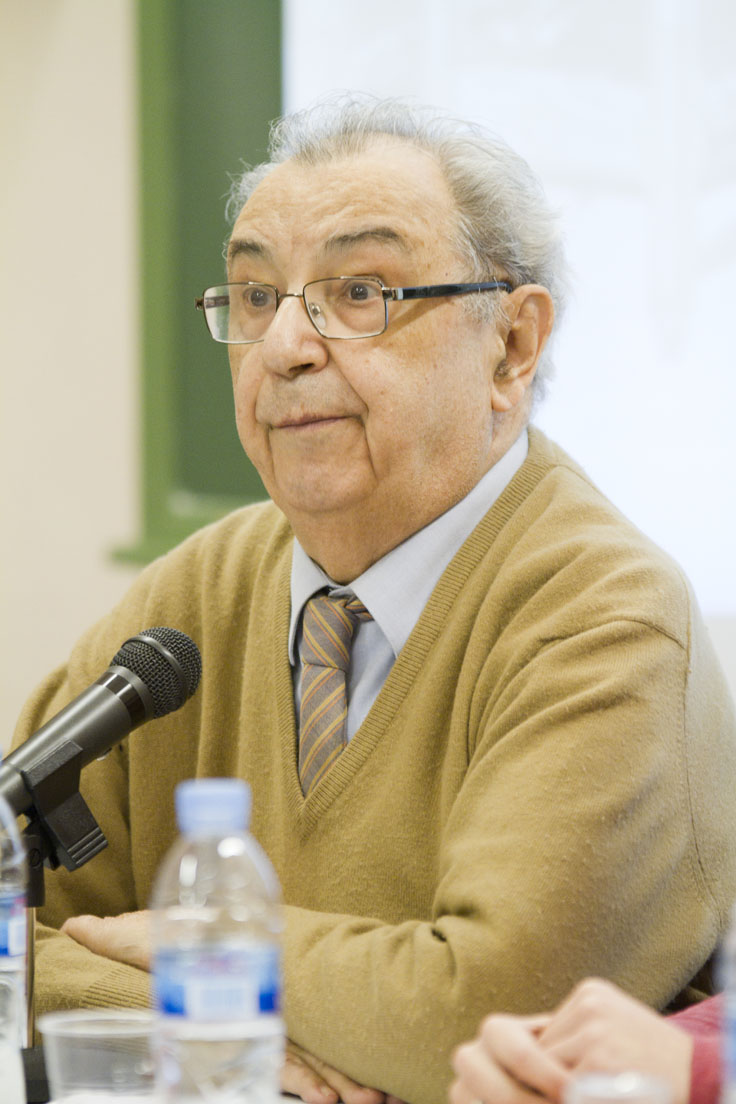

Background information
- Born: Joan Guinjoan Gispert; November 28, 1931; Riudoms, Catalonia
- Died: January 1, 2019 (aged 87)
- Genres: Contemporary classical music
- Occupations: Composer, Pianist
- Instrument: Piano
- Website: joanguinjoan.com

Joan Guinjoan i Gispert (28 November 1931 – 1 January 2019) was a Catalan composer and pianist.

== Life ==
Born in Riudoms, Guinjoan studied at the Conservatori Superior de Música del Liceu in Barcelona. In 1954, he moved to Paris and continued his studies at the École normale de musique. He also received instruction from Cristòfor Taltabull. After more than 250 piano recitals, he abandoned his career as a pianist in the 1960s. He then devoted himself to composition. In 1962, he joined the Schola Cantorum de Paris. He returned to Barcelona the following year.

In 1999 he received the Creu de Sant Jordi, a distinction awarded by the Generalitat de Catalunya, then in 2001, he received the Gold Medal of Merit in the Fine Arts awarded by the Spanish Ministry of Education, Culture and Sports.

The personal papers of Joan Guinjoan are preserved in the Biblioteca de Catalunya.

== Works ==
- Suite moderna (1960)
- Sinfonía de la imperial Tarraco (1961)
- Prélude nº 1 (1961)
- Prélude nº 2 (1961)
- Momentos 1 (1961)
- Fantasie en do (1961)
- Escenas de niños (1961)
- El pinell de Dal (1962)
- Chez García Ramos (1962)
- Tentación (1963)
- Scherzo et trío (1963)
- Rayo de luna (1963)
- Prelude nº 3 (1963)
- Peces bermejos (1963)
- Nubes (1963)
- Concierto for piano and chamber orchestra (1963)
- Jour jusqu'au sang (1964)
- Fantasy for clarinet and piano (1964)
- Canto espiritual indio (1964)
- Trois mouvementes pour piano, clarinette et percussion (1965)
- Triptique pour quintette à vent (1965)
- Tres pequeñas piezas (1965)
- Miniaturas (1965)
- Puntos cardinales (1966)
- Células nº 1 (1966)
- Células nº 2 (1966)
- Monólogo de Orestes (1968)
- Los cinco continentes (1968)
- Dynamiques-Rythmes (1968)
- Five studies for two pianos and percussion 1968)
- Células nº 3 (1968)
- Three pieces for clarinet alone (1969)
- Symphonic Suite of the Ballet Los cinco continentes (1969)
- Pentágono (1969)
- Musica intuitiva (1969)
- Fragmento (1969)
- Duet for cello and piano (1970)
- Bi-tematic (1970)
- Magma (1971)
- La rosa de los vientos (1971, revised in 1978)
- Tensión-Relax (1972)
- Retaule (1972)
- Diagramas (1972). Prize for composition of the city of Barcelona in 1972.
- Tríptico de Semana Santa (1973)
- Las moscas (1973)
- Improvisación I (1973)
- Ab origine (1974)
- Trama (1975, revised in 1983)
- Música para violonchelo y orquesta (1975, revised in 1980)
- Acta est fabula (1975)
- Variorum (1976)
- Retorno a Cataluña (1976)
- Por la esperanza (1976)
- Duelo (1976)
- Dígrafo (1976)
- Tzakol (1977)
- Magic (1977)
- Koan 77 (1977)
- El diario (1977)
- Ambiente nº 1 (1977)
- Phobos (1978)
- La rosa de los vientos. Second version in (1978). Prize for composition of the city of Barcelona in 1978.
- G.I.C. 1978 (1978)
- Divagante (1978)
- Cadenza (1978)
- Puzzle (1979)
- Prisma (1979)
- Phrase (1979)
- Jondo (1979)
- G.I.C. 1979 (1979)
- Neuma (1980)
- Micrótono for viola solo (1980)
- Horitzo (1980)
- Croquis (1980)
- Au revoir, Barocco (1980)
- Tensión (1981)
- Trio per archi (1982)
- Foc d'aucell (1982)
- Diferencias (1983)
- Concerto n° 1 for piano and orchestra (1983). In memoriam Ernest Lluch.
- Vectorial (1985)
- Música para II (1985)
- Contrapunto alla mente (1985)
- Homenaje a Carmen Amaya (1986)
- Concerto N° 1 for violin and orchestra (1986)
- Nocturno (1987)
- In tribulatione mea invocavi dominum (1987). Dedicated to Pietat Homs.
- Resonancias (1988)
- Passim-Trío (1988)
- Concerto for bassoon and instrumental ensemble (Concierto para fagot y conjunto instrumental) (1989)
- Concerto for guitar and orchestra (1990)
- Trencadis (1991)
- Gaudí (1989-1992). Opera dedicated to Monique Gispert de Guinjoan, wife of the composer
- Nexus (1993)
- Trencadís (1994). Symphonic fragment of the ballet, taken from his opera Gaudí
- Self-Paráfrasis (1997). Dedicated to Enrique Franco.
- Symphonie No 2 Ciutat de Tarragona (1998). Dedicated to Montserrat Icart.
- Pantonal (1998). In homage to the Cadaqués Orchestra, dedicated to Isabel Guinjoan Cambra, niece of the composer
- Bi-temàtic (1998)
- Fanfarria (1999). Dedicated to the Barcelona Symphony and Catalonia National Orchestra.
- Autógrafo (1999).
- Díptico para 8 violonchelos (2000). Dedicated to [Jacques Bernaerd.
