= Cristóbal Halffter =

Spanish classical composer (1930–2021)

Cristóbal Halffter Jiménez-Encina (24 March 1930 – 23 May 2021) was a Spanish classical composer. He was the nephew of two other composers, Rodolfo and Ernesto Halffter, and is regarded as the most important Spanish composer of the generation of composers designated the Generación del 51.

== Early years ==
Halffter was born in Madrid, but in 1936 the family moved to Velbert, Germany, to escape the Spanish Civil War. They returned to Madrid in 1939, and Halftter studied with Conrado del Campo at the Madrid Royal Conservatory, graduating in 1951. He continued his studies, outside of his university education, with Alexandre Tansman and André Jolivet in Paris.

== Career ==
In 1955, Halffter was appointed conductor of the Falla orchestra. He forged a successful career as composer and conductor, writing music which combined a traditional Spanish element with avant-garde techniques. His neoclassical Piano Concerto (1953) won the National Music Prize in 1954. In 1961 he became Professor of Composition at the Royal Conservatory of Madrid, where he became Director in 1964 but remained only until 1966. Among his notable pupils are Jean-Luc Darbellay, David Philip Hefti, and Javier Jacinto.

During the 1960s and 1970s, Halffter composed a number of works relating to human rights, including the cantata Yes, speak out, yes. This work premiered in December 1968 with the choir of Augsburg College and soprano Irene Jordan and bass-baritone Robert Hale as the soloists in a performance at General Assembly Hall at the Headquarters of the United Nations. It was filmed for live television broadcast. In 1984 he served on the jury of the Paloma O'Shea International Piano Competition. He was awarded Spain's highest award for composition, the Premio Nacional de Música, in 1989. Also he has received the 2009 BBVA Foundation Frontiers of Knowledge Award in Contemporary Music.

Halffter's works include the opera Don Quijote (2000). His second opera, Lazarus, was premiered in 2008 at the Kiel Opera House to celebrate its centenary. A third opera, Schachnovelle, with a libretto by Wolfgang Haendeler after the eponymous novel by Stefan Zweig, was scheduled to premiere at the same house in May 2013.

== Personal life and death ==
He was married to pianist María Manuela Caro until her death on 18 December 2017, with whom he had two sons and a daughter.

He died peacefully on 23 May 2021, at the age of 91, in Villafranca del Bierzo, province of León.

== Selected works ==
- Concerto for piano and orchestra (1953)
- String Quartet no. 1 (1955)
- Tres piezas, for string quartet (1956)
- Introducción, fuga y finale, for piano (1957)
- Codex I for guitar (1963)
- Líneas y puntos, for 20 wind instruments and electroacoustics (1966)
- Anillos, for orchestra (1966)
- Cantata Symposium (1966)
- Yes, speak out, yes, cantata (1966)
- Líneas y puntos, for 20 wind instruments and tape (1967)
- Noche pasiva del sentido, for soprano, two percussionists and 4 tape recorders (1970)
- String Quartet no. 2 "Mémoires" (1970)
- Llanto por las víctimas de la violencia, for chamber group and electroacoustics (1971)
- Platero y yo, for choir, soloists, and narrator, based on the poem by Juan Ramón Jiménez (1974)
- Cello Concerto no. 1 (1974)
- Elegía de la muerte de tres poetas españoles (1975)
- Variaciones sobre la resonancia de un grito, for 11 instruments, tape, and live electronics (1976–77)
- String Quartet no. 3 (1978)
- Officium defunctorum, for orchestra and chorus (1979)
- Violin Concerto no. 1 (1979)
- Fantasia sobre una sonoridad de G. F. Haendel, for string orchestra (1981)
- Ricercare, for organ (1981)
- Versus (1983)
- Paráfrasis, for orchestra (1984)
- Cello Concerto no. 2 ("No queda más que el silencio") (1985)
- Tiento del primer tono y batalla imperial, for large orchestra (1986)
- Piano Concerto (1987–88)
- Fandango, for cello octet (1989)
- Fractal, for saxophone quartet (1990)
- Violin Concerto no. 2 (1990–91)
- Preludio para Madrid '92, for chorus and orchestra (1991)
- Siete cantos de España (1992)
- Veni Creator Spiritus, for mixed choir, ensemble choir, 12 brass instruments, and percussion (1992)
- Daliniana, for orchestra (1994)
- Don Quijote, opera (2000)
- Attendite, for cello octet (2003)
- String Quartet no. 7 Espacio de silencio (2007)
- Concerto for viola and orchestra (2014)
- Alucinaciones (Hallucinations), Collage for viola, cello, and double bass (trio basso) with orchestra (2015)

== Sources ==
- Alonso, Gonzalo. 2001. "Halffter: (3) Cristóbal Halffter (Jiménez)". The New Grove Dictionary of Music and Musicians, second edition, edited by Stanley Sadie and John Tyrrell. London: Macmillan Publishers.
- Anon. 2009. "Contemporary Music 2009: Cristóbal Halffter". Fundación BBVA website (accessed 24 May 2015).
- Anon. (19 December 2017). "Fallece en León la pianista María Manuela Caro, esposa del compositor Cristóbal Halffter". El Bierzo Digital (in Spanish).
- Anon. (23 May 2021). "Muere a los 91 años el compositor y director de orquesta Cristóbal Halffter" (in Spanish). RTVE.
- Anon. n.d. "EvS Music Foundation "Schachnovelle" – Composition Commission issued to Cristóbal Halffter: Theater Kiel" (accessed 26 June 2012).
- Anon. n.d.b. "Darbellay, Jean-Luc" (accessed 23 November 2015).
- Anon. n.d.c. "David Philip Hefti *13.4.1975". Composer A–Z on Edition Peters Group website (archive from 11 March 2016, accessed 2 November 2016).
- Anon. (n.d.d). "Premiados, Jurados, Orquestas y Artistas Invitados" [Winners, members of the jury and artistic guests] (in Spanish). Paloma O'Shea International Piano Competition.
- Cummings, Robert. Cristóbal Halffter at AllMusic
- Jacinto, Javier. 2008. "Biography" (accessed 23 November 2015)
- Kennedy, Michael. 2006. "Halffter, Cristóbal". The Oxford Dictionary of Music, second edition. Oxford and New York: Oxford University Press. ISBN 0-19-861459-4.
- Perez Castillo, Belen. 2001. "Spain, §I: Art music: 6. 20th century". The New Grove Dictionary of Music and Musicians, second edition, edited by Stanley Sadie and John Tyrrell. London: Macmillan Publishers.
- Reininghaus, Frieder. 2008. "Generalprobe für die allgemeine Auferstehung: Zur Uraufführung von Cristóbal Halffters Lazarus in Kiel". Neue Zeitschrift für Musik 169, no. 4 (July–August): 70.
- Robés, José Antonio, Cristóbal Halffter, Andrés Amorós, and Miguel de Cervantes Saavedra. 2004. Así se hace una ópera: Don Quijote, Cristóbal Halffter. Barcelona: Lunwerg Editores. ISBN 84-7782-835-0.
