= Aleksandra Kurzak =

Polish operatic soprano (born 1977)

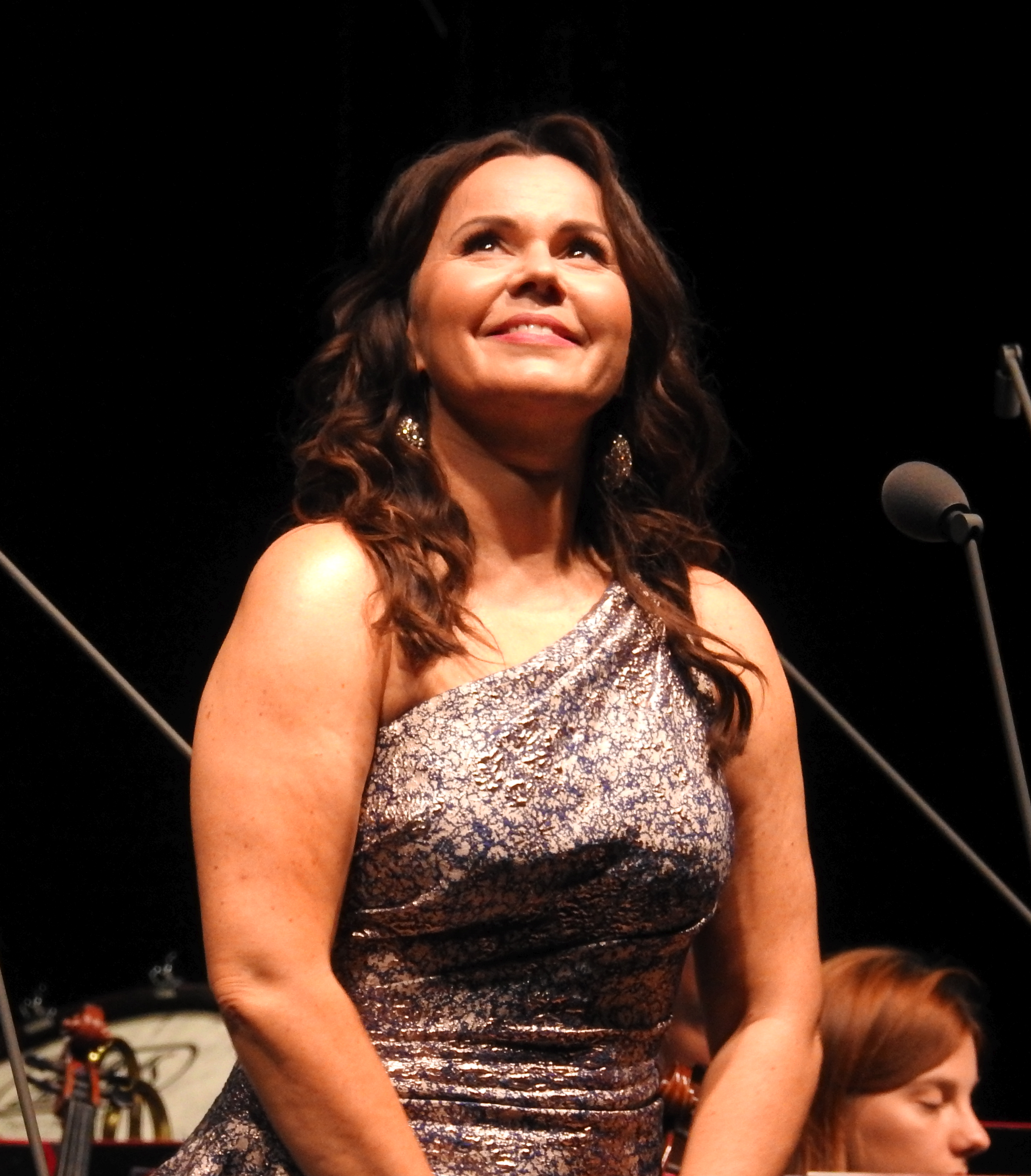
- Kurzak in 2025
- Born: 7 August 1977 (age 49); Brzeg Dolny, Polish People's Republic
- Occupation: Operatic soprano
- Years active: 2000–present
- Spouses: Jacek Jaskuła (m. 2000; div. 2007) Roberto Alagna (m. 2015)
- Children: 1
- Awards: Cross of Merit; Medal for Merit to Culture – Gloria Artis
- Website: aleksandrakurzak.com

Aleksandra Kurzak (Polish pronunciation: [alɛkˈsandra ˈkuʐak]; born 7 August 1977) is a Polish operatic soprano who has an international career primarily in Europe and the United States. In her earlier career she was a specialist in lyric and coloratura soprano roles in German and Italian repertoire, and transitioned into heavier roles in 19th-century Romantic and verismo operas.

Trained in Wrocław and Hamburg, she started her career in Hamburg State Opera's ensemble. She received international attention after her debuts at the Metropolitan Opera in New York and the Royal Opera, London in the 2004/05 season. Apart from the Met and Covent Garden, she has performed leading roles with many opera companies, including the Vienna State Opera, Bavarian State Opera, and Paris Opera. Her notable roles include Susanna in The Marriage of Figaro, Adina in L'elisir d'amore, Gilda in Rigoletto, Violetta in La traviata, and Nedda in Pagliacci. Since her marriage to Roberto Alagna in 2015, the couple has made frequent joint appearances on both concert and opera stages.

Kurzak had been exclusive with Decca Records artist from January 2011 until moving to Sony Classical Records in May 2018.

== Early life and education ==
Born in Brzeg Dolny and raised in Wrocław, Kurzak is daughter to operatic soprano Jolanta Żmurko and horn player Ryszard Kurzak. She had intended to be a ballet dancer, then a violinist; and began her musical studies playing the violin at the age of 7. Her singing talent was noticed by conductor Stefan Rachoń when she imitated her mother at a festival in Kudowa-Zdrój. The conductor immediately offered to record an album, which her parents refused. She went on studying in the violin at the Karol Szymanowski Musical Lyceum. She turned to singing after graduation and started voice lesson with her mother, whom she still considers her primary teacher. She was enrolled in the academy after auditioning with Konstanze's aria "Ach ich liebte" from Mozart's Die Entführung aus dem Serail.

From 1996 to 2000, Kurzak studied at the Karol Lipiński Academy of Music in Eugeniusz Sąsiadek's class; and meanwhile participated in several music festivals and was laureate in multiple competitions. (Note: Prizes are specified in the Awards and honours section.) She received scholarships from the Polish Ministry of Culture and Aleksander Gudzowaty's Crescendum Est - Polonia Foundation.

After graduation, Kurzak pursued postgraduate studies at the Hochschule für Musik und Theater Hamburg with Ingrid Kremling till 2004. She first met Kremling at the 1998 Stanisław Moniuszko Vocal Competition in Warsaw. She was discovered by Peter Katona, the casting director of the Royal Opera, despite not entering the final at the 2000 edition of Operalia.

She received a doctorate degree in music in 2009 and habilitated doctor's diploma in June 2016.

== Career ==
=== Early career (2000–2010) ===
Kurzak made her opera debut on 26 May 1999 in The Marriage of Figaro. Kurzak played the role Susanna alongside her mother as the countess at the Wrocław Opera, where she would go on to be a soloist for two seasons (2000–2002). She returned in 2009 for a new staging of The Marriage of Figaro. In 2001, she performed Hanna in Moniuszko's The Haunted Manor at the Polish National Opera in Warsaw. She also returned to the role in January 2007 when the production was again revived.

In the 2001/02 season she joined the Young Artists' Program of the Hamburg State Opera, she later became an ensemble member for the 2003/04 season. Her first role with the program was Kate Pinkerton in Madama Butterfly. She gained recognition after successful performances with Gilda (Rigoletto) and the Queen of the Night (The Magic Flute). By the second year she was assigned roles primarily in German and Italian repertoire, spanning from baroque to contemporary (Thomas Adès' Powder Her Face); and a performance in the 2002 production of Olga Neuwirth's Bählamms Fest. In 2004, she performed Marzelline in Fidelio. In 2005, she performed Cleopatra in Giulio Cesare and Servilia in La clemenza di Tito. She sang Fraarte in Handel's Radamisto in May 2007 before embarking her freelance career.

Kurzak received international attention when she debuted at the New York Metropolitan Opera with Olympia in The Tales of Hoffmann in December 2004, and at the Royal Opera, London with Aspasia in Mitridate, re di Ponto in July 2005. She has since been a frequent guest at the Royal Opera, returning in the 2005/06 season for Norina in Don Pasquale, and in consecutive seasons from 2007/08 till 2012/13. During this time Kurzak featured in L'elisir d'amore (Adina), The Marriage of Figaro (Susanna), Matilde di Shabran (Matilde), Il turco in Italia (Fiorilla), The Barber of Seville (Rosina). She made other guest appearances at the Bavarian State Opera, in Parma, Toulouse (Gilda in Rigoletto), Salzburg (Ännchen in Der Freischütz), and Palermo (Don Pasquale).

She returned to the Metropolitan Opera in 2007/08 for Die Entführung aus dem Serail (Blonde), in 2008/09 for Rigoletto, and in 2011/12 for Hansel and Gretel. In September 2008, she made her Vienna State Opera debut in The Barber of Seville. The year 2009 saw her appearance at the Lyric Opera of Chicago and Finnish National Opera, and portrayal of Aspasia at the Palacio de la Ópera in A Coruña and Welsh National Opera. Later in the year, she was featured in two productions at the Theater an der Wien: Don Giovanni (Donna Anna) and Tancredi (Amenaide). She would sing Donna Anna in two other productions, in Venice and Salzburg. In 2010, she made her La Scala debut in Rigoletto, and returned for The Marriage of Figaro in 2012.

=== Mid-career (2010–present) ===
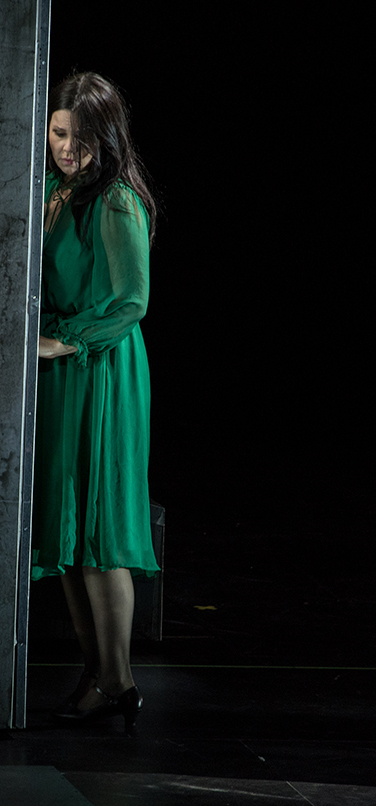
Kurzak in La Juive at the Bavarian State Opera, June 2016

Kurzak sang her first Violetta in La traviata in February 2010 for Mariusz Treliński's new production at the Polish National Opera. She returned to Warsaw for the same role, followed by Gilda in Rigoletto and Lucia in Lucia di Lammermoor. In October 2010, she sang her first Lucia at the Seattle Opera, for which she was named 2010/11 "Artist of the Year" by the company. Aside from her London appearances, she sang at the Verona Arena in three adjacent years since 2011, respectively as Rosina, Juliette (Roméo et Juliette), and Gilda. Kurzak was featured in four consecutive seasons in Vienna, where she sang Marie in La fille du régiment and Violetta. Further debuts took place in Turin, Valencia, Madrid, Barcelona, Los Angeles (Così fan tutte), San Francisco. In February 2013, she made her Zürich Opera House debut in Rigoletto. She went on maternity leave in September 2013, cancelling appearances including Rigoletto at the Met.

Kurzak returned to stage in a performance of L'elisir d'amore at the Bavarian State Opera in May 2014. She went on to portray the role in various productions of the opera, including Pelly's production at her Paris Opera debut in 2015 and Sher's production at the Metropolitan Opera in 2016. She continued to give performances of Gilda in London and Vienna, Marie in Madrid, and Norina in Zürich. She returned to La Scala for Countess Adèle in Le comte Ory, and the Metropolitan Opera again for Hansel and Gretel. In 2015, she performed in La traviata at the Deutsche Oper Berlin, and returned to Covent Garden for a revival of Il turco in Italia. Kurzak won the Best Female Singer in the Bachtrack Opera Awards for the latter performance. She then performed the title role in Maria Stuarda at the Théâtre des Champs-Élysées. In 2016, she shared the title role with Diana Damrau in Katie Mitchell's new Lucia di Lammermoor at the Royal Opera, London.

Kurzak made several role debuts in 2016: Rachel in La Juive (Bavarian State Opera), Nedda in Pagliacci (Zürich), Mimì in La bohème (Berlin State Opera). Her 2017 role debuts were Micaëla in Carmen and Alice Ford in Falstaff (Opéra Bastille), Liù in Turandot (Covent Garden), Vitellia in La clemenza di Tito (Palais Garnier). She was to embody all heroines in The Tales of Hoffmann in Munich, but withdrew due to disputes with the conductor causing her to "lose her passion" for the performance. In 2018, she returned to the Met for Pagliacci, and then to the Vienna State Opera for her first Desdemona in Otello and reprise as Liù. She performed Desdemona at the Hamburg State Opera and, later in the year, Violetta at the Paris Opera, where she would sing Desdemona in the same season, and the title role in a concert performance of Luisa Miller at the Opéra de Monte-Carlo.

The year 2019 saw Kurzak's performance as Nedda in several venues such as the NDR Klassik Open Air in Hanover and the Liceu. She starred in Carmen at the Met, and in summer, Franco Zeffirelli's new La traviata production at the Verona Arena, which was a tribute to the late producer. She made two role debuts: Cio-Cio San in an open-air concert performance of Madama Butterfly at the Parade Square in Warsaw, Elisabetta di Valois in Don Carlo at the Paris Opera.

In 2020, Kurzak gave performances as Violetta at the Metropolitan Opera and at the Royal Opera House.

=== Concert and events ===
She was featured in the 2011 Napa Valley Festival del Sole and was a guest performer at the 2012 Semperopernball.

Kurzak was frequently featured in Carl Orff's Carmina Burana as the soprano soloist. In February 2015 she took part in Szymanowski's Stabat Mater conducted by Ingo Metzmacher at the Berliner Philharmonie and Wiener Musikverein. She performed in Nowowiejski's oratorio Quo Vadis on 20 November 2016, and Verdi's Requiem conducted by Jacek Kaspszyk on 27 September 2019, both at the National Philharmonic in Warsaw. She is also an interpreter of songs by Chopin.

== Personal life ==
Kurzak married baritone Jacek Jaskuła, whom she met during college studies, in 2000. He remained in Wrocław while she was pursuing studies and career in Hamburg. They divorced in 2007. She had been in a relationship with Waldemar Dąbrowski, General Director of the Grand Theatre, Warsaw. She met French tenor Roberto Alagna during performances of L'elisir d'amore at the Royal Opera House in 2012. Their daughter, Malena, (Note: Spelling varies between Malena, Maléna, Malèna) was born on 29 January 2014. They married in November 2015, between performances of L'elisir d'amore at the Paris Opera.

== Awards and honors ==
- 1998: 1st place and special prizes of the V Intercollegiate Vocal Competition in Duszniki-Zdrój
- 1998: 1st prize at the International Stanisław Moniuszko Vocal Competition
- 1999: Prize for Young Talent at the Mirjam Helin International Singing Competition in Helsinki
- 2000: Special Prize ("Ajuntament de Moià" scholarship) at the Viñas International Singing Contest
- 2000: Millennium Award from the Mayor of Wrocław
- 2000: Wrocław Music Award
- 2000: 3rd prize at the International Vocal Competition in Canton, China
- 2002: Elise Meyer Preis
- 2006: Dr. Wilhelm Oberdörffer-Preis of season 2005/2006
- 2010: Annual Prize of the Minister of Culture and National Heritage
- 2012: Guarantees of Culture Award (Gwarancje Kultury) from TVP Kultura in the Classical music category for her album Gioia
- 2013: Song and Stage Star of Wiktory 2012
- 2013: Crystal Mirrors (Kryształowe Zwierciadła) Award from Zwierciadło ("Mirror") magazine
- 2015: Readers' Award of the International Opera Awards
- 2015: Gold Cross of Merit
- 2016: "For Merits for Poland and Poles in the World" (Note: Polish: Za zasługi dla Polski i Polaków poza granicami kraju) Award from TVP Polonia
- 2018: Gold Medal for Merit to Culture – Gloria Artis
- 2019: Golden Bowtie (Złota Muszka) of ORFEO Foundation Bogusław Kaczyński

== Opera roles ==
Roles which have been performed on stage or fully recorded in studio. Minor roles during the Hamburg years are omitted.

- Susanna, The Marriage of Figaro (Mozart)
- Rosina, The Barber of Seville (Rossini)
- Hanna, The Haunted Manor (Moniuszko)
- Gilda, Rigoletto (Verdi)
- Papagena, The Magic Flute (Mozart)
- Ninette, The Love for Three Oranges (Prokofiev)
- Queen of the Night, The Magic Flute (Mozart)
- Giannetta, L'elisir d'amore (Donizetti)
- Blonde, Die Entführung aus dem Serail (Mozart)
- Adele, Die Fledermaus (J. Strauss)
- Oberto, Alcina (Handel)
- Fortuna/Damigella, L'incoronazione di Poppea (Monteverdi)
- Marie, Zar und Zimmermann (Lortzing)
- Gretel, Hänsel und Gretel (Humperdinck)
- Marzelline, Fidelio (Beethoven)
- Laura, Der lächerliche Prinz Jodelet (Keiser)
- Nannetta, Falstaff (Verdi)
- Ännchen, Der Freischütz (Weber)
- Maid, Powder Her Face (Adès)
- Musetta, La bohème (Puccini)
- Olympia, The Tales of Hoffmann (Offenbach)
- Cleopatra, Giulio Cesare (Handel)
- Servilia, La clemenza di Tito (Mozart)
- Fiorilla, Il turco in Italia (Rossini)
- Aspasia, Mitridate, re di Ponto (Mozart)
- Marie, La fille du régiment (Donizetti)
- Fraarte, Radamisto (Handel)
- Norina, Don Pasquale (Donizetti)
- Adina, L'elisir d'amore (Donizetti)
- Matilde, Matilde di Shabran (Rossini)
- Donna Anna, Don Giovanni (Mozart)
- Amenaide, Tancredi (Rossini)
- Violetta, La traviata (Verdi)
- Lucia, Lucia di Lammermoor (Donizetti)
- Fiordiligi, Così fan tutte (Mozart)
- Juliette, Roméo et Juliette (Gounod)
- Comtesse Adèle, Le comte Ory (Rossini)
- Maria Stuarda, Maria Stuarda (Donizetti)
- Rachel, La Juive (Halévy)
- Nedda, Pagliacci (Leoncavallo)
- Mimì, La bohème (Puccini)
- Micaëla, Carmen (Bizet)
- Liù, Turandot (Puccini)
- Alice Ford, Falstaff (Verdi)
- Vitellia, La clemenza di Tito (Mozart)
- Desdemona, Otello (Verdi)
- Anita, La Navarraise (Massenet)
- Luisa, Luisa Miller (Verdi)
- Cio-Cio San, Madama Butterfly (Puccini)
- Elisabeth de Valois, Don Carlos (Verdi)
- Santuzza, Cavalleria rusticana (Mascagni)
- Tosca, Tosca (Puccini)

== Publications ==
- Laskowski, Aleksander (2015). Si, Amore – Aleksandra Kurzak w rozmowie z Aleksandrem Laskowskim [Si, Amore – Aleksandra Kurzak in Conversation with Aleksander Laskowski]. Polish Music Publishing House. ISBN 978-8-3224-0960-2.

== Discography ==
Kurzak signed an exclusive contract with Decca Classics in January 2011, being the first-ever Polish singer to do so. She signed to Sony Classical in May 2018. The Szymanowski album won the Album of the Year – Choral Music, Oratorio & Opera in the 2018 Fryderyk Award.

Title	Type	Credits	Details	Peak chart positions		Certifications
Title	Type	Credits	Details	POL	FRA	Certifications
Chopin: Songs	Joint recital	Nelson Goerner; Mariusz Kwiecień	Year: 2009; Label: Fryderyk Chopin Society	—		POL: Gold
Gioia!	Solo recital	Omer Meir Wellber; Orquestra de la Comunitat Valenciana	Year: 2011; Label: Decca Classics	8		POL: Platinum
Hej, kolęda!	Solo recital	Sebastian Karpiel-Bułecka	Year: 2012; Label: Universal Music Poland	16		POL: Gold
Bel Raggio: Rossini Arias	Solo recital	Pier Giorgio Morandi; Sinfonia Varsovia	Year: 2013; Label: Decca Classics	50		
Szymanowski: Litany to the Virgin Mary, Stabat Mater, Symphony No. 3 "The Song of the Night"	Full works	Agnieszka Rehlis / Dmitry Korchak / Artur Ruciński; Jacek Kaspszyk; Warsaw Philharmonic Orchestra & Choir	Year: 2017; Label: Warner Classics			
Nowowiejski: Quo Vadis	Full work	Artur Ruciński / Rafał Siwek; Piotr Sułkowski; Warmia and Mazury Philharmonic Orchestra	Year: 2017; Label: Dux Records			
Massenet: La Navarraise	Full work	Roberto Alagna / George Andguladze; Brian Kontes / Issachah Savage / Michael Anthony McGee; Alberto Veronesi; Opera Orchestra of New York / New York Choral Ensemble	Year: 2018; Label: Warner Classics			
Deliverance	Single	Roberto Alagna	Year: 2018; Label: Deutsche Grammophon			
Puccini in Love	Joint recital	Roberto Alagna; Riccardo Frizza; Sinfonia Varsovia	Year: 2018; Label: Sony Classical	—	38	
Desire	Solo recital	Frédéric Chaslin; Morphing Chamber Orchestra	Year: 2020; Label: Sony Classical			
"—" denotes a recording that did not chart or was not released in that territory.
