= La Navarraise =

Opera by Jules Massenet

- Opera by Jules Massenet
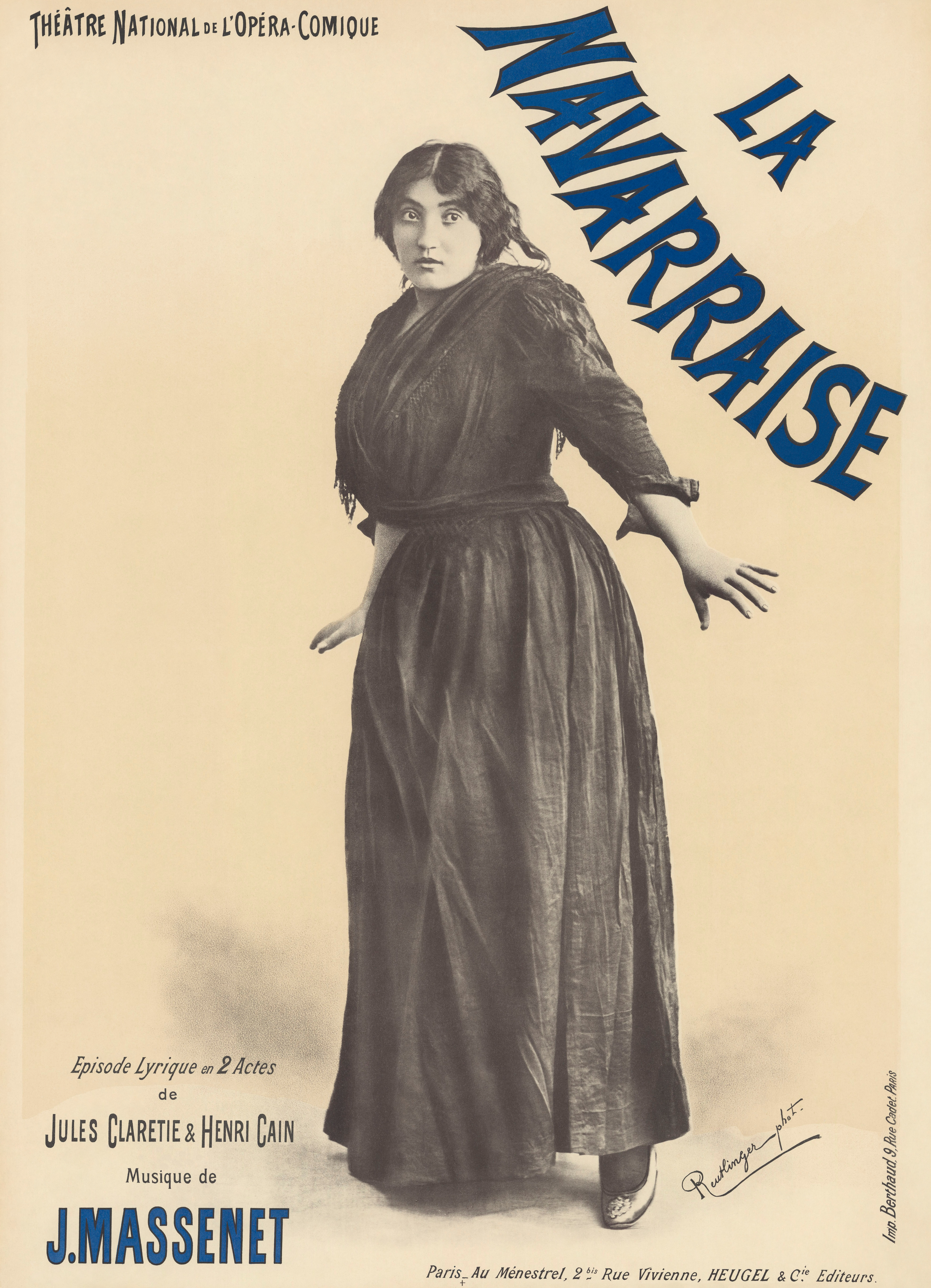
- Poster showing Emma Calvé in the title role
- Librettist: Jules Claretie; Henri Cain
- Language: French
- Based on: La Cigarette by Jules Claretie
- Premiere: 20 June 1894; Covent Garden, London

La Navarraise ([la na.va.ʁɛz], "The Woman of Navarre") is an opera in two acts by Jules Massenet to a French libretto by Jules Claretie and Henri Cain, based on Claretie's short story La cigarette (1890). It was first performed at Covent Garden in London on 20 June 1894, with Emma Calvé in the title role.

The first performance was attended by the Prince of Wales and a command performance was then given at Windsor Castle. Flon conducted the Brussels premiere on 26 November 1894 with Georgette Leblanc in the title role, while Calvé returned for the Paris premiere by the Opéra-Comique at their temporary quarters on the Place du Châtelet (the present Théâtre de la Ville) on 3 October 1895, which led to more than 180 performances of the work by the company over the next 60 years.

La Navarraise is widely agreed to be Massenet's answer to Italian verismo and was very popular in its day, often being performed on a double bill with Mascagni's Cavalleria rusticana. Its popularity has waned since operatic tastes changed in the early part of the twentieth century, and today the opera is rarely performed. However, at the Wexford Festival in October/November 2013, La Navarraise was performed in a double bill with Massenet's Thérèse. It has, however, been recorded a number of times, most notably in 1975 where two versions were recorded, one with Marilyn Horne and Plácido Domingo, the other with Lucia Popp and Alain Vanzo.

== Roles ==
Role	Voice type	Premiere cast, 20 June 1894 (Conductor: Philippe Flon)
Anita (La Navarraise)	mezzo-soprano	Emma Calvé
Araquil, sergeant of the Biscay regiment	tenor	Albert Alvarez
Garrido	bass	Pol Plançon
Remigio, father of Araquil	baritone	Charles Gilibert
Ramon, captain of Biscay regiment	tenor	Claude Bonnard
Bustamente	baritone	Eugène Dufriche
Chorus: Basque women, officers, wounded soldiers, peasants, a doctor, a chaplain

== Synopsis ==
Place: Spain
Time: Carlist War in 1874.

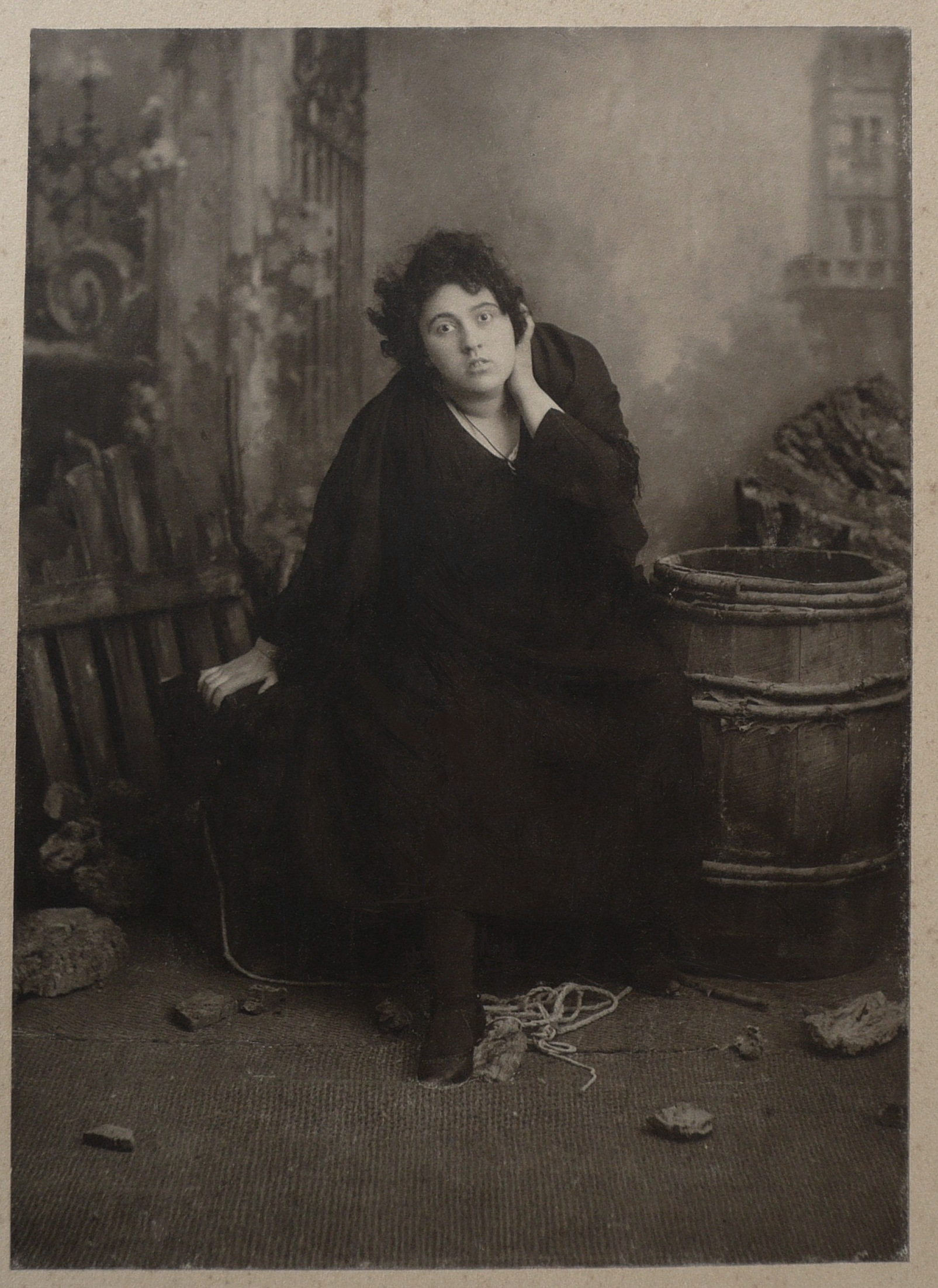
Eugenia Burzio as Anita

A lowly-born girl from Navarre, Anita (La Navarraise), is in love with a soldier, Araquil. Araquil's father, Remigio, finds Anita unacceptable and insists she pay a sum of two-thousand duros as a dowry, knowing she will not be able to raise the money. Hearing this, Anita sings a song of lament while the commander Garrido sings of his hate towards the enemy Commander, Zuccaraga (after hearing of his friend's death by Zuccaraga's hands). Anita hears Garrido, and proposes that she kill Zuccaraga for a sum of two-thousand duros. Garrido, though wary and suspicious, accepts the offer. Garrido asks for her name, but she only dashes off saying "I am only the 'girl from Navarre.'" Anita is spotted going to the enemy camp by the soldier, Ramon. When Ramon hears that Araquil is looking for Anita, he (Ramon) tells Araquil that she is in the enemy camp. Ramon misinterprets this, thinking that Anita is actually a spy, and Araquil thinks that she has gone to see a secret lover in the enemy camp.

After an orchestral intermezzo, Anita is successful in killing Zuccaraga and obtains her reward, but is told to swear not tell anyone. Just then, Araquil is brought in, having been mortally wounded searching for Anita. He confronts Anita who, under oath not to tell anyone, can only say "I did nothing wrong." When he sees the money she has received, he accuses her of selling herself, to which she violently objects. Then Remigio, Ramon and the doctor appear on the scene. Bells can be heard in the distance and Araquil asks his father why they are ringing. Remigio tells him that Zuccaraga was assassinated. Araquil looks at Anita again, only then realizing the truth; with the final words "the price of blood! how horrible!" he dies. Anita collapses in horror, and attempts to kill herself. While searching for a suicide weapon, she finds a statue of the Virgin Mary. She becomes crazy with the death of Araquil and speaks as if he were still there: "Araquil! I have the dowry... We must go... The church is full! Happiness is at hand!" Then, she falls into senseless, wild laughter, as the opera ends with Garrido saying "La folie! la folie!" ("Poor demented child, poor demented child!").

== Recordings ==
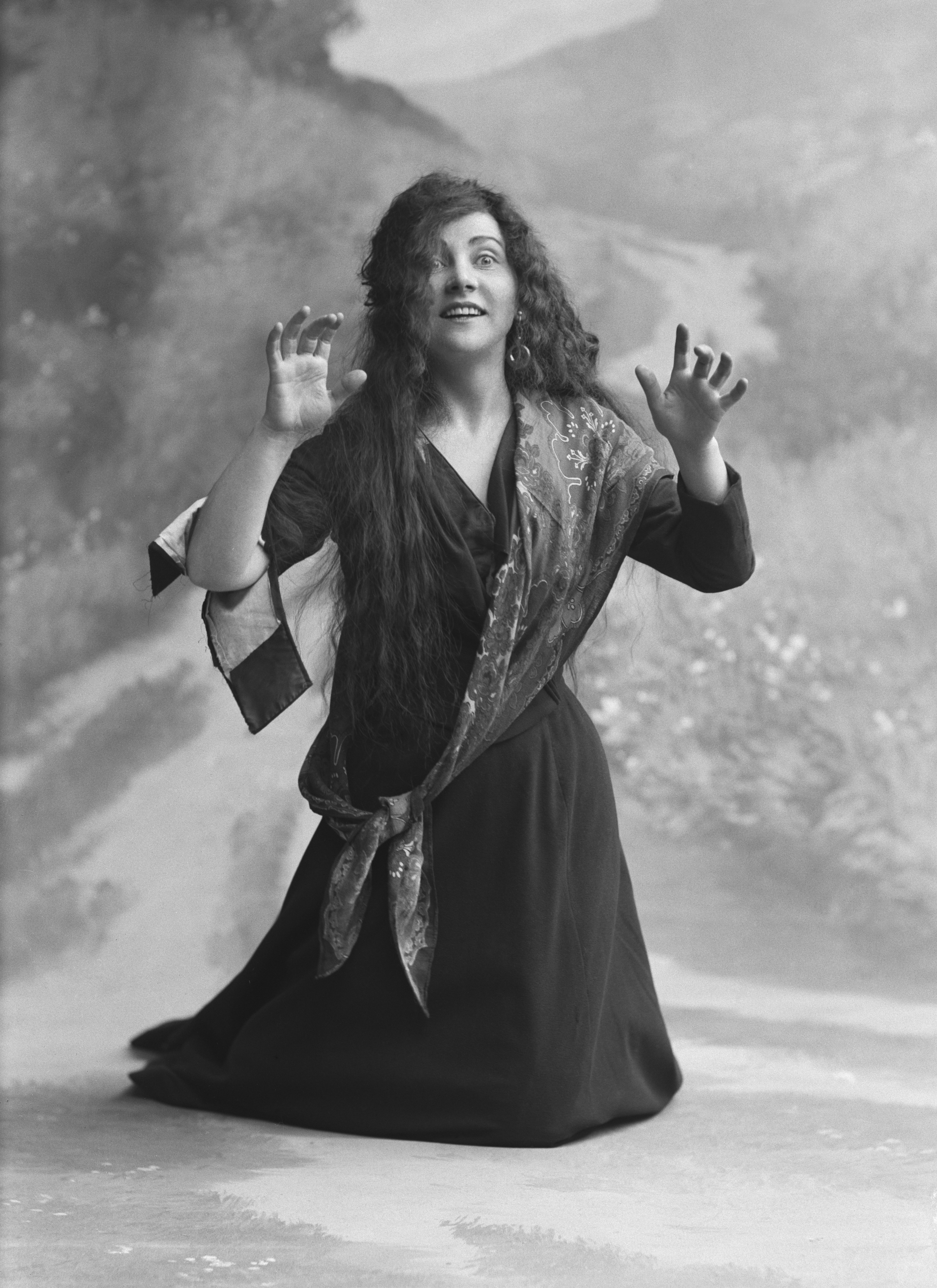
Lilly Walleni in the title role at the Royal Swedish Opera in 1906

The information for the recordings is from Brian Capon's opera discography website.

- 1963 – Geneviève Moizan (Anita), Alain Vanzo (Araquil); Jacques Mars (Garrido), Lucien Lovano (Remigio), Marcel Vigneron (Bustamente), Joseph Peyron (Ramon); Chorus and orchestra of the Radio Television Française, conducted by Jean-Claude Hartemann. Recorded from a radio broadcast of 29 November 1963; issued in 2004 on Gala CD cat. no. GL 100.747 (2 CDs; also includes a 15 December 1973 recording of Le jongleur de Notre-Dame).
- 1975 – Lucia Popp (Anita), Alain Vanzo (Araquil), Vincenzo Sardinero (Garrido), Gérard Souzay (Remigio), Claude Méloni (Bustamente), Michel Sénéchal (Ramon), Claude Méloni (Un soldat); London Symphony Orchestra, Ambrosian Opera Chorus, conducted by Antonio de Almeida. Studio recording (March 1975, London) issued on 1 LP – Columbia M-33506 (USA); CBS 76403 (UK); CBS "Masterworks" DC 40134 (UK).
- 1975 – Marilyn Horne (Anita), Plácido Domingo (Araquil); Sherrill Milnes (Garrido), Nicola Zaccaria (Remigio), Gabriel Bacquier (Bustamente), Ryland Davies (Ramon), Leslie Fyson (Un soldat); London Symphony Orchestra, Ambrosian Opera Chorus, conducted by Henry Lewis. Studio recording (July 1975, London) issued on 1 LP – RCA Red Seal ARL1-1114 – 1 CD – RCA Red Seal 50167-2

An additional recording not mentioned in the above source is:

- 2018 - Aleksandra Kurzak (Anita), Roberto Alagna (Araquil); George Andguladze (Garrido), Brian Kontes (Remigio), Michael Anthony McGee (Bustamente), Issachah Savage (Ramon); Opera Orchestra of New York, New York Choral Ensemble, conducted by Alberto Veronesi. Studio recording (November 2011 - May 2017, various locations), Warner Classics.
