= Miguel Ángel Gómez Martínez =

Spanish conductor and composer (1949–2024)

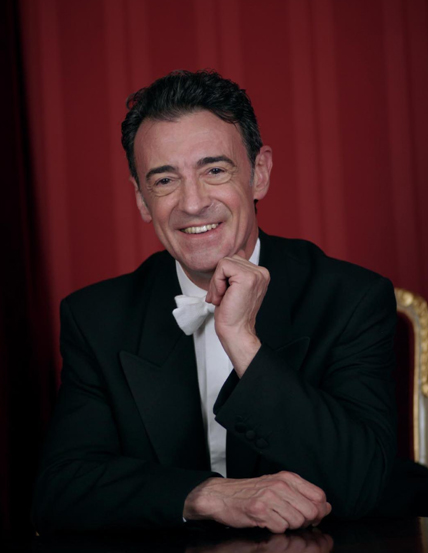
- Gómez Martínez in 2011
- Born: 17 September 1949; Granada, Spain
- Died: 4 August 2024 (aged 74); Málaga, Spain
- Occupations: Composer, conductor
- Spouse: Alessandra Ruiz-Zuñiga Macías
- Awards: Order of Civil Merit
- Website: miguelgomezmartinez.net

Miguel Ángel Gómez Martínez (17 September 1949 – 4 August 2024) was a Spanish conductor and composer. He was known for memorizing all of the players' parts and conducting without looking at the score. He held international leading chief conductor positions, including the RTVE Symphony Orchestra, Nationaltheater Mannheim, Orquesta de Valencia and Bern Theatre. His compositions include Sinfonía del descubrimiento.

== Life and career ==
=== Education ===
Gómez Martínez was born in Granada on 17 September 1949 into a family of musicians; his father was a professor in the Band of Granada and his mother a pianist. He was determined to become a conductor since childhood.

At age five, he was able to pass an examination at the Victoria Eugenia Music Conservatory of Granada, and at age seven, he climbed to the podium and conducted. He did not only steadily lead the professors of the Band, but also corrected errors made by the transcriber in the score.

At age 13, he began teaching piano at the Granada Conservatory. In 1964 he moved to Madrid to study at the Madrid Royal Conservatory, and graduated with a First Class Diploma and the Prize of the Conservatory. He continued his studies of orchestra andchoral conducting in Vienna with Hans Swarowsky. He graduated at age 21, with the Prize of the Austrian Ministry of Education and Sciences.

=== Conductor ===
Gómez Martínez made his debut as a conductor in Sankt Pölten near Vienna in 1973 and then conducted in Lucerne. He conducted Beethoven's Fidelio in Berlin. He first conducted in Spain in 1975 at Granada's International Music and Dance Festival.

He became chief conductor and artistic director of several international orchestras: conductor at the Vienna State Opera (1976–1982), and later guest conductor, chief conductor of the Spanish RTVE Symphony Orchestra (1984–1987), and chief conductor of the Teatro de la Zarzuela in Madrid (1985–1991). He became chief conductor of the Basque National Orchestra (1989–1993), Generalmusikdirektor (GMD) in Mannheim (1990–1993), musical and artistic director of the New Finnish National Opera Helsinki (1993–1996), chief conductor of the Symphoniker Hamburg (1992–2000) who named him honorary conductor, chief conductor of the Orquesta de Valencia (1997–2004) GMD of the Bern Theatre (2000–2004), manager at the Nationaltheater Mannheim (2004–2005) and from 2004 also musical director of the Easter Festival Orchestra in Bayreuth.

During his career he conducted orchestras in Europe, the US and the Far East, as well as most Spanish Orchestras. He worked with singers such as Boris Christoff, Birgit Nilsson, Cesare Siepi, Alfredo Kraus, Luciano Pavarotti, Montserrat Caballé, Plácido Domingo, Ainhoa Arteta and Leo Nucci.

Gomez Martínez was known for his ability to memorise scores. He made recordings, including Rossini's Il barbiere di Siviglia with Elīna Garanča for Sony, the five Piano Concertos by Heitor Villa-Lobos with pianist Cristina Ortiz for Decca, works by Joaquín Turina for MDG, and Donizetti's Requiem for Orfeo, with Cheryl Studer, Aldo Baldin, Jan-Hendrik Rootering, and the Bamberg Symphony Orchestra.

=== Composer ===
Gómez Martínez also composed but restricted composing to times without other commitments, such as between concerts and on board airplanes. Among his works stand out Suite Burlesca (1972), Sinfonía del descubrimiento (Symphony of the Discovery) (1992) with the occasion of the 500th anniversary of the discovery of America, Five songs on Poems by Alonso Gamo (1996) for soprano and orchestra, Sinfonía del Agua (Water Symphony) (2007) commissioned by Emasagra, Morning dawning (Passacaglia) (2010), his only opera Atallah, Letters from a lover, a work for baritone and symphony orchestra dedicated to his wife, Alessandra, a Piano Concerto and a Violin Concerto.

He recorded his orchestral works Sinfonia del descubrimiento and Canciones with soprano Marussa Xyni and the Hamburger Symphoniker. A reviewer from Gramophone described him in 1999 as a "readily communicative composer of fastidious gifts" and added: "The two works here combine a strong lyrical and dramatic impulse with a tasteful sprinkling of local colour. Passionately committed performances under the composer's direction, finely recorded.".

=== Personal life ===
Gómez Martínez was married to Alessandra Ruiz-Zúñiga, to whom he dedicated a five-piece orchestral song cycle, setting their love letters to music.

He died in Malaga on 4 August 2024, at the age of 74, after having been suddenly taken to a hospital.

== Awards ==
Gómez Martínez was awarded the Gold Medal of the City of Granada for his extraordinary artistic merits in 1984. He was designated 'Citizen of Granada of the 20th Century' by the Town of Granada. In 1995, King Juan Carlos I awarded him the Encomienda de Número of the Order of Civil Merit. The Ministry of Culture of the State of Bavaria named him The Lion of Bavaria for his work leading the Young Orchestra of the Easter Festival in Bayreuth. He was a member of the Royal Academy of Fine Arts of Granada. and an honorary member of different musical associations in Spain and Europe.

Cultural offices
Preceded by Odón Alonso	Directors, RTVE Symphony Orchestra; 1984–1987	Succeeded by Arpad Joó
Preceded by Manuel Galduf	Directors, Valencia Orchestra; 1997–2005	Succeeded by Yaron Traub
