= Lorenzo Palomo =

Spanish composer and conductor (1938–2024)

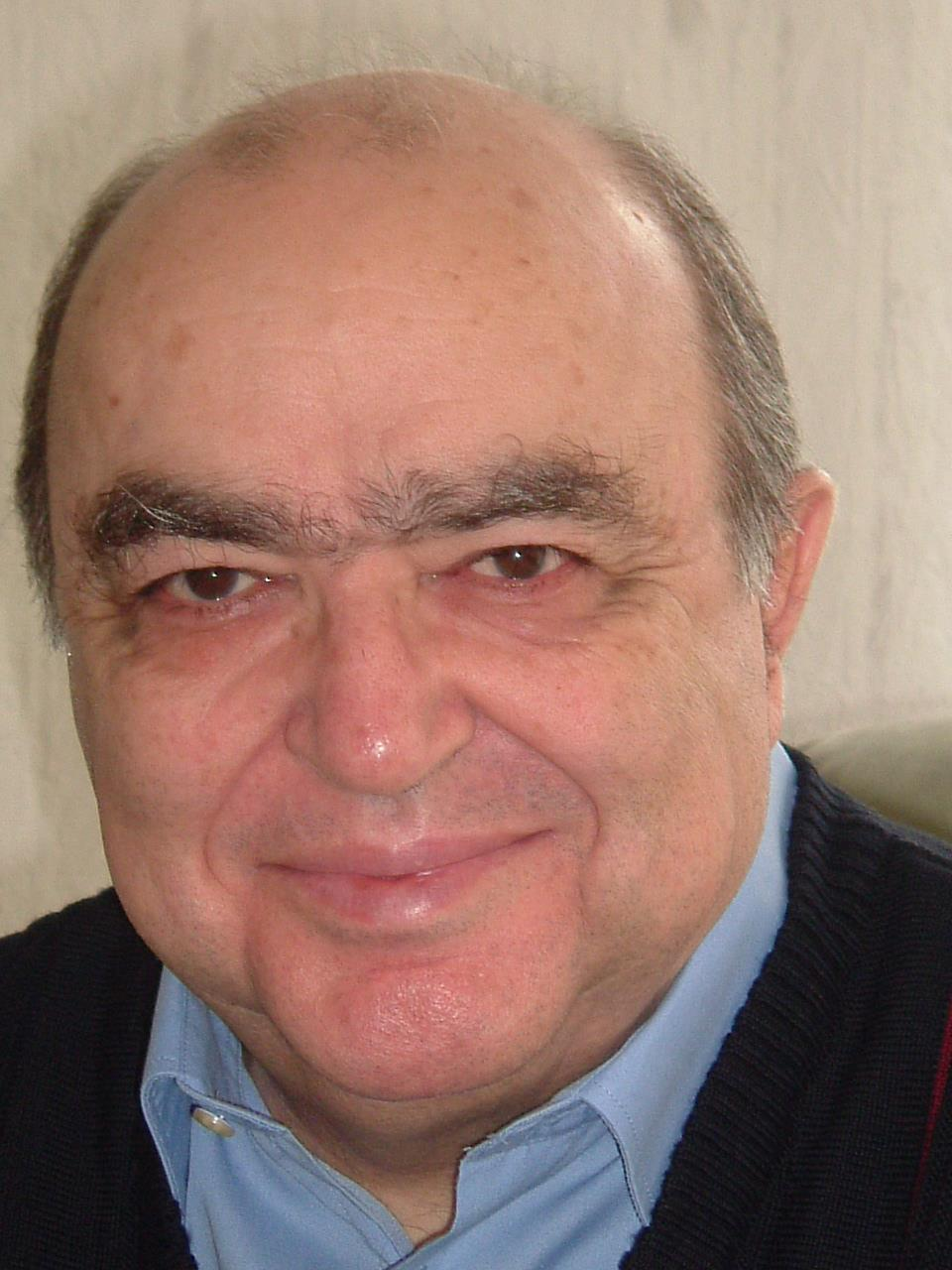
- Palomo in 2017
- Born: 10 March 1938; Ciudad Real, Spain
- Died: 13 April 2024 (aged 86); Madrid, Spain
- Occupations: Composer; Conductor
- Organizations: Valencia Orchestra; Deutsche Oper Berlin
- Awards: Order of Isabella the Catholic
- Website: www.lorenzopalomo.com

Lorenzo Palomo (10 March 1938 – 13 April 2024) was a Spanish composer and conductor. He was chief conductor of the Valencia Orchestra from 1973 to 1976 and conductor and pianist of the Deutsche Oper Berlin from 1981 to 2004. Several of his compositions, often based on Andalusian traditions, were performed internationally and were recorded.

== Biography ==
Soon after his birth in Ciudad Real in 1938, where his father was stationed during the Spanish Civil War, his mother returned with him to Pozoblanco where the family lived. Shortly afterwards, they moved to Córdoba where the composer spent his youth. Palomo studied piano and harmony at the Córdoba Conservatory and at the age of twenty he entered the Barcelona Conservatory, where he studied composition with Joaquín Zamacois and piano with Sofía Puche de Mendlewicz. He studied conducting further with Boris Goldovsky in New York City, with a scholarship from the Fundación Juan March.

He was chief conductor of the Valencia Orchestra from 1973 to 1976 and conductor and pianist of the Deutsche Oper Berlin from 1981 to 2004.

His ballet La leyenda del Monte Bangkay was premiered in Manila, Philippines, in 1980. His song cycle Canciones españolas (Spanish Songs) was first performed by Montserrat Caballé at Carnegie Hall in New York City in 1987. His Nocturnos de Andalucía (Andalusian Nocturnes) for guitar and orchestra was premiered by Pepe Romero and the Berlin Radio Symphony Orchestra at the Konzerthaus Berlin in 1996. His music was performed in concert halls including Symphony Hall in Boston), Suntory Hall in Tokyo and Auditorium Tschaikowsky in Moscow.

Palomo lived in Berlin for 38 years, but returned to Madrid in 2019. In 2022, he dedicated a new composition to the city of Córdoba on the occasion of the thirtieth anniversary of the Orquesta de Córdoba, Canto a Córdoba, setting a text by Juana Castro Muñoz.

Palomo died in Madrid on 13 April 2024, at the age of 86.

== Works ==
Palomo composed many works for the voice, such as songs and song cycles, sometimes with optional accompaniment by harp or orchestra instead of piano. Several works were recorded.

His compositions are, according to his works list:

=== Compositions ===
- La leyenda del Monte Bangkay, ballet
- Del atardecer al alba, song cycle for voice and piano or orchestra
- Tientos, song for voice and piano or orchestra
- Plenilunio, song for voice and piano or orchestra
- Una primavera andaluza, song cycle setting lyrics by Juan Ramón Jiménez for voice and piano or orchestra
- Nocturnos de Andalucía, concertante suite for guitar and orchestra
- FdB – Música para un festival, for orchestra
- Andalusian Divertimento, piano trio
- Concierto de Cienfuegos, for four guitars and orchestra
- Cantos del alma, suite soprano, clarinet and orchestra
- Madrigal y Cinco canciones sefardíes, song cycle for voice and guitar or piano or harp
- Dulcinea, cantata for soprano, alto, tenor, bass, chorus and orchestra
- Danza-Scherzo', for oboe and piano
- Sinfonía a Granada, for soprano, guitar and orchestra
- Fanfarria para una noche de estío, for trombone quartet
- Toccata, for guitar
- Nocturno y Danza, for orchestra
- Rebeka's Rainbow, fong for voice and piano
- Mi jardín solitario, song cycle for voice and guitar or piano
- Perlas y lágrimas, for guitar
- Helianthus, for guitar
- El amor de los dos ositos, symphonic fairy-tale for soprano, mezzo-soprano and orchestra
- Pinceladas de primavera, suite for two guitars
- Fulgores, for violin, guitar and orchestra
- The Sneetches (Dr. Seuss' The Sneetches), symphonic poem for narrator and orchestra or two pianos
- Caribiana, for orchestra
- Sinfonía Córdoba, for orchestra, including a short intervention of voice and guitar
- Humoresca, for double bass and orchestra
- Arabescos, for violin and orchestra
- Fantasía sobre temas del folklore alemán, for violin and guitar
- Escenas de una primavera alemana, song cycle for voice and guitar
- Aldonza y Alonso, for soprano, tenor, chorus and piano
- Rumbalina, for clarinet and piano
- Sendero mágico, song cycle for voice and piano
- El jardín de Baco, for marimba and orchestra

== Recordings ==
- Dulcinea, with soloists, chorus and orchestra of the Deutsche Oper Berlin conducted by Miguel Ángel Gómez Martínez, recorded live in 2006 at Konzerthaus Berlin
- My Secluded Garden
  - Madrigal y Cinco canciones sefardíes
  - Concierto de Cienfuegos
- Sinfonía Córdoba / Fulgores, recorded in 2016 by soloists and the Castile and León Symphony Orchestra conducted by Jesús López Cobos.
- Andalusian Nocturnes
  - Spanish Songs
- Cantos del alma

== Honours ==
In 2010 Palomo was knighted into the Order of Isabella the Catholic by King Juan Carlos I of Spain for his work disseminating the culture of Spain worldwide through his music.
