= Valencia Orchestra =

Symphony orchestra in Valencia, Spain

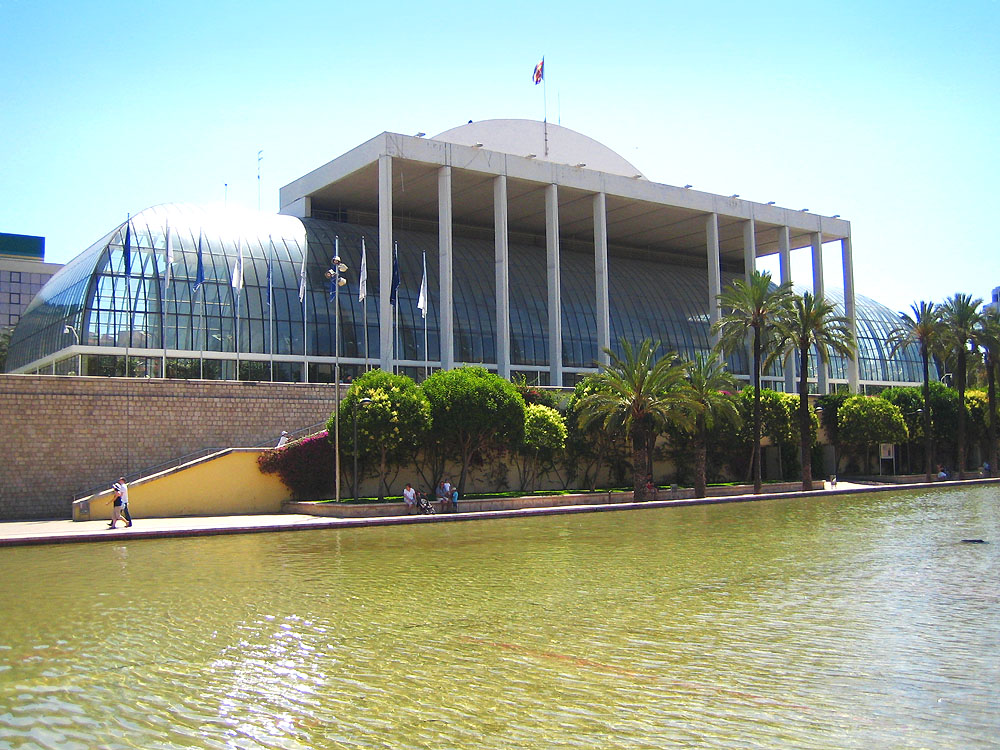
Palau de la Música de València

The Valencia Orchestra (Valencian: Orquestra de València, Spanish: Orquesta de Valencia) is a symphony orchestra in Valencia, Spain. It was founded in 1943 as the Valencia Municipal Orchestra, and a member of the Spanish Association of Symphony Orchestras (AEOS). The Valencia Orchestra, which first performed abroad in 1950 under José Iturbi, has toured internationally more regularly in the last 20 years. It performs mainly at the city's Palau de la Música de València.

== History ==
The Orchestra of València was established in 1943, led by Joan Lamote de Grignon. Its history features international tours to countries such as England, France (1950), Italy, Turkey (1996 with Mstislav Rostropovich as soloist), Germany (2002), Austria, and the Czech Republic (2008 with pianist Joaquín Achúcarro), and participation in the Schleswig-Holstein Music Festival and Neuer Musik festival in Zurich.

The roster of resident conductors includes Hans von Benda, Napoleone Annovazzi, José Iturbi, Enrique García Asensio, and others, with Alexander Liebreich currently serving as music director and Chief Conductor. Guest conductors have included notable figures like Ataúlfo Argenta, Sergiu Celibidache, Riccardo Chailly, and Valery Gergiev.

Soloists who have performed with the orchestra encompass Daniel Barenboim, Mstislav Rostropovich, among others. The orchestra has also accompanied singers such as Victoria de los Ángeles, Plácido Domingo, and Montserrat Caballé.

The Orchestra has premiered works by composers like José Evangelista and Antón García Abril and has a diverse recording portfolio, including pieces by Beethoven, Liszt, and Spanish composers like Manuel de Falla and Joaquín Rodrigo. Significant premieres include the opera "Maror" by Manuel Palau.

== Principal Conductors ==
- Joan Lamote de Grignon (1943–49)
- Hans von Benda (1949–1952)
- Napoleone Annovazzi
- Heinz Unger
- José Iturbi
- Enrique García Asensio (1964–65)
- Pedro Pírfano (1967–1970)
- Luis Antonio García Navarro (1970–74)
- Lorenzo Palomo (1974–1980)
- Benito Lauret (1980–1983)
- Manuel Galduf (1983–1997)
- Miguel Ángel Gómez Martínez (1997–2005)
- Yaron Traub (2005–2018)
- Ramón Tebar (2018-2021)
- Alexander Liebreich (2022-)
