= George Andguladze =

Georgian operatic bass

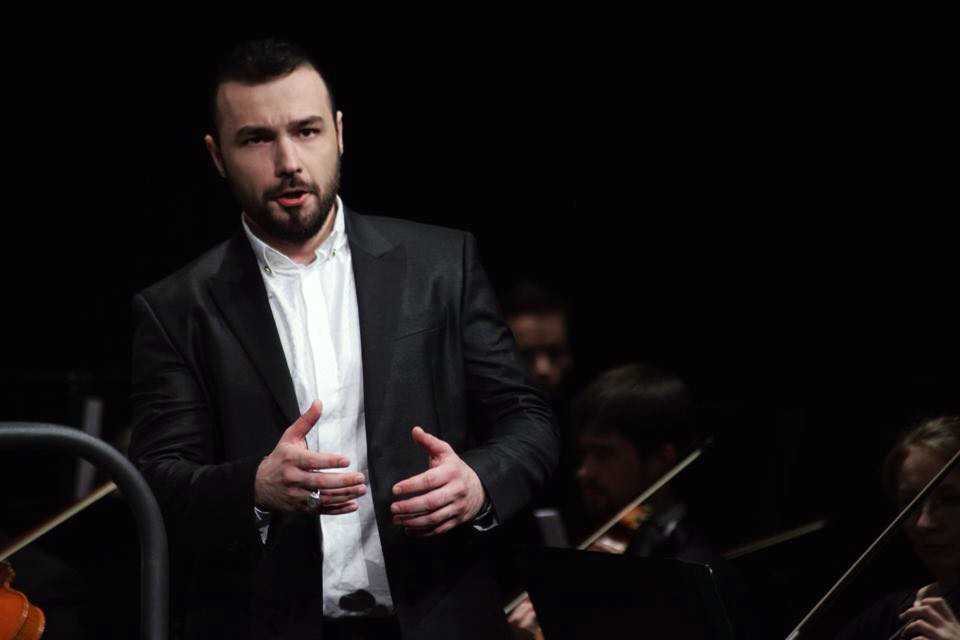
- Born: George Andguladze; August 6, 1984 (age 41); Tbilisi, Georgia
- Occupation: operatic bass
- Website: georgeandguladze.com

George Andguladze (Georgian: გიორგი ანდღულაძე; August 6, 1984) is a Georgian operatic bass.

Born in Tbilisi, Georgian SSR, he graduated from the Accademia delle voci Verdiane and began his operatic career in Italy at Festival Verdi singing Ferrando from Il Trovatore.

== Education ==
In 2000/2001 Andguladze won a scholarship offered by the President of the State of Georgia, Eduard Shevardnadze. In 1999 he finished his studies of piano at Zurab Andjaparidze music school. In 2002, he completed his studies at Meliton Balanchivadze in Tbilisi, where he graduated in Choral and Orchestral Conducting. In 2003 he graduated at the Accademia delle voci Verdiane in Busseto, where he also participated in some events organized by Fondazione Arturo Toscanini. Later he attended a master classes program with Renato Bruson and he graduated in lyrical singing at the conservatory of Reggio nell'Emilia with Mauro Trombetta.

== Career ==
In 2009 Andguladze debuted at the Teatro Comunale in Ferrara as Buonafede in Haydn's Il mondo della luna. In 2011 he appeared in Parma in Pergolesi's La serva padrona, that was later performed on the stages of Emilia Romagna. In July 2011 he participated in the Bellagio Festival, Lake Como, once again with La serva padrona. In October of the same year he participated in as Ferrando in Verdi's Il Trovatore, performed as a concert conducted by Michelle Mariotti at the Teatro Verdi in Busseto and Teatro Magniani in Fidenza, inside the season of the Festival Verdi.

Some of his subsequent appearances include:

- Ramfis, Aida (Verdi) - Teatro Regio di Parma, conductor Antonio Fogliani 2012
- Jorg, Stiffelio (Verdi) - Teatro Regio di Parma, conductor Andrea Battistoni 2012
- Monterone, Rigoletto (Verdi) - Teatro Regio di Parma, Festival Verdi, conductor Daniel Oren 2012
- Basso, Requiem (Verdi) - Fondazione Pergolesi Spontini di Jesi 2013
- Escamillo, Carmen (Bizet) - Luglio Musicale Trapanese, director Ivo Lipanovich 2014
- Haushofmeister, Capriccio (Strauss, extract) - Auditorium Rainer III, Montecarlo, conductor Jeffrey Tate 2015
- Escamillo, Carmen - Galina Vishnevskaya Opera Center, Moscow, conductor Walter Attanasi 2015
- Il Re, Aida - Teatro Sociale di Rovigo, conductor Marco Boemi 2015
- Escamillo, Carmen - Sejong Center for the Performing Arts, Korea, conductor Gaetano Soliman 2015
- Il Re, Aida - Teatro Verdi di Pisa, conductor Marco Boemi 2016
- Bass, Stabat Mater (Rossini) - Basilica Santa Maria in Aracoeli, Rome, conductor Gianluigi Gelmetti 2016
- Massimiliano, I masnadieri (Verdi) - Teatro Verdi di Busseto, Festival Verdi, conductor Simon Krecic 2016
- Filippo II, Don Carlo (Verdi) - Opera Romana Craiova 2016
- Commendatore, Don Giovanni (Mozart) - Kongresove Centrum, Zlin 2016
- Fiesco, Simon Boccanegra (Verdi) - Opera Romana Craiova 2016
- Ramfis, Aida - Opera Kazan, Festival Shalyapin 2017
- Ramfis, Aida - Tbilisi Opera and Ballet State Theatre, conductor Daniel Oren 2017
- Bass, Messa di Requiem (Donizetti) - Basilica Santa Maria in Aracoeli, Rome, conductor Gianluigi Gelmetti 2017
- Massimiliano, I masnadieri - Teatro Verdi di Busseto, conductor Simon Krecic 2017
- Timur, Turandot (Puccini) - 63° Festival Pucciniano, Torre del Lago, conductor Alberto Veronesi 2017
- Il Re, Aida - Arena di Verona, conductor Andrea Battistoni 2017
- Il Re, Aida - Teatro Petruzzelli di Bari, conductor Giampaolo Bisanti 2017
- Oroveso, Norma (Bellini) - Teatro Giuseppe Verdi di Salerno, conductor Daniel Oren 2017
- Zaccaria, Nabucco (Verdi) - Teatro Goldoni di Livorno, conductor Marco Severi 2017
- Sparafucile, Rigoletto - Teatro Regio di Parma, conductor Francesco Ivan Ciampa 2018

=== Repertory ===
Role	Opera	Composer
Oroveso	Norma	Bellini
Escamillo	Carmen	Bizet
Dulcamara	L'elisir d'amore	Donizetti
Bass	Messa di Requiem	Donizetti
Buonafede	Il mondo della luna	Haydn
Don Giovanni	Don Giovanni	Mozart
Bass	Requiem	Mozart
Uberto	La serva padrona	Pergolesi
Timur	Turandot	Puccini
Bass	Petite messe solennelle	Rossini
Bass	Stabat Mater	Rossini
Haushofmeister	Capriccio	Strauss
Il Re	Aida	Verdi
Ramfis	Aida	Verdi
Filippo II	Don Carlo	Verdi
Ferrando	Il trovatore	Verdi
Massimiliano	I masnadieri	Verdi
Zaccaria	Nabucco	Verdi
Bass	Requiem	Verdi
Sparafucile	Rigoletto	Verdi
Fiesco	Simon Boccanegra	Verdi
Jorg	Stiffelio	Verdi

== DVD ==
Year	Opera	Role	Cast	Conductor	Director	Orchestra and chorus	Discography
2012	Aida	Ramfis	Carlo Malinverno, Mariana Pentcheva, Susanna Branchini, Walter Fraccaro, Alberto Gazale, Guanqun Yu	Antonio Fogliani	Joseph Franconi Lee	Orchestra and Chorus Teatro Regio di Parma	Naxos
2012	Stiffelio	Jorg	Roberto Aronica, Guanqun Yu, Roberto Frontali, Gabriele Mangione, Cosimo Vassallo, Lorelay Solis	Andrea Battistoni	Guy Montavon	Orchestra and Chorus Teatro Regio di Parma	Naxos
2017	Turandot	Timur	Martina Serafin, Amadi Lagha, George Andguladze, Angela De Lucia, Andrea Zaupa, Ugo Tarquini, Tiziano Barontini	Alberto Veronesi	Alfonso Signorini	Orchestra e Coro del Festival Puccini	Mondadori
