= Rafał Siwek =

Polish opera singer

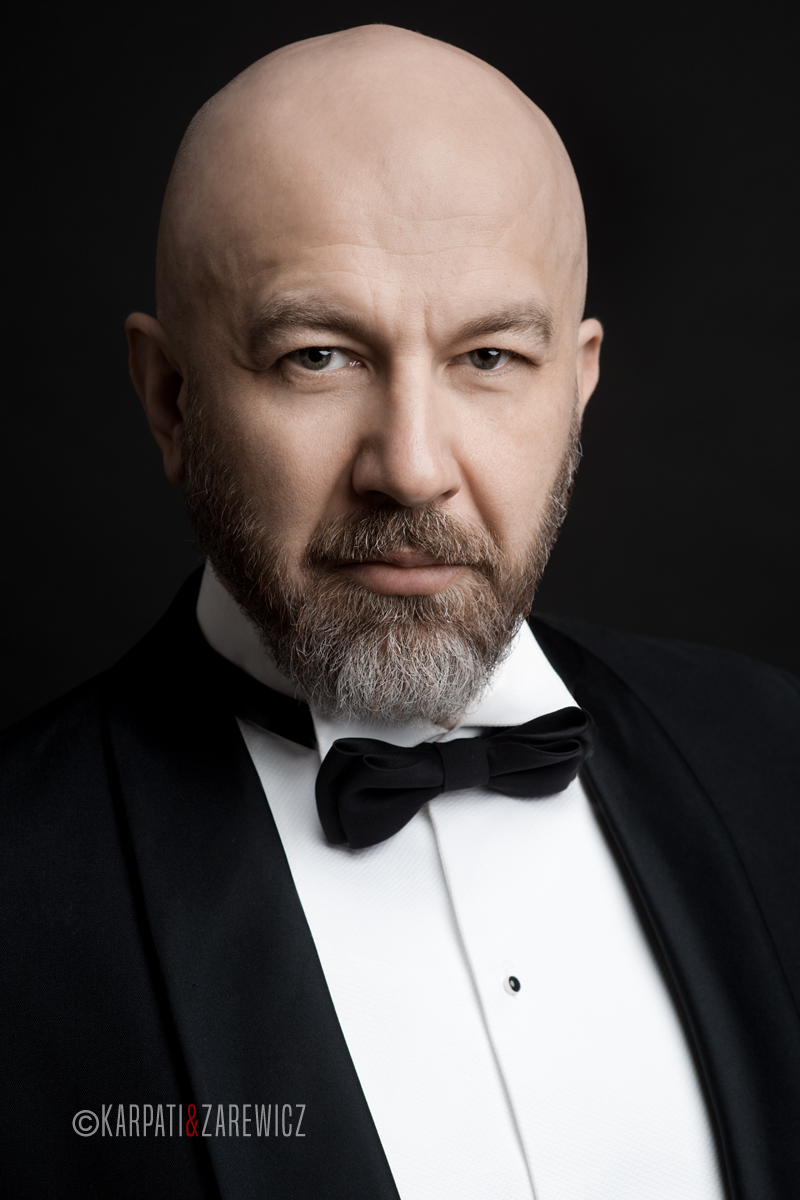
- Occupation: Opera singer (basso)

Rafał Siwek is a Polish opera singer (bass).

== Education ==
Rafał Siwek is a graduate of Fryderyk Chopin University of Music in Warsaw (Professor Jerzy Knetig's class). He mastered his voice under the supervision of Kaludi Kaludov and during the masterclasses taught by Alexandrina Milcheva and Ryszard Karczykowski.

He received numerous awards at vocal competitions, e.g. Moniuszko Vocal Competition in Warsaw (2001), International Hans Gabor Belvedere Singing Competition in Vienna (2001), and Competizione dell'Opera in Dresden (2002).

== Operatic career ==
Siwek made his opera debut in 2000 at Wrocław Opera (Ferrando in Verdi's Il trovatore). For a few years since 2001 he was a soloist of Warsaw Chamber Opera, where he sang the parts of Sarastro (Die Zauberflöte), Basilio (Il barbiere di Siviglia), Seneca (L'incoronazione di Poppea) and Il Commendatore (Don Giovanni).

In 2002, he made his debut at Polish National Opera as Gremin in Eugene Onegin, later appearing also in Die Zauberflöte (Sarastro), Lucia di Lammermoor (Raimondo), Nabucco (Zaccaria), Rigoletto (Sparafucile), Turandot (Timur), and The Haunted Manor (Zbigniew).

In 2003, he performed at Thėâtre du Chatelet in Paris in Szymanowski's King Roger. The same year he sang the part of Tibault d’Arc in The Maid of Orleans in Concertgebouw in Amsterdam and Il Commendatore in Don Giovanni at Théâtre Royal de la Monnaie in Brussels.

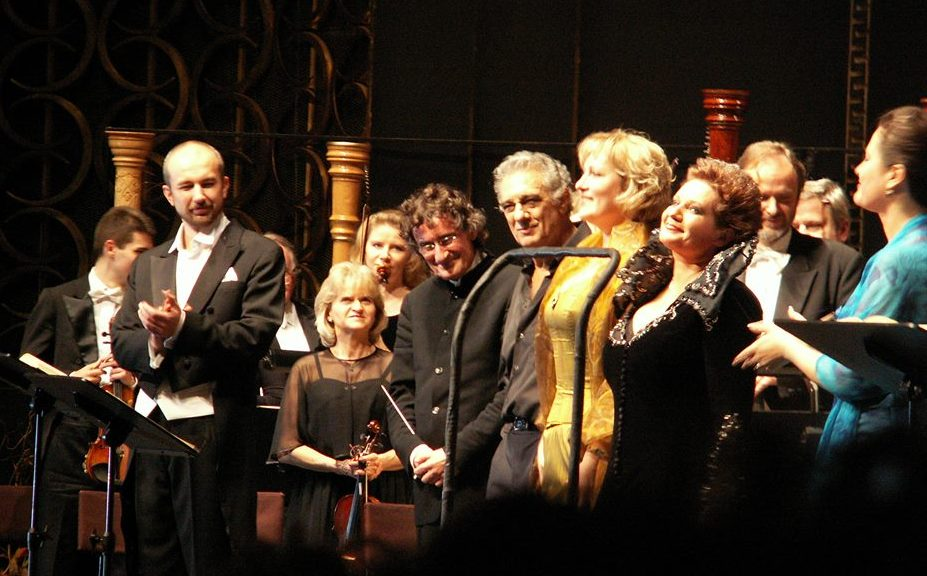
Rafał Siwek during Concert performance of Wagner’s Die Walküre, Polish National Opera, 2005 (with z Plácido Domingo, Jacek Kaspszyk, Mlada Khudoley i Elżbieta Kaczmarzyk-Janczak), photo: K. Gardzina

In 2005, at the invitation of Zubin Mehta, Siwek sang the bass part in Verdi's Requiem at Accademia Nazionale di Santa Cecilia in Rome. His other performances that year include the appearance at The International Music Festival ‘Chopin and his Europe’ as well as the role of Hunding in a concert performance of Die Walküre at Polish National Opera alongside Placido Domingo as Siegmund.

His first Wagner role in a stage performance was King Marke (Tristan und Isolde) in Rome in 2006.

In 2007, Siwek began his cooperation with the conductor Lorin Maazel. This resulted in their concert performances of Beethoven’s Symphony no. 9 in the Vatican, Milan, Brussels (European Parliament), Accademia Nazionale di Santa Cecilia and Auditorium Conciliazione in Rome as well as Verdi’s Requiem in St. Mark’s Basilica in Venice, Milan, Cassablanca, Busseto, Assisi and Jerusalem. Maazel also conducted operas in which Siwek sang bass parts – Aida in Sao Paulo (Ramfis) and Luisa Miller in Valencia (Wurm).

In 2011, Siwek made his La Scala debut as Sarastro. He also performed at Staatsoper Unter den Linden in Berlin (Grand Inquisitor in Don Carlo) and Bayerische Staatsoper in Munich (Timus in Turandot and Ramfis in Aida). He sang the part of Ramfis also at Terme di Caracalla in Rome. At Polish National Opera, Siwek appeared as Zaccaria in Nabucco, Narbal in Les Troyens (cond. by Valery Gergiev) and Raimondo in Lucia di Lammermoor.

In 2012, Siwek returned to Bayerische Staatsoper in Munich to sing Wurm in Luisa Miller and Fafner in Siegfried (cond. by Kent Nagano). He sang Galitsky at the season opening performance of Prince Igor at Staatsoper in Hamburg and Commandore at Deutsche Oper in Berlin during the Festival Castell de Peralada.

Siwek began season 2013, the year of Verdi, with Philip II in Don Carlo and Zaccaria in Nabucco at Polish National Opera. He returned to La Scala as Grand Inquisitor and to Bayerische Staatsoper as Sparafucile. He also made his debut at Opernhaus in Zurich as Il Commendatore (cond. by Fabio Luisi) and appeared at Bolshoi Theatre as Philip II in Don Carlo.

In 2014, he again sang at Bayerische Staatsoper (Gremin, cond. by Kirill Petrenko; Sparafucile, cond. by Marco Armiliato) and in Zurich (Ramfis in a new production of Aida). Together with Polish National Opera he made a guest performance in Tokio. He also sang Timur at Teatro Lirico in Calgari and Arena di Verona. He sang the title role in a concert performance of Verdi’s Attila at Polish National Opera. The next year witnessed his performances in Halka (Stolnik) at Polish National Theatre, in Der fliegende Holländer (Daland) at National Theatre in Tokio and in Nabucco (Zaccaria) at New Israeli Opera in Tel Aviv.

In 2016, he added the title part of Boris Godunov to his repertoire, which he sang at Grant Theatre in Poznań. He also appeared as Raimondo in Lucia di Lammermoor at Paris Opera.

In 2017, Siwek sang Heinrich in Lohengrin at Paris Opera, Fiesco in Simon Boccanegra in Concertgebouw, as well as Galitsky in Prince Igor and Tsar Ivan the Terrible in The Maid of Pskov at Bolshoi Theatre in Moscow.

In 2018 he appeared, among others, in Aida in Teatro Real in Madrid as well as Nabucco and Aida in Arena di Verona. In the opening performance of 243rd artistic season in Bolshoi Theatre he had his debut as Boris in Boris Godunov. He also recorded Moniuszko’s operas.

In the next year, together with Placido Domingo, Siwek was one of the performers at Verdi Gala in Paris Philharmonic and sang Zaccaria in Nabucco in Bayerische Staatsoper in Munich. He took part in the performance of Mahler’s “Symphony of a Thousand” at Maggio Musicale Fiorentino, which was conducted by Fabio Luisi. He appeared in Opera Bastille in Paris, where he sang Padre Guardiano in La forza del destino, as well as Teatro Real in Madrid and Greek National Opera in Athens, where he performed the role of Grand Inquisitor in Don Carlo.

n the 2020-21 season, during the pandemic, he sang in Poland among others Philip in the concert performance of Don Carlos at the Grand Theatre in Łódź (together with Aleksandra Kurzak, Roberto Alagna and Andrzej Dobber) and at the Arena di Verona Festival he created Zaccaria in Nabucco and Ramfis in Aida.

The artist began the 2021-22 season with a performance in the title role in Boris Godunov at the Bolshoi Theatre in Moscow. At the Amsterdam Opera, he appeared as the Commendatore in Don Giovanni, and in Munich as Timur in Turandot. He created King Mark in Tristan and Isolde in Bari, Fiesca in Simone Boccanegra in Palermo and in Bologna he appeared in a concert performance of Tchaikovsky's Jolanta as René. He concluded the season with performances in the part of Zaccaria in Nabucco at the Teatro Colón in Buenos Aires and in Verona.

2022-23 season: Munich and Berlin - as the Grand Inquisitor, Vodnik in Dvořák's Rusalka at the Semperoper and in ROH in London; Sarastro in Die zauberflöte in Teatro Colon, Father Guardian in La forza del destino in Bologna. Siwek also appeared in nine performances (Aida and Nabucco) at the 100th anniversary Arena di Verona Festival.

== Repertoire ==
Rafał Siwek mainly performs major dramatic bass roles by Verdi, Wagner and Russian composers. His repertoire includes numerous parts in Verdi’s operas: Philip II and Grand Inquisitor (Don Carlo), Attila (Attila), Zaccaria (Nabucco), Wurm (Luisa Miller), Il Padre Guardiano (La forza del destino), Silva (Ernani), Ferrando (Il trovatore), Fiesco (Simon Boccanegra), and Massimiliano (I masnadieri); Wagner’s operas: Daland (Der fliegende Holländer), Heinrich (Lohengrin), King Marke (Tristan und Isolde) and Russian operas: Boris Godunov (Boris Godunov), Galitsky and Konchak in Prince Igor, and Tsar Ivan the Terrible in The Maid of Pskov.

== Artistic work ==
Rafał Siwek regularly appears at the most prestigious opera houses such as Bayerische Staatsoper in Munich, Opernhaus in Zurich, Staatsoper Unter den Linden in Berlin, Staatsoper in Hamburg, Teatro Real in Madrid, Bolshoi Theatre in Moscow, Mariinsky Theatre in St Petersburg, Royal Theatre in Brussels, New Israeli Opera in Tel Aviv and National Theatre in Tokio. In Italy, he performed at Teatro alla Scala in Milan, Teatro dell’Opera di Roma, Teatro Communale in Bologna, Teatro Regio in Turin, Teatro del Maggio Musicale in Florence, Teatro Regio in Parma as well as during the festivals at Arena di Verona, Terme di Caracalla and Torre del Lago.

He has sung at many famed European theatres and festivals, including Concertgebouw in Amsterdam, Theatre du Chatelet in Paris, Beethovenfest in Bonn, Royal Theatre and Palais des Beaux Arts in Brussels, Accademia di Santa Cecilia in Rome, Opéra de Lille, Grand Théâtre de Luxembourg, Savonlinna Festival, and others.

He has performed oratorio works with Radio France Philharmonic Orchestra, Netherlands Radio Symphony Orchestra, Filarmonica Arturo Toscanini, Orchestra of the Eighteenth Century and the major Polish orchestras.

He has sung with many acclaimed opera singers (e.g. Placido Domingo, José Cura, José van Dam, Juan Pons, Leo Nucci, Marcelo Alvarez) and conductors (e.g. Zubin Mehta, Lorin Maazel, Semyon Bychkov, Daniel Oren, Gianluigi Gelmetti, Krzysztof Penderecki, Helmuth Rilling, Alberto Zedda, Fabio Luisi, Walerij Giergijew, Kent Nagano, Roberto Abbado, Kiril Petrenko, and Marco Armiliato). He took part in stagings by Franco Zeffirelli, Pierluigi Pier’Alli, Willy Decker, Jonathan Miller, David McVicar, Mariusz Treliński, Hugo de Ana, and Adrian Noble.

His concert performances include Verdi’s Requiem (Milan, Venice, Casablanca, Jerusalem, cond. by Lorin Maazel), Beethoven’s Symphony no. 9 (Rome, Milan, Brussels, Taormin), Rossini’s Stabat Mater (Verona), Janáček’s Glagolitic Mass (Praha, Bonn, Bratislava, Brno, Linz). Siwek has appeared many times at Warsaw Philharmonic singing Verdi’s Requiem, Dvořák’s Stabat Mater, Beethoven’s Missa Solemnis, Rossini’s Petite Messe Solennelle, Mozart’s Requiem and Coronation mass (cond. by Frans Brüggen), Bach’s Mass in B minor (cond. by Helmuth Rilling). In Riga, he sang in Penderecki’s Credo, the performance conducted by the composer.

== Recordings ==
- L. v. Beethoven, IX Symfonie, Maria Luigia Borsi, Birgit Remmert, Vale Rideout, Rafal Siwek, Coro del Maggio Musicale Fiorentino, Orchestra Symphonica Toscanini, cond. Lorin Maazel, Vatican, KULTUR (2007);
- V. Bellini, Norma, Daniela Dessì (Norma), Fabio Armiliato (Pollione), Kate Aldrich (Adalgisa), Rafal Siwek (Oroveso), Antonello Ceron (Flavio), Marie Luce Erard (Clotilde), Coro e Orchestra del Teatro Comunale di Bologna, cond. Evelino Pidò, Hardy Classics, HCD4034
- W. Kilar, Missa Pro Pace, Joanna Woś, Małgorzata Walewska, Paweł Brożek, Rafał Siwek, Chór Opery i Filharmonii Podlaskiej w Białymstoku, cond. Mirosław Jacek Błaszczyk, DUX 1413;
- S. Moniuszko, The Haunted Manor, Tomasz Konieczny (The Sword-bearer), Edyta Piasecka (Hanna), Monika Ledzion-Porczyńska (Jadwiga), Arnold Rutkowski (Stefan), Mariusz Godlewski (Zbigniew), Marcin Bronikowski (Maciej), Małgorzata Walewska (Cześnikowa), Rafał Siwek (Skołuba); XVIII Century Orchestra, Podlaskie Opera Choir, cond. Grzegorz Nowak, NIFCCD 084-085
- F. Nowowiejski, Quo Vadis, Aleksandra Kurzak, Artur Ruciński, Rafał Siwek, Sebastian Szumski, Arkadiusz Bialic (organy), cond. Piotr Sułkowski, Górecki Chamber Choir, Orkiestra Symfoniczna Warmińsko-Mazurskiej Filharmonii im. Feliksa Nowowiejskiego w Olsztynie, DUX 1327/1328;
- K. Penderecki, Ubu Rex; Paweł Wunder (Ojciec Ubu), Anna Lubańska (Ubica), Józef Frakstein (Król Wacław), Izabela Kłosińska (Królowa Rozamunda), Anna Karasińska (Bolesław), Jeanette Bożałek (Władysław), Rafał Bartmiński (Byczysław), Mieczysław Milun (Car), Rafał Siwek (Car), Piotr Nowacki (Baridor), Robert Dymowski (Generał Lascy), Andrzej Witlewski (chłop), Magdalena Andreew-Siwek (Pila), Chór i Orkiestra Teatru Wielkiego - Opery Narodowej w Warszawie, cond. Jacek Kaspszyk, CD Accord, ACD 133
- G. Puccini, Edgar, Placido Domingo (Edgar), Adriana Damato (Fidelia), Marianne Cornetti (Tigrana), Juan Pons (Frank), Rafael Siwek (Gualtiero), cond. Alberto Veronesi, Chorus and Orchestra of Academia Nazionale di Santa Cecilia, rec. Santa Cecilia, 22 June 2005, DEUTSCHE GRAMMOPHON 00289 477 6102 GH2;
- G. Verdi, Luiza Miller, Francesca Franci, Marcelo Alvarez, Giorgio Surian, Rafal Siwek, cond. Donato Renzetti, Parma Teatro Regio Orchestra, Parma Teatro Regio Chorus, C Major 722808;
- G. Verdi, Nabucco, George Gagnidze (Nabucco), Rubens Pelizzari (Ismaele), Rafał Siwek (Zaccaria), Susanna Branchini (Abigaille), Nino Surguladze (Fenena), Nicolò Ceriani (Il Gran Sacerdote di Belo), Paolo Antognetti (Abdallo), Elena Borin (Anna), Arena of Verona Choir, Daniel Oren (conductor), Arnaud Bernard (stage director and costume designer), Alessandro Camera (set designer), Paolo Mazzon (lighting designer), Arena di Verona, August 2017 (live), Bel Air Classiques, No: BAC448 (DVD)
- G. Verdi, Requiem, Fiorenza Cedolins, Luciana D'Intino, Ramón Vargas, Rafał Siwek, Coro della Fondazione Arturo Toscanini, Orchestra Filarmonica Arturo Toscanini, dyr. Zubin Mehta, Roma, 30 January 2005, TDK, B000M2EBXI (DVD)
- G. Verdi, Requiem, Norma Fantini, Anna Smirnova, Francesco Meli, Rafal Siwek, cond. Lorin Maazel, Florence Maggio Musicale Chorus, Symphonica Toscanini, 2007 (DVD)
- G. Verdi, Rigoletto, Quinn Kelsey (Rigoletto), Michael Fabiano (Il Duca di Mantova), Olga Peretyatko (Gilda), Rafal Siwek (Sparafucile), Vesselina Kasarova (Maddalena), cond. Nicola Luisotti, director: Claus Guth, set design: Christian Schmidt, Paris, 23 kwietnia 2016, (DVD), SKU, PODV306
- G. Verdi, Il trovatore, B. Kubiak, M. Dawydow, B. Szynalski, E. Kaczmarzyk-Janczak, R. Siwek (Ferrando); Wroclaw Opera, cond. E. Michnik, DUX 0186;
