= Lilly Walleni =

Swedish music artist (1882–1920)

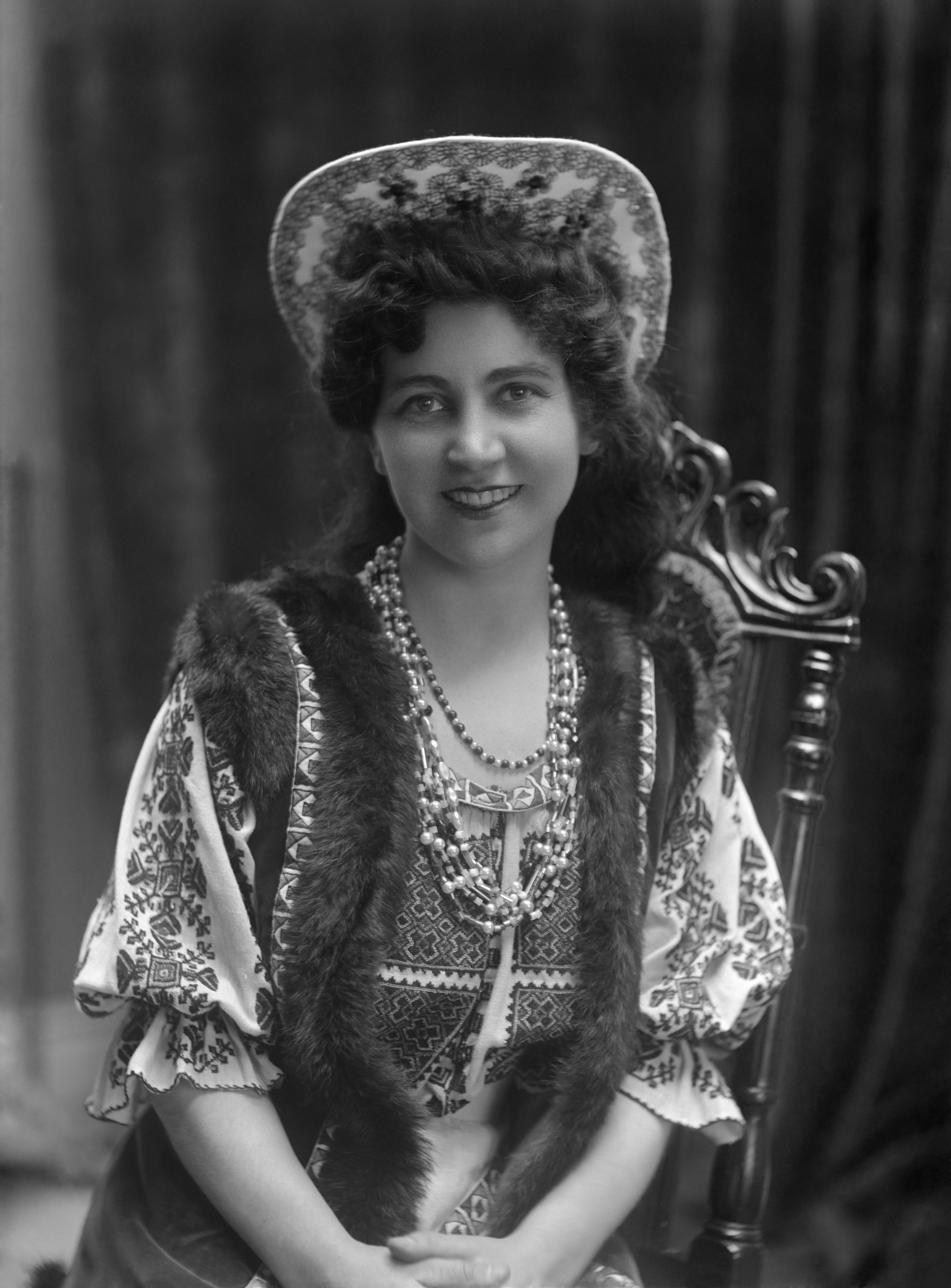
- Walleni as Daria at the Royal Swedish Opera in 1907
- Born: Sanna Klara Vallentin; 11 August 1875; Malmö, Sweden
- Died: 14 May 1920 (aged 44); Stockholm, Sweden
- Education: Music College of Boston
- Occupation: Operatic soprano
- Organizations: Court Opera in Hannover; Royal Swedish Opera
- Title: Hovsångerska
- Awards: Lippe awards

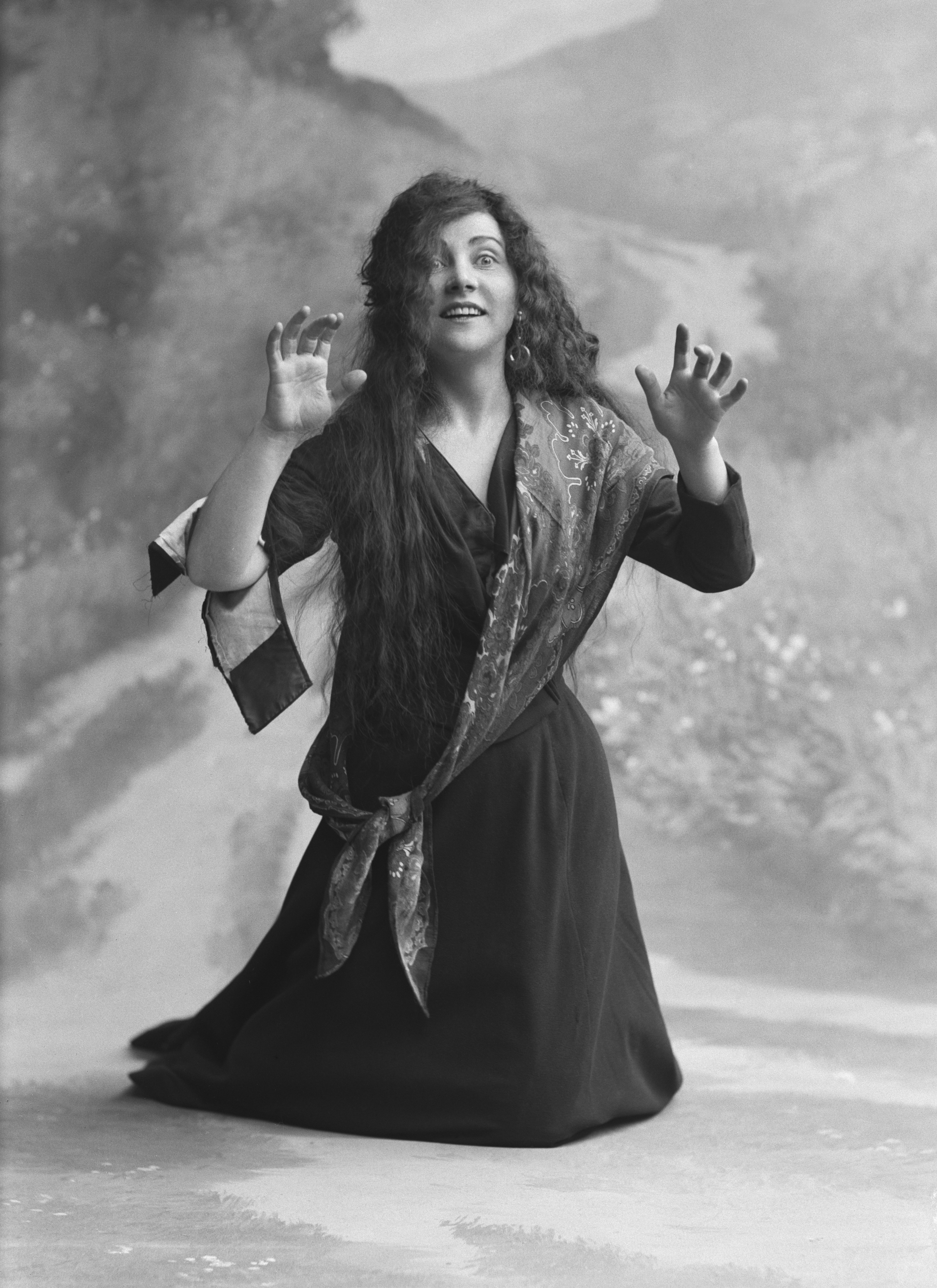
Walleni in the role of Anita in the opera La Navarraise at the Royal Swedish Opera in 1906

Sanna Klara Vallentin (11 August 1875 – 14 May 1920), known by her stage name Lilly Walleni, was a Swedish mezzo-soprano. Thanks to her powerful voice and her dramatic temperament, she is remembered in particular for the Wagner roles she performed in Germany's principal opera houses as well as at the Royal Swedish Opera in Stockholm. From 1911 to 1916, she was engaged by the Court Opera in Hannover where she was honoured with two Lippe awards.

== Early life ==
Born on 11 August 1875 in Malmö, Sanna Klara Vallentin spent 16 years in the United States while still young, studying at the Music College of Boston. On returning to Sweden in 1902, she was engaged at Albert Ranft's operetta centre in Stockholm until 1905, after which she was with the Royal Swedish Opera until 1908. She completed her education with a year's study in Berlin.

== Career ==
From 1910, she was engaged by the Court Opera in Hannover, and also appeared as a guest at principal opera houses in Germany, including Dresden and Hamburg. From 1917 to 1919, she performed at the Stockholm Opera. From 1909 to 1917, after being one of his most successful pupils, she was married to the Swedish tenor Nisse Strandberg.

Thanks to her wide-ranging voice and her effective acting abilities, she was given several major Wagnerian roles. These included Elsa in Lohengrin, Elisabeth in Tannhäuser, Kundry in Parsifal and Sieglinde and Brünnhilde in Die Walküre. She also performed the title roles in Puccini's Tosca and Verdi's Aida.

Lilly Walleni died in Stockholm on 14 May 1920.

== Awards ==
Walleni was honoured with awards from the principalities of Lippe and Schaumburg-Lippe. The Rose for Culture (Lippische Rose für Kunst) was awarded to Walleni on 19 February 1914 at a concert in Schloss Detmold in honour of Leopold IV, Prince of Lippe. On 12 December 1913, she had already been awarded a Second Class Schaumburg-Lippe medal for Culture and Science and had been given the title Princely Lippe Opera Singer (Fürstlich Lippische Opernsängerin).
