= Palau de la Música de València =

Coordinates: 39°27′58″N 0°21′37″W

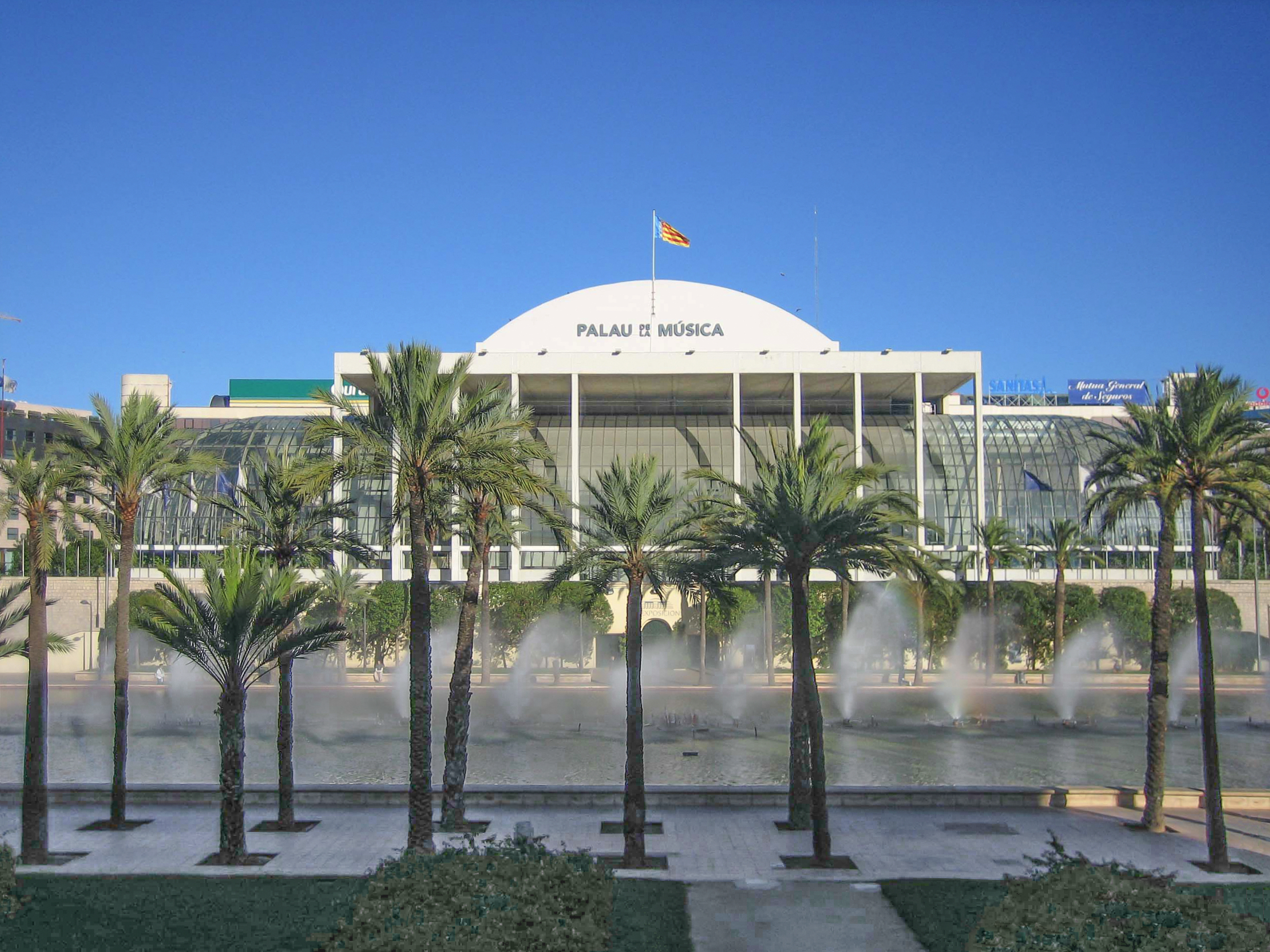
Palau de la Música

The Palau de la Música de València is a concert, cinema, arts, and exhibition hall in Valencia situated on the Túria river.

It is the home of the city's municipal orchestra, the Orchestra of Valencia founded 1943. (not to be confused with the Orquestra de la Comunitat Valenciana founded 2006).
