= Joanna Woś =

Polish operatic coloratura soprano

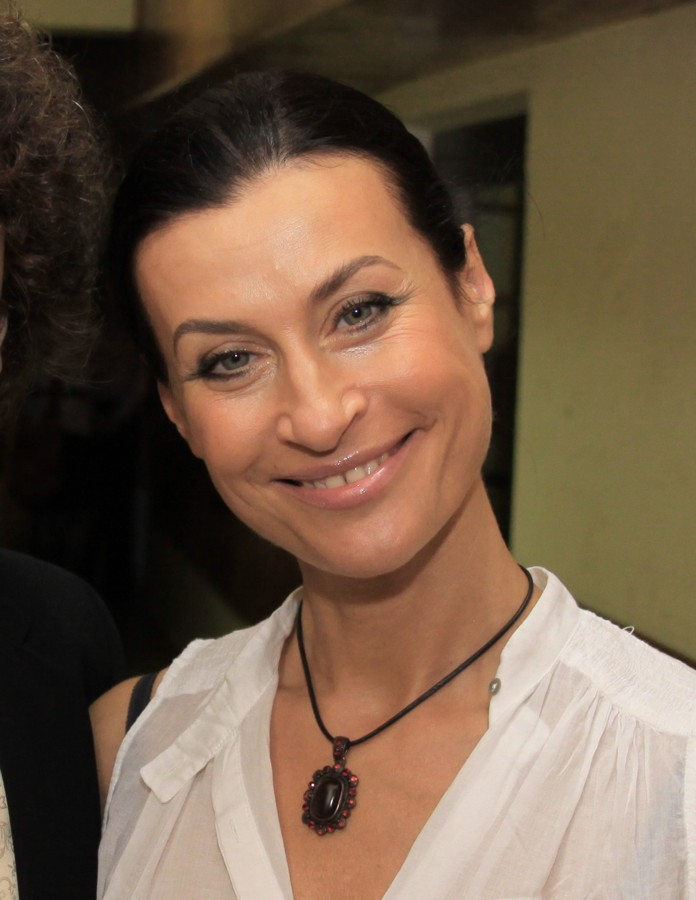
- Born: 1991 (age 34–35); Kielce, Polish People's Republic
- Education: Academy of Music in Łódź
- Occupation: Operatic soprano
- Years active: 1986–present
- Website: www.joannawos.com

Joanna Woś is a Polish operatic coloratura soprano who made an international career on stage and in concert.

== Life and career ==
Woś graduated from the Academy of Music in Łódź. She made her debut on the stage of the Grand Theatre in Łódź with the title role of Donizetti's Lucia di Lammermoor. She has a sonorous voice with a wide range, ranging to high F6. She is laureate of major vocal competitions in Poland, such as a prize at the 1989 International Vocal Competition in Bilbao, and was awarded the Golden Mask music critics awards several times.

Woś has performed with the Polish National Opera, the Cracow Opera, the Grand Theatre in Poznań, the National Philharmonic and the Cracow Philharmonic. She has appeared in guest performances at Alte Oper in Frankfurt, Deutsche Oper Berlin, Parco della Musica in Rome, the Galina Vishnevskaya Opera Centre in Moscow, the National Opera in Vilnius, and the National Opera in Zagreb, and on other opera and concert stages in Europe, the US and Russia. In April 2010 she recorded for the BBC, Gorecki's Symphony No. 3 with the London Symphony Orchestra conducted by Marin Alsop at the Royal Festival Hall in London. In 2013 the Grand Theatre in Lodz staged especially for her Donizetti's Anna Bolena.

She became an honorary citizen of Łódź in 2017.

== Performances ==
=== Roles ===
- The Magic Flute as The Queen of the Night
- Lucia di Lammermoor (title role)
- Rigoletto as Gilda
- Maria Stuarda (title role)
- La traviata (title role)
- Don Giovanni as Donna Anna
- I puritani as Elvira
- Don Pasquale as Norina
- The Barber of Seville as Rosina
- Lucrezia Borgia (title role)
- Anna Bolena (title role)
- Orfeo ed Euridice (title role)
- La rondine (title role)
- Così fan tutte as Fiordiligi
- The Tales of Hoffmann as Olympia
- Un ballo in maschera as Oscar
- The Marriage of Figaro
- I Capuleti e i Montecchi as Giulietta
- Falstaff as Nannetta
- The Golden Cockerel as Queen of Shemakha
- Life with an Idiot as Wife
- The Haunted Manor as Hanna
- L'elisir d'amore as Adina
- La bohème as Musetta
- La voix humaine as She
- La Bohème as Musetta
- A Streetcar Named Desire as Blanche DuBois
- Madame Butterfly (title role)
- Norma (opera) (title role)

=== Concerts ===
Woś performed in concert works such as Pergolesi's Stabat Mater, Rossini's Stabat Mater and Szymanowski's Stabat Mater, Gounod's St. Cecilia Mass, Fauré's Requiem, Mozart's Exsultate, jubilate and Orff's Carmina Burana.

== Discography ==
- 2016: Opera Arias – Poniatowski CD
- 2016: Joanna Woś śpiewa/sings CD
- 2016: Hearkening to the universe CD
