= Requiem (Donizetti) =

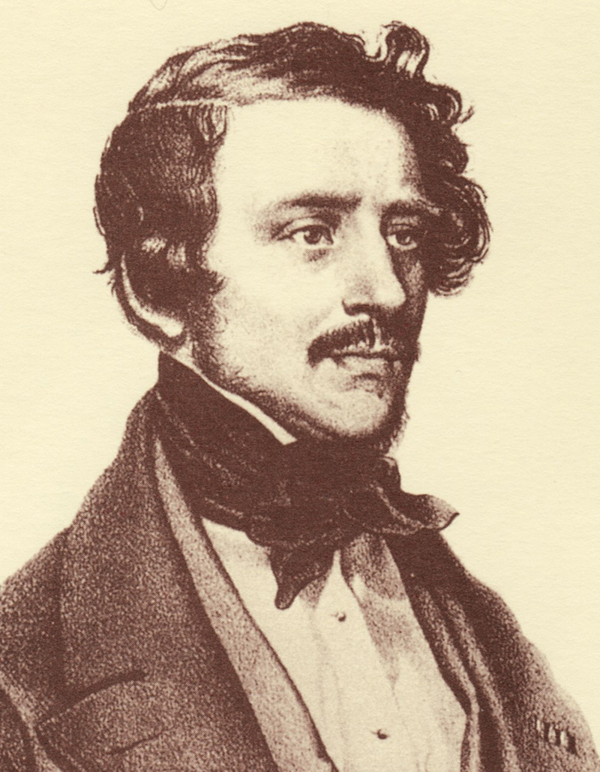
Gaetano Donizetti, from a lithography by Josef Kriehuber (1842)

The Messa da requiem in D minor (1835) is a musical setting of the Catholic funeral mass (Requiem) by Italian opera composer Gaetano Donizetti. It is scored for five soloists (SATB and a baritone), mixed chorus and orchestra. A performance lasts about 62–75 minutes.

== History ==
Began in October 1835 to commemorate the death of Donizetti's friend and rival Vincenzo Bellini in Naples, the work was left unfinished (probably due to composer unable to conduct it in December, because he was not in the city). It was published in 1870 by Lucca in a vocal with organ arrangement. The first known performance took place the same year in Donizetti's native Bergamo, in the basilica of Santa Maria Maggiore, under Alessandro Nini. It was repeated in 1875 on the occasion of the translation of the remains of Donizetti and his teacher Simon Mayr to Santa Maria Maggiore; then on the centenary of Donizetti's birth (1897) and death (1948, under Gianandrea Gavazzeni).

The manuscript is preserved in the Conservatorio di San Pietro a Majella (Naples). In 1974 Vilmos Leskó prepared a new Ricordi edition of the Requiem, and since then it came to be regarded as one of the most important non-operatic compositions by Donizetti. It could also have influenced Giuseppe Verdi in his own Requiem (1873–1874), if he was acquainted with it.

The Requiem for Bellini is one of four Requiem settings by Donizetti, but the only one to survive to the present day. Among the others were a Requiem for Niccolò Zingarelli (composed 1837 in 3 days) and a Requiem for Lorenzo Fazzini (performed in San Ferdinando, Naples, 7 November 1837).

Donizetti's Requiem was performed at the Piazzale del Cimitero monumentale in Bergamo on 28 June 2020, to commemorate the victims of the coronavirus pandemic.

== Orchestration ==
- Soloists: soprano, alto, tenor, 2 basses (or baritone and bass)
- Chorus: SATB
- Orchestra: 2 flutes, 2 oboes, 2 clarinets, 2 bassoons, 4 French horns, 2 trumpets, 3 trombones, timpani, strings, organ

== Structure ==
For his setting Donizetti used the traditional Latin Requiem text. The opening Requiem aeternam section is preceded by an orchestral introduction, of which the orchestration is lost. A gradual (In memoria aeterna) follows. While Donizetti completed the Sequentia and Offertorium, there is no trace of Sanctus, Benedictus and Agnus Dei, which are thought to be never composed. The work concludes with the Lux aeterna and Libera me.

1. Introduzione (41 measures of orchestral introduction and 143 measures). Requiem aeternam — Te decet — Requiem aeternam — Kyrie
2. Graduale (97 measures). Requiem aeternam — In memoria aeterna
3. Sequentia (910 measures). Dies irae — Tuba mirum — Judex ergo — Rex tremendae — Ingemisco — Praeces meae — Confutatis — Oro supplex — Lacrymosa [sic]
4. Offertorium (97 measures). Domine Jesu Christe
5. Communio (37 measures). Lux aeterna
6. Responsorium (182 measures). Libera me — Tremens factus — Quando coeli — Dies irae and Dum veneris — Requiem aeternam — Libera me — Kyrie

== Editions ==
- Gaetano Donizetti. Messa di requiem: composed in memory of Vincenzo Bellini (1835). Published under the auspices of the Donizetti Society, London, by Egret House, 1974
- Gaetano Donizetti. Messa di Requiem for Soprano, Contralto, Tenor, 2 Bass Soloists, Four-part mixed Chorus and Orchestra. Latin & English texts. Piano-Vocal score, Edited by Vilmos Leskó. Milano: Casa Ricordi, 1997 (plate number 131956)

== Recordings ==
- (1979/1980) Donizetti. Requiem — Viorica Cortez, Luciano Pavarotti, Renato Bruson, Paolo Washington; Orchestra e coro Ente Lirico Arena di Verona (chorus master Corrado Mirandola); conductor Gerhard Fackler — DECCA: LP (1980), CD (1992): 425 043-2
- (1984/1988)Gaetano Donizetti. Messa di requiem — Cheryl Studer, Helga Müller-Molinari, Aldo Baldin, Jan-Hendrik Rootering, John-Paul Bogart; Chor der Bamberger Symphoniker; Bamberger Symphoniker; conductor Miguel Ángel Gómez Martínez — Orfeo C 172 881 A
- (1997/1998) Gaetano Donizetti. Messa da requiem — Tiziana K. Sojat, Jaroslava Maxová, Vittorio Giammarrusco, Zdeněk Hlávka, Marcel Rosca; Prague Chamber Choir; Virtuosi di Praga; conductor Alexander Rahbari — Koch Discover International DICD 920519 (reissued 2007: Profil PH08026)

== Sources ==
- William Ashbrook (1983). Donizetti and His Operas. Cambridge University Press. pp. 100–101, 724. ISBN 978-0-521-27663-4.
- Guido Johannes Joerg (2026), Gaetano Donizettis Messa di Requiem (1835) – Entstehung, Geschick und Rezeption eines dringend wiederzuentdeckenden Meisterwerks. – Hamburg 2026. – 101 p. (odiug noitide 005), ISBN 978-3-6951-9024-9. (Detailed study by the editor of the new Urtext edition of the Requiem (2023) by Carus-Verlag, Stuttgart, Germany.)
- Gearge Hall. Booklet notes to DECCA 425 043-2
- Gottfried Kraus. Booklet notes to Orfeo C 172 881 A
- Wolfgang Teubner. Booklet notes to Profil PH08026
