= Yaron Traub =

Israeli conductor and pianist

Yaron Traub (Hebrew: ירון טראוב; born 1964) is an Israeli conductor and pianist. He was born in Tel Aviv.

Traub was Music Director and Chief Conductor of the Valencia Orchestra from 2005 to 2017. Throughout the 1990s he served as Daniel Barenboim's assistant at the Bayreuth Festival and the Chicago Symphony Orchestra. Since winning the 1998 Orchestral Prize at the IV Kondrashin International Conducting Competition in Amsterdam, Traub has conducted numerous symphonic orchestras worldwide.

Yaron Traub is the son of Chaim Taub, former concertmaster of the Israel Philharmonic Orchestra.

Orchestra	Position	Preceded by...	App.	Left	Succeeded by...
Chicago Symphony Orchestra	Assistant Conductor		1995	1998	
	Associate Conductor		1998	1999	
The Israel Sinfonietta Beersheba	Principal Conductor, Artistic Director		2002	2005	
Orquesta de Valencia	Principal Conductor, Artistic Director		2005	2017	
