= Artur Ruciński =

Polish operatic baritone singer (born 1976)

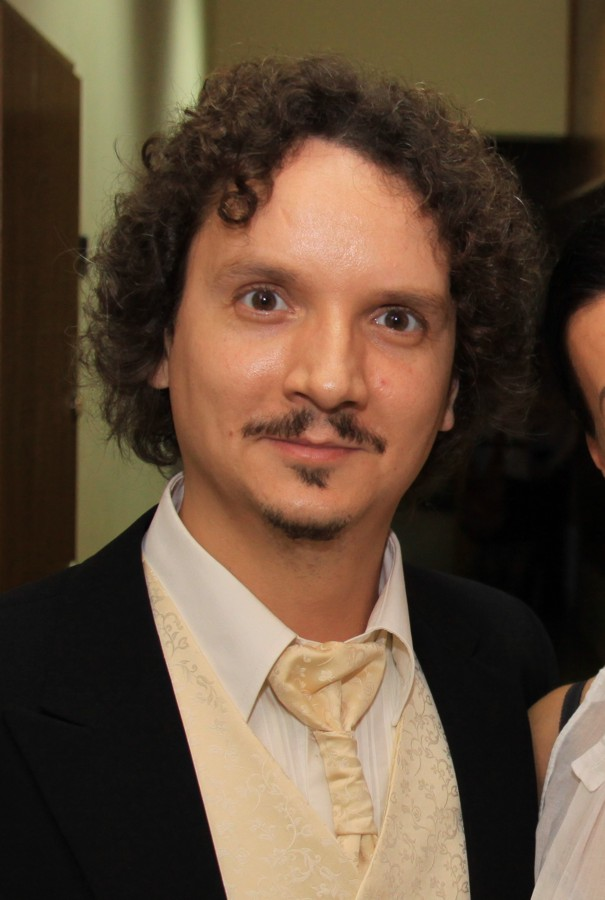
- Born: 1976 (age 49–50); Warsaw, Poland
- Education: Warsaw Academy of Music
- Occupation: Baritone singer
- Years active: 2002 - present
- Website: arturrucinski.com

Artur Ruciński (born 1976) is a Polish operatic baritone singer.

== Biography ==
Ruciński studied at the Warsaw Academy of Music and made his debut as Papageno in The Magic Flute with Warsaw Chamber Opera in 2001. In 2002 he made his debut at Warsaw's National Theatre, taking the title role in Eugene Onegin. He went on to sing Onegin with the Berlin State Opera, and Enrico in Lucia di Lammermoor for Hamburg State Opera.

Other roles have included Figaro in The Barber of Seville, Prince Yeletsky in The Queen of Spades, Marcello in La bohème, Riccardo in I puritani and Valentin in Faust.

In the 2011-12 season Ruciński was scheduled to sing Marcello in La bohème, the Count in The Marriage of Figaro and Germont in La traviata. In January 2012 he made his UK debut, giving a recital of opera arias and Tadeusz Baird's Four Love Sonnets, settings of Polish translations from Shakespeare, at London's St John's, Smith Square. In May 2012 he made his American debut as Marcello with LA Opera. He appears on a DVD live recording of Verdi's I masnadieri released in January 2013.

Artur Ruciński made his debut at the Metropolitan Opera as Sharpless in Madama Butterfly in 2016, and returned there in the roles of Germont in La Traviata and Lescaut in Manon in 2019.
