= Manuel Palau =

Spanish composer and teacher

Manuel Palau Boix (4 January 1893 – 18 February 1967) was a Spanish composer and teacher in Valencia Conservatory. He wrote a large number of symphonic, band (wind orchestra), choral and chamber works. He was one of the most popular and important composers of his time. He received the Spanish National Music Award (Premio Nacional de Música) twice, first in 1927 and again in 1945. His music is known within the Spanish classical music for being a representative of what it has been called “Mediterranean” style, like other Spanish musicians such as Vicente Asencio or Oscar Esplá.

The cities of Valencia, Alfara del Patriarca, Llíria, Alaquàs and Xirivella named streets after him. There is a Spanish choir called Manuel Palau in his honor.

== Biography ==
Palau lived some of the sweetest and most bitter moments of art in Spain. He had the good fortune to be a contemporary of a large number of artists (painters, poets, musicians) and scientists who had achieved international significance. However, he also had the misfortune of living through the horrendous events of the military insurrection against the legitimate government of the country and suffered the post-war horrors that severely impeded artistic production. But the Valencian musician composed until the end of his days, motivated by the satisfaction that his own creative activity gave him.

Born in Alfara del Patriarca (Valencia) on 4 January 1893, he started his musical education at the Conservatory of Music in Valencia. He studied composition with Charles Koechlin and Ravel and many of his compositions are influenced by the impressionism.

In 1927 and 1945 he won the Premio Nacional de Música (Spanish National Music Award).

He was a teacher in the Conservatory of Valencia and became principal in 1951. Among his students there are international musicians such the conductor Manuel Galduf, the professor Salvador Seguí, etc.

Manuel Palau Boix died in Valencia on 18 February 1967.

== Style ==
Palau looked into the French musical mirror, where he found some of his more important musical influences. The artistic currents that coexisted at that moment influenced his music to a greater or lesser degree. A review of some of those styles, Palau’s sources of inspiration, bring us closer to the European musical environment of that time. But, without doubt, one of the elements that marked his music in a definite way, was to be Valencian folklore. Originally from a small village in the Valencian countryside (Alfara del Patriarca), the music that he heard sung at parties, weddings, etc., were to become his constant inspiration. Sometimes, he recreates a given popular themes, other times he invented melodies himself in the style of folk music, giving his compositions a peculiarity that differentiates his music from other Spanish music of the time (that often looked to the South of Spain for its inspiration) that had become popular towards the end of the 19th century.

Manuel Palau looks for the Valencian’s colour: at a time in which Andalusian regionalism was dominant, the maestro sought inspiration in his own cultural roots.

== Recordings ==
Orchestras as the ONE (National Orchestra of Spain), ORTVE (Spanish Radio TV Orchestra) Joven Orquesta de la Generalitat Valenciana, have recorded his music, including soloists such Narciso Yepes, Bertomeu Jaume, Rafael Serrallet and Manuel Galduf, etc.

== Legacy ==
In 2013 Palau’s heirs donated their musical material to the Valencian Library and IVM (Valencian Musical Institute). 3.069 books and scores from his personal library, 196 recordings, 109 publications, and 1.242 documents from his personal archive (840 manuscripts of his works).

== Works ==
Despite his prolific musical production, Manuel Palau is relatively unknown in the music world. Palau left a very interesting collection of music, including guitar works and, additionally, he wrote a substantial concerto that is almost forgotten today and has been barely performed since his composition.

Manuel Palau wrote more than hundred Lieder, one guitar concerto (Concert of Valencia or Concierto Levantino), two piano concerti, three symphonies, choral music, ballet, the opera Maror.

Here a list of works.

Orchestra

   1919 Coplas de mi tierra (There is also a wind orchestra version)
   1920 Escenes i paisatges valencians
       Adagietto
       Dansa
   1921 Tres danses valencianes
       Dansa dels xiquets
       Dansa de la colla antiga
       Dansa de la colla muntanyenca
   1924 Danza morisca
   1924 Tres impresiones orquestales
       Andantino
       Non tropo lento
       Alla marcia
   1927 Siluetes - Suite (There is also a wind orchestra version)
       Dolçainers
       Llauradors
       ...i els xiquet passen
   1928 Gongoriana (There is also a wind orchestra version)
       Noel
       Celosa está la niña
       Humoresca
       Ecaristica
       En el baile del agido
       Glorioso parta Don Juan
   1929 Cançó de bressol (Lullaby) for voice and string orchestra
   1929 Homenaje a Debussy
   1930 Muntanyesa
   1932 Four preludes for string orchestra
   1933 Obertura española
   1934 El ball de la falla for voice and orchestra
   1935 La copla del inclusero for choir and orchestra
   1935 Poemes de llum
       Crepuscular
       Nocturnal
       Matinada
   1935 València per a piano i orquestra
   1936 Marxa burlesca (originally composed for the Valencian saxophones ensemble "Filarmonia")
   1936 Documental valenciana
       Allegro non tanto
       Andante
       Vivo
   1937 Divertimento
       Obertura
       Siciliana
       Rigodón
       Pavana
       Giga
   1938 O quam suavis for baritone,  male choir and string orchestra
   1939/1949 Mascarada sarcástica
   1940 Simfonia núm 1 in e-mino
       Allegro deciso
       Largo. Andante cantabile
       Animato. Scherzo
       Allegro. Finale
   1942 Salve for choir and orchestra
   1944 Simfonia núm. 2 en re major - Murciana
       Largo. Allegro energico
       Lento. Tiempo de parranda. Lentamente
       Presto
       Allegro giocoso
   1946 Dramatic Concerto for piano and orchestra
       Lento. Allegro non tanto
       Lentamente
       Allegro deciso
   1947/1959 Concert of Valencia (Concierto Levantino) for guitar and orchestra
       Allegro non tanto. Allegro deciso
       Larghetto. Animado. Larghetto
       Presto
   1950 Simfonia number 3
   1950 Salmantinas for female choir and orchestra.
   1951/1955 Escena y danza de Omar
   1953 Two aquarelles for string orchestra
   1956 Tríptico catedralicio (There is also a wind orchestra version)
   1963 Heráldica
   Anthem for nuevo al Santísimo Cristo Verdadero for choir and orchestra.
   Criatura dolcíssima for voice and orchestra. Texts by  Joan Fuster
   Suite in old stile

Wind orchestra (Banda de música)

   1920 Himne a la bandera for choir and wind orchestra.
   1921 Marxa valenciana n. 2
   1922 Himne a Bétera for choir and wind orchestra.
   1922 La cançó del poble
   1923 Marxa valenciana n. 4
   1923 Pasodoble andaluz
   1924 Penya truquera
   1924 ¡Vaya lo fino!
   1924 Danza mora
   1925 Soc de Moncà
   1925 Poemas de juventud
   1929 Marcha n. 13
   1930 Cançó de renaixença for choir and banda.
   1936 Two school songs for children's choir and wind orchestra. 
   1946 Manises Anthem
   1947 Blayo
   1956 Marcha solemne
   1961 Riberas del Jiloca
   1961 Rumores del Genil
   Himne escolar for choir and wind orchestra

Theatre

   1917 Farandulerías
   1918 Beniflors, Valencian zarzuela in one act
   1920 Amor torna, Dramatic  Valencian zarzuela in 2 acts 
   1922 A vora mar Valencian zarzuela in one act
   1938 Lliri blau Ballet in two acts
   1938 Sino Ballet in one act
   1946 Joyel Ballet
   1956 Maror, opera. Text de Xavier Casp

Choir

   1941 Aclamaciones for male choir
   1947 Hermosita, hermosita
   1950 Two songs from Alicante
   1951 Cançó innocent de Blanca Fe
   1952 Dos líricas de Anacreonte for male choir
   1952 Scherzino for female choir
   1956 Bienaventurados
   1958 Lletania en flor for female and children's choir
   1958 Sega, segador
   1959 Cançó d'hivern
   1960 Four coral poems
   1963 Laudate Dominum omnes gentes
   1963 Quatre petites composicions
   1965 La Santa Cena
   1967 Cançoneta del balcó for female choir
   Cançons humorístiques

More works

   1918 Gozos al Patriarca San José for choir and organ
   1918 Rosario for choir and organ
   1942 Nupcias for  organ
   1944 Himno al Apostolado de la Oración for choir and organ
   1944/1960 M in g-minor for soloists, choir and orchestra 
   1945 Atardecer  for soloists, choir and orchestra
   1945 Ave María for tenor, choir and orchestra
   1946 Deus Israel conjugat Vos for children's choir and orchestra
   1954 Anthem a Sant Vicent Ferrer for choir and organ
   1955 Anthem for Coronació del Sant Crist de la Fe for choir and organ
   1956 Credo for choir and organ
   1956 Himno a la Santísima Virgen de la Fuensanta for choir and organ
   1956 Himno de María Santísima de Araceli for choir and organ
   1959 Cants de primavera for soprano, female choir and orchestra
   1961 Cantarella for children's choir and organ
   1961 Justus germinabit for choir and organ
   1965 Balada a l'absent for soprano, female choir and orchestra
   1965 Canción amatoria for female choir and orchestra
   1965 Cançons de la llar for female choir and orchestra
   1965 Cançons del folklore infantívol for female choir and orchestra
   1965 Rapsòdia d'abril for soprano, female choir and orchestra
   1965 Seguerilles for female choir and orchestra
   1965 Vibración de estío for female choir and orchestra
   Fughetta per a conjunt de saxòfons
   Anthem to The Purísima for choir and organ
   Anthem to Virgen de las Angustias for choir and organ
   Danza Y Copla del Ausente for harp, published by UME
