= Opera Orchestra of New York =

Orchestra in New York City

- Orchestra
- Short name: OONY
- Founded: 1971
- Location: New York City, U.S.
- Concert hall: Carnegie Hall
- Principal conductor: Eve Queler
- Music director: Eve Queler

The Opera Orchestra of New York (OONY) specializes in the performance of opera in concert form. It is particularly known for its work in presenting rarely-performed repertory. Among the numerous American premieres it has presented are Puccini's Edgar, Boito's Nerone, and Smetana's Libuše.

== History ==
Founded in 1971 (Note: The Opera Orchestra of New York grew from a smaller project, the New York Opera Workshop, which Queler had started in 1967.) by Eve Queler, who remains its conductor and music director, the orchestra presented its first season in 1972 with two operas – Rossini's William Tell and Meyerbeer's L'Africaine – performed at Carnegie Hall. Since then, it has presented over ninety different operas there, with the season now consisting of three to four operas, which are also broadcast on NPR. In the past, tickets came with a complete libretto of the opera being performed; however, the 2007–2008 season introduced surtitles for the first time.

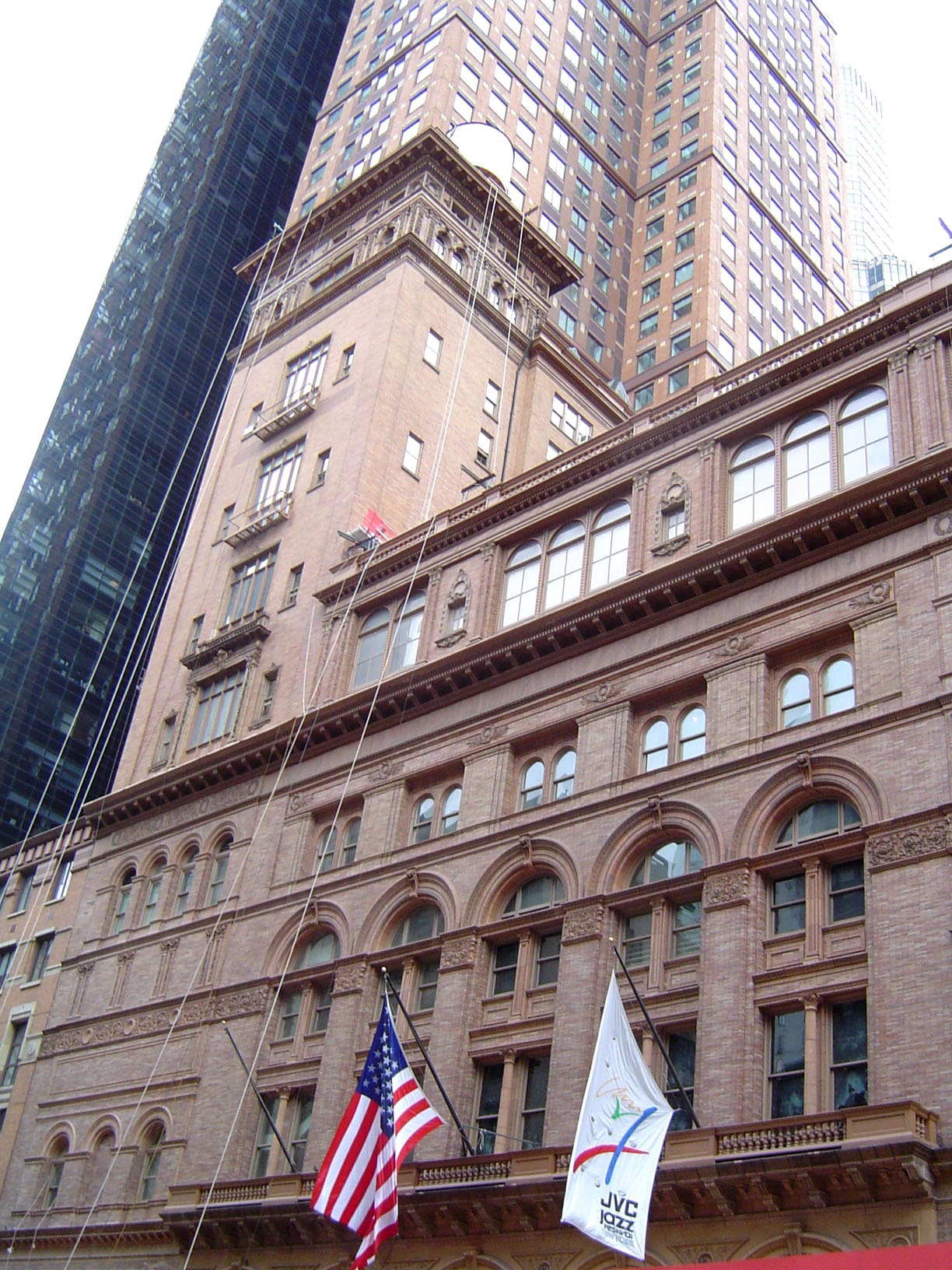
Carnegie Hall, OONY's performance venue

Financial difficulties in early 2007 threatened to close the company or severely curtail its 2007–2008 season to one opera. However, these were overcome, and the 2007–2008 season of three operas opened as planned on December 13, 2007, with Verdi's I due Foscari. An additional Gala concert celebrating Eve Queler's 100th performance conducting the orchestra at Carnegie Hall was presented in March 2008. In 2011, The New York Times reported that the orchestra, under new musical director Alberto Veronesi, had returned to financial stability.

Many prominent opera singers have performed with the orchestra, including Plácido Domingo, Nicolai Gedda, Gabriela Beňačková, Montserrat Caballé, Carlo Bergonzi, Renata Scotto, Alfredo Kraus, José Carreras, Dmitri Hvorostovsky, Bryan Hymel, Angela Meade, Marcello Giordani, Jennifer Larmore, Samuel Ramey, James Morris, Angela Gheorghiu, Roberto Alagna, Jonas Kaufmann, Mignon Dunn, Grace Bumbry, and Ghena Dimitrova, many of them in the very early stages of their careers. (José Carreras made his OONY debut in 1972 on his 24th birthday.)

In 1978, the Opera Orchestra of New York instituted a Young Artists Program to train and showcase young singers. Participants sing small roles in the Carnegie Hall performances and understudy the principal ones. Notable past participants in the program include Renée Fleming, Vivica Genaux, and Deborah Voigt.

== Performances ==
=== 2000s ===
2016

- May: Donizetti – Parisina d'Este: Meade, Blake, Vemic, Wang

2014

- June: Donizetti – Roberto Devereux: Devia, Costello, Chauvet, Kapusta

2012–2013

- January: Giordano – Andrea Chénier: Alagna, Petean, Pershall, Feinstein, Lamanda
- April: Verdi – I Lombardi: Fabiano, Meade, Short, Baetge, Cedel, Baldwin, et al.

2011–2012

- November: Cilèa – Adriana Lecouvreur: Gheorghiu, Kaufmann, Maestri, Rachvelishvili
- January: Wagner – Rienzi: Storey, Matos, Chauvet, DeVine, Cedel, et al.

2010–2011

- October: Mascagni – Cavalleria rusticana: Alagna, Guleghina, Dunn, Almaguer, Swann
- October: Massenet – La Navarraise: Alagna, Garanca, Abdrazakov, Savage, Kontes, McGee
- March: Meyerbeer – L'Africaine: Giordani, Taigi, Dehn, Mvinjelwa

2008–2009

- October: Rimsky-Korsakov – The Tsar's Bride: Borodina, Makarina, Markov, Manucharyan, Stamboglis, Easterlin, Nance, Miller, Stepanov, Sullivan, McGee

2007–2008

- December: Verdi – I due Foscari: DiGiacomo, Gavanelli, Grooms, Machado, Lagundino, Lugo, Orsalak
- February: Bellini – La Sonnambula: Gutié;rrez, Korchak, Furlanetto, Caballero, Garcia, Kontes, Grooms
- April: Puccini – Edgar: Giordani, Larmore, Moore, Gaertner, Guagliardo

2006–2007

- November: Donizetti – Dom Sébastien: Kasarova, Korchak, Powell, Gaertner, Williams
- January: Rossini – Otello: Donose, Ford, Tarver, McPherson
- February: Cilèa – L'Arlesiana: Cornetti, Filianoti, Moore, Risinger, Lee

2005–2006

- November: Rossini – William Tell: Blasi, Giordani, Chingari
- February: Delibes – Lakmé: Gutiérrez, Manucharyan, Morris
- May: Montemezzi – L'Amore Dei Tre Re: Bravo, Casanova, Ramey

2004–2005

- November: Puccini – La Fanciulla del West: Millo, Tanner, Chingari
- April: Thomas – Mignon: Gutiérrez, Blythe, Aldrich, Giordano, Relyea
- June: Weber – Der Freischütz: Margiono, Moon, Studebaker, Kowaljow

2003–2004

- December: Donizetti – Anna Bolena: Stoyanova, Larmore, Aldrich, Manucharyan, Morris
- March: Verdi – Il Corsaro: Dragoni, Potenza, Casanova, Liao
- April: Ponchielli – La Gioconda: Millo, Kitic, Nadler, Giordani, Golesorkhi, Faria

2002–2003

- October: Bizet – Les Pêcheurs de Perles: Takova, Shtoda, Chaignaud, Faria
- April: Verdi – Attila: Flanigan, Casanova, Liao, Ramey
- May: Rossini – La donna del lago: Swenson, Blythe, Fowler, Zeffiri, Youngblood

2001–2002

- November: Verdi – La Battaglia di Legnano: Stoyanova, Wood, Casanova, Guelfi, Kowaljow
- March: Cilèa – Adriana Lecouvreur: Millo, Ernest, Stewart, Zajick, Giordani, Laciura, Golesorkhi
- April: Donizetti – Marino Faliero: Blancas, Bernhardt, Blake, Liao, Relyea

2000–2001

- March: Donizetti – La Favorita: Larmore, Gilbert, Kunde, Hvorostovsky, Kowaljow
- April: Meyerbeer – Les Huguenots: Stoyanova, Makarina, Zifchak, Giordani, Simpson, Faria
- May: Donizetti – Maria Stuarda: Swenson, Flanigan, Matos, Kunde, Liao, Carfizzi

=== 1990s ===
1999–2000

- October: Bellini – I Capuleti e i Montecchi: Massis, Kasarova, Kunde, Carfizzi, Cokorinos
- November: Donizetti – Adelia: Devia, Mok, Pyatnychko, Plishka
- February: Donizetti – Lucrezia Borgia: Fleming, Blythe, Giordani, Peterson
- May: Verdi – Otello: Esperian, Kitic, Bergonzi/Barasorda, Zhang, Gazale, Plishka

1998–1999

- March: Verdi – I Masnadieri: Wolf, Nagore, Hvorostovsky, Plishka, Konstantinov
- April: Halévy – La Juive: Papian, Makarina, Casanova, Viala, Plishka
- May: Bellini – La Sonnambula: Swenson, Tapia, Wood, Kunde, Relyea

1997–1998

- November: Rossini – Tancredi: O'Flynn, Kasarova, Poretsky, Wood, Breault, Boutros
- February: Verdi – Jerusalem: Valayre, Ikaia-Purdy, Simpson
- May: Donizetti – Poliuto: Rowland, Armiliato, Meoni, Alberghini

1996–1997

- January: Rossini – La Cenerentola: Genaux, Makarina, Wood, Fowler, G. Quilico
- February: Wagner – Tristan und Isolde: Connell, Lang, Siukola, Ryerson, Breault, Brainerd
- April: Verdi – Ernani: Anderson, Margison, Guelfi, Plishka

1995–1996

- December: Bellini – Norma: Eaglen, Ganassi, Furdui, di Renzi, Anisimov, Moore
- April: Rossini – Armida: Fleming, Kunde, Fowler
- May: Verdi – Giovanna d'Arco: Anderson, Grigorian, Moore, Guelfi, Owens

1994–1995

- February: Massenet – Hérodiade: Fleming, Bumbry, Keyes, Del Campo
- March: Rimsky-Korsakov – The Tsar's Bride: Focile, Borodina, Uhlenhopp, Leiferkus, Plishka
- May: Bellini – I Puritani: Devia, Wood, Kunde, Guelfi, Peterson

1993–1994

- December: Donizetti – Linda di Chamounix: Esposito, Poretsky, Sabbatini, Frontali, Heimann, Plishka
- February: Bellini – I Capuleti e i Montecchi: Devia, Larmore, Gimenez, Spagnoli, Robbins
- March: Donizetti – Caterina Cornaro: Rowland, d'Auria, Bruson, Colombara

1992–1993

- February: Bellini – La Straniera: Fleming, Liang, Kunde, Laperriere
- April: Donizetti – Anna Bolena: Vaness, Scalchi, Sonnenberg, de la Mora, Plishka
- May: Tchaikovsky – Mazeppa: Anderson, Grunewald, Grigorian, Leiferkus, Plishka

1991–1992

- January: Boieldieu – La Dame Blanche: Fleming, Uecker, Swensen, Charbonneau, Castel (Narrator)
- March: Wagner – Rienzi: Pick-Hieronimi, Graham, Goldberg
- April: Verdi – I Due Foscari: Rowland, Short, Villa, Chernov

1990–1991

- January: Donizetti – Roberto Devereux: Rowland, Zambalis, de la Mora, Chernov
- February: Bellini – La Sonnambula: Anderson, Keith, Gimenez, Plishka
- March: Weber – Der Freischütz: Behrens, Giering, Heppner, Rahming, Sotin

=== 1980s ===
1989–1990

- January: Verdi – I Vespri Siciliani: S. Dunn, Brubaker/Glassman, Bruson, Plishka
- February: Tchaikovsky – Maid of Orleans: Martin, Zajick, Kulko, Hynninen, Koptchak, Nikolsky
- April: Catalani – La Wally: Millo, Kotoski, Johannsson, Manuguerra

1988–1989

- October: Bellini – Beatrice di Tenda: Anderson, Zseller, Kiurkciev, Tumagian
- January: Giordano – Fedora: Marton, Blackwell, Todisco, Serrano
- March: Bellini – Il Pirata: Millo, Liang, Morino, Croft

1987–1988

- February: Meyerbeer – Robert le Diable: Mims, Ginsberg, Merritt, Laciura, Ramey
- March: Giordano – Andrea Chénier: Millo, Bean, Polozov, Laciura
- March: Janáček – Jenufa: Benacková, Rysanek, Ochman, Kazaras

1986–1987

- January: Verdi – La Battaglia di Legnano: Millo, Malagnini, Manuguerra, Hines
- February: Wagner – Ring Cycle final scenes: Marton, Bean, Goldberg, McFarland, Roloff
- May: Dvořák – Rusalka: Benacková, Kelm, Jenkins, Koptchak

1985–1986

- January: Verdi – I Lombardi: Millo, Ginsberg, Bergonzi, Di Domenico, Plishka
- March: Smetana – Libuše: Benacková, Roark-Strummer, Zitek, Plishka
- May: Ponchielli – La Giaconda: Dimitrova, Milcheva, Curry, Lamberti, Cappuccilli, Plishka

1984–1985

- October: Glinka – A Life for the Tsar: Markova, Wenkel, Merritt, Talvela
- November: Rossini – William Tell: Evstatieva, Lopardo, Cappuccilli, Bonisolli
- April: Lalo – Le Roi d'Ys: Hendricks, Ciurca, Raffalli, Vento

1983–1984

- November: Strauss, R. – Die Liebe der Danae: Plowright, Blackwell, Ulfung, Kazaras, Roloff
- March: Donizetti – Dom Sébastien: Takacs, Leech, Miller, Koptchak
- May: Verdi – Nabucco: Dimitrova, Schuman, Pinto, Monk, Plishka

1982–1983

- October: Donizetti – Il Duca d'Alba: Krilovici, Gonzalez, Manuguerra
- January: Strauss, R. – Guntram: Tokody, Goldberg, Roloff, Wimberger
- May: Berlioz – Benvenuto Cellini: Devia, Boozer, Gedda, Lafont, Vento

1981–1982

- October: Verdi – I Due Foscari: Castro-Alberty, Bergonzi, Bruson, Albert
- February: Wagner – Rienzi: Massey, Payer, Warner, Hamari, Albert, Johns, Poole, Behl
- March: Wagner – Rienzi: Evans, Hamari, Johns
- April: Boito – Nerone: Andrade, Takács, Cigoj, Elvira, Morris

1980–1981

- March: Mussorgsky – Khovanshchina: Alexieva, Toczyska, Kazaras, Gulyas, Mroz, Monk, Plishka
- April: Delibes – Lakmé: Devia, Spacagna, Gedda, Plishka
- June: Mercadante – Il Giuramento: Zampieri, Martin, Baltsa, Gulyas, Edwards

=== 1970s ===
1979–1980

- February: Massenet – Hérodiade: Verdejo, Greevy, Estes, Pons, Plishka
- March: Donizetti – Lucrezia Borgia: Ricciarelli, Gonzalez, Manuguerra
- April: Wagner – Rienzi: Payer, Hamari, Sooter

1978–1979

- February: Janáček – Kátya Kabanová: Benacková, Kniplová, Lewis, Evitts, Chudy
- April: Verdi – Aroldo: Caballé, Cecchele, Pons
- May: Bellini – I Capuleti e i Montecchi: Putnam, Troyanos, Tenzi, Robbins, Martinovich

1977–1978

- February: Weber – Oberon: Jones, Hamari, Gedda, West
- March: Rossini – Tancredi: Ricciarrelli, Balthrop, Horne, Paunova, Palacio, Zaccaria

1976–1977

- January: Smetana – Dalibor: Sormova, Kubiak, Gedda, Monk, Plishka
- April: Puccini – Edgar :Scotto, Killebrew, Bergonzi, Sardinero

1975–1976

- January: Berlioz – Lélio: Scotto, Aler, Burchinal, Madden (Narrator)
- March: Massenet – Le Cid: Bumbry, Bergquist, Domingo, Gardner, Voketaitis, Plishka
- March: Donizetti – Gemma di Vergy: Caballé, Lima, Quilico, Plishka

1974–1975

- February: Verdi – I Masnadieri: Trombin, Lewis, Manuguerra, Plishka
- February: Donizetti – La Favorita: Hendricks, Verrett, Kraus, Elvira, Morris

1973–1974

- January: Bizet – Les Pêcheurs de Perles: Eda-Pierre, Gedda, Bruson, West
- March: Donizetti – Parisina d'este: Caballé, Pruett, Quilico, Morris

1972–1973

- December: Verdi – I Lombardi: Scotto, Carreras, Marini, Plishka
- March: Zandonai – Francesca da Rimini: Kabaivanska, Domingo, Manuguerra

1971–1972

- March: Rossini – William Tell: Barlow, Toscano, Walker/Lo Monoco, Quilico, Morris
- April: Meyerbeer – L'Africaine: Elgar, Stella, Tucker, Manuguerra

== Recordings ==
Recording date	Title	Composer	Label	Personnel (roles) / Notes
March 8, 1976	Le Cid	Jules Massenet	CBS/Sony	Grace Bumbry (Chimene), Plácido Domingo (Rodrigo), Paul Plishka (Don Diego), Clinton Ingram (Don Arias), Theodre Hodges (Don Alonzo), Arnold Voketaitis (The Count de Gormas), Eleanor Bergquist (The Infanta), Jake Gardner (The King), Peter Lightfoot (The Moorish Envoy), John Adams (St. James), Byrne Camp Chorale (Director: Bryne Camp), Opera Orchestra of New York (Conductor: Eve Queler); world-premiere recording, live at Carnegie Hall
March 14, 1976	Gemma di Vergy	Gaetano Donizetti	CBS/Sony	Montserrat Caballé (Gemma di Vergy), Paul Plishka (Guido), Luis Lima (Tamas), Louis Quilico (Count di Vergy), Natalya Chudy (Ida), Mark Munkittrick (Rolando), Schola Cantorum (Director: Hugh Ross), Opera Orchestra of New York (Conductor: Eve Queler); world-premiere recording, live at Carnegie Hall
April 1979	Aroldo	Giuseppe Verdi	CBS/Sony	Montserrat Caballé (Mina), Gianfranco Cecchele (Aroldo), Juan Pons (Egberto), Louis Lebherz (Briano), Vincenzo Manno (Godvino), Paul Ragers (Enrico), Marianna Busching (Elena), Oratorio Society of New York, Westchester Choral Society (Director: Lyndon Woodside), Opera Orchestra of New York (Conductor: Eve Queler); world-premiere recording, live at Carnegie Hall
