= Manuel Galduf =

Spanish conductor

Manuel Galduf (born 1942 in Llíria), is a Spanish Orchestra conductor.

== Career ==
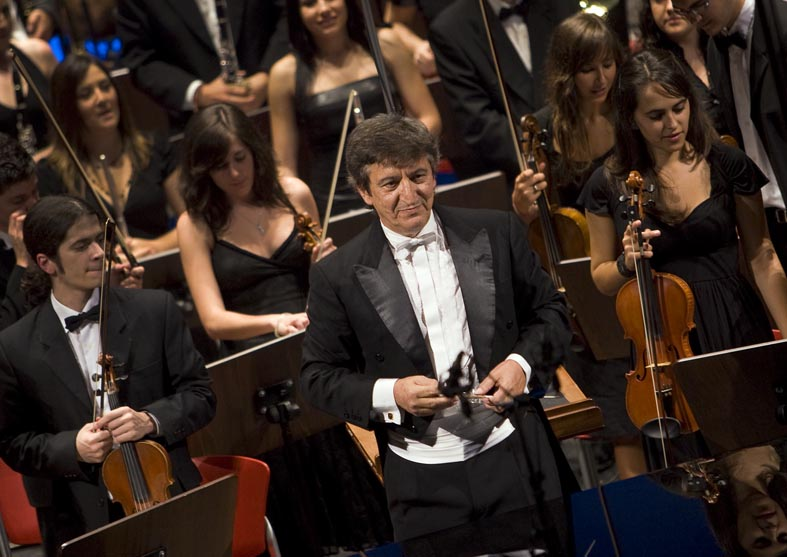
Manuel Galduf (2008)

Galduf studied at the Valencia Conservatory of Music (Orchestra musical direction, composition, violin, piano and oboe), having among his teachers Valencian composer Manuel Palau. He undertook postgraduate education with Volker Wangenheim (German conductor) and Igor Markevitch (Ukrainian conductor). Professor Galduf and Markevich developed an intense professional relationship being considered Markevich's favorite postgraduate student in the early 1960s. Galduf was military music director until 1980, at the same time that was conducting prestigious orchestras all around the globe and being professor of orchestra direction at the Seville Conservatory. He gave up the army and focused on a musical director career. He has conducted several prestigious worldwide orchestras such as Nationale de France, English Chamber Orchestra, Hungarian Philharmonic, National of Venezuela. Florida Festival Orchestra, Dresdner Philarmonie, etc. From 1983 until 1997 he was the principal conductor of the Valencia Orchestra and has conducted most of the current Spanish symphonic orchestras. He is known for having premiered many current Spanish compositors works.

He was professor of Orchestral Conductqqing at the Valencia Conservatory until 2012 when he retired. He is fellow of the Royal Societies of Arts San Fernando and San Carlos. Several of Galduf's students have reached highest positions in both conducting and composition, including Cesar Cano (Spanish Musical Compositor) and Pilar Vaño (Orchestra Conductor). Since 1999 he is the principal director of the Youth Orchestra of Valencia where he works with young musicians.

== See also ==
- Orquesta de Valencia
- Real Academia de Bellas Artes de San Fernando
- Ateneo Musical y de Enseñanza Banda Primitiva de Liria
