= Alberto Veronesi =

Italian conductor (born 1965)

Alberto Veronesi (born 1965) is an Italian conductor. Born in Milan, he is a student of Myung-Whun Chung.

== Discography ==
Of Sephardic Jewish origin on his mother's side, Veronesi began recording operas for Deutsche Grammophon in 2006 working with Plácido Domingo in rarer verismo repertoire such as Puccini’s Edgar and rare Puccini arias and duets, Leoncavallo’s I Medici and La Nuit de mai, and Giordano’s Fedora. In 2008 he recorded Mascagni's L'amico Fritz with Roberto Alagna and Angela Gheorghiu live in Berlin for Deutsche Grammophon.
