= Madrid Academic Orchestra =

- Orchestra
- Founded: 1997
- Principal conductor: Iñigo Pírfano
- Website: www.orquestaacademicademadrid.com

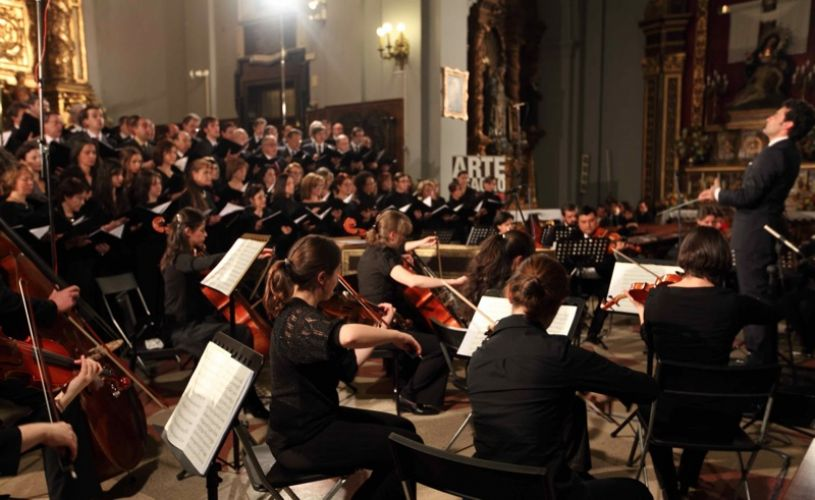
The Madrid Academical Orchestra in the Festival of Sacre Music

The Madrid Academic Orchestra (Orquesta Académica de Madrid in Spanish), founded in 1997, is an orchestra based in Madrid, Spain.

== History ==
Founded in 1997 by its current conductor, Iñigo Pírfano, the Madrid Academic Orchestra was created to offer an orchestra platform for young professionals to play in a full professional orchestra.

== See also ==
- Madrid Symphony Orchestra
- Spanish National Orchestra
- RTVE Symphony Orchestra
- Teatro Real
- National Auditorium of Music
- Teatro Monumental
- Zarzuela
- Teatro de la Zarzuela
