= Pablo Ferrández =

Spanish cellist

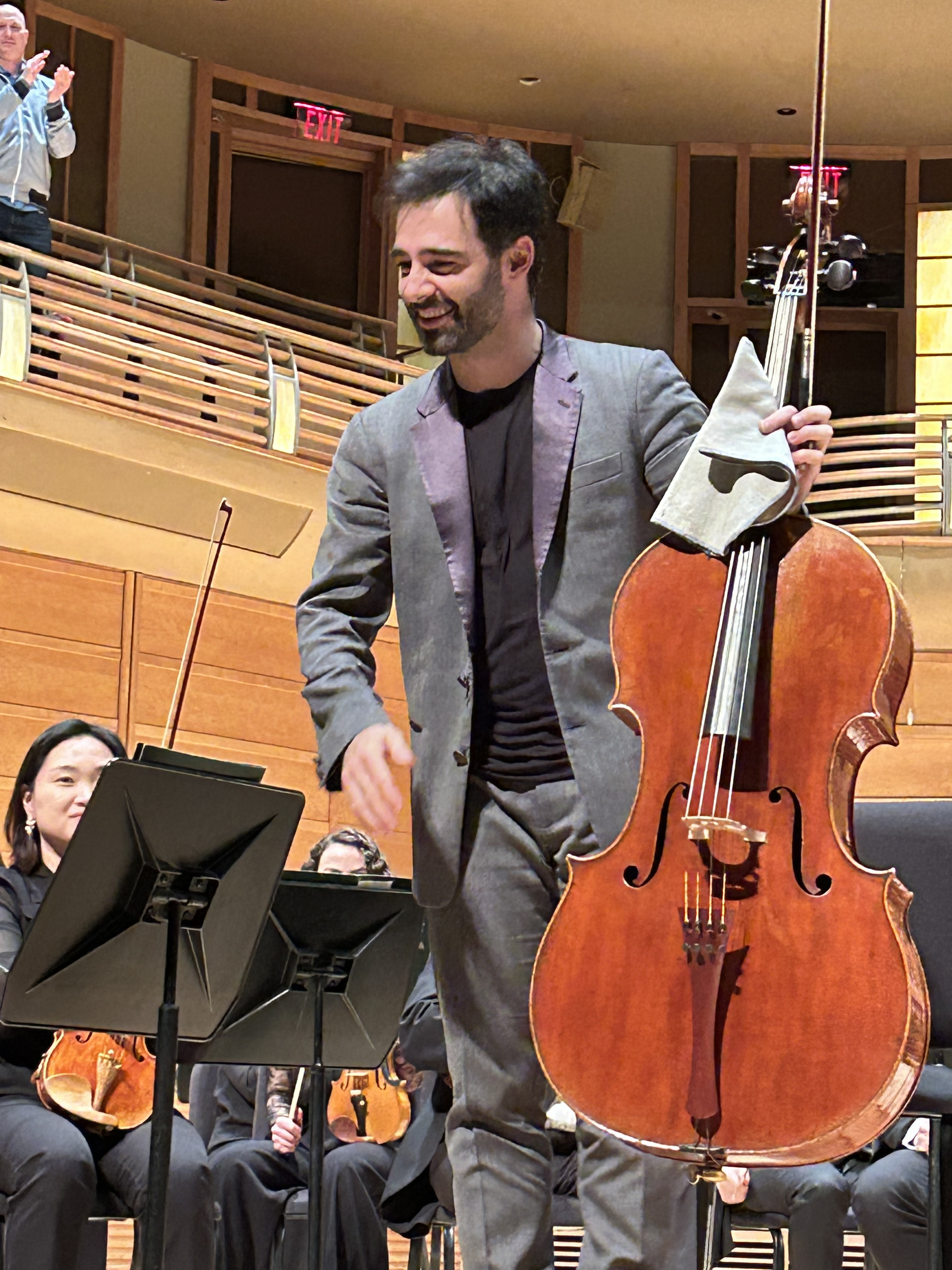
Ferrández in 2023

Pablo Ferrández (born 19 March 1991) is a Spanish cellist. He has performed as a soloist with orchestras such as the Spanish National Orchestra, the RTVE Symphony Orchestra, the Kremerata Baltica or the Helsinki Philharmonic Orchestra. Pablo has been awarded prizes in numerous competitions: Second Prize at the International Paulo Cello Competition, Edmond de Rothschild Group Award at the Sommets Musicaux de Gstaad Festival, Prix Nicolas Firmenich at the Verbier Festival, Leyda Ungerer Music Prize at the Kronberg Cello Festival and First Prize at the Liezen International Competition.

== Life and career ==
Born in Madrid in 1991, in a family of musicians, Pablo Ferrández joined the Reina Sofía School of Music when he was 13 to study with Natalia Shakhovskaya. After that, he completed his studies at the Kronberg Academy with Frans Helmerson and became a scholar of the Anne-Sophie Mutter Foundation. Pablo Ferrández has worked with conductors such as Antoni Ros-Marba, Peter Csaba, Sergio Alapont, José Luis Turina, Oleg Caetani, Martyn Brabbins, John Axelrod and Rossen Milanov and with orchestras such as the Spanish National Orchestra, RTVE Symphony Orchestra, Orquesta Sinfónica del Principado de Asturias, Kremerata Baltica, Helsinki Philharmonic Orchestra, Tapiola Sinfonietta, Orchestre National des Pays de la Loire, Antwerp Symphony Orchestra and the Stuttgarter Philharmoniker, among others.

As a chamber musician he has performed with Rainer Schmidt, Ivry Gitlis, Gidon Kremer, Vilde Frang and Ana Chumachenco and he is a member of the Flamel Trio, that was founded at the Chamber Music Institute in Madrid.

The international career of Pablo Ferrández includes concerts held in the United States, Switzerland, Finland and Germany. He has performed at international festivals such as the Verbier Festival, Casals Festival, Festival Spivakov, Festival Internacional de Santander, Kronberg Festival, Festspiele Mecklenburg-Vorpommern, Festival Piatgorsky and Sommets Misicaux de Gstaad, among others.

Recently, he has become the first Spanish cellist to be loaned a Stradivarius from the Nippon Music Foundation. The Stradivarius he plays is called Lord Aylesford and is one of the oldest in the world, dating from 1696. It was played by Gregor Piatigorsky and belonged to Janos Starker. Pablo Ferrández was selected to be given the instrument by a jury composed by eminent musicians and musicologists chaired by Lorin Maazel.

== Discography ==
- Haydn and Korngold cello concertos with the Royal Liverpool Philharmonic Orchestra conducted by Alpesh Chauhan
- Dvorak and Schumann cello concertos with the Stuttgart Philharmonic Orchestra conducted by Radoslaw Szulc.
- Rossini and Menotti concertos, with the Kremerata Baltica conducted by Heinrich Schiff.

== Awards ==
- Second Prize at the International Paulo Cello Competition (Finland), 2013.
- Edmond de Rothschild-Prize Group at the Sommet Musicaux Festival de Gstaad, 2013.
- Scholarship Pablo Casals from the Pablo Casals Foundation, 2012.
- Nicolas Firmenich Prize at the Verbier Festival (Switzerland), 2011.
- Leyda Ungerer Prize at the Kronberg Cello Festival (Germany), 2011.
- First Prize at the Liezen International Cello Competition (Austria), 2008.
