= Violin Concerto No. 2 (Prokofiev) =

Concerto by Sergei Prokofiev

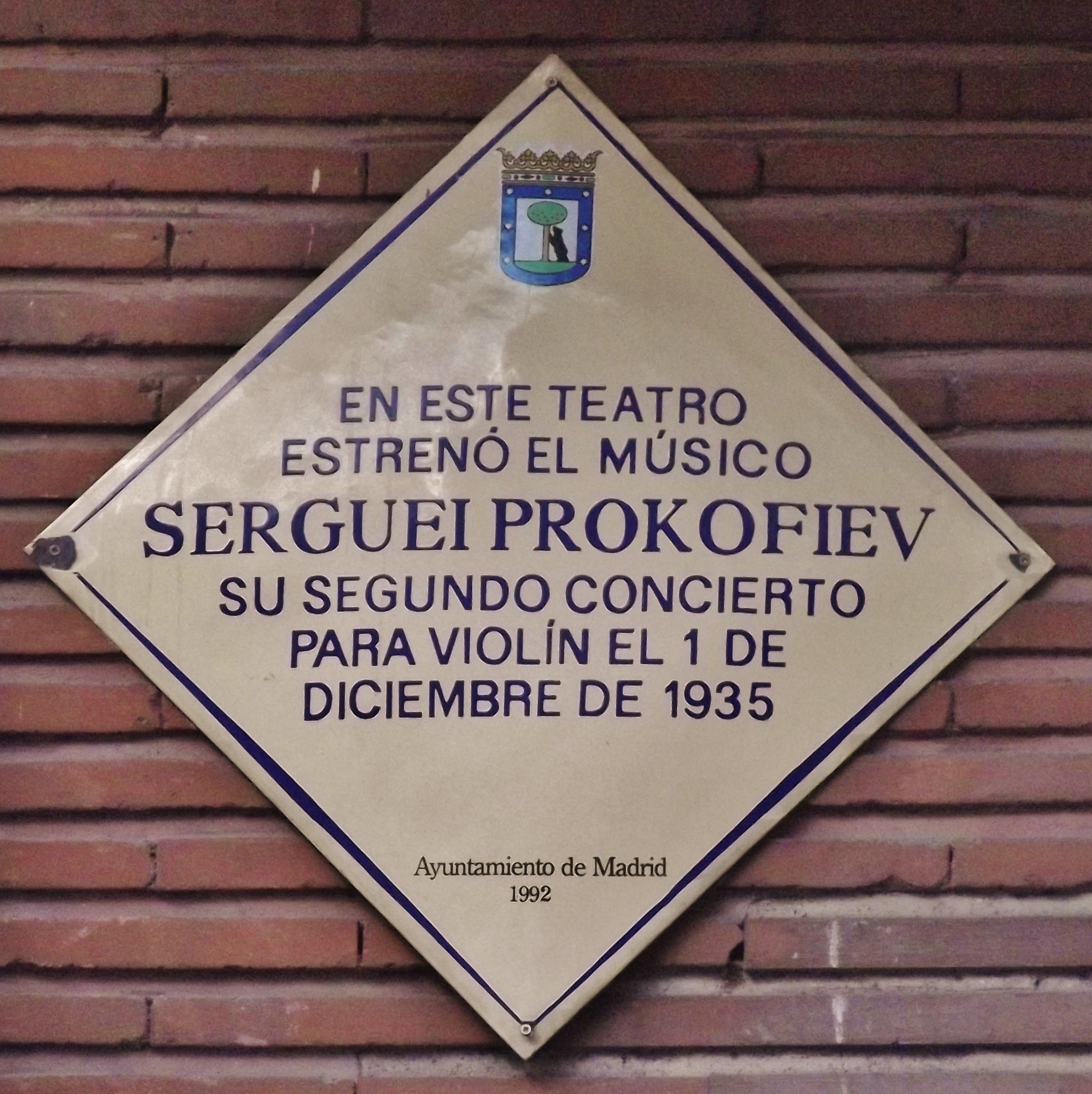
Commemorative plaque placed on Teatro Monumental in Madrid.

The Violin Concerto No. 2 in G minor, Op. 63, was written in 1935 by Sergei Prokofiev.

== Background ==
The violin concerto was premiered on 1 December 1935 at the Teatro Monumental in Madrid by the French violinist Robert Soetens and the Madrid Symphony Orchestra conducted by Enrique Fernández Arbós. Prokofiev wrote it after the first performance, by Soetens and Samuel Dushkin, of his Sonata for Two Violins, which pleased him greatly. Igor Stravinsky had recently written a concerto for Dushkin, and Prokofiev did the same for Soetens. Prokofiev was on a concert tour with Soetens while he was working on the concerto, and he later wrote, "the number of places in which I wrote the Concerto shows the kind of nomadic concert-tour life I led then. The main theme of the 1st movement was written in Paris, the first theme of the 2nd movement at Voronezh, the orchestration was finished in Baku and the premiere was given in Madrid."

The Spanish liked the premiere so much that they sent a delegation of musicians to thank Prokofiev afterward.

The first two British performances of the concerto were again with Soetens: in 1936 under Sir Henry J. Wood, and in 1938, under the composer. Soetens played the work many times, all over the world, concluding with the premiere performance in South Africa in 1972, when he was 75 (he continued appearing in public until age 95, and died in 1997, aged 100).

== Music ==
It is in three movements:

1. Allegro moderato
2. Andante assai
3. Allegro, ben marcato

The concerto is more conventional than the composer's early bold compositions. It starts off with a simple violin melody related to traditional Russian folk music. The second movement's lyrical theme, first played by the soloist, reappears in the orchestra's somber lower register, accompanied by the soloist. Its middle section, Allegretto, contains a wistful and energetic theme from a solo clarinet and eventually the violin, over a busy accompaniment. The third movement's rondo has a taste of Spain, with the clacking of castanets each time the theme appears.

Apart from the solo violin, the concerto is scored for moderate-sized orchestra, including two flutes, two oboes, two clarinets, two bassoons, two horns, two trumpets, percussion (snare drum, bass drum, castanets, cymbals, and triangle), and strings.

== In theatre ==
- Violin Concerto No. 2, a ballet by Anthon Pimonov, was premiered by the Mariinsky Ballet at the Mariinsky Theatre on 4 July 2016.

== Selected recordings ==
- Jascha Heifetz with the Boston Symphony Orchestra, conducted by Serge Koussevitzky, 1951
- David Oistrakh with the Philharmonia Orchestra, conducted by Alceo Galliera, 1958
- Shlomo Mintz with the Chicago Symphony Orchestra, conducted by Claudio Abbado, 1984
- Cho-Liang Lin with the Los Angeles Philharmonic Orchestra, conducted by Esa-Pekka Salonen, 1994
