= Spanish National Orchestra =

Orchestra based in Madrid, Spain

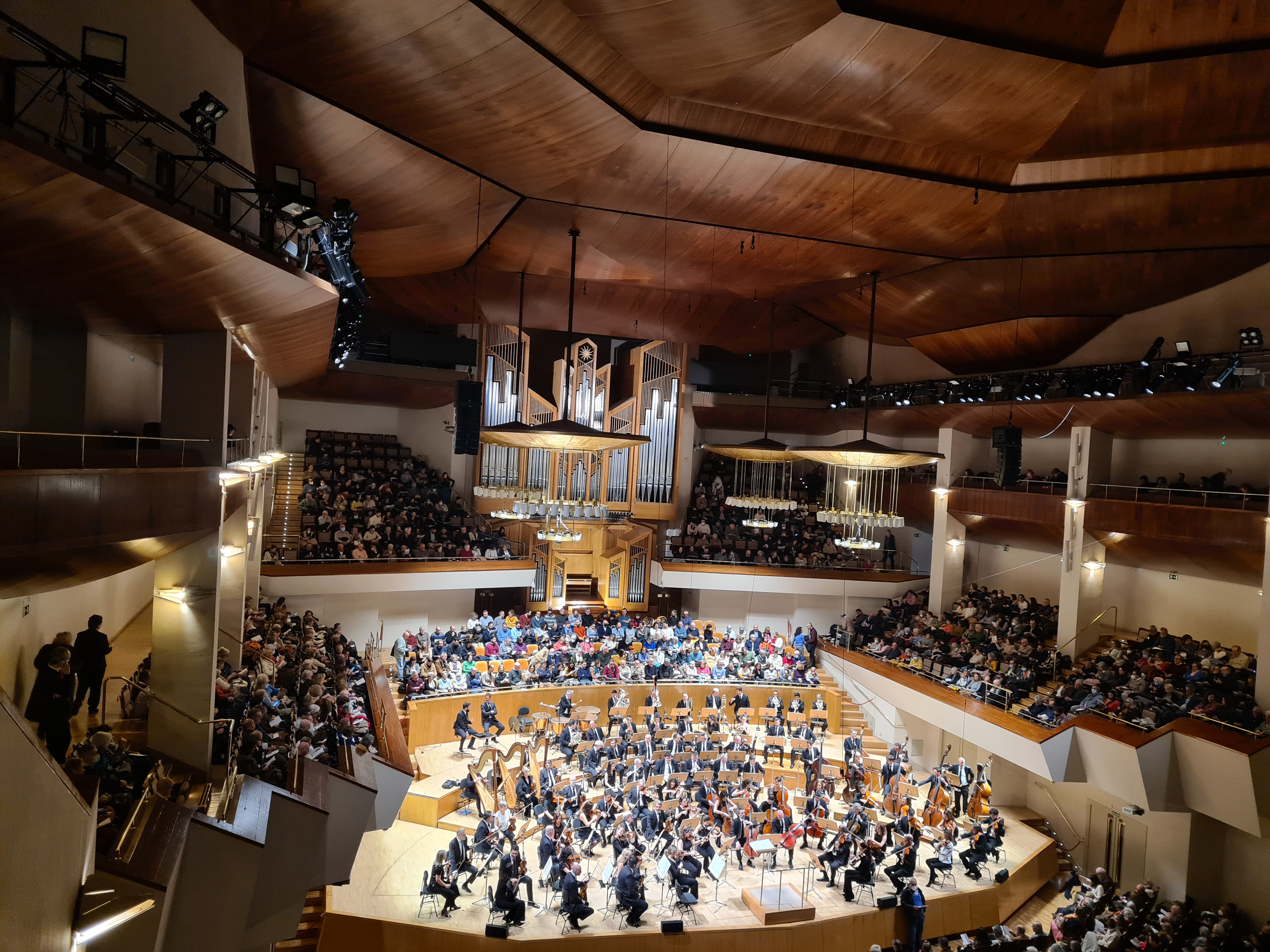
Spanish National Orchestra, Madrid, Auditorio Nacional 2024

The Orquesta Nacional de España (Spanish National Orchestra) is a Spanish orchestra based in Madrid.

== History ==
The orchestra originated in 1937, during the Spanish Civil War, and received full legal establishment in 1940, with the merging of two orchestras, the Filarmónica, previously under the direction of Bartolomé Pérez Casas, and the Orquesta Sinfónica, previously under the direction of Enrique Fernández Arbós.

The first official concert of the newly founded orchestra was in March 1941 at the Teatro María Guerrero in Madrid, conducted by the Portuguese conductor Pedro de Freitas Branco (1896–1963). The principal conductors of the first years of the orchestra were Ernesto Halffter, José María Franco, Enrique Jordá, Eduard Toldrà and Jesús Arámbarri, until the appointment of the first principal conductor of the orchestra, Bartolomé Pérez Casas. After the death of Pérez Casas, the next principal conductor was Ataúlfo Argenta, who had served in the orchestra from 1945 as the keyboard instruments player.

In 2014, David Afkham became principal conductor of the orchestra. In February 2019, the orchestra announced the elevation of Afkham's title to chief conductor and artistic director, effective with the 2019–2020 season. In January 2023, the orchestra announced an extension of Afkham's contract through September 2026. Afkham stood down as chief conductor of the orchestra at the close of the 2025–2026 season, after the debut of the orchestra at the BBC Proms in July 2026.

In April 2024, Kent Nagano first guest-conducted the orchestra. He returned for subsequent guest-conducting appearances in June 2021 and April 2024. In December 2024, the orchestra announced the appointment of Nagano as its next artistic director and chief conductor, effective with the 2026–2027 season, with an initial contract of five seasons.

== Principal conductors ==
- Bartolomé Pérez Casas (1942–1947)
- Ataúlfo Argenta (1947–1958)
- Rafael Frühbeck de Burgos (1962–1978)
- Antoni Ros-Marbà (1978–1981)
- Jesús López-Cobos (1984–1989)
- Aldo Ceccato (1991–1994)
- Josep Pons (2003–2011)
- David Afkham (2014–2026)
- Kent Nagano (2026–present)

== See also ==
- Madrid Symphony Orchestra
- Community of Madrid Orchestra
- National Auditorium of Music
- RTVE Symphony Orchestra
- Queen Sofía Chamber Orchestra
- Teatro Real
- Teatro Monumental
- Zarzuela
