= Sonata for Two Violins (Prokofiev) =

1932 sonata composed by Sergei Prokofiev

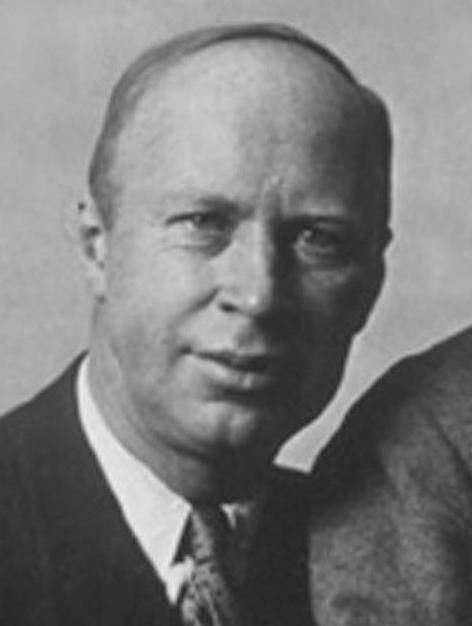
Sergei Prokofiev in 1936

Sergei Prokofiev composed his Sonata for Two Violins in C major, Op. 56, in 1932 during his vacation near St. Tropez as a commission piece to conclude the inaugural concert of Triton, a Paris-based society dedicated to presenting new chamber music. That concert was held on 16 December 1932.

However, with the composer's permission, the sonata was performed for the first time three weeks earlier in Moscow, on 27 November 1932 by Dmitry Tsyganov and Vassily Shirinsky, both members of the Beethoven Quartet. The performance at the Triton concert was the "Western premiere". The performers on that occasion were Robert Soetens – for whom Prokofiev would compose his second violin concerto in 1935 – and Samuel Dushkin, for whom Stravinsky composed his violin concerto a few months earlier. The work was published in 1932 in Berlin by Éditions Russes de Musique.

In his 1941 autobiography, Prokofiev wrote about the origin of the work:

Listening to bad music sometimes inspires good ideas... After once hearing an unsuccessful piece [unspecified] for two violins without piano accompaniment, it struck me that in spite of the apparent limitations of such a duet one could make it interesting enough to listen to for ten or fifteen minutes....

Regarding the Paris premiere, Prokofiev further adds:

[My] Sonata was presented at the official opening of Triton, which chanced to coincide with the premiere of my ballet On the Dnieper. Fortunately the ballet began half an hour after the end of the concert, and so immediately after the Sonata we dashed over to the Grand Opéra – musicians, critics, composer all together.

== Structure ==
The sonata is structured in the form of a sonata da chiesa from the Baroque period, in a slow-fast-slow-fast sequence, with a two-part counterpoint:

1. Andante cantabile
2. Allegro
3. Commodo (quasi allegretto)
4. Allegro con brio

A typical performance lasts for about 14 minutes.
