= Community of Madrid Orchestra =

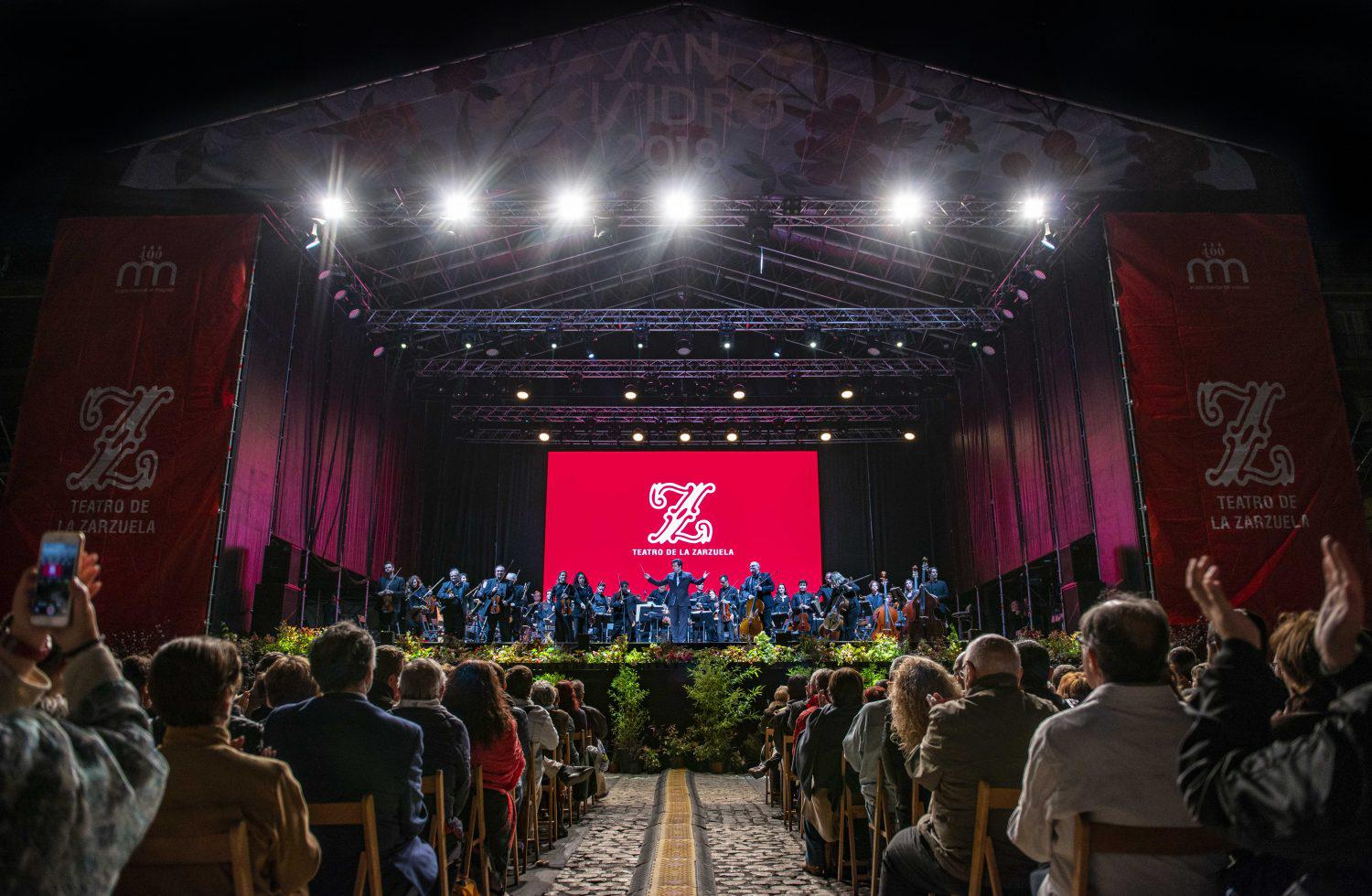
Community of Madrid Orchestra performing at Plaza Mayor, Madrid.

The Community of Madrid Orchestra (Spanish: Orquesta de la Comunidad de Madrid) is a Spanish symphony orchestra based in Madrid. It is the resident orchestra at the Teatro de la Zarzuela in Madrid and performs its concert programmes at the Auditorio Nacional de Música.

== History ==
Founded in 1987, the Community of Madrid Orchestra is the official orchestra of the Community of Madrid. The activity of the Orchestra changed in 1998, when it became the tenured orchestra of the Teatro de la Zarzuela and alternated its appearances between the pit and the stage.

Miguel Groba was the first principal conductor and artistic director of the orchestra, from 1987 to 2000. José Ramón Encinar succeeded Groba and held the posts from 2000 to 2013. Víctor Pablo Pérez served in the posts from 2013 to 2021. The first female conductor to hold the posts was Marzena Diakun, from 2021 to 2024. In January 2024, the orchestra announced the appointment of Alondra de la Parra as its next principal conductor and artistic director, the second female conductor to hold the posts, effective with the 2024-2025 season.

== Principal conductors and artistic directors ==
- Miguel Groba (1987–2000)
- José Ramón Encinar (2000–2013)
- Víctor Pablo Pérez (2013–2021)
- Marzena Diakun (2021–2024)
- Alondra de la Parra (2024–present)

== See also ==
- Teatro de la Zarzuela
- Madrid Symphony Orchestra
- Spanish National Orchestra
- Queen Sofía Chamber Orchestra
- RTVE Symphony Orchestra
- Teatro Real
- National Auditorium of Music
- Teatro Monumental
- Joven Orquesta Nacional de España
- Zarzuela
