= José Cubiles =

Spanish pianist, conductor and teacher (1894–1971)

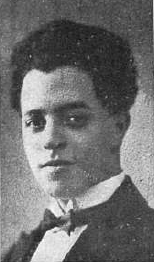

José Antonio Cubiles Ramos (15 May 1894 – 5 April 1971) was a noted Spanish pianist, conductor and teacher.

== Biography ==
Cubiles was born in Cádiz in 1894. His pianistic gifts were already apparent by the age of five. He first studied music theory and elementary piano with Rafaele Tomasetti, director of the Conservatory of Santa Cecilia (now known as the Real Conservatorio Profesional de Música de "Manuel de Falla" de Cádiz). From age 11, he studied at the Madrid Royal Conservatory, under the patronage of Princess Isabella of Bourbon, daughter of Queen Isabella II of Spain. His principal teacher there was Pilar Fernández de la Mora. At age 15 he won the Premio Extraordinario awarded by the Círculo de Bellas Artes. In 1911 he won the Conservatory's First Prize. He undertook further study at the Conservatoire de Paris with Louis Diémer, graduating in 1914 with another Premier Prix, a Gold Medal, and a Pleyel grand piano.

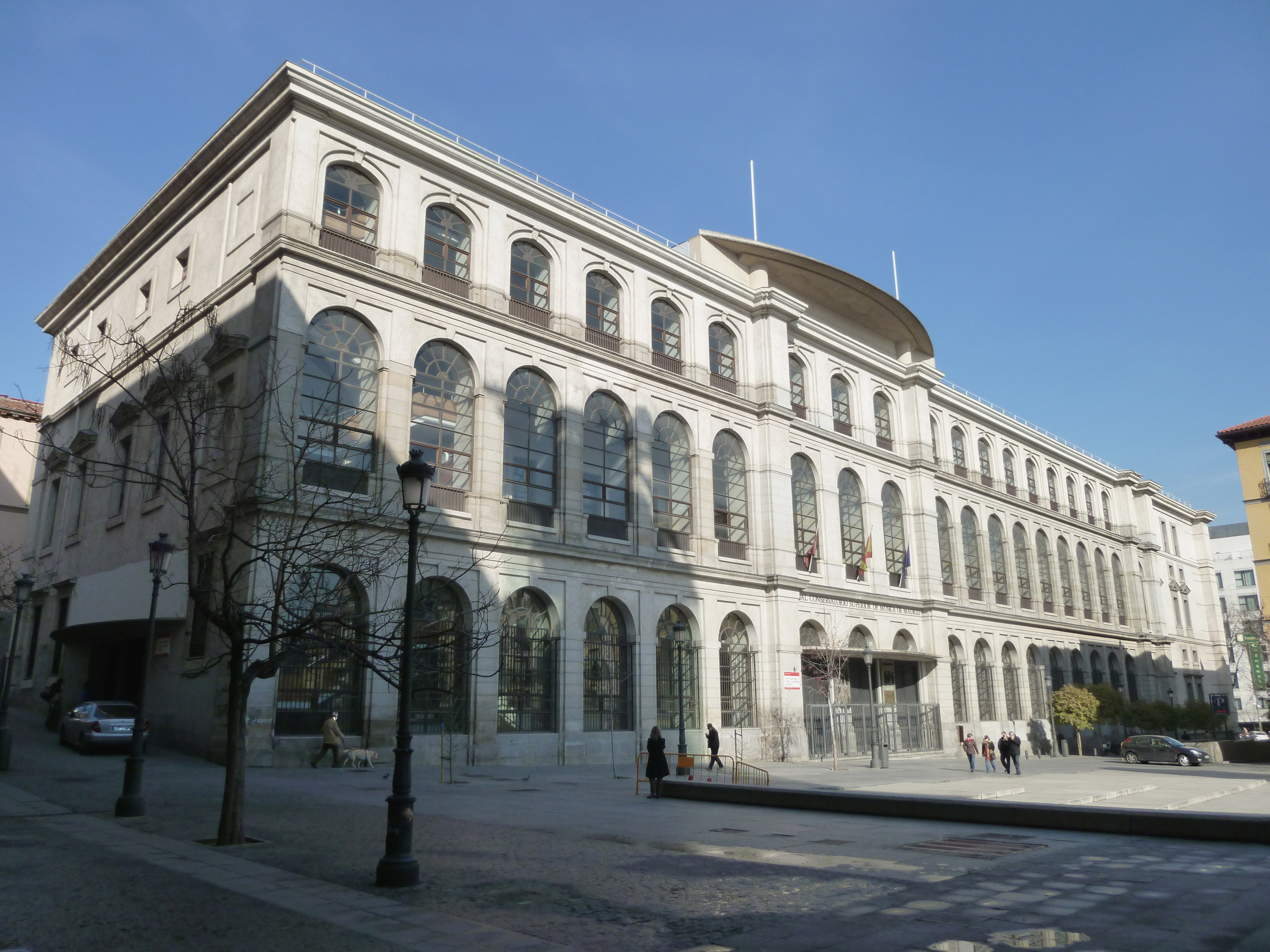
Madrid Royal Conservatory

In 1916 he was appointed a professor at his Madrid alma mater. That year he founded a chamber trio with the cellist Juan Ruiz Casaux and the violinist Fernández Ortiz. During the war years he accompanied the violinist Manuel Quiroga on tours of the United States and Canada. He also played in chamber ensembles with artists such as Jacques Thibaud, Paul Kochanski and Gaspar Cassadó, and was known for his performances of the music of the Spanish masters Isaac Albéniz, Enrique Granados, Joaquín Turina and Manuel de Falla, as well as Frédéric Chopin, César Franck, Claude Debussy and Maurice Ravel.

José Cubiles is best known outside Spain as the soloist in the world premiere performance of de Falla's composition for piano and orchestra, Nights in the Gardens of Spain, on 9 April 1916 with the Madrid Symphony Orchestra under Enrique Fernández Arbós, at the Teatro Real in Madrid. The work was dedicated to the pianist Ricardo Viñes, but de Falla chose Cubiles as a tribute to his exceptional qualities as a virtuoso and a musician. He later recorded the work with the Vienna Philharmonic under Ernest Ansermet.

On 6 June 1916, during Igor Stravinsky's first visit to Spain to present his ballets The Firebird and Petrushka, Cubiles played the difficult piano part in Petrushka in a performance conducted by Ansermet, in the presence of the composer, who had personally rehearsed the players. (Cubiles and Stravinsky died one day apart, on 5 and 6 April 1971 respectively.)

From 1920 Cubiles played with great success throughout Europe and Britain, giving solo recitals, and concerto performances under conductors such as Ernest Ansermet, Carl Schuricht and Paul Paray. He also conducted the Berlin Philharmonic on occasion. He also conducted the principal Spanish orchestras, and played all five Beethoven piano concertos with the Madrid Philharmonic Orchestra.

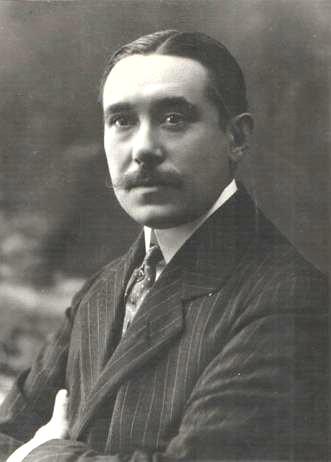
Joaquín Turina

On 16 November 1927 in Madrid, Cubiles introduced the original piano solo version of Ernesto Halffter's ballet Sonatina (containing the well-known "Danza de la Pastora"). It was later presented in a concert version with orchestra and a fully staged ballet (both in 1928).

He premiered most of Joaquín Turina's major works for solo piano. He was the dedicatee and gave the premiere of both sets of Cinco danzas gitanas (Opp. 55 and 84), on 15 January 1932 and 8 March 1935 respectively, in Madrid. He first played En el cortijo: Impresiones andaluzas (On the Farm: Impressions of Andalusia) on 2 February 1942, as part of a recital at the Real Academia de Bellas Artes de San Fernando. Rincón mágico (Magical Corner: Parade in sonata form), Op. 97 (1941–46) is a piece in which Turina paints the portraits of certain friends, including Cubiles, and himself. He characterises Cubiles as "Pepe, el pianista gaditano".

Cubiles became professor of advanced classes at the Madrid Royal Conservatory in 1926, and in 1943 became professor of the special virtuoso class. He was the head of the institution between 1962 and 1964. His students included Joaquín Achúcarro, Guillermo Gonzalez, Yüksel Koptagel and Rafael Orozco.

He was elected to the seat left vacant by the death of Enrique Fernández Arbós in the Royal Academy of Fine Arts of St Ferdinand. He was also a member of the Academy of Santa Isabel de Hungria in Seville, and the Hispano-American Academy in Cadiz.

In addition to Nights in the Gardens of Spain, Cubiles recorded numerous solo pieces, including works by Albéniz (the suite Iberia and other works) and Turina (Cinco danzas gitanas, Op. 55).

José Cubiles received the Grand Cross of the Civil Order of Alfonso X, the Wise and the French Legion of Honour. He died in Madrid in 1971, aged 76.
