= Josep Pons =

Spanish conductor (born 1957)

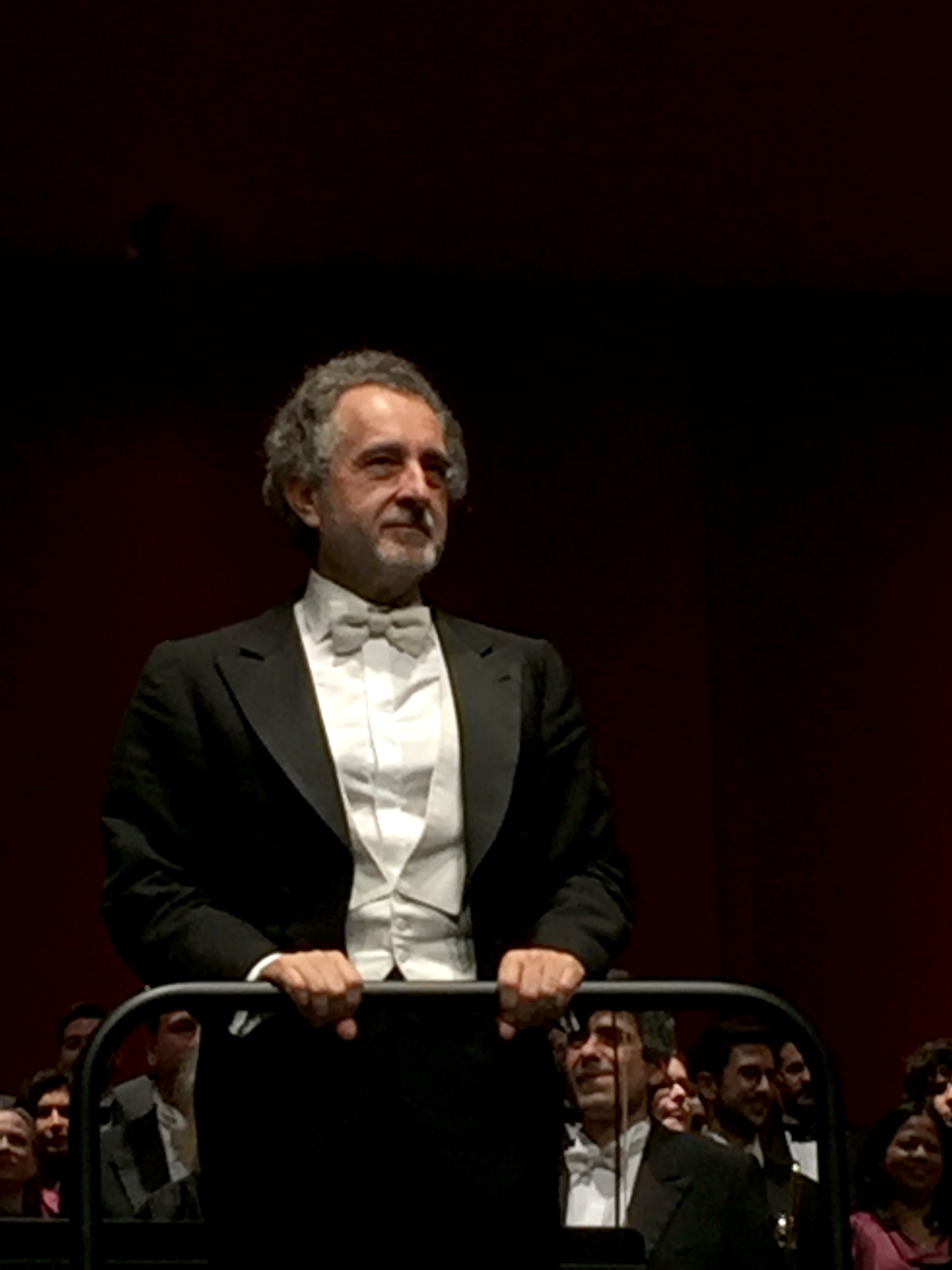
- Born: Josep Pons i Viladomat; 1957 (age 68–69); Puig-reig, Catalonia, Spain
- Occupation: Conductor
- Known for: Directing and conducting: Gran Teatre del Liceu; Spanish National Orchestra; City of Granada Orchestra; Chamber Orchestra of the Teatre Lliure
- Spouse: Virginia Parramon
- Children: 1

Josep Pons (born Josep Pons i Viladomat; 1957) is a Spanish conductor.

== Biography ==
Pons was born in Puig-reig, Berguedà. He received his musical training at L'Escolania de Montserrat and continued his musical studies in Barcelona with such teachers as Josep Soler i Sardà (composition) and Antoni Ros-Marbà (conducting).

In 1985, Pons founded the Orquestra de Cambra Teatre Lliure (Chamber Orchestra of the Teatre Lliure). He directed the Coral Càrmina from 1988 to 1990. He was the musical director for the 1992 Summer Olympics. Pons was the first artistic director of the Jove Orquestra Simfònica de Catalunya, later the Jove Orquestra Nacional de Catalunya, from 1993 to 2001. He was principal conductor of the City of Granada Orchestra (Orquesta Ciudad de Granada) from 1994 to 2004. In 2003, he became artistic director and principal conductor of the Spanish National Orchestra.

In October 2010, the Gran Teatre del Liceu announced the appointment of Pons as its next music director, as of September 2012, for an initial contract of 6 years. In November 2017, the Liceu announced the extension of Pons' contract through the 2021–2022 season. In July 2021, the Liceu announced a further extension of Pons' contract through the 2025–2026 season. Pons concluded his Liceu tenure at the close of the 2025–2026 season.

In January 2024, the Deutsche Radio Philharmonie Saarbrücken Kaiserslautern announced the appointment of Pons as its next chief conductor, effective with the 2025–2026 season.

Pons has conducted commercial recordings for such labels as harmonia mundi. His honours include the City of Barcelona Award (1992) of the Cultural Institute of the City Council and the National Prize for Music (1999) granted by the Ministry of Culture.

Cultural offices
Preceded by Juan de Udaeta	Principal Conductor, Orquesta Ciudad de Granada; 1994–2004	Succeeded by Jean-Jacques Kantorow
Preceded by Michael Boder	Music Director, Gran Teatre del Liceu; 2012–2026	Succeeded by Jonathan Nott
Preceded by Pietari Inkinen	Chief Conductor, Deutsche Radio Philharmonie Saarbrücken Kaiserslautern; 2025–present	Succeeded by incumbent
