= Orquesta Sinfónica de Madrid =

Spanish symphony orchestra

Orquesta Sinfónica de Madrid (OSM)
- Orchestra
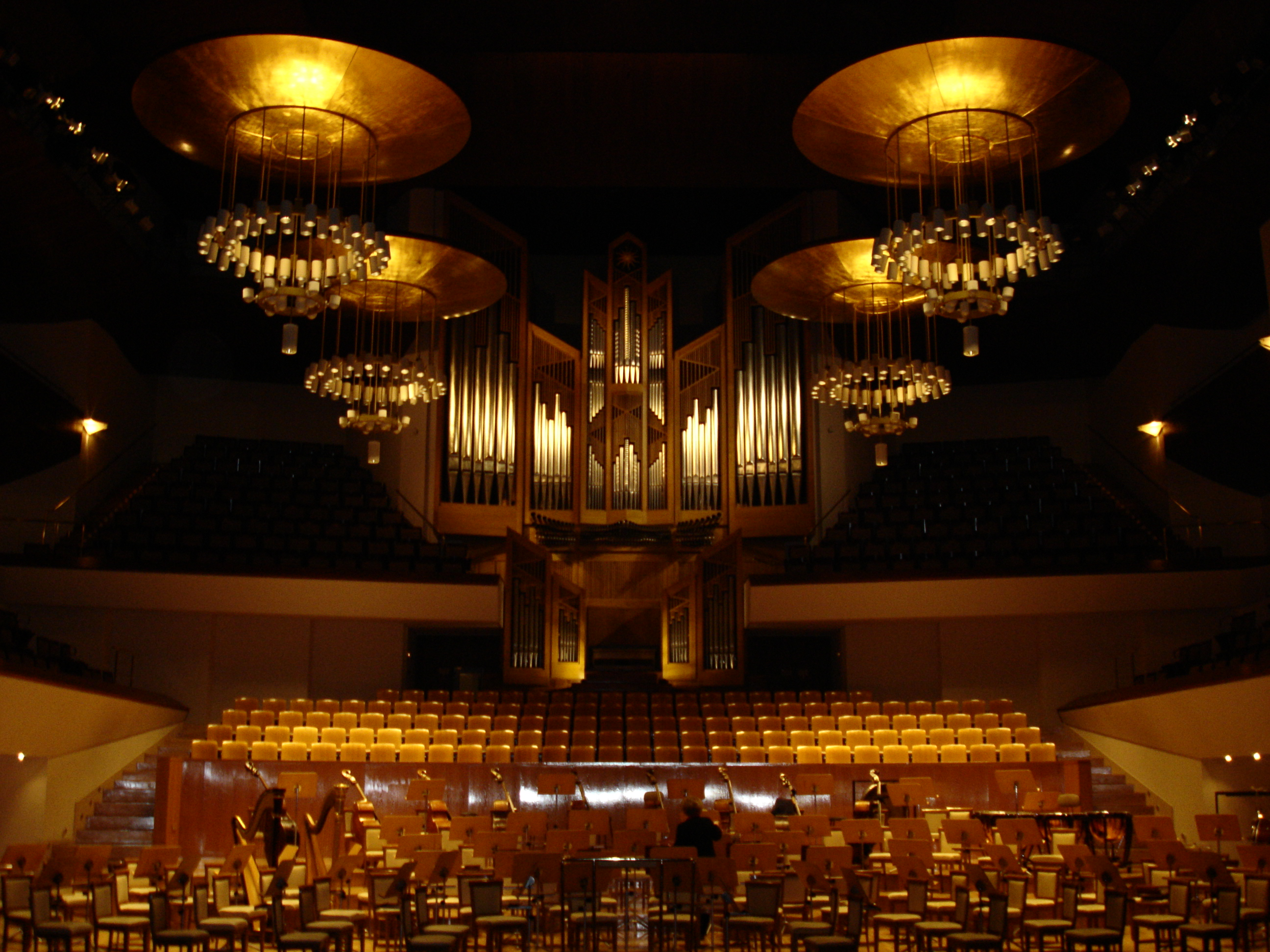
- Auditorio Nacional de Música (Madrid)
- Founded: 1903
- Website: www.osm.es

The Orquesta Sinfónica de Madrid (unofficial English name, Madrid Symphony Orchestra), founded in 1903, is a Spanish symphony orchestra. Since 1998, it has been the principal orchestra of the Teatro Real.

== Background and history ==
In 1903, the orchestra of the Sociedad de Conciertos de Madrid, which had been founded in 1866 by Francisco Asenjo Barbieri, was gripped by a crisis due to financial difficulties and irreconcilable disagreements between its section leaders. Some of the players decided to regroup in a new ensemble, which would assume the role of the Sociedad in organizing symphonic concerts and thus keep the classical music scene alive in Madrid.

The idea of a new orchestra in the city was conceived initially at the house of the violinist José del Hierro, who enjoyed the support of the two companions with whom he regularly played chamber music on tour, violist Julio Francés and cellist Víctor Mirecki Larramat. Their meeting was joined by two members of the Capilla Real, flautist Francisco González and clarinetist Miguel Yuste. After a concerted campaign to win over their colleagues in the Sociedad, eighty per cent of the original orchestra joined the new ensemble proposed by Hierro. As a large number of the section leaders were also professors at the Madrid Royal Conservatory, the group managed to recruit young talents quickly to its vacant posts.

The musicians held their first meeting in the rehearsal hall of the Teatro Real in December 1903, during which they decided on the name Orquesta Sinfónica de Madrid. The orchestra was constituted as a private, autonomous company of musicians, which would rely initially on its members to supply the setup funds for its operations (including the purchase of furniture and hiring of rehearsal halls and scores). Subsequently, however, the orchestra would support itself solely with earnings from concerts and recordings. It would avoid any dependence on external agents, whether public or private, who might intervene in its operations and impose conditions on its members, a misfortune which had befallen the defunct Sociedad.

=== The first season ===
Through the contacts of Hierro and Mirecki, the orchestra secured the agreement of the Spanish conductor, Alonso Cordelás, to lead the ensemble. Cordelás resigned his post in Munich and headed for Madrid, bringing with him the scores for the orchestra's first concerts.

On February 7, 1904, under the direction of Cordelás, the orchestra gave its first public concert at the Teatro Real and presented the following program:

- Overture to Don Giovanni, by Mozart;
- In the Steppes of Central Asia, by Borodin;
- Paraphrase on Wagner's Prize Song of the Master Singers for violin and orchestra, by August Wilhelmj (soloist: José del Hierro);
- Faust Overture, by Wagner;
- Romeo and Juliet, by Tchaikovsky;
- Symphony No. 4 in D minor by Schumann.

At the beginning, Cordelás sought to impose a break with Madrid custom by performing each concert in two parts separated by one interval, rather than in three parts, and playing in the afternoon at 3 p.m., instead of at night. By the third concert, Cordelás was forced to restore the two intervals, and by the sixth, the night schedule (8:45 p.m.) also made its return. However, Cordelás' problems had only just begun: he had confrontations firstly with the section leaders about rehearsals and the organization of concerts, and then with the hall owners about concert times, and finally had to face bad reviews and the rejection of his artistic choices by the public. These compelled him to resign at the end of the season, together with the founding concertmaster, José del Hierro.

The remaining concerts of the first season, which included the long-overdue Madrid premieres of Tchaikovsky's Fourth Symphony and Brahms' First Symphony, nonetheless won the favor of the public and rescued the fledgling orchestra from financial failure.

=== The Fernández Arbós era ===
After the departure of Cordelás, Enrique Fernández Arbós, a violinist and conductor, took over the orchestra. He was instrumental in totally restructuring the organization and presenting its new face in a major concert on April 16, 1905.

Fernández Arbós' leadership was uninterrupted for over thirty years. During his tenure, the orchestra determined its artistic priorities (above all, the promotion of Spanish composers and soloists), found its particular sonorous style, and established the principles of musical outreach which enabled it to give educational concerts and attract new listeners: lower ticket prices, more seats, and frequent tours. The orchestra featured the work of almost all the Spanish composers who flourished during the first third of the 20th century. It succeeded in attracting some illustrious guest conductors from abroad, such as Igor Stravinsky and Richard Strauss, and gave two important world premieres: Falla's Nights in the Gardens of Spain with pianist José Cubiles, at the Teatro Real, April 9, 1916; and Prokofiev's Second Violin Concerto with violinist Robert Soetens and the composer himself in the audience at the hall of the Teatro Monumental, December 1, 1935.

=== Period of crisis ===
The Spanish Civil War interrupted the orchestra's activities. The orchestra tried to stage concerts in besieged Madrid, but the number of available section leaders had shrunk drastically and those still in the city struggled to survive from day to day. The aftermath of the war marked the start of a long period of crisis for the orchestra, which began with the death of Fernández Arbós in June 1939, following the first concerts that year. To this blow was added the absence of the section leaders who had died during the Civil War or fled into exile after the victory of General Francisco Franco.

Finally, in 1940, the Spanish National Orchestra was formed, with its seat in Madrid, and drew away further players from the symphony, since it offered them the generous salaries of civil servants. Those who refused to leave did so out of loyalty or because they were "suspects" in the eyes of Franco's regime. The effects of the departure were especially dire for the string section, which could not fill vacancies easily for three reasons: the poor delivery of music education during the Second Spanish Republic; the loss of a large number of string players to the Civil War or exile; and the impossibility of recruiting European professors after the outbreak of World War II. However, in 1940, the appointment of Enrique Jordá provided the orchestra with some musical direction at least until 1945.

=== The orchestra in the pit ===
The activity of the orchestra changed radically in 1958, when it became the tenured orchestra of the Teatro de la Zarzuela and alternated its appearances between the pit and the stage. Its engagements during the late 1950s and early 1960s were almost ceaseless, as it embarked on various tours throughout Spain and abroad, especially to Portugal and Latin America.

In 1965, the formation of another new orchestra based in the capital, the Orquesta Sinfónica de RTVE, came once more at a cost to the ranks of the Madrid Symphony. During the 1970s, the Symphony's activity was tied closely to the needs of the Teatro de la Zarzuela. It took advantage of this niche, however, when it contracted with the company Hispavox to record a large number of zarzuelas and Spanish operas. The resulting recordings were invaluable not only for their quality but also because this was the first time that Spanish stage music had been welcomed without major inhibitions. The orchestra participated in all the productions at the Teatro de la Zarzuela, most notably in the television series Antología de la Zarzuela (1971) directed by José Tamayo. In contrast, the number of symphonic concerts it offered during these years fell greatly, and took place, in the majority of cases, in second-rate venues. This situation influenced the decision of many aging, long-standing players, who were receiving low pay in comparison with their intense work, to retire. Filling the vacancies posed a major problem and consequently the musical quality of the orchestra suffered.

=== Renaissance ===
During the Spanish transition to democracy after Franco's death in 1975, the then Minister of Culture, Soledad Becerril, offered the orchestra a contract which would grant it exclusive rights to serve the Teatro de la Zarzuela in performances of operas, ballets, and zarzuelas. The orchestra was recommended for this role by its institutional stability, experience, historical renown, and location in Madrid. The contract was signed in July 1981. To suit the interests of the Teatro de la Zarzuela, the orchestra underwent gradual restructuring to regain its quality.

The opening of the Auditorio Nacional de Música in Madrid promised the orchestra new prospects, especially in symphonic performance. This ideal was maintained after it signed a new contract, this time with the Community of Madrid, to provide annual cycles of concerts in the new Auditorium. In 1997, the orchestra moved out of the Teatro de la Zarzuela to take up residence at the Teatro Real, which had been reopened recently by the Community. This contract will run until 2009.

In 1999, the orchestra made several new appointments in the posts of principal conductor, Luis Antonio García Navarro, honorary conductor, Kurt Sanderling, and composer associate, Cristóbal Halffter. At the instigation of the Fundación Teatro Lírico, a choir attached to the orchestra and conducted by Martin Merry, was also formed.

Assured of a special position among Madrid's cultural institutions, the orchestra has now begun to develop an educational plan, with the creation of an "Orchestra School" under the direction of Andrés Zarzo.

From 2002, after the death of García Navarro, to 2010 the orchestra has been led by the musical conductor of the Teatro Real, Jesús López-Cobos.

== Principal conductors ==
- Alonso Cordelás 1903–1904
- Enrique Fernández Arbós 1905–1939
- Enrique Jordá 1940–1945
- Conrado del Campo 1946–1950
- José María Franco Bordóns 1951–1958
- Vicente Spiteri 1958–1977
- Luis Antonio García Navarro 1999–2001
- Jesús López-Cobos 2002–2010
- Ivor Bolton (2015–2025)
- Gustavo Gimeno (2025–present)

== See also ==
- Community of Madrid Orchestra
- Spanish National Orchestra
- RTVE Symphony Orchestra
- Queen Sofía Chamber Orchestra
- Teatro Real
- National Auditorium of Music
- Teatro Monumental
- Zarzuela
