= Jean-Paul Sevilla =

French musician

Jean-Paul Sevilla (born in 1934 in French Algeria) is a French pianist and musician of Spanish descent.

== Early years ==
He gave his first recital at the age of nine. At the age of fourteen he entered the Conservatoire de Paris, where he obtained the First Prize in piano, as well as a unanimous Prix d'honneur (which has not been awarded since). He also received the First Prize in chamber music.

== Middle years ==
In 1959, he was awarded unanimously the First Prize at the Geneva International Competition.

His numerous tours, as soloist and chamber musician, have taken him from Europe and Africa to both Americas and Asia.

Now a Canadian citizen as well, for more than twenty years, Jean-Paul Sevilla has lived in Ottawa, Ontario where he is now Professor Emeritus of the University of Ottawa, after being a full professor of piano, chamber music and piano literature at the University of Ottawa, while continuing his successful career as a concert pianist, lecturer and "clinician". He continues on numerous occasions to teach Opera at the university. Sevilla's presence in Ottawa has enriched the cultural and musical life of the city.

A gifted and enthusiastic teacher, he has taught and has been the mentor of talented artists, including world-renowned pianists Angela Hewitt and Guillermo Gonzalez, and chamber musician and professor of music, Andrew Tunis. He has given time and effort to promote music in Canada through the Canadian Music Competition and the Registered Music Teachers’ Association. He has also given thoughtful lessons to adult amateurs who remain his great friend. His musical and intellectual prowess has made him in high demand for courses, lectures and master classes alike. In addition, he has had many articles published in several musical journals in the United States. He is a noted expert on Fauré and Ravel whose complete works he has often performed.

In 1986, he was guest professor at the Musashino University in Tokyo, and has since returned every year to Asia, adding Korea, the Philippines, Indonesia and Hong Kong to his tours. In the coming year 2007, he will give concerts, teach and give master classes in Australia.

Jean-Paul Sevilla has directed summer courses in Europe (Aix en Provence, Perpignan, Toulon, Nice, Poitiers, Saint jean de Luz, Flaine, Courchevel) in Canada (Orford, Banff, Victoria) and in Korea. The courses in Aix and Perpignan were enriched by his close friends, the noted singing teacher and artist, Noémie Pérugia, and the highly regarded musician and pianist, Catherine Collard, both now deceased.

From 1997 to 2001, Jean-Paul Sevilla taught at the Schola Cantorum in Paris and from September to December 1999, he was guest Professor at the Oberlin (Ohio) Conservatory of Music.

He is regularly invited as a jury member at national and international competitions such as Munich, Lisbon, Porto, Cleveland, Marsala, Senigallia, Jaen, Orléans, Cagliari, Moscow, Leipzig as well as the Paris Conservatoire, The Pro Musicis Competition, Le Concours des Grands Amateurs, the Canada Art Council, the Canadian Music Competitions etc.

Jean-Paul Sevilla has released a C.D. featuring works of Vincent d'Indy and Albert Roussel and an album of two CDS "Homage to childhood" with works of Debussy, Prokovief, Ibert, Grovlez, and the world premiere of works by Pierné and Soulima Stravinsky. More recently, he has recorded works by Fauré in Japan and in France (Préludes op.103). A recent CD of the world premiere of Gabriel Pierné's Variations in C minor has just been awarded a Diapason d'Or, the highest award given by the French music magazine "Diapason". A new album including Fauré's complete Nocturnes has just been released and critically acclaimed.

Jean-Paul Sevilla is an Officer of the Order of Arts and Letters (France).
