= Lucas Macías Navarro =

Spanish musician (born 1978)

Lucas Macías
- Born: 11 August 1978 (age 48); Valverde del Camino, Huelva, Spain
- Citizenship: Spanish
- Occupations: Oboist, conductor

Lucas Macías Navarro (born in Valverde del Camino, Huelva, 11 August 1978) is a Spanish oboist and conductor. He was appointed artistic director of the City of Granada Orchestra in 2020, He is one of the small number of musicians who combine the role of oboe soloist and director, and has performed in this dual capacity in the 2024/25 season.

He is a former member of the Royal Concertgebouw Orchestra, where he served as principal oboe together with Alexei Ogrintchouk. He has also played with the Lucerne Festival Orchestra and the Orchestra Mozart.

He made his conducting debut in 2014. In 2018, he was appointed Chief Conductor of the Oviedo Filarmonía.
