= Iñigo Pírfano =

Spanish conductor (born 1973)

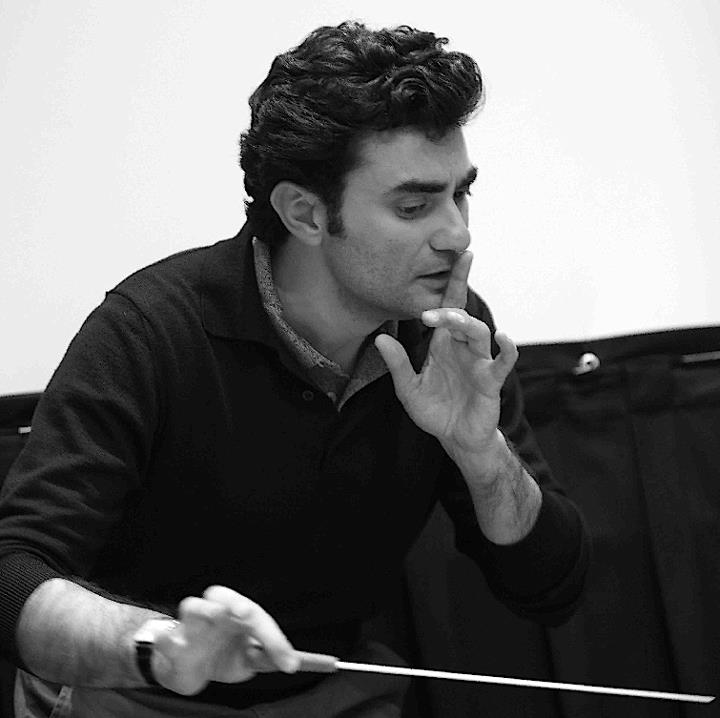
Íñigo Pírfano

Íñigo Pírfano is a Spanish conductor, born in Bilbao, Spain, in 1973.

== Life ==
=== Education ===
He studied musical theory, piano and harmony while reading for the BA degree in philosophy at the Complutense University of Madrid.

From September 1997, Pirfano studied at Mozarteum University in Salzburg (Austria) "Musikleitung" (orchestral, choral and operatic conducting) with Professor Karl Kamper; "Korrepetition" with Professor Wolfgang Niessner and Piano with Professor Karl Wagner. Finally, he took a Conducting Diploma at the Mozarteum, gaining an Auszeichnung, or distinction.

In June 1997, Pirfano conducted the Extraordinary Concert in the Schloss Frohnburg in Salzburg's Mozarteum concert hall. There, he interpreted works by Stravinsky and Falla and premiered works by young composers of the Mozarteum's 'Seminar für neue Musik'. He then attended a Masterclass with Sir Colin Davis in Dresden and with Karl-Heinz Bloemeke and Kurt Masur in Detmold, Germany.

=== Orchestral conductor ===
Pirfano's path as an orchestral conductor led him through Austria (Salzburg and Vienna), Germany, Poland and Spain, particularly the cities of Madrid, San Sebastián, Valencia, and Bilbao, where he conducted orchestras and chamber music groups such as the National Basque Orchestra, Bilbao Symphony Orchestra, Stettin Philharmonic Orchestra, Salzburger Frohnburg Ensemble, Dresdner Hochschulorchester Carl Maria von Weber, Orchestra of the Competition Jugend Musiziert (Germany), Orquestra Filharmónica de la Universitat de Valencia. He personally founded the Orquesta Académica de Madrid. In April 2002, he made his operatic debut with a production of Manuel de Falla's Retablo de Maese Pedro (Master Peter's Puppet Show), within the tribute given by the Spanish Institution Círculo de Bellas Artes to Miguel de Cervantes' character Don Quixote.

=== Composer ===
As a composer, in 1997, Pirfano composed, orchestrated and conducted the original soundtrack of the film El Sudor de los Ruiseñores, which won him a nomination for Best Original Musical Score given by the Spanish Institution of Film Writers, of the 1998 edition.

In 2000, he released Quatre Alcools for mezzo-soprano and orchestra in the Spanish Theatre of the 'Círculo de Bellas Artes' in Madrid. In 2012 he was commissioned to compose the Fandango de Don Quixote, the official musical theme for the 400th anniversary Don Quixote of the Mancha by the Spanish state-owned company "Don Quijote de la Mancha 2005".

=== Writer ===
Iñigo published his first book in May 2012, Ebrietas. El poder de la belleza

In 2013 he published his second book Inteligencia Musical'

== Awards ==
In 2012, Pirfano received the Young Leadership Award by the Spanish Fundación Rafael del Pino.

== See also ==
- Orquesta Académica de Madrid
