= Miguel Borrego =

Spanish violinist

Miguel Borrego (born in Madrid, 1971) is a Spanish violinist. He serves together with Mariana Todorova Roeva as the concertmaster of the RTVE Symphony Orchestra and is a member of the Arbós Trio.
