= City of Granada Orchestra =

Spanish orchestra based in Granada, Spain

Orquesta Ciudad de Granada
- Orchestra
- Founded: 1990
- Location: Granada, Spain
- Concert hall: Auditorio Manuel de Falla
- Website: www.orquestaciudadgranada.es

The Granada City Orchestra (in Spanish: Orquesta Ciudad de Granada, OCG) is a Spanish orchestra based in Granada, Spain. Its primary concert venue is the Auditorio Manuel de Falla.

The City of Granada and the provincial council of Andalusia founded the OCG in 1988 at the initiative of Patrick Meadows and Antonio Navarro, the Director of the Auditorio Manuel de Falla. Misha Rachlevsky was the founding director and artistic director. Juan de Udeata was the orchestra's principal conductor from 1990 to 1994. Subsequent principal conductors have been Josep Pons (1994–2004), Jean-Jacques Kantorow (2004–2008) and Andrea Marcon, a specialist in baroque music. Lucas Macías Navarro is the current artistic director.

The OCG has recorded commercially for such labels as harmonia mundi.

== Principal conductors ==
- Misha Rachlevsky (1988–1990)
- Juan de Udaeta (1990–1994)
- Josep Pons (1994–2004)
- Jean-Jacques Kantorow (2004–2008)
- Salvador Mas Conde (2008–2012)
- Andrea Marcon (2012–2020)
