= Nicolas Chumachenco =

Violinist

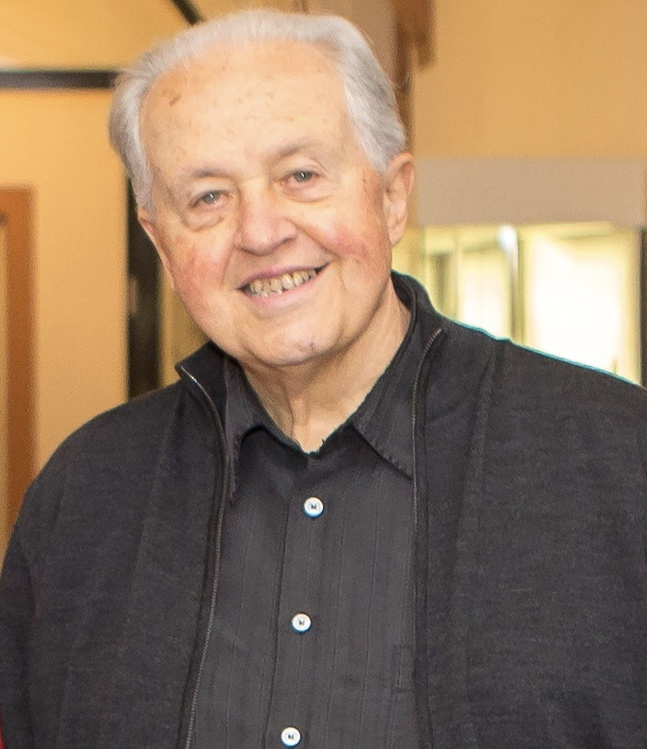
Portrait of Nicolas Chumachenco

Nicolas Chumachenco or Chumachenko (27 March 1944 – 12 December 2020) was a Polish-born violin soloist, professor, and director of the Queen Sofía Chamber Orchestra. He won the Merit Diploma Konex Award in 1999, as one of the best Bow Instrument Performer of that decade in Argentina.

== Biography ==
Chumachenco was born in Kraków, in Nazi-occupied Poland, to Ukrainian parents who left Poland at the end of the Second World War. He grew up and started his musical training in Argentina. Chumachenco left Argentina to study in the United States at the University of Southern California's Thornton School of Music with Jascha Heifetz and later at the Curtis Institute in Philadelphia with Efrem Zimbalist and won awards at the International Tchaikovsky Competition and the Queen Elisabeth Music Competition.

Chumachenco appeared as soloist with many orchestras conducted by artists such as Zubin Mehta, Wolfgang Sawallisch, Peter Maag, and Rudolf Kempe.

Chumachenco was first violin of the Zurich Quartet, professor of violin at the Hochschule für Musik Freiburg and served as leader and music director of the Queen Sofía Chamber Orchestra in Madrid.

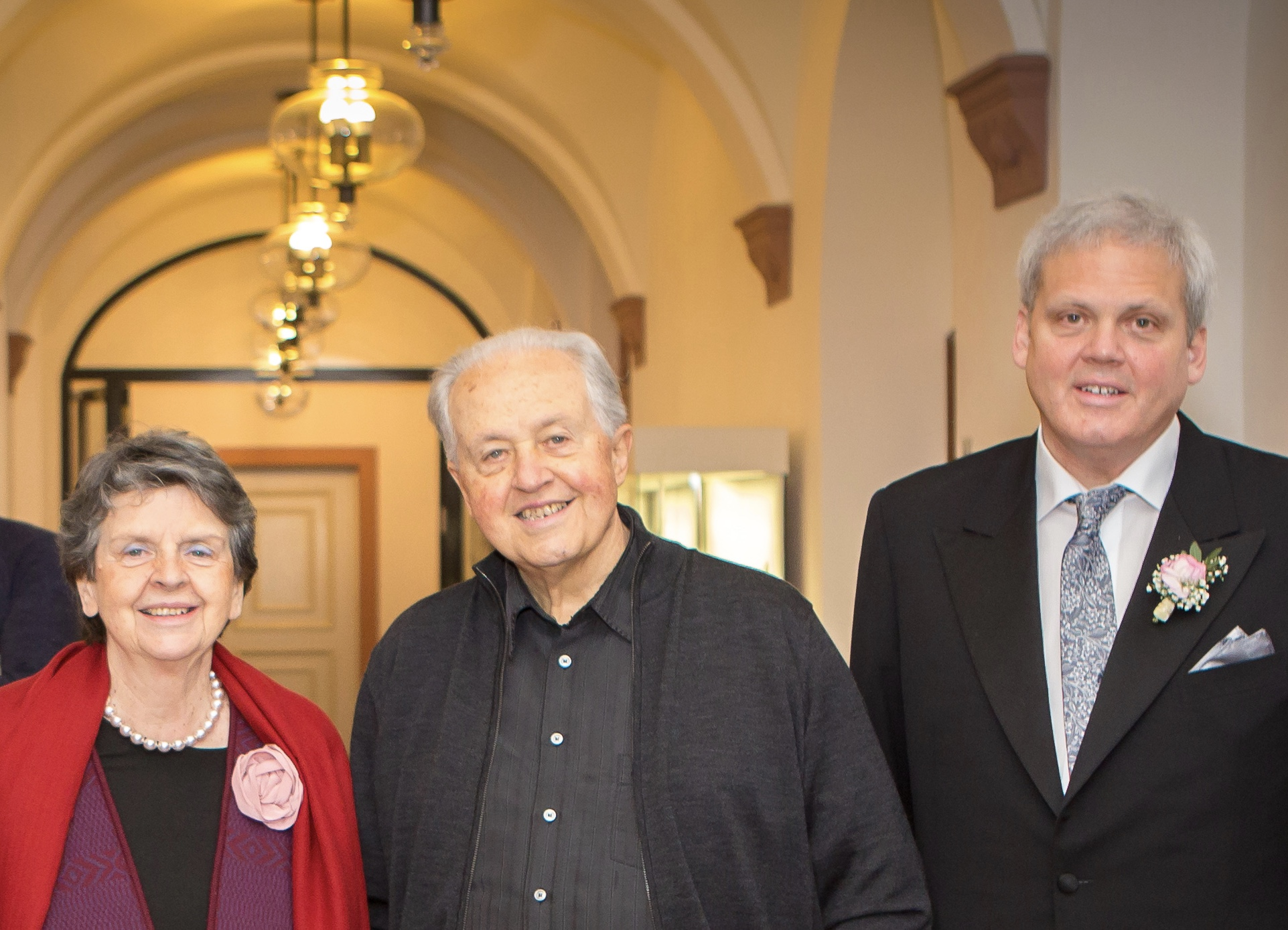
Ana (sister), Nicolas and Eric (son) Chumachenco in Würzburg, 14 February 2018. Photo by Tamara Hegedüs.

He died in Schallstadt, Germany.

== Family ==
His sister Ana Chumachenco (born 1945) is professor of violin at the Hochschule für Musik und Theater Munich. His son Eric Chumachenco (born 1964) is a classical pianist and holds a teaching position at the University Mozarteum Salzburg.
