= Angela Hewitt =

Canadian classical pianist

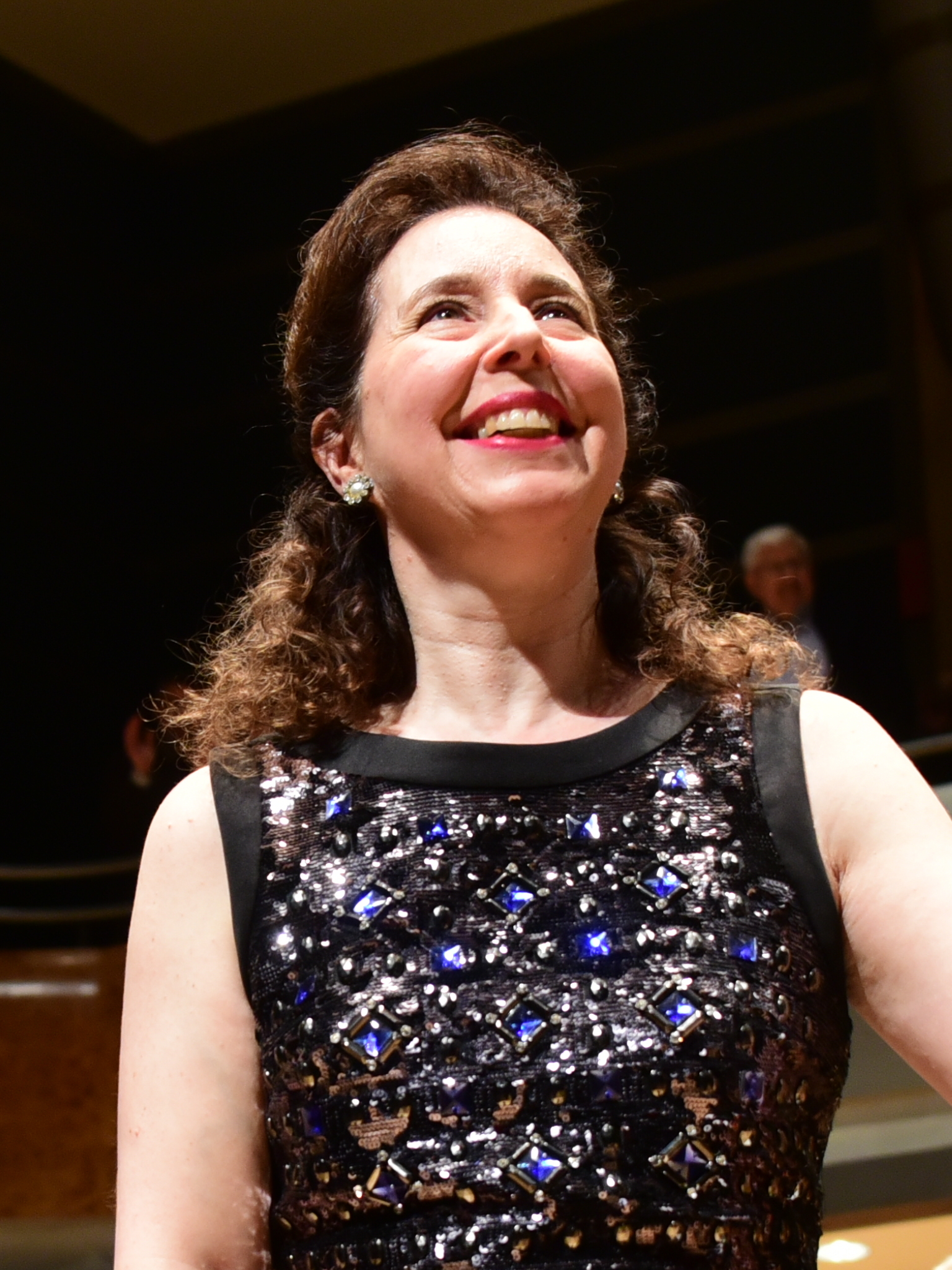
Angela Hewitt at a concert in 2017

Angela Hewitt CC OBE (born July 26, 1958) is a Canadian classical pianist. She is best known for her Bach interpretations.

== Career ==
Hewitt was born in Ottawa, Ontario, daughter of the Yorkshire-born Godfrey Hewitt (thus she also has British nationality), who was choirmaster at Christ Church Cathedral in Ottawa. She began piano studies at the age of three with her mother. She earned a scholarship at the age of five. She studied violin with Walter Prystawski, recorder with Wolfgang Grunsky, and ballet with Nesta Toumine in Ottawa. Her first full-length recital was at the age of nine, at the Royal Conservatory of Music in Toronto, where she studied from 1964 to 1973 with Earle Moss and Myrtle Guerrero. She then went on to be the student of French pianist Jean-Paul Sevilla at the University of Ottawa.

Hewitt has performed around the world in recital and as soloist with orchestra. She is best known for her cycle of J. S. Bach recordings which she began in 1994 and finished in 2005—covering all of the major keyboard works of Bach. Her recording of Bach's The Art of Fugue was released on October 17, 2014. Her discography also includes works by Francois Couperin, Jean-Philippe Rameau, Olivier Messiaen, Emmanuel Chabrier, Maurice Ravel, Robert Schumann, Ludwig van Beethoven, Frédéric Chopin, Claude Debussy and Gabriel Fauré. She has recorded two discs of Mozart concertos with the Orchestra da Camera di Mantova, and a third with Ottawa's National Arts Centre Orchestra, conducted by Hannu Lintu. With the DSO Berlin and Lintu, she also recorded the Schumann Piano Concerto.

Her entire 2007–08 season was devoted to complete performances of Bach's The Well-Tempered Clavier in major cities around the world. Her Hyperion DVD on Bach performance on the piano was released to coincide with the tour.

In July 2005, Hewitt launched the Trasimeno Music Festival in Perugia, Italy. She continues to serve as the festival's artistic director.

Hewitt switched to Fazioli pianos in 2002. Her unique four-pedal F278 Fazioli was dropped by instrument movers in January 2020 and considered unsalvageable by Paolo Fazioli, the company's founder. She chose a new Fazioli (out of five made available for her from which to choose) in January 2021.

== Recognition ==
In 1975, Hewitt won the Chopin Young Pianists' Competition in Buffalo, New York, and a Bach competition in Washington, D.C. In 1979, she won third prize in the Robert Casadesus International Piano Competition, since renamed the Cleveland International Piano Competition. In 1978, she won piano division in the CBC Radio Competition and in 1980 the Dino Ciani Competition in Milan, Italy. The same year, she won an honorable mention at the X International Chopin Piano Competition in Warsaw. In 1985, she won first prize in the Toronto International Bach Piano Competition, which led to a recording with Deutsche Grammophon. In 1986, she was named artist of the year by the Canadian Music Council.

In 2000, she was made an Officer of the Order of Canada (OC). In 2002, Hewitt was awarded the National Arts Centre Award, a companion award to the Governor General's Performing Arts Awards, given to an artist or group who has had an exceptional performance year.

Hewitt was named an Officer of the Order of the British Empire (OBE) on June 17, 2006, and Gramophone Artist of the Year in 2006. She received the MIDEM Classical Award for Instrumentalist of the Year in 2010 and was awarded the first-ever BBC Radio 3 Listener's Award (Royal Philharmonic Society Awards) in 2003. She is also a fellow of the Royal Society of Canada and has honorary degrees from the University of Ottawa, the University of Toronto, Queen's University (Kingston), The Open University (Milton Keynes, UK), Mount Saint Vincent University (Halifax), the University of Saskatchewan, and Carleton University (Ottawa).

On December 30, 2015, Hewitt was promoted to Companion of the Order of Canada, the highest grade of the honour.

== Personal life ==
After living in Paris from 1978 to 1985, Hewitt moved to London, which has been her principal residence ever since. In 2005, she was featured in BBC's Bach Christmas broadcasts.

== Selected discography ==
- Johann Sebastian Bach: Goldberg Variations (Hyperion Records, 2016)
- Maurice Ravel: The Complete Piano Works (Hyperion Records, 2002)
- Domenico Scarlatti: Sonatas (Hyperion Records, 2016)
- Franz Liszt: Piano Sonata & other works (Hyperion Records, 2015)
- Johann Sebastian Bach: The Art of Fugue (Hyperion Records, 2014)
- Johann Sebastian Bach: Flute Sonatas – with Andrea Oliva (flute) (Hyperion Records, 2013)
- Gabriel Fauré: Piano Music (Hyperion Records, 2013)
- Claude Debussy: Solo Piano Music (Hyperion Records, 2012)
- Johann Sebastian Bach: Angela Hewitt plays Bach (Hyperion Records, 2010)
