= Enrique García Asensio =

Spanish conductor

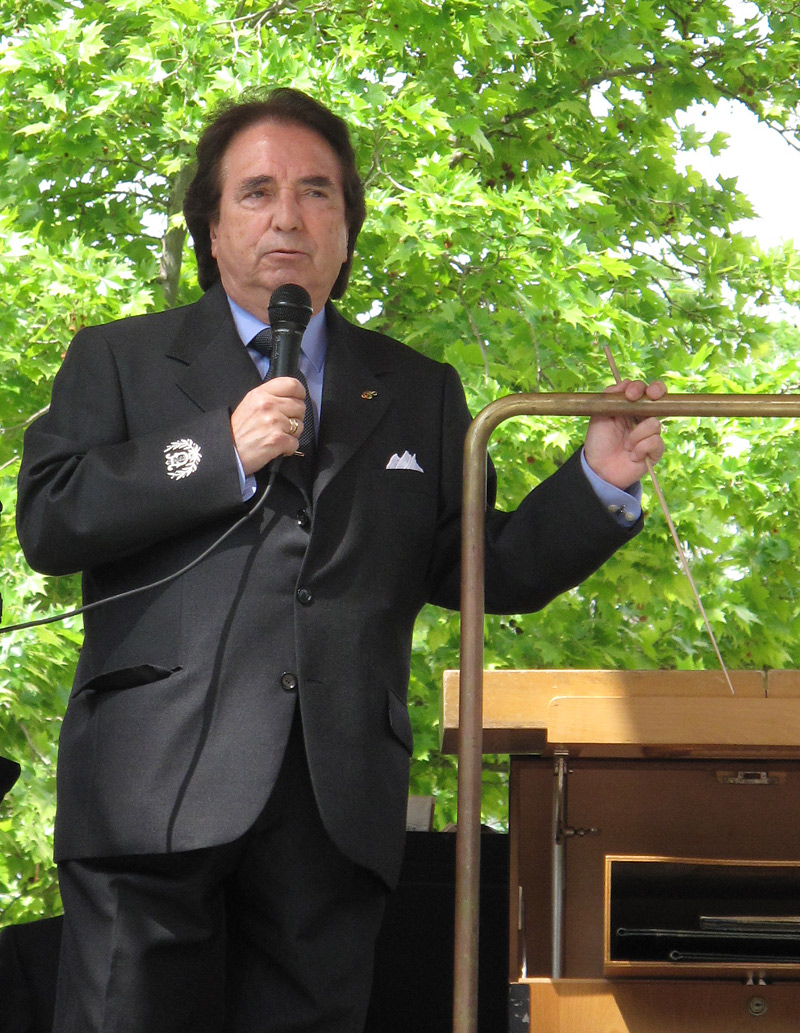

Background information
- Born: 22 August 1937 (age 87)
- Origin: Valencia, Spain
- Genres: Classical music
- Occupation(s): Violinist, composer and conductor
- Instrument: Violin
- Years active: 1966-present
- Website: http://www.garciaasensio.com

Enrique García Asensio (born 22 August 1937 in Valencia, Spain) is a Spanish violinist, composer and conductor.

In 1970, He was made as Professor of Orchestral Conducting at the Madrid Royal Conservatory. Asensio was also the conductor of the Spanish Radio and Television Symphony Orchestra (RTVE) from 1966 to 1984 and from 1998 to 2001.

In 1997, due to a Spanish law that prohibited holding two positions financed with public funds simultaneously (professor at the Madrid Royal Conservatory and conductor of the RTVE orchestra in his case), Asensio resigned from his position as professor of the Madrid Royal Conservatory. In 1999, he conducted the Euskadi Symphony Orchestra at the 38th edition of the Week of Religious Music in Cuenca. In 2000, he conducted the RTVE Orchestra for the reopening of the remodeled Kursaal Centre (San Sebastián).

Enrique García Asensio was also Principal Conductor and Music Director of the Municipal Symphonic Band of Madrid. Until September 2012, when the Municipal Symphonic Band of Madrid announced that they were looking for a new conductor to replace Asensio who stepped down the following month after 16 years conducting the Band.

Cultural offices
Preceded by Antoni Ros-Marbà	Directors, RTVE Symphony Orchestra; 1965–1984	Succeeded by Odón Alonso
Preceded by Sergiu Comissiona	Directors, RTVE Symphony Orchestra; 1998–2001	Succeeded by Adrian Leaper
