= Christoph König =

German conductor

Christoph König (born in Dresden in 1968) is a German conductor.

== Biography ==
Raised in Dresden, the son of a flautist mother, König became a member of the Dresden Kreuzchor at age 9. From 1988 to 1993, he studied orchestral conducting at the Hochschule für Musik Carl Maria von Weber in Dresden. In 1993, he became a repetiteur at the Semperoper, Dresden. He gained additional conducting experiencer at the Wuppertal and Gelsenkirchen opera houses. From 2001 he worked as Erste Kapellmeister at the Bonn Opera / Beethovenhalle Orchestra.

From 2003 to 2006, König was chief conductor of the Malmö Symphony Orchestra. From 2008 to 2014, he was principal conductor of the Orquestra Sinfónica do Porto Casa da Música. He has served as principal guest conductor of the Orquesta Filarmonica de Gran Canaria.

In September 2010, König became music director and principal conductor of the Solistes Européens Luxembourg (SEL). With SEL, he has conducted commercial recordings for such labels as Naxos. His current SEL contract is through 2025. Effective with the 2023-2024 season, König became principal conductor of the RTVE Symphony Orchestra. König is scheduled to conclude his tenure with the RTVE Symphony Orchestra at the close of the 2025-2026 season.

König has recorded commercially for such labels as Daphne, BIS, Naxos, Hyperion, and Rubicon. Other recordings conducted by König have included Schönberg and Prokofiev (Romeo and Juliet), Saariaho and Sibelius (Symphony No. 2) with the Orquestra Sinfónica Casa da Música Porto (Ao Vivo).

König resides in Vienna. In private life, he has a pilot's licence.

Cultural offices
Preceded by Paavo Järvi	Chief Conductor, Malmö Symphony Orchestra; 2003–2006	Succeeded by Vassily Sinaisky
Preceded by Jack Martin Händler	Music Director, Solistes Européens Luxembourg; 2010–present	Succeeded by incumbent
Preceded by Pablo González	Principal Conductor, RTVE Symphony Orchestra; 2023–present	Succeeded by incumbent
