= Nights in the Gardens of Spain =

Composition for piano and orchestra by Manuel de Falla

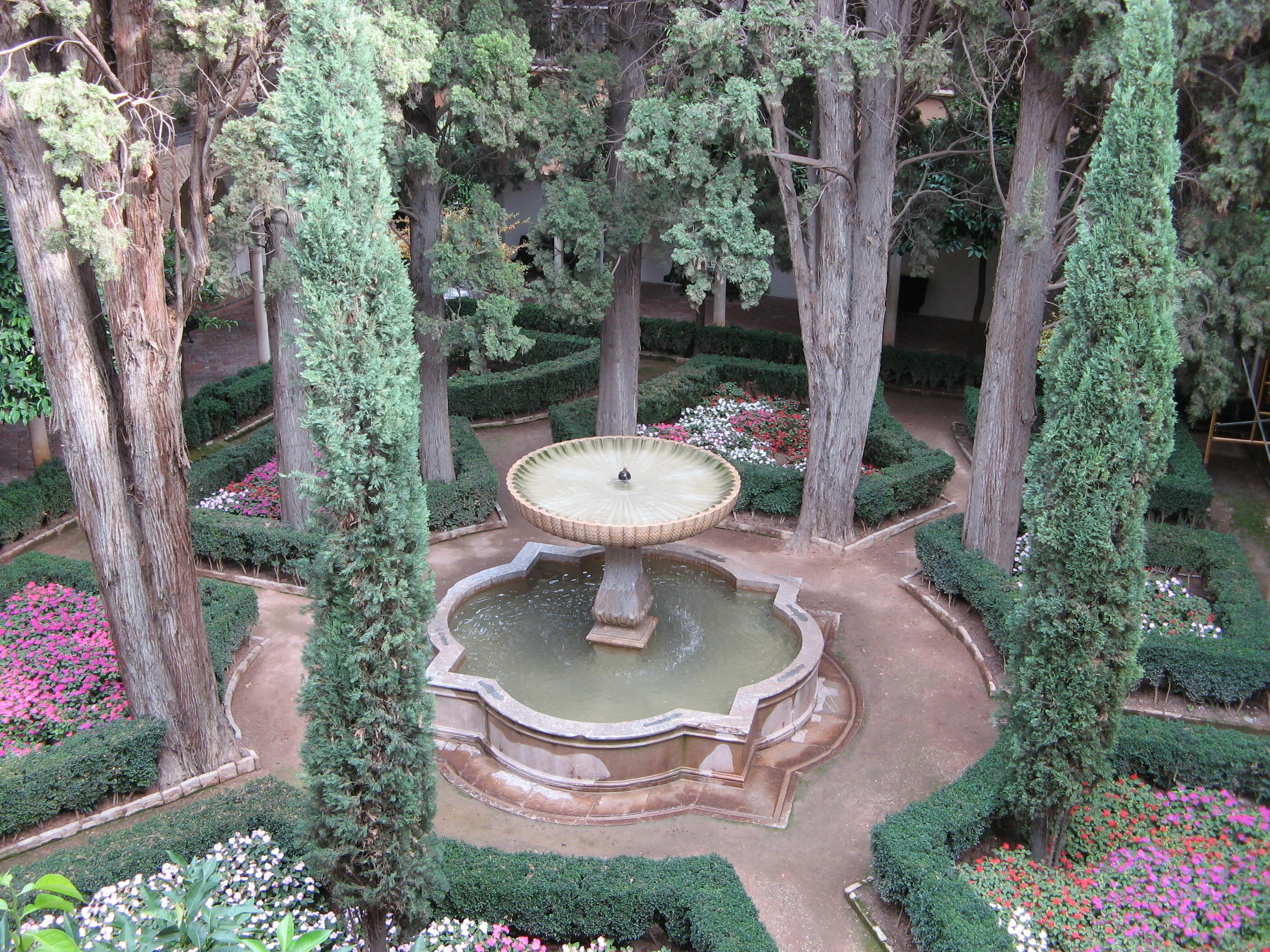
Garden at Alhambra

Nights in the Gardens of Spain (Spanish: Noches en los jardines de España), G. 49, is a piece of music by the Spanish composer Manuel de Falla. Falla was Andalusian and the work refers to the Hispano-Arabic past of this region (Al-Andalus).

In the years leading up to World War I Falla was living in Paris where he began this work as a set of nocturnes for solo piano in 1909. On the suggestion of the pianist Ricardo Viñes he turned the nocturnes into a piece for piano and orchestra. The influence of French composers such as Debussy and Ravel can be seen in the music. Falla returned to Spain when the war began, and completed the work in 1915. He dedicated it to Viñes.

== Notable performances ==
The pianist at the first performance was not Viñes, but rather José Cubiles. The first performance was given on April 9, 1916, at Madrid's Teatro Real, with the Orquesta Sinfónica de Madrid conducted by Enrique Fernández Arbós. Viñes first played the work in its San Sebastián premiere, shortly after the world premiere, with the same orchestra. Arthur Rubinstein was in the audience that night, and he introduced the work to Buenos Aires.

The Paris premiere took place in January 1920, with the pianist Joaquín Nin playing under Fernández Arbós. The composer himself was the soloist at the London premiere in 1921, at a Queen's Hall concert under the baton of Edward Clark. Other notable performers of the work include Alicia de Larrocha. De Larrocha recorded the work, for example with the London Philharmonic Orchestra in 1983.

== Structure ==
The work depicts three gardens:

1. En el Generalife (In the Generalife): The first gardens are in the Generalife, the jasmine-scented gardens surrounding the Alhambra. De Falla moved to Granada in the 1920s, but he was already influenced by the Alhambra. In particular, this movement has been seen as a response to Islamic geometric designs in its use of repeating patterns.
2. Danza lejana (A Distant Dance): The second garden is an unidentified distant one in which there is an exotic dance.
3. En los jardines de la Sierra de Córdoba (In the Gardens of the Sierra de Córdoba): The third set of gardens are in the Sierra de Córdoba.

Performances usually run in the range of 22 to 26 minutes.

== Orchestration ==
The work is flavoured with Spanish rhythms, but the score does not call for a guitar. It requires a piano, three flutes (one doubling piccolo), two oboes and English horn, two clarinets, two bassoons, four horns, two trumpets, three trombones and tuba, timpani, cymbals, triangle, celesta, harp, and strings.

The piano has an important solo part, but Falla did not describe the work as a concerto. It was first published by Max Eschig with the description "symphonic impressions" (the full title in French being Nuits dans les jardins d'Espagne: impressions symphoniques pour piano et orchestre). According to Roger Nichols, the piano is treated as an essentially decorative instrument.

== Publication ==
As well as publishing the full score, Max Eschig published an arrangement for two pianos.
