= Adrian Leaper =

English conductor

Adrian Leaper (born 1953) is an English conductor.

== Biography ==
Leaper studied horn and conducting at the Royal Academy of Music and for eight years was co-principal horn of the Philharmonia Orchestra. He was Principal Conductor of the Orquesta Filarmónica de Gran Canaria from 1994 until 2001, when he became conductor of the RTVE Symphony Orchestra in Madrid until 2010.

He has made many recordings for the Naxos Records label. He has conducted all four major London orchestras, the Moscow, Vienna and Prague Symphony Orchestras in addition to many other radio, philharmonic and symphony orchestras around the world.

Cultural offices
Preceded by Enrique García Asensio	Directors, RTVE Symphony Orchestra; 2001–	Succeeded by Carlos Kalmar
