= Jack Martin Händler =

Slovak musician (1947–2023)

Jack Martin Händler (30 August 1947 – 24 May 2023) was a Slovak conductor and violinist.

== Early life ==
Jack Martin Händler was born in Bratislava in 1947. He studied at the Conservatory of Bratislava, and subsequently continued his musical education at the Moscow Conservatory, where he was a student of David Oistrach.

== Career ==
Händler started his career as a violinist. Thereafter, he was active as a conductor. He emigrated to Germany in 1978.

In 1989, Händler founded the Solistes Européens Luxembourg, and served as its first artistic director until 2009. In 2008, the European Commission named him an ambassador for intercultural dialogue, and in 2009, an ambassador for innovation and creativity.

== Death ==
Händler died on 24 May 2023, at the age of 75.

Cultural offices
Preceded by no predecessor	Music Director, Solistes Européens Luxembourg; 1989–2009	Succeeded by Christoph König
