= Guillermo González (pianist) =

Spanish classical pianist

Guillermo González is a Spanish classical pianist.

== Career ==
Guillermo González studied music with José Cubiles, Vlado Perlemuter and Jean-Paul Sevilla at the Conservatory of Santa Cruz of Tenerife, then later in Madrid, at the Real Conservatorio Superior de Música, and in Paris, at the Schola Cantorum and the Conservatoire Superieur de Musique.

González has performed around the world, both as recitalist and soloist with orchestras such as the Orchestre Philarmonique de Strasbourg, Dresden Orchestra, Royal Liverpool Philharmonic Orchestra, Classic Chamber Orchestra of New York, Cámara de Stuttgart, Orquesta de Cámara de Escocia, Orquesta Nacional de España, Orquesta Sinfónica de Madrid, Orquesta de Radiotelevisión Española, and many others. He has also received a number of prestigious prizes, including, in 1991, the Premio Nacional de Música, the most prestigious prize awarded to musicians in Spain; the medal of the Village of Garachico 1996, and the Premio a la Interpretación Musical de la Fundación CEOE. In 2007, he received an honorary doctorate from the University of Granada, with the Albéniz Medal presented in 2009 in Camprodón, that composer's birthplace. González's popularity in his native Spain is such that several music schools have been named after him in the country.

González has championed and recorded a great deal of Spanish music, such as that of Isaac Albéniz and Manuel de Falla, but also works by Alexander Scriabin, Teobaldo Power and Ernesto Halffter. He has recorded for the Naxos, EMI, Etnos, Marco Polo labels and others.

González is a professor at the Conservatorio Superior de Madrid.
