= David Afkham =

German conductor

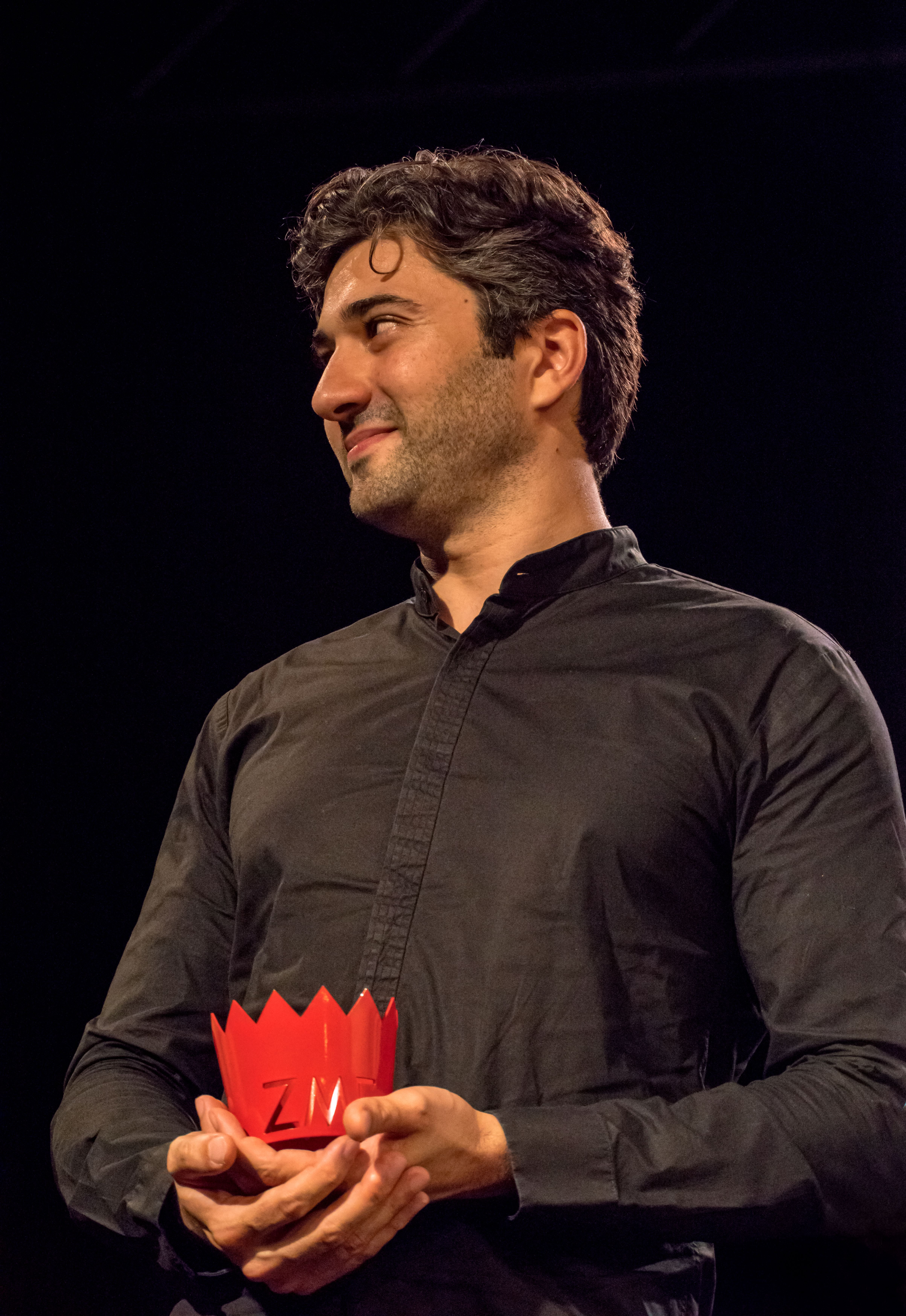
Zelt-Musik-Festival 2016 in Freiburg, Germany

David Afkham (born 1983) is a German conductor.

== Biography ==
Born in Freiburg im Breisgau, Germany, Afkham began violin and piano studies at age 6. At age 15, he studied at the Hochschule für Musik Freiburg, where he was a piano student of James Avery. In 2002, he won the Jugend musiziert competition. In 2007, he finished his conducting studies with Nicolás Pasquet at the Hochschule für Musik "Franz Liszt" in Weimar. One of his siblings is Micha Afkham, a violist with the Berlin Philharmonic.

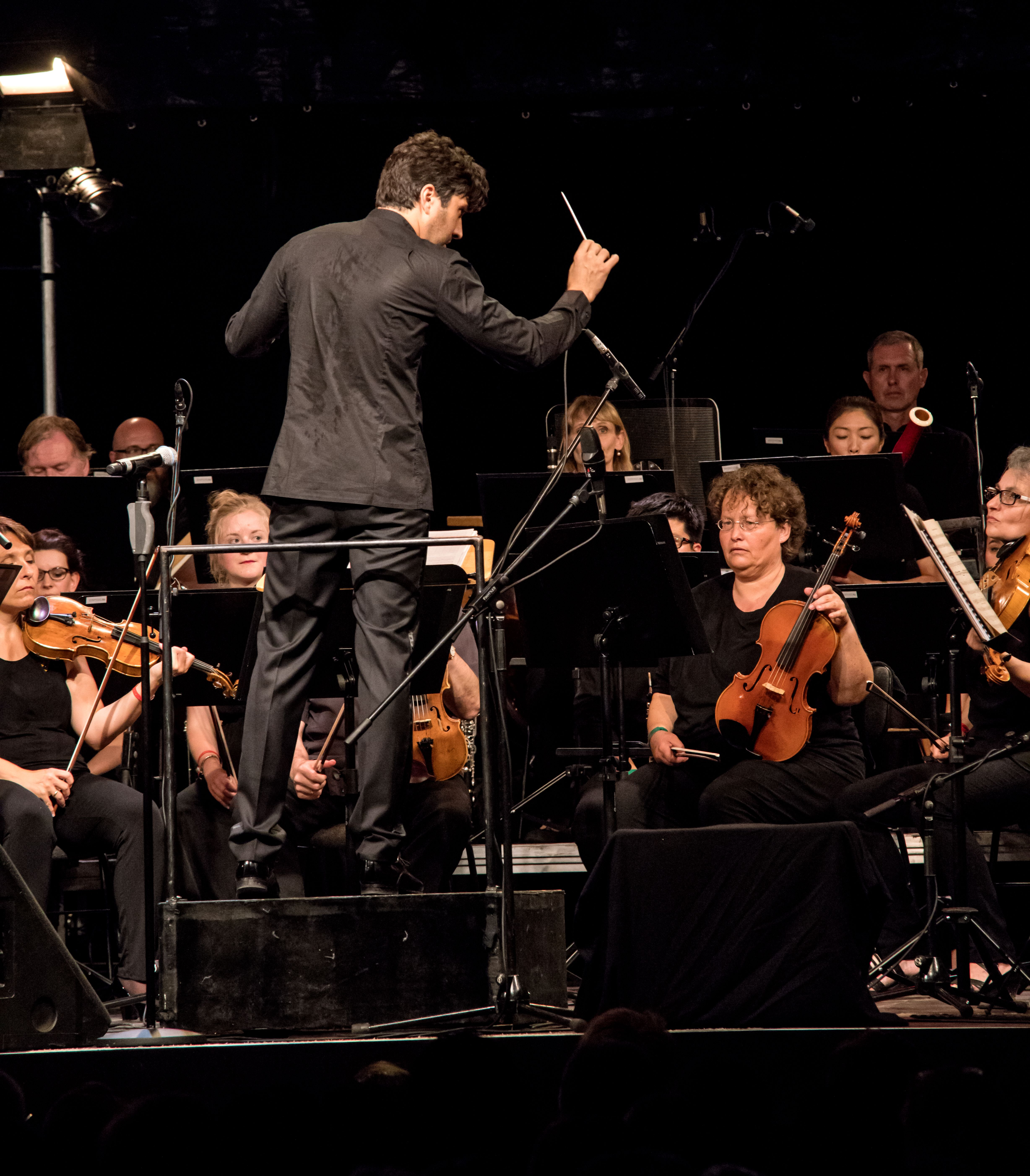
Afkham and the Freiburg Philharmonic Orchestra

He was Bernard Haitink's assistant and first scholarship recipient of the "Bernard Haitink Fund for Young Talent." In 2008, Afkham won the first prize of the Donatella Flick Conducting Competition, and subsequently became assistant conductor of the London Symphony Orchestra. From 2009 to 2012, he was assistant conductor of the Gustav Mahler Youth Orchestra.

In 2014, Afkham became principal conductor of the Orquesta Nacional de España (ONE), his first principal conductorship. In February 2019, the ONE announced the elevation of Afkham's title with the orchestra to chief conductor and artistic director of the Orquesta y Coro Nacional de España (OCNE), effective with the 2019–2020 season. In January 2023, the OCNE announced the extension of Afkham's contract through September 2026. Afkham concluded his tenure as chief conductor of the OCNE at the close of the 2025–2026 season, with the debut of both the ONE and Afkham at the BBC Proms in July 2026.

Afkham is married to the soprano Christiane Karg. The couple have two children. With Karg, Afkham has commercially recorded for such labels as Berlin Classics. For his services to music, Afkham was appointed Commander of the Civil Order of Alfonso X, the Wise in June 2026.
