= Odón Alonso =

Spanish conductor and composer (1925–2011)

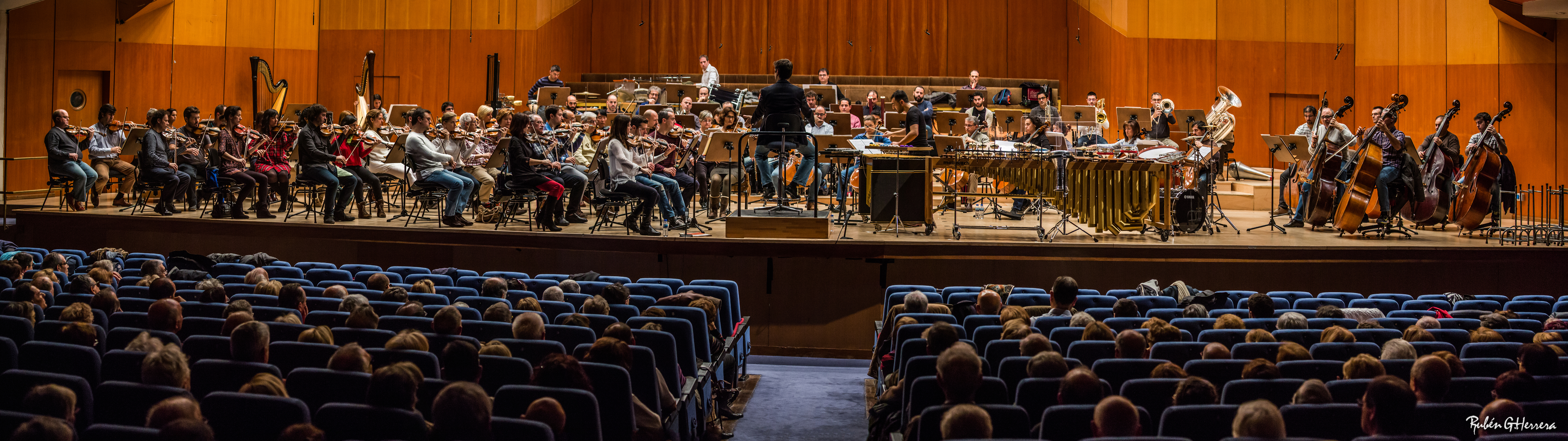
RTVE Symphony Orchestra.jpg

Odón Alonso Ordás (28 February 1925 – 21 February 2011) was a Spanish conductor and composer, best known for his film scores.

Alonso was born at La Bañeza, León, Spain. He studied in Madrid, Siena, Salzburg and Vienna. His first engagements as a conductor date back to the years between 1952 and 1956 when he was performing with the orchestra and chorus of the Spanish National Radio station. In 1960 he took on the position of principal conductor at the Philharmonic Orchestra of Madrid; between 1968 and 1984, Alonso was musical director of the Radio Symphony Orchestra of the Spanish Broadcasting (Orquesta Sinfónica de Radio Televisión Española). From 1986 until 1994 he conducted the Symphonic Orchestra of Puerto Rico. He died in Madrid.

== See also ==
- Himno a León

Cultural offices
Preceded by Enrique García Asensio	Directors, RTVE Symphony Orchestra; 1968–1984	Succeeded by Miguel Ángel Gómez Martínez
