= Queen Sofía Chamber Orchestra =

Professional chamber orchestra in Madrid, Spain

- Orchestra
- Founded: 1984
- Location: Madrid, Spain
- Website: www.focrs.es

The Queen Sofía Chamber Orchestra ( Orquesta de Cámara Reina Sofía in Spanish), founded in 1984, is a professional chamber orchestra based in Madrid, Spain.

== History ==
The Orchestra’s first performance took place at the Teatro Real in 1984 in a concert presided by the Queen Sofía. Since then the orchestra has performed virtually all the repertoire for string and chamber orchestra and performs often in Madrid at the National Auditorium of Music and other concert halls.

The orchestra has collaborated with soloists such as Alicia de Larrocha, Pepe Romero, Montserrat Caballé, Philippe Entremont, Nicanor Zabaleta, Joaquín Achúcarro, Henryk Szeryng, Yehudi Menuhin and Neville Marriner. The current leader and director is Nicolas Chumachenco.

The Queen Sofía Chamber Orchestra has often performed abroad in venues such as the Teatro alla Scala in Milan, Japan, Accademia Nazionale di Santa Cecilia in Rome and other venues in Zurich, Chile, Montevideo and Bern.

== See also ==
- Madrid Symphony Orchestra
- Spanish National Orchestra
- RTVE Symphony Orchestra
- Teatro Real
- Teatro Monumental
- Zarzuela
- Teatro de la Zarzuela
