= National Auditorium of Music =

Entertainment centre in Madrid, Spain

Coordinates: 40°26′45″N 3°40′39″W

- Auditorio Nacional de Música

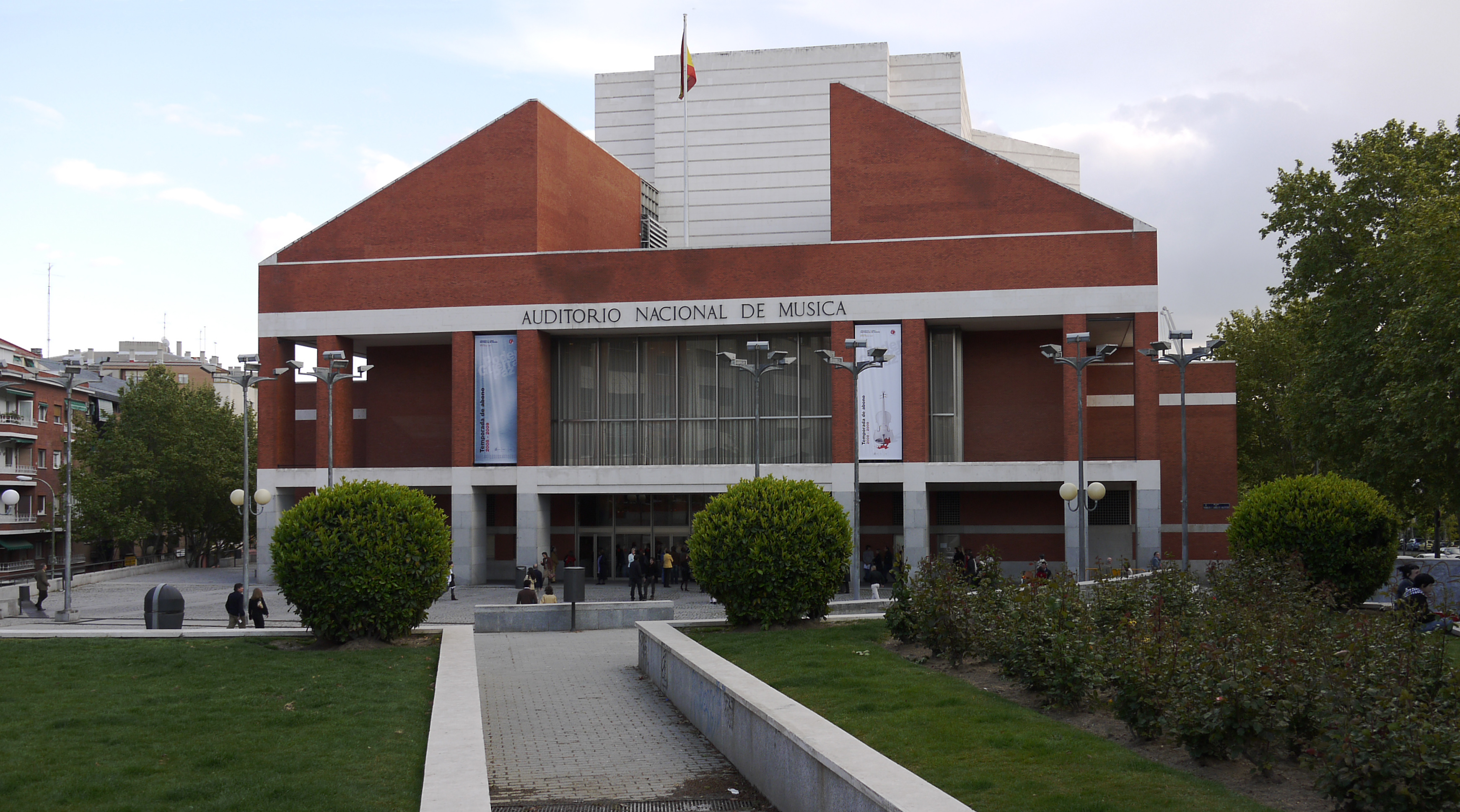
- Interactive map of National Auditorium of Music
- Address: Calle del Príncipe de Vergara, 146; Madrid, Spain
- Operator: INAEM
- Capacity: Symphonic Hall: 2,324; Chamber Hall: 692; General Choir Hall: 208
- Type: Concert hall

Construction
- Opened: October 21, 1988; 37 years ago
- Architect: José María García de Paredes

The Auditorio Nacional de Música (National Auditorium of Music) is a complex of concert venues located in Madrid, Spain and the main concert hall in the Madrid metropolitan area. It comprises two main concert rooms: a symphonic hall and a chamber music hall.

== Resident artists ==
The resident orchestra at Auditorio Nacional is the Orquesta Nacional de España, although it is also the main venue for the symphonic concerts of the Orquesta Sinfónica de Madrid and the Community of Madrid Orchestra.

The Auditorio Nacional is also the main venue for guest orchestras performing in Madrid.

== Facilities ==
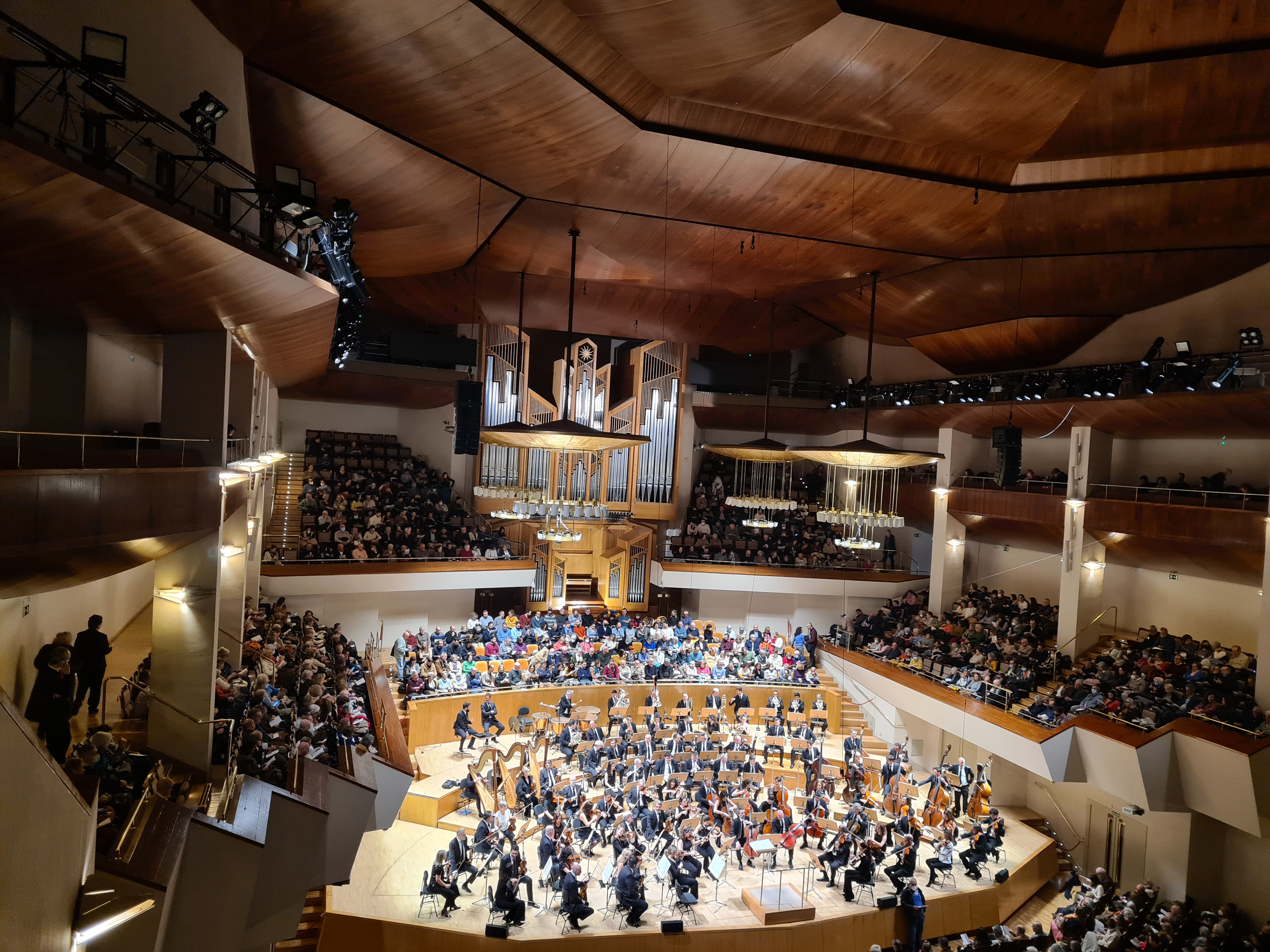
Interior of the main concert hall of the Auditorio Nacional de Música

The Auditorio's main concert hall is the Sala Sinfónica (Symphonic Hall) which seats 2,324. The seats in the Main Hall are situated around the concert stage, following the tradition of the modern European concert halls, in the "vineyard configuration”. The hall also houses a large pipe organ.

The smaller hall is the Sala de Cámara (Chamber Hall). This hall has 692 seats.

The Auditorio also has a small Sala General del Coro (General Choir Hall), with 208 seats, and several rehearsal and practice rooms.

== History ==
Before the construction of the Auditorio, Madrid did not have a proper and modern concert hall, and symphonic concerts usually happened at the Teatro Real and other theatres in Madrid.

The building was designed by the architect José María García de Paredes, and built as part of the Programa Nacional de Auditorios (National Auditoriums Program).

The Auditorio Nacional was inaugurated on October 21, 1988.

== See also ==
- Madrid Symphony Orchestra
- Community of Madrid Orchestra
- Spanish National Orchestra
- RTVE Symphony Orchestra
- Queen Sofía Chamber Orchestra
- Teatro Real
- Teatro Monumental
- Zarzuela
