= Robert Soetens =

French violinist (1897–1997)

- Born: 19 July 1897
- Died: 22 October 1997 (aged 100)
- Occupation: Violinist

Robert Soetens (19 July 1897 – 22 October 1997) was a French violinist, remembered particularly for premiering the Violin Concerto No. 2 of Sergei Prokofiev in 1935.

== Biography ==
Robert Soetens was born in Montluçon, France in 1897, into a musical family of Belgian origin. His father had been a student of Eugène Ysaÿe. He played in public at age seven, and at the age of 11 he also studied with Ysaÿe. At 13 he was admitted to the Paris Conservatoire, where he studied under Vincent d'Indy, Camille Chevillard and Lucien Capet.

At the age of 16, he played in the premiere of the First String Quartet of Darius Milhaud, a fellow student at the Conservatoire. He left the Conservatoire to enrol in the army during World War I. On his repatriation he became leader-soloist of an orchestra at Aix-les-Bains, and later with orchestras at Cannes (where André Messager was one of the conductors), Deauville, and Angers. He was also playing regularly in Paris, where he became friendly with other members of Les Six. In 1921 he married the soprano Maud Laury, but they soon separated.

In 1925 Soetens gave the first performance of Maurice Ravel's Tzigane (in the revised version for violin and piano), and then he went on a Scandinavian tour with Ravel.

For the next 60 years, Soetens was a travelling virtuoso. In Brussels, he came in contact with Sergei Prokofiev, who chose Soetens and Samuel Dushkin to premiere his Sonata for Two Violins in 1932. Prokofiev was so pleased with the performance of the Sonata that, because Dushkin had just received a Violin Concerto from Igor Stravinsky, he immediately wrote his Second Violin Concerto for Soetens, which was premiered in Madrid on 1 December 1935, under Enrique Fernández Arbós. Prokofiev gave Soetens a year's exclusive right to perform the work and the two then undertook a 40-concert tour in Europe and north Africa - an unusual occurrence since Prokofiev, as pianist, rarely shared a platform with another soloist. Soetens played the concerto many times, including the first two British performances (under Sir Henry J. Wood in 1936 and under the composer himself in 1938), and concluding with the first performance in South Africa in 1972.

In 1925, Soetens became leader of the Oslo Philharmonic, but continued to appear as a soloist throughout Europe. Hilding Rosenberg dedicated his Second Violin Sonata, Op. 32, to Soetens in 1926. He played in the premiere of Albert Roussel's Second Violin Sonata. Before his death, Roussel was also planning to write a Fantaisie for violin and orchestra for Soetens.

Soetens played frequently in London in the later 1920s and 1930s and appeared in other parts of the United Kingdom. He wrote a Violin Sonata of his own (performed 1934). In 1942 he accepted the chance of a tour in Spain, also acting as a sleeping agent for the Free French. Not being able to return without official German permission, he remained there until the end of the war, concertizing in Spain, Portugal and North Africa. After the war, he played in Egypt, Palestine, Lebanon, Turkey, and Bulgaria. In 1947–1950, he toured Africa, and appeared in Britain again in 1952-53 for a tour with the Scottish National Orchestra, and once more in 1957. The years 1960 to 1962 were spent mainly in South America, the next three in Asia, the next five in North America. In 1967-68 he taught at Oberlin College in Ohio. He formed a concert partnership with the Bulgarian pianist Minka Roustcheva in 1966, which lasted for almost 30 years. In his seventies, he played in South Africa, the Azores, Mauritius and Iran. In 1982 he gave masterclasses and concerts in London and Oxford. In 1983, aged 85, he performed Prokofiev's Sonata for Two Violins in a concert to commemorate the 30th anniversary of the composer's death. He gave a masterclass in Trondheim, Norway, in May 1992, two months before his 95th birthday.

He gave his last public concert in 1992, at the age of 95, and died on 22 October 1997, aged 100.

== Sources ==
- The Independent: Obituaries
- Faqs.org.homepage
