= Salvador Mas Conde =

Spanish classical music conductor (born 1951)

Salvador Mas i Conde (born 27 February 1951 in Barcelona) is a Spanish classical music conductor.

Born in Barcelona, the conductor Salvador Mas-Conde started his musical studies in Escolaria de Montserrat, continuing at the Conservatorio Superior Municipal de Música of Barcelona (CSMM), in Salzburg with Bruno Maderna, in Siena with Franco Ferrara, and at the Vienna University of Music and Dramatic Art with Hans Swarowsky and Günther Theuring. He has received awards from the FEV, the Austrian Ministry of Culture and in the Second International Hans Swarowsky Orchestra Conducting Competition in Vienna. His career brought a contract with the opera house of Mainz, and, from 1978 to 1981, appointment as principal conductor of the Barcelona Symphony and Catalonia National Orchestra, of which he has also been principal guest conductor. He has conducted all leading Spanish orchestras, as well as orchestras in Austria, Belgium, Canada, Israel, Japan, Mexico, Poland, Romania and Germany. Salvador Mas-Conde has been general music director (GMD) of the Würtemberg Philharmonic Orchestra (1985–1991), principal conductor of the Limburgs Symfonie Orkest (1988–1994), Musik Verein's Symphony Orchestra and Choir (1993–2000), Düsseldorfer Symphoniker (Germany, 1996–2000) and the Israel Chamber Orchestra (1998–2001). He has also been the leading guest conductor of the City of Granada Orchestra for ten years and from the 2008–2012 season its music and artistic director. He has been in charge of orchestral conducting studies at the Barcelona Conservatory and teaches orchestral conducting at the Wiener Meisterkurse in Vienna. He also held the position of Director ESMUC, Escola superior de música de Catalunya from 2005 to 2008.
