= Antoni Ros-Marbà =

Spanish conductor and composer

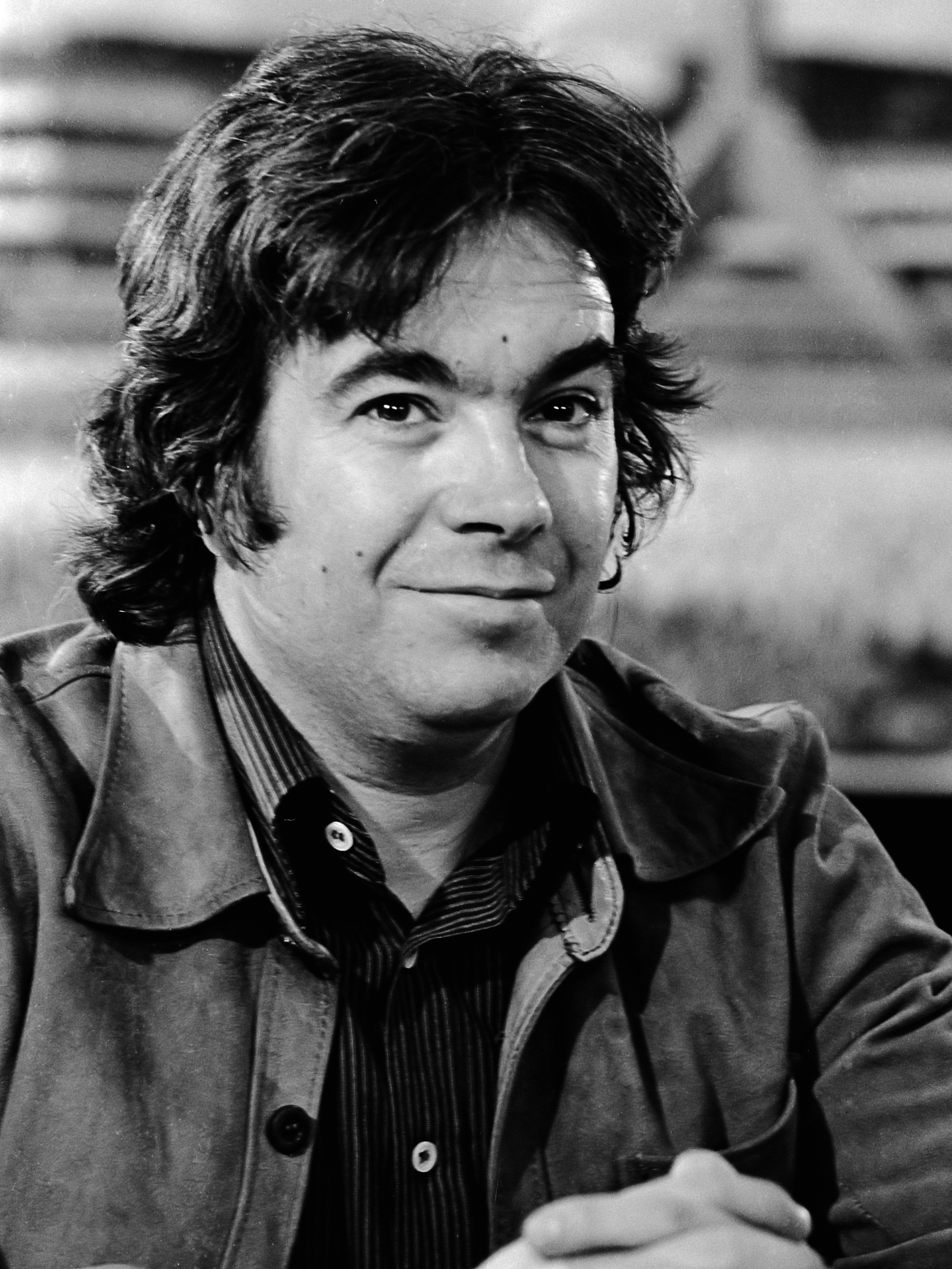
Antoni Ros-Marbà (1980)

Antoni Ros-Marbà (Catalan pronunciation: [ənˈtɔni ˈroz məɾˈβa]; born 1937 in L'Hospitalet de Llobregat) is a Spanish conductor and composer from Catalonia. He began his musical education at the Conservatori Superior de Música de Barcelona. He studied conducting with Eduard Toldrà, Sergiu Celibidache, and Jean Martinon.

He coached the last Giravolt de maig directed by Eduard Toldrà: "I worked directly with him. Accompanying the singers with piano, it was a wonderful moment", says Ros-Marbà. In 1992, he took part in the first theatrical performance of Robert Gerhard's only opera, La Dueña, at the Teatro de la Zarzuela and the Gran Teatre del Liceu.

In 1966, after the founding of the RTVE Symphony Orchestra in Madrid, Ros-Marbà won a conducting competition and was named the Principal Conductor of this orchestra. In 1967, he became Principal Conductor of the Orquestra Ciutat de Barcelona, until 1978, and again from 1981 to 1986. In 1978 he was named music director of the Spanish National Orchestra. From 1979 to 1986, he led the Netherlands Chamber Orchestra as Principal Conductor.

Between 2001 and 2002, Ros-Marbà worked with Mihai Amihalachioaie.

In 2005, on the National Day of Catalonia, he arranged a new version of the Catalonia national anthem, interpreted by the Orquestra Simfònica de Barcelona i Nacional de Catalunya and the Orfeó Català.

Ros-Marba conducted the Real Filharmonia de Galicia between 2001 and 2013, in Santiago de Compostela, Spain.

A selection of Antoni Ros-Marbà's scores is preserved in the Biblioteca de Catalunya. This selection includes scores from the time that Ros Marbà collaborated with Esbart Verdaguer.

Cultural offices
Preceded by none	Director, RTVE Symphony Orchestra; 1965–1967	Succeeded by Enrique García Asensio
Preceded by Rafael Ferrer	Principal Conductor, Orquestra Ciutat de Barcelona; 1967–1978	Succeeded by Salvador Mas
Preceded by Rafael Frühbeck de Burgos	Principal Conductor, Orquesta Nacional de España; 1978–1981	Succeeded by Jesús López-Cobos
Preceded by Szymon Goldberg	Principal Conductor, Netherlands Chamber Orchestra; 1979–1986	Succeeded by Hartmut Haenchen
Preceded by Salvador Mas	Principal Conductor, Orquestra Ciutat de Barcelona; 1981–1986	Succeeded by Franz-Paul Decker
