= Enrique Jordá =

Spanish-American conductor

Enrique Jordá (March 24, 1911 – March 18, 1996) was a Spanish-American conductor. Born in San Sebastián (Guipúzcoa, Spain), later on he was a naturalized US citizen.

After conducting in Madrid, Cape Town and Antwerp, he was music director of the San Francisco Symphony from 1954 to 1963. He made several stereophonic recordings in San Francisco for RCA Victor in 1957 and 1958. He made several highly acclaimed recordings for Decca in the late 1940s and early 1950s of Spanish music with the London Symphony Orchestra, National Symphony Orchestra and Paris Conservatoire Orchestra, including two recordings of Nights in The Gardens of Spain with Clifford Curzon as soloist. Several of these have been reissued on the Dutton label.

During his tenure in San Francisco he gave the world premiere of Joaquín Rodrigo's Fantasía para un gentilhombre with Andrés Segovia as the soloist. Jorda made recordings with both the San Francisco Symphony and the Symphony of the Air, several of which have recently been reissued on CD. His third recording of Nights in the Gardens of Spain was made with the San Francisco Orchestra with Arthur Rubinstein as soloist. His final recordings with the orchestra were for CRI in 1962.

After he left San Francisco, he was a guest conductor in Europe, South America and Australia. He published a book on conducting, "El Director de Orquesta Ante la Partitura," in 1969, and from 1970 to 1976 was the music director of the Antwerp Philharmonic Orchestra (now: Antwerp Symphony Orchestra).

During the San Francisco Symphony's 1973 European tour, the musicians were reunited with Jordá for the final time. Jordá died at 84 in Brussels, Belgium, following a two-month illness related to a blood transfusion.

His daughter Tessa, who married Sir David Brewer, has been awarded the OBE.
