= RTVE Symphony Orchestra =

- Radio orchestra
- Native name: Orquesta Sinfónica de Radio Televisión Española
- Founded: February 1965; 61 years ago
- Location: Madrid, Spain
- Concert hall: Teatro Monumental
- Principal conductor: Christoph König
- Website: https://www.rtve.es/orquesta-coro/

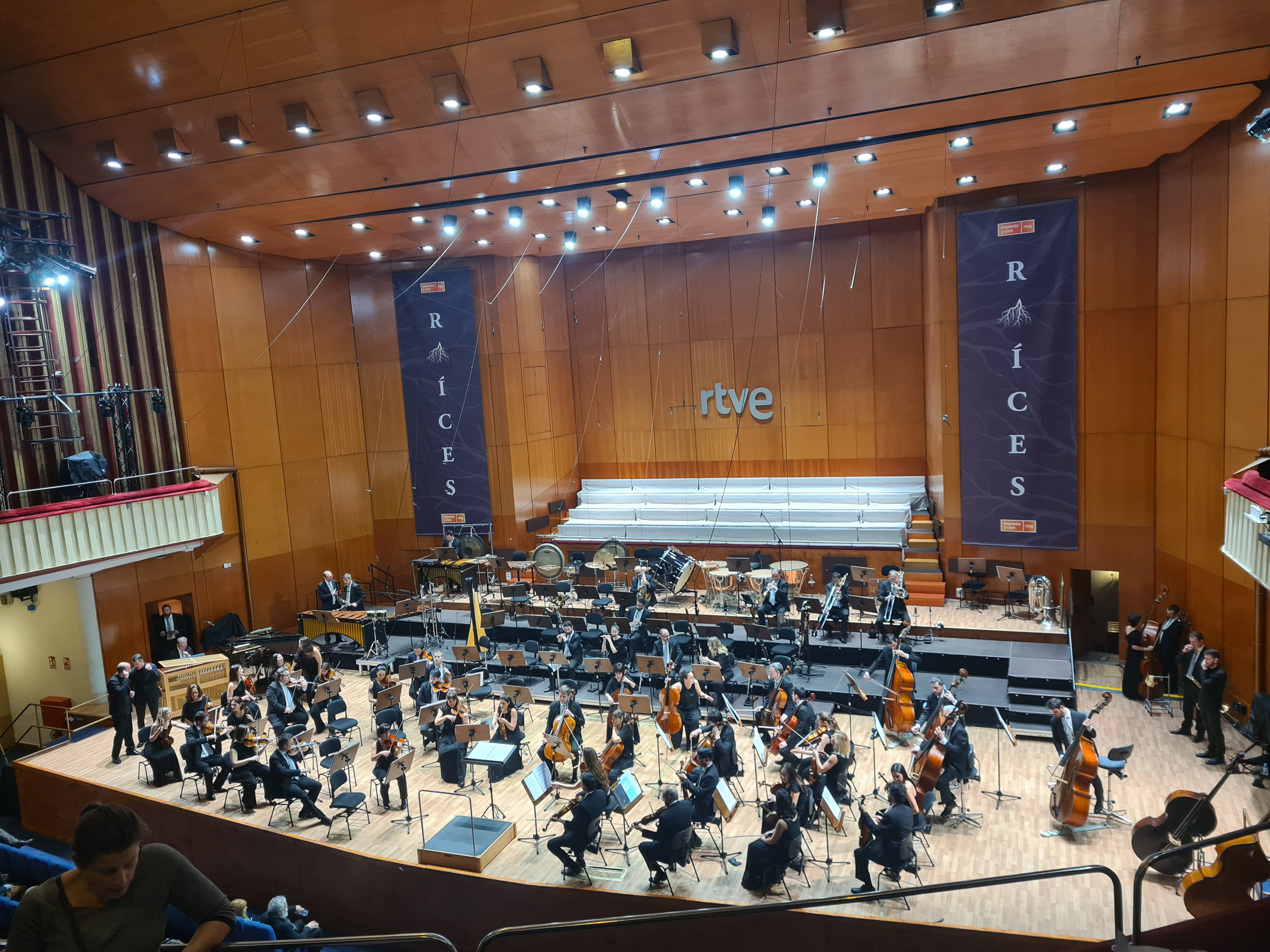
RTVE Symphony Orchestra at Teatro Monumental

The RTVE Symphony Orchestra (Orquesta Sinfónica de Radio Televisión Española), also known as the Spanish Radio and Television Symphony Orchestra, is a Spanish radio orchestra servicing Radiotelevisión Española (RTVE), the national broadcasting corporation. Established in February 1965, the orchestra is based at Teatro Monumental in Madrid since October 1988. Its entire regular season of concerts is broadcast on radio by Radio Clásica and television by La 2. The orchestra, along with the RTVE professional choir, forms one of the corporation's divisions.

== History ==
The orchestra was established in February 1965, with the purpose of serving both Radio Nacional de España and Televisión Española, as well as the Festivales de España. Its first concert occurred on 27 May 1965, conducted by Igor Markevich, at the Teatro de la Zarzuela in Madrid. The orchestra's first concert in Barcelona took place on 8 June 1965. At the beginning of the orchestra's history, Antoni Ros-Marbà and Enrique García Asensio served as co-principal conductors of the orchestra, from 1965 to 1967. Ros-Marbà stood down from his post in 1967. In 1968, Odón Alonso subsequently became co-principal conductor alongside Enrique García Asensio. Both conductors remained in the posts until 1984.

The orchestra's current principal conductor is Christoph König, as of the 2023–2024 season. In March 2024, the orchestra announced the appointment of Thomas Dausgaard as its next principal guest conductor, effective with the 2024–2025 season. Both König and Dausgaard are scheduled to stand down from their respective posts with the orchestra at the close of the 2025-2026 season.

In September 2025, the orchestra announced the appointments of Alexandre Bloch as its next principal conductor, and of Marc Korovitch as its next principal guest conductor, both effective with the 2026-2027 season. Korovitch currently serves as director of the RTVE Choir. Both appointments are with initial contracts of three seasons.

== Conductors ==
=== Principal conductors ===
- Antoni Ros-Marbà (1965–1967)
- Enrique García Asensio (1965–1984)
- Odón Alonso (1968–1984)
- Miguel Ángel Gómez Martínez (1984–1987)
- Arpad Joó (1988–1990)
- Sergiu Comissiona (1990–1998)
- Enrique García Asensio (1998–2001)
- Adrian Leaper (2001–2010)
- Carlos Kalmar (2011–2016)
- Miguel Ángel Gómez Martínez (2016–2019)
- Pablo González (2019–2023)
- Christoph König (2023–present)
- Alexandre Bloch (designate, effective autumn 2026)

=== Principal guest conductors (partial list) ===
- Miguel Ángel Gómez Martínez
- Antoni Ros-Marbà (1988–1991)
- David Shallon (1997–1999)
- Thomas Dausgaard (2024–present)
- Marc Korovitch (designate, effective autumn 2026)

== See also ==
- Community of Madrid Orchestra
- Madrid Symphony Orchestra
- Miguel Borrego, co-concertmaster
- Spanish National Orchestra
- Queen Sofía Chamber Orchestra
- Teatro Real
- National Auditorium of Music
- Teatro Monumental
- Zarzuela
