= Teatro Monumental =

Coordinates: 40°24′45″N 3°41′56″W

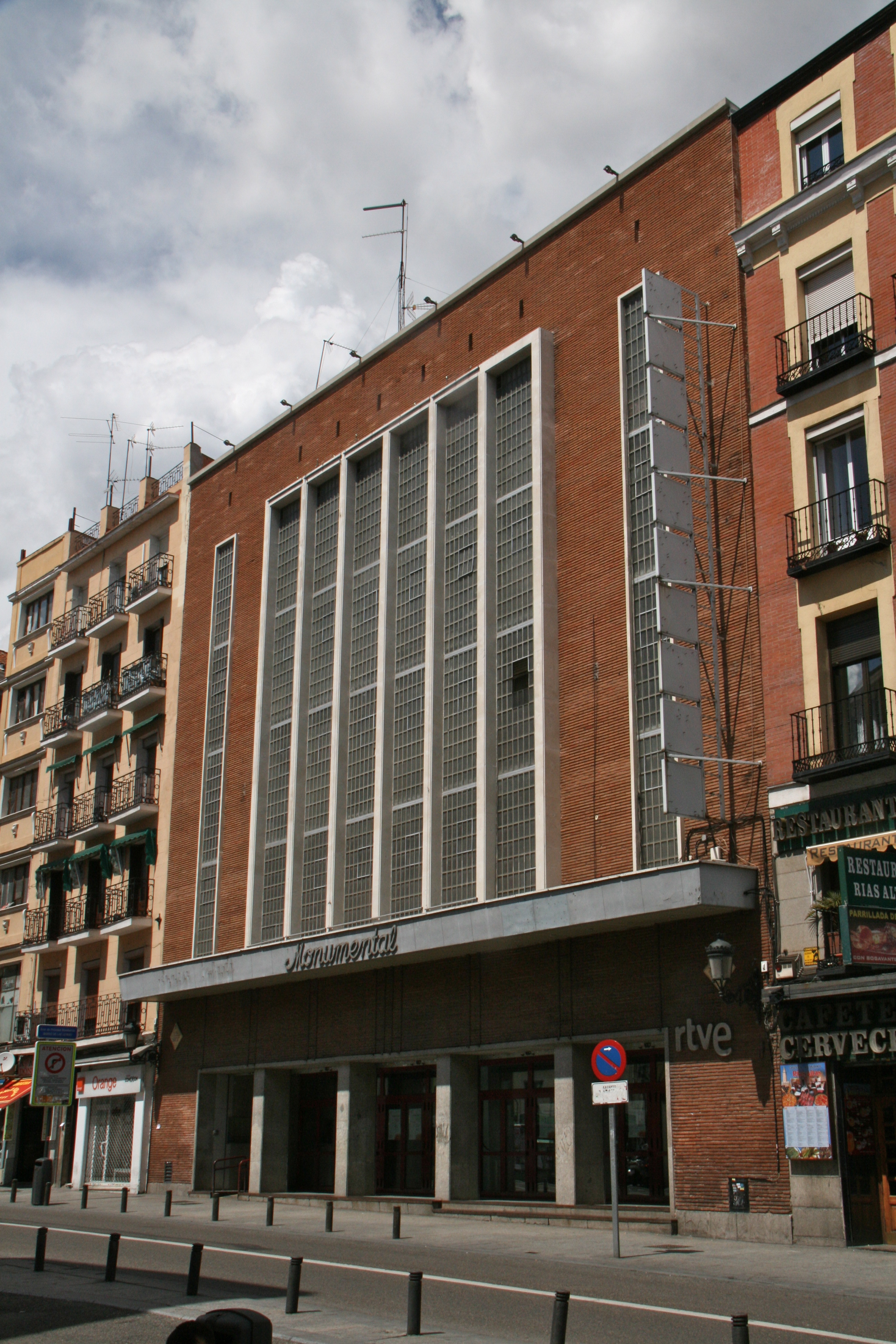
Teatro Monumental

The Teatro Monumental (Monumental Theatre) is a concert hall in Madrid. The theatre, designed by Teodoro Anasagasti Algan, was built between 1922 and 1923 as a movie theatre (Teatro Cinema Monumental) and later was transformed to house concerts of different genres, from pop to classical, and jazz to folk.

The theatre is the concert venue of the RTVE Symphony Orchestra. It has a 1,600 capacity.

== See also ==
- Madrid Symphony Orchestra
- Community of Madrid Orchestra
- National Auditorium of Music
- RTVE Symphony Orchestra
- Queen Sofía Chamber Orchestra
- Joven Orquesta Nacional de España
- Teatro Real
- Zarzuela
- Teatro Pavón
