= Enrique Fernández Arbós =

Spanish violinist, composer and conductor (1863–1939)

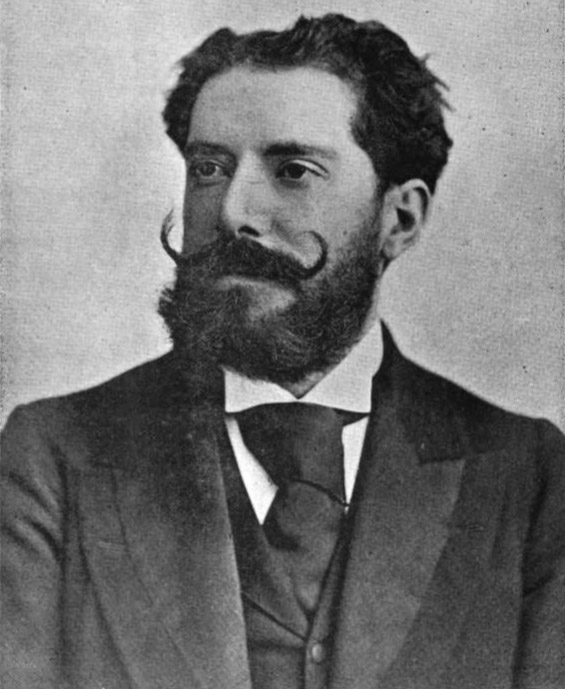
Enrique Fernández Arbós (picture from The Strad, November 1894)

Enrique Fernández Arbós (24 December 1863 – 2 June 1939) was a Spanish violinist, composer and conductor who divided much of his career between Madrid and London. He originally made his name as a virtuoso violinist and later as one of Spain's greatest conductors.

== Career ==
Fernández Arbós was born in Madrid. After studying violin at the Madrid Conservatory under Jesús Monasterio, he continued his studies in Brussels under Henri Vieuxtemps and later in Berlin under Joseph Joachim. In Brussels he studied composition with François-Auguste Gevaert and in Berlin under Heinrich von Herzogenberg. After teaching at the Madrid Conservatory and in Hamburg, with spells as leader of the Berlin Philharmonic Orchestra and Boston Symphony Orchestra, he became professor of violin at the Royal College of Music, London, in 1894, a post he occupied until 1916. In 1904, he was offered the position of principal conductor of the Madrid Symphony Orchestra, a position he held for nearly 35 years.

His many pupils included Maud MacCarthy (later Omananda Puri), the wife of the composer John Foulds.

He conducted the first Spanish performance in 1932, at the Calderón Theatre in Madrid, of Igor Stravinsky's The Rite of Spring and conducted the first performance, in Spain, of Richard Strauss's Don Quixote (1915; with Juan Ruiz Casaux, cello).

He enjoyed a successful solo career but was also engaged as concertmaster of several orchestras including those of Berlin, Boston, Glasgow and Winnipeg. He was guest conductor of the St. Louis Symphony for three seasons from 1929 to 1931.

He died in 1939 at his summer home in San Sebastián, where he had been living after the Spanish Revolution of 1936.

== Music ==
As a composer, Arbós is probably best known for his piano trio Tres Piezas Originales en Estilo Español. His violin pieces also enjoyed considerable popularity. In addition to these works, he wrote a zarzuela, El Centro de la Tierra (1895), which, for a brief period after its publication, was frequently performed in Spain. His orchestral arrangements of five pieces from Isaac Albéniz's Iberia are well known. In 1928, with the Madrid Symphony Orchestra, he recorded three of these, along with pieces by Manuel de Falla, Enrique Granados, Joaquín Turina, and himself; these recordings have been issued on compact disc by Dutton.
