= Castile and León Symphony Orchestra =

Symphony orchestra based in Valladolid, Castile and León, Spain

Castilla y León Symphony Orchestra
- Symphony orchestra
- Native name: Orquesta Sinfónica de Castilla y León
- Short name: OSCyL
- Former name: Orquesta Ciudad de Valladolid
- Founded: 1991
- Location: Valladolid
- Concert hall: Miguel Delibes Cultural Center
- Principal conductor: Thierry Fischer
- Concertmaster: Luis M. Suárez
- Website: www.oscyl.com

The Castilla y León Symphony Orchestra (Orquesta Sinfónica de Castilla y León, OSCyL for short) is a Spanish symphony orchestra based in Valladolid, the city which serves as the de facto capital of the Castile and León region.

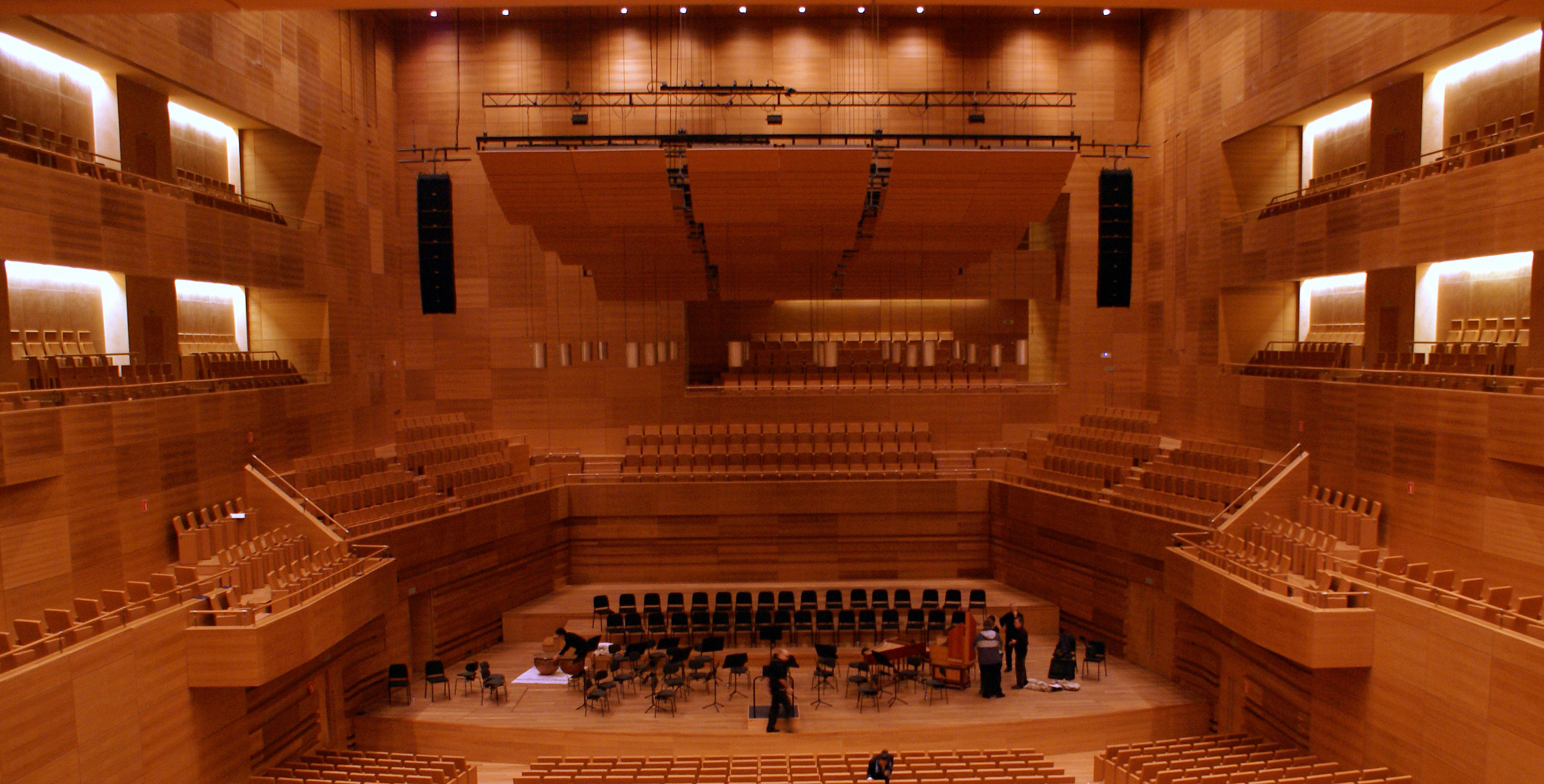
Auditorium

== History ==
It was created in 1991 following the disappearance of the Orquesta Ciudad de Valladolid. In 2007 it acquired a purpose-built hall in the Miguel Delibes Cultural Center of Valladolid.

=== Conductors ===
Starting in 2012, Jesús López Cobos (1940-2018) was the Conductor Emeritus. British conductor Andrew Gourlay held the position of Chief Conductor from 2015 to 2020. Jaime Martin served as principal guest conductor. Starting in June 2022, the present music director is Thierry Fischer. The present (season 2026-2027) associate conductors are Vasily Petrenko and Elim Chan. Artist in residence is Midori. Andrew Norman is composer in residence.

Tenance	Conductor
1991–2002	(Spain) Max Bragado
2002–2009	(Colombia) Alejandro Posada
2009–2012	(France) Lionel Bringuier
2015–2020	(United Kingdom) Andrew Gourlay
2022–present	(Switzerland) Thierry Fischer

== Collaborations ==
Over more than three decades, the orchestra have performed in over several hundreds of concerts together with a long list of artists, amongst who have been maestros Jesús López Cobos (emeritus conductor), Semyon Bychkov, Vasily Petrenko, Gianandrea Noseda, Leonard Slatkin, Pinchas Steinberg, Giovanni Antonini, Yan Pascal Tortelier, Jukka-Pekka Saraste, David Afkham and Leopold Hager; vocalists Ian Bostridge, Leo Nucci, Renée Fleming, Juan Diego Flórez, Magdalena Kožená, Rufus Wainwright and Angela Gheorghiu; and instrumentalists among whom Daniel Barenboim, Vilde Frang, Maria João Pires, Frank Peter Zimmermann, Javier Perianes, Truls Mørk, Viktoria Mullova, Ivo Pogorelich, Emmanuel Pahud, Chick Corea, Michel Camilo, Midori, Nikolai Lugansky, Pinchas Zukerman and Vadim Repin.

== 2026–27 staff ==
- Violins I: Luis M. Suárez (CM), Beatriz Jara (assistant CM), Elizabeth Moore (SA), Cristina Alecu, Irina Alecu, Malgorzata Baczewska, Irene Ferrer, Pawel Hutnik, Vladimir Ljubimov, Eduard Marashi, Renata Michalek, Daniela Moraru, Piotr Witkowski
- Violins II: Jennifer Moreau (S), Benjamin Payen (SA), Tania Armesto, Iván Artaraz, Csilla Biro, Anneleen van den Broeck, Oscár Rodríguez, Blanca Sanchis, Andrés Ibánez
- Violas: Néstor Pou (S), Marc Charpentier (SA), Michal Ferens, Virginia Domínguez, Ciprian Filimon, Harold Hill, Doru Jijian, Paula Santos, Julien Samuel, Jokin Urtasun
- Cello's: Ricardo Pietro, Marius Diaz (S), Hectór Ochoa (AS), Montserrat Aldoma, Diego Alonso, Marie Delbousquet, Pilar Cervéro, Jordi Creus, Marta Ramos
- Double basses: Tiago Rocha (S), Mar Rodríguez (SA), Nigel Benson, Juan Carlos Fernández, Emad Khan, Nebojsa Slavic

- Flutes: Ignacio de Nicolás (S), Pablo Sagredo (SA), José Lanuza (p)
- Oboes: Sebastián Gimeno (S), Clara Pérez (SA), Juan Manuel Urbán (eh)
- Clarinets: Gonzalo Esteban (S), Laura Tárrega (SA), Julio Perpiñá (bc)
- Bassoons: Salvador Alberola (S), Alejandro Climent (SA), Fernando Arminio (cb)

- Horns: José Miguel Asensi (S), Carlos Balaguer (SA), Emilio Climent, José Manuel González, Martín Naveira
- Trumpets: Roberto Bodí (S), Emilio Ramada (SA), Miguel Oller
- Trombones: Robert Blossom (S), Federico Ramos (bt)
- Tuba: José M. Redondo (S)

- Timpani: Juan A. Martín (S)
- Percussion: Ricardo López (S), Tomás Martín (SA), Cayetano Gómez
- Harp: Marianne ten Voorde (S)

== Discography ==
The OSCyL have participated in important artistic projects and have produced several records with Deutsche Grammophon, BIS, Naxos, Tritó and Verso. Both Bragado and Posada conducted the orchestra in recordings for Naxos. Gourlay oversaw the launch in 2019 of the orchestra's in-house label, releasing its first disc of music by Rachmaninoff, followed by Shostakovich's Symphony no.10.
