= Algorithm King =

2025 portrait of King Charles III

- Artist: Ai-Da
- Year: 2025
- Type: Painting
- Medium: Oil on canvas
- Subject: Charles III

Algorithm King is a 2025 painting of King Charles III by Ai-Da, a humanoid robot credited with being the world's first ultra-realistic robot artist.

== Description ==
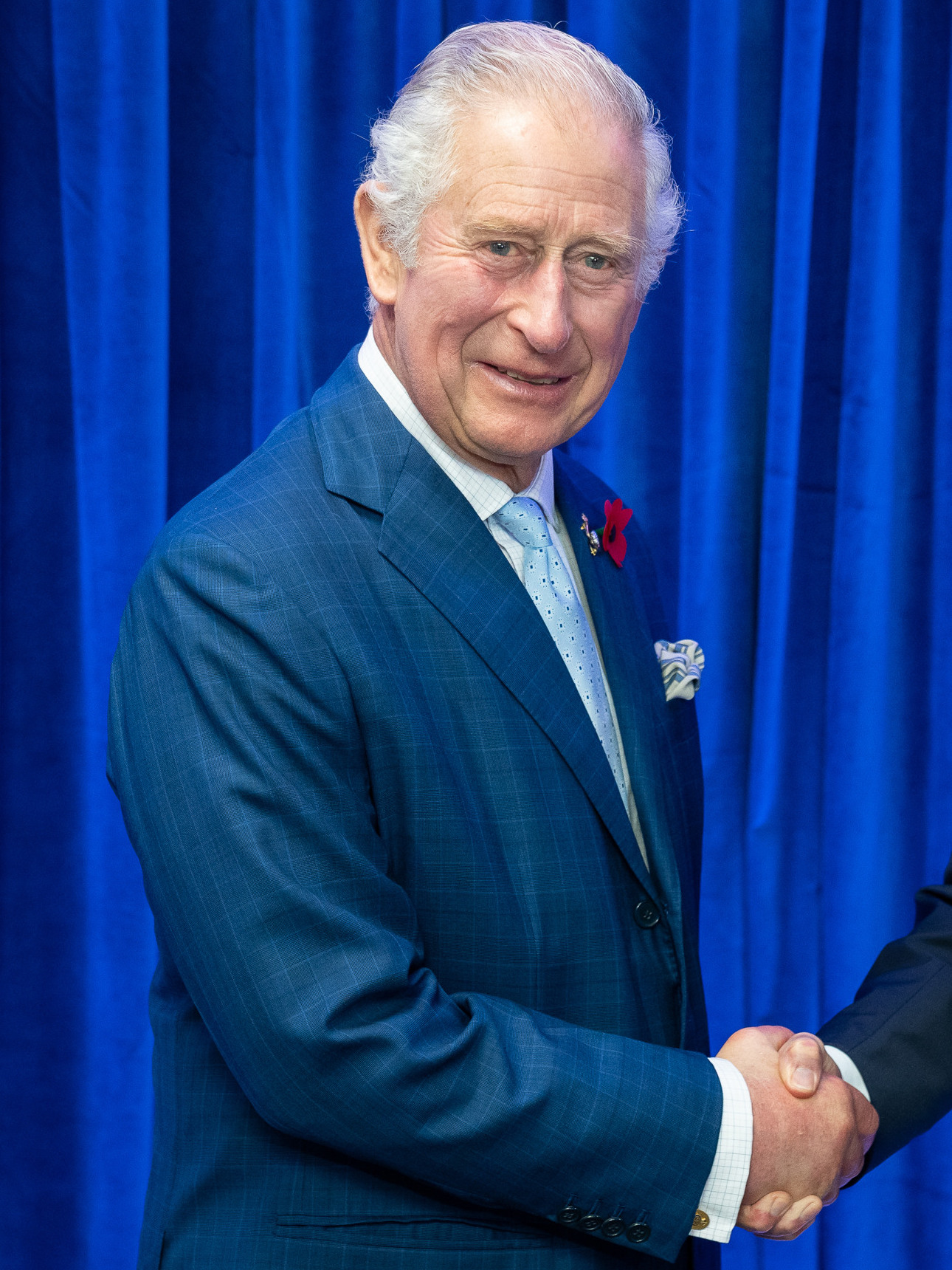
Charles during the 2021 U.N. Climate Change Conference in Glasgow

Ai-Da used artificial intelligence (AI) algorithms to create the image, which was executed as an oil on canvas painting. Ai-Da used image processing and algorithmic choice to analyze different photos of the King, who did not sit for the portrait. It was first exhibited at the UK Mission to the WTO and United Nations in Geneva as part of the 2025 AI for Good Summit along with Ai-Da's previous work Algorithm Queen, which depicts Queen Elizabeth II. Ai-Da said the portrait "is not just a creative act, it's a statement about the evolving role of AI in our society, and to reflect on how artificial intelligence is shaping the cultural landscape." Aidan Meller, the robot's creator, said "As both a monarch and a long-standing advocate for the arts and sustainability, King Charles emphasises some concerns that Ai-Da's work also seeks to explore – the tension between traditional and the contemporary, for example."

== Reception ==
The unveiling of the portrait contributed to the ongoing debate surrounding the role of AI within the art industry, with those opposing it arguing that its employment takes opportunities away from traditional artists whose livelihood depends on producing artwork. Writing for The Daily Telegraph, Chris Harvey gave the portrait 2 out of 5 stars and described it as "not awful, not ugly, certainly not shocking; just innocuous."
