= Nuno Coelho =

Nuno Coelho may refer to:

- Nuno André Coelho (born 1986), Portuguese football defender
- Nuno Miguel Prata Coelho (born 1987), Portuguese football midfielder
- Nuno Coelho, Portuguese conductor
