= Gayford =

Gayford is a surname. Notable people with the surname include:

- Christopher Gayford (born 1963), English music conductor
- Clarke Gayford (born 1977), New Zealand radio and television broadcaster
- Thomas Gayford (1928–2026), Canadian equestrian
