= Pablo González (conductor) =

Spanish conductor

Pablo González Bernardo (known as Pablo González) (born 1975), is a Spanish conductor.

== Biography ==
Pablo González was born in Oviedo, Spain, and studied at the Conservatoire in his hometown and in London at the Guildhall School of Music and Drama. In 2000, González won the first prize of the Donatella Flick Conducting Competition and in 2006 the first prize of the Cadaqués Orchestra International Conducting Competition.

Pablo González has served as assistant conductor of the London Symphony Orchestra, the Spanish National Youth Orchestra and the Bournemouth Symphony Orchestra, Bournemouth Sinfonietta and as principal guest conductor of the Cadaqués Orchestra. As a guest conductor he has also conducted the Orchestre de Chambre de Lausanne, Deutsche Radio Philharmonie, Danish National Chamber Orchestra, City of London Sinfonia, Sinfonieorchester Basel, Orchestre National de Belgique, Wiener Kammerorchester, Orchestre Philarmonique de Strasbourg, Royal Flemish Philharmonic, Hamburger Symphoniker, Orchestre Philarmonique de Liège, Winterthur Musikkolegium and most of the orchestras in Spain.

In October 2008 González was appointed principal conductor of the Barcelona Symphony and Catalonia National Orchestra.
