= Felix Mildenberger =

German conductor

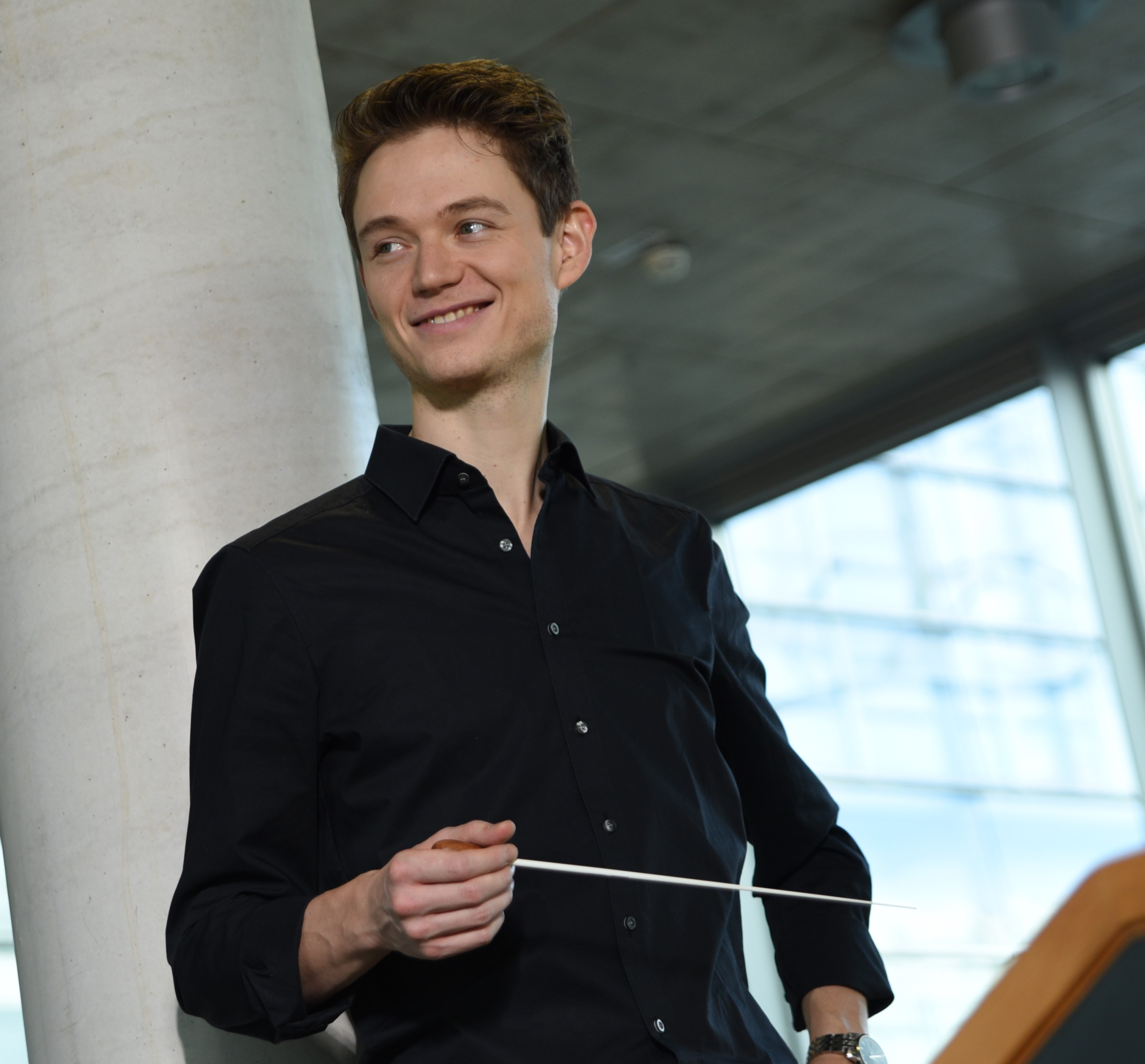
Felix Mildenberger

Felix Mildenberger (born 1990 in Wolfach) is a German conductor. He has been appointed Principal Guest Conductor of the Filarmonica Teatro Regio di Torino from 2022. Since 2014 he has been principal conductor and artistic director of the Sinfonieorchester Crescendo Freiburg, which he co-founded in 2014.

== Career ==
Mildenberger grew up in Germany as the son of a primary-school teacher and a secondary-school teacher. His interest in conducting came up when he was about 17. Although he had been playing violin and piano from the age of 7, he did not get introduced to the bigger symphonic repertoire until he got to play in a French-German youth symphony orchestra himself. At this occasion he also got the chance to conduct an orchestra for the first time.

After his Abitur and a year of Social Service in Canada, he went on to study conducting from 2011 until 2015 at the University of Music Freiburg and later at the University of Music and Performing Arts Vienna with Lutz Koehler, Mark Stringer, Gerhard Markson, Scott Sandmeier and Massimiliano Matesic. In addition, he studied with David Zinman, Paavo Järvi, Neeme Järvi, Markus Stenz in master classes as well as with Bernard Haitink, whom he has repeatedly served as assistant and cover conductor since then.

He furthermore assisted Sir Simon Rattle, François-Xavier Roth, Gianandrea Noseda, Robin Ticcitati, Fabio Luisi, and others.

In 2014 he founded together with friends the Sinfonieorchester Crescendo Freiburg and has been their principal conductor and music director ever since.

Since 2017 he has been conducting fellow with the Dirigentenforum of the German Music Council. In 2021 he was added to the artist roster “Maestros von Morgen”.

Between 2017 and 2019, Mildenberger had the position of assistant conductor to music director Emmanuel Krivine at the Orchestre National de France. Prior to his he had lectured in orchestral conducting for two years at the University of Music Freiburg.

After winning the Donatella Flick LSO Conducting Competition 2018 he has been assistant conductor of the London Symphony Orchestra for more than two years.

During the season 2019/20 he worked as Paavo Järvi's assistant conductor at the Tonhalle Orchester Zürich.

Mildenberger lives in Hamburg, Germany, and is fluent in German, English and French.

== International orchestras ==
Mildenberger has worked with the London Symphony Orchestra, Orchestre National de France, Tonhalle-Orchester Zürich, hr-Sinfonieorchester, SWR Symphonieorchester, NDR Radiophilharmonie, Konzerthausorchester Berlin, Deutsche Kammerphilharmonie Bremen, Filarmonica Teatro Regio Torino, Stuttgarter Philharmoniker, Bremer Philharmoniker, Nürnberger Philharmoniker, Folkwang Kammerorchester Essen, Ensemble Modern, Belgrade Philharmonic Orchestra, Musikkollegium Winterthur, Sinfonieorchester Basel, Nagoya Philharmonic Orchestra, Kansai Philharmonic Orchestra, St. Petersburg State Capella Symphony Orchestra, Orquestra de Cadaqués, Orquesta Sinfónica de Tenerife, Real Filharmonía de Galicia, Orchestre National des Pays de la Loire, Orchestre National de Lille, and others.

During the 2021/22 season Mildenberger will make his debuts with the Deutsches Symphonie-Orchester Berlin, Deutsche Radio Philharmonie Saarbrücken Kaiserslautern, and the Royal Concertgebouw Orchestra.

== Prizes and awards ==
- Prix Young Artist of the Year 2020 of the Festival der Nationen
- 1st prize at the Donatella Flick LSO Conducting Competition 2018
- 2nd prize at the XII. Cadaqués Orchestra International Conducting Competition 2017
- Robert Spano Conductor Prize at the Aspen Music Festival 2016
