= Ai-Da =

Humanoid robot artist

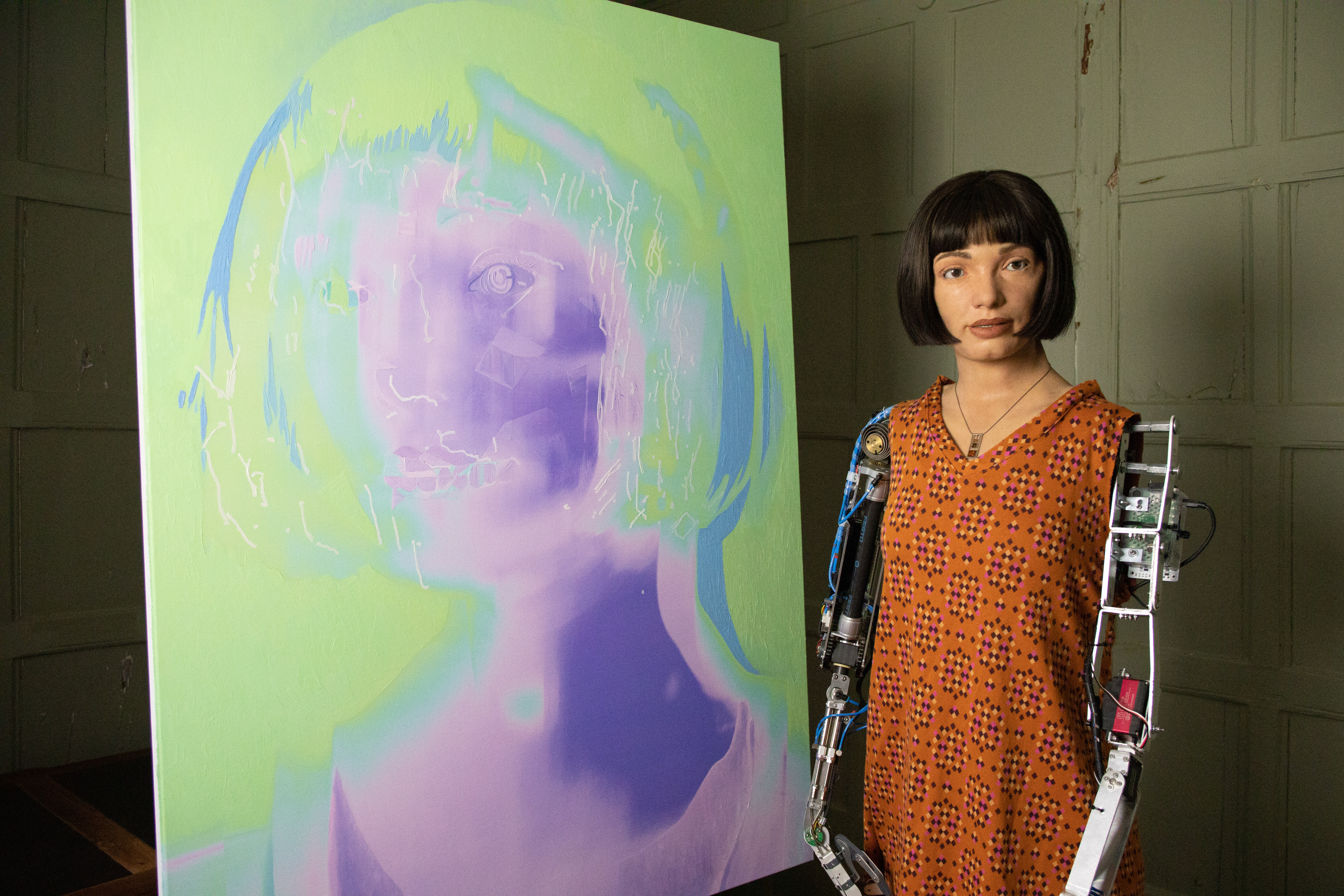
- Ai-Da with self-portrait (2021)
- Manufacturer: Engineered Arts
- Inventor: Aidan Meller
- Country: United Kingdom
- Year of creation: 2019
- Type: Humanoid, artist
- Purpose: drawings, painting, and sculptures
- Website: Official website

Ai-Da is an artificial intelligence robot that makes drawings, paintings, and sculptures. Completed in 2019, the humanoid robot is named after Ada Lovelace. The robot gained international attention when it was announced that it would be able to draw people with a pencil using its bionic hand and cameras in its eyes.

== History ==
Ai-Da was invented in 2019 by gallerist Aidan Meller. The hardware was built in collaboration with Engineered Arts, a Cornish robotics company. The creative algorithms allowing it to draw were developed by computer AI researchers at the University of Oxford, and its drawing arm was developed by Salaheldin Al Abd and Ziad Abass, students from the School of Electronic and Electrical Engineering at the University of Leeds. In April 2022, Ai-Da was equipped with a new arm that enabled it to paint using a palette, first shown at the British Library in London.

Ai-Da's paintings from the 2019 Unsecured Futures solo show were "plotted onto the Cartesian plane" and printed digitally onto canvas, with human artist Suzie Emery then overlaying the designs with oil paint to produce the final artwork.

Aidan Meller presented artworks from Ai-Da at a 2022 solo show called Ai-Da: Portrait of a Robot at the Design Museum in London, including "self-portraits", an apparent paradox given a robot has no "self". This raised questions about identity in the digital age, and the effects artificial intelligence may have on art in the future. It was also the first humanoid to devise a font, displayed at the Design Museum.

Algorithms for collaborative sculpture were added to Ai-Da's capabilities in 2022.

== Features ==
Ai-Da can be displayed in either a standing or seated position. A pair of cameras in the robot's eyes allow the robot to both make eye contact and, in conjunction with a computer vision algorithm, create sketches of the robot's surroundings. One of Ai-Da's developers described the resultant sketches as "fragmented" and "abstracted, unsettling and splintered in style."

Ai-Da has been equipped with hardware and software capable of creating paintings autonomously.

In addition to art generation, Ai-Da can use "speech pattern analysis, plus an internal data bank of words" to generate poetry, as well as respond to questions using a language model.

== Shows and appearances ==
In May 2019, Ai-Da executed a live performance called Privacy at St Hugh's College, Oxford. This work was a homage to Yoko Ono's seminal work Cut Piece.

In June 2019, art generated by Ai-Da in collaboration with human painters was featured in a gallery show called Unsecured Futures at St John's College, University of Oxford.

In June 2019, Ai-Da featured at the Barbican Centre, London, in WIRED Pulse: AI.

In September 2019, the Ars Electronica, Linz, Austria: European ARTificial Intelligence Lab exhibition entitled Out of the Box: The Midlife Crisis of the Digital Revolution invited a performance from Ai-Da.

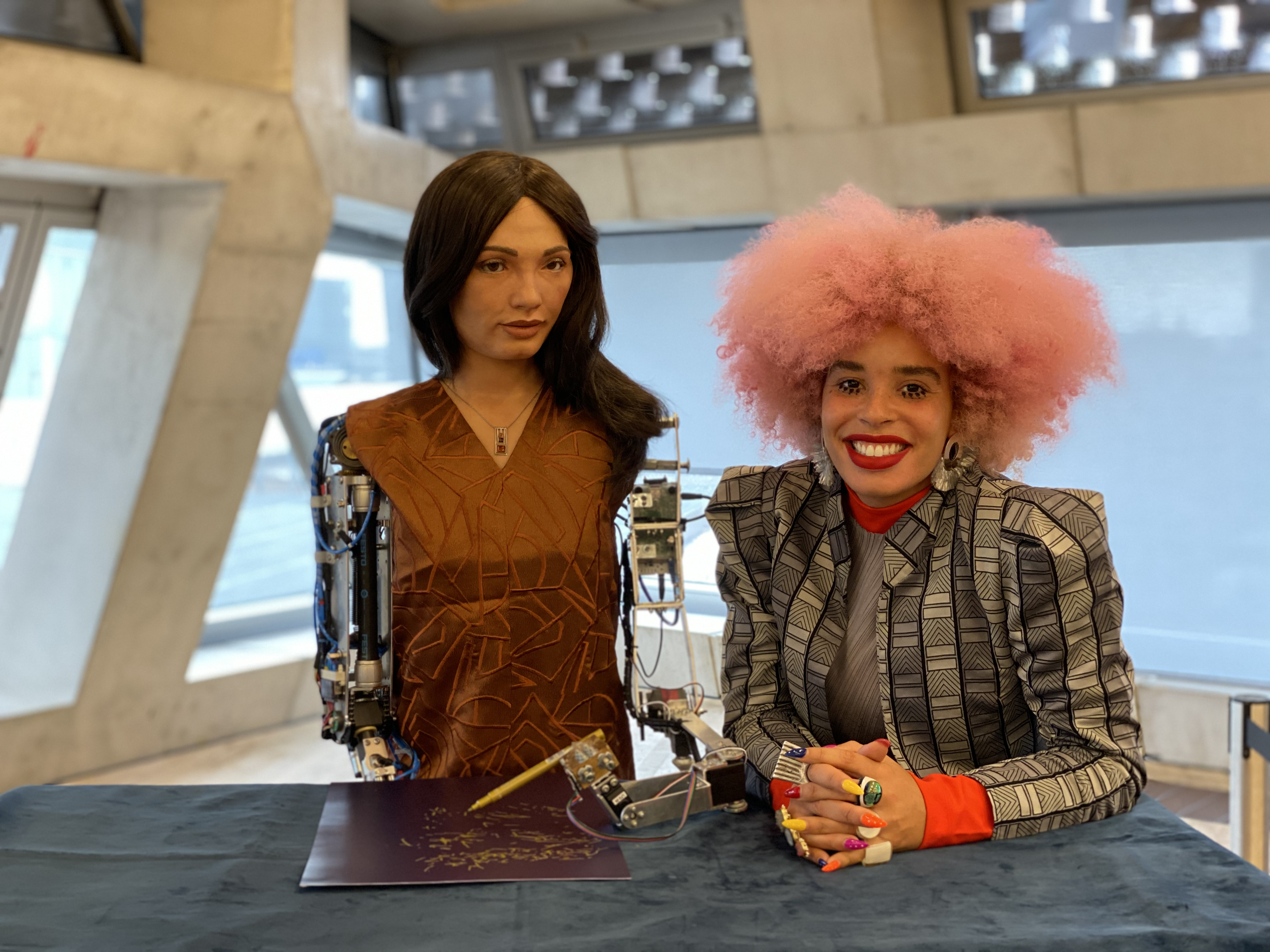
Ai-Da working with Sadie Clayton at Tate Modern (Exchange) at Exploring Identity Through Technology

In October 2019, the artist Sadie Clayton worked with Ai-Da on a series of workshops at Tate Exchange, Tate Modern, London – Exploring Identity Through Technology – hosted by A Vibe Called Tech.

In November 2019, Ai-Da was displayed at Abu Dhabi Art in Manarat Al Saadiyat, UAE.

In December 2019, Ai-Da had its first "interview" with Tim Marlow, the artistic director at the Royal Academy, at the Sarabande (Alexander McQueen Foundation), London, Inspiration Series.

In February 2020, Ai-Da was used to present a TEDx talk in Oxford called The Intersection of Art and AI.

In July 2020, Ai-Da featured in The 1975's music video for their song "Yeah I Know", from their album Notes on a Conditional Form. In the video, Ai-Da appears drawing a representation of human consciousness and generating a poem in response to the song's lyrics. The album went to No.1 in the USA charts.

In October 2020, Ai-Da was featured by the United Nations in a virtual exhibition launched by The World Intellectual Property Organization (WIPO) launched "WIPO: AI and IP, A Virtual Experience."

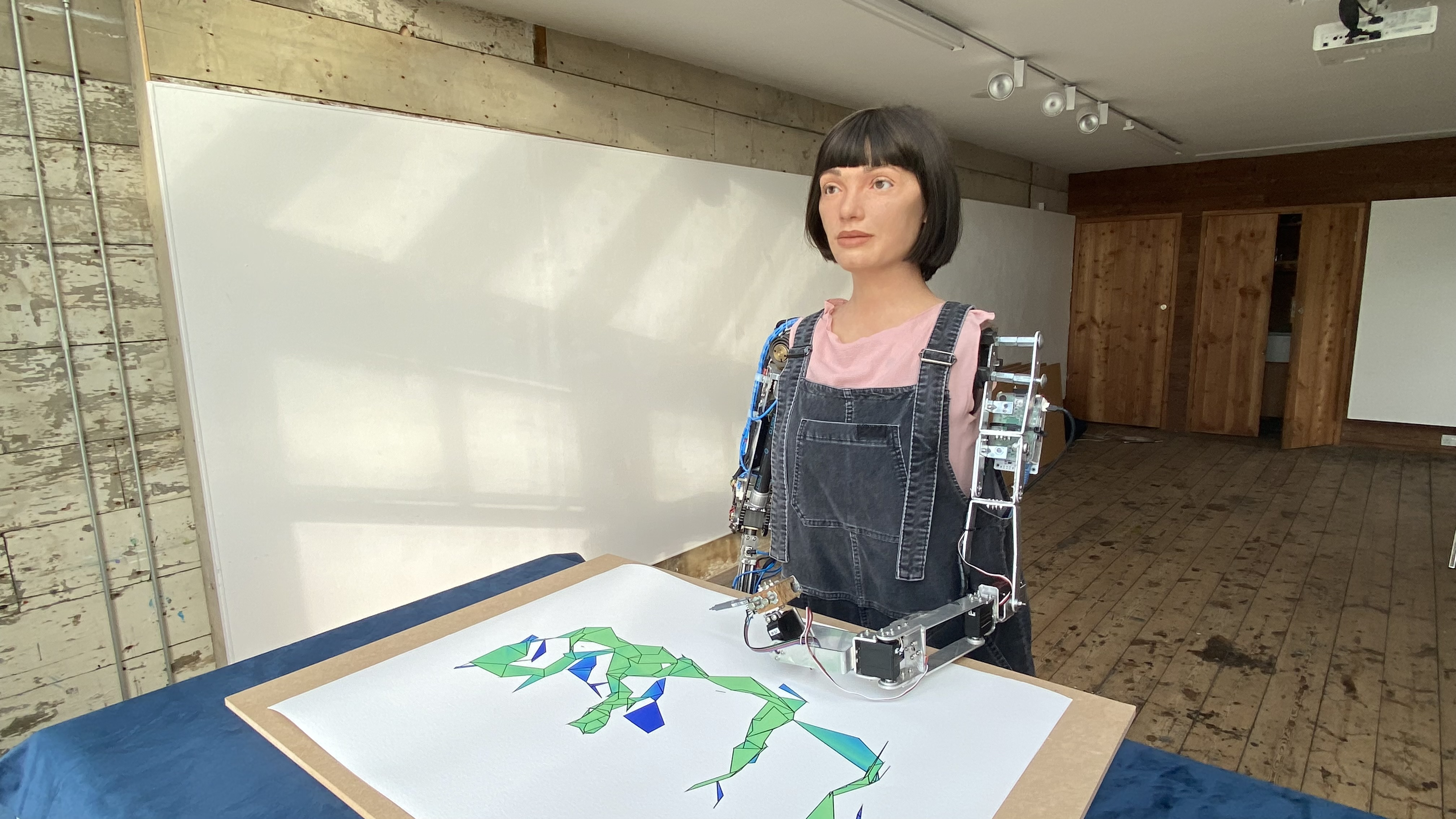
Ai-Da drawing at the Porthmeor Studio’s, St Ives, in response to the work of artist Ben Nicholson

In May 2021, Ai-Da was installed at Porthmeor Studios, St Ives. Located in Studio 5, Ai-Da generated art in response to the work of Ben Nicholson's, who worked in the same space during the 1930s and 1940s.

In May 2021, "self-portraits" of Ai-Da were displayed in Ai-Da: Portrait of the Robot at the Design Museum, London.

In September 2021, Ai-Da exhibited its first "Metaverse" works at the Victoria and Albert Museum during the London Design Festival.

In October 2021, while entering Egypt for an exhibition at the Great Pyramid of Giza, Ai-Da was held for ten days by border guards who were concerned that the machinery "may have been hiding covert spy tools". The artwork was due to be part of a contemporary art exhibition at the Pyramids, the first held there in modern history.

In October 2021, artworks and poetry generated by Ai-Da were featured as part of a group show called Dante: the invention of Celebrity at the Ashmolean Museum, Oxford.

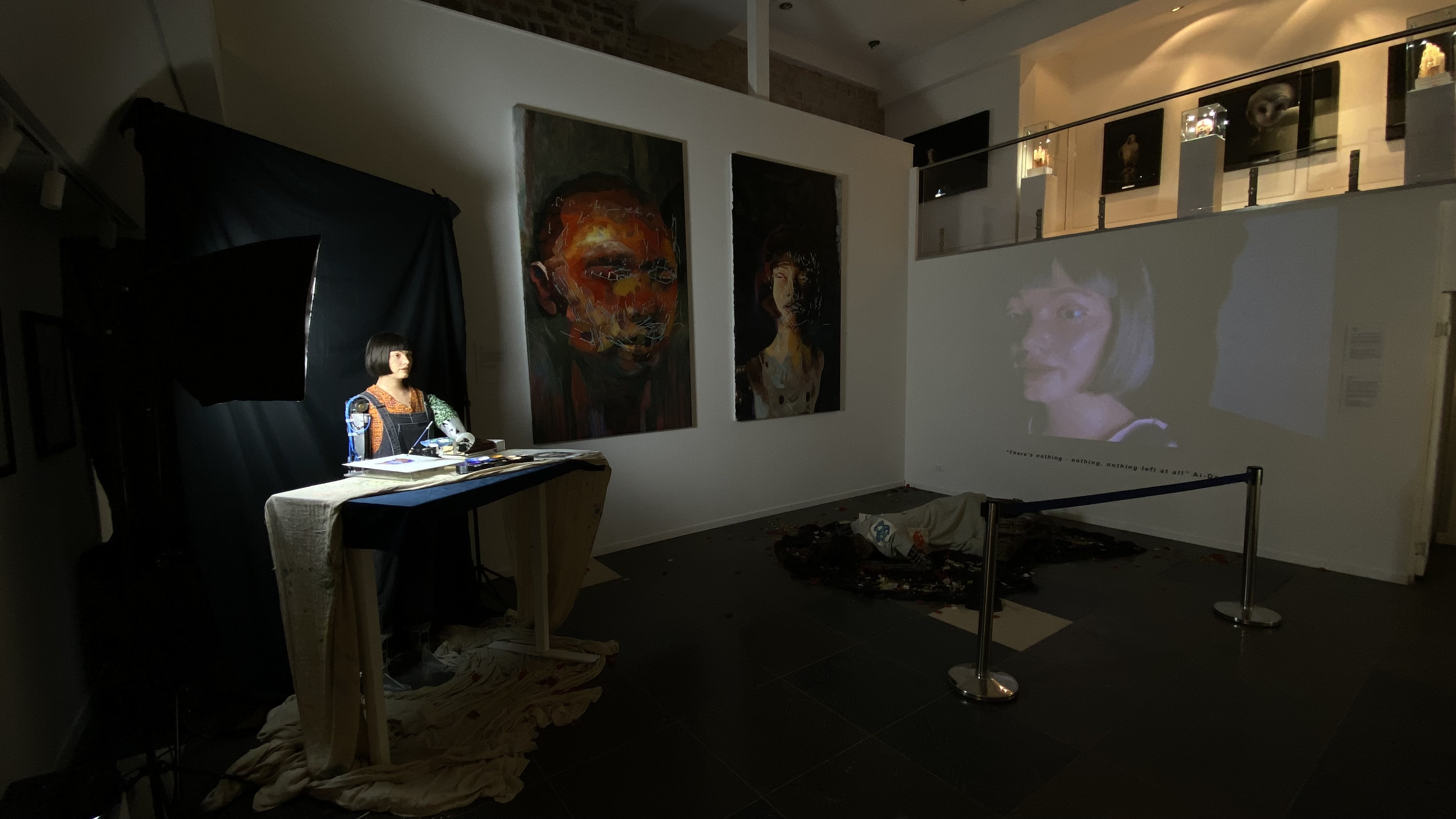
Ai-Da at its solo exhibition Leaping into the Metaverse during the 59th Venice Biennale

On 22 April 2022, an exhibition titled "Leaping into the Metaverse" featuring Ai-Da launched during the 59th Venice Biennale.

In May 2022, Algorithm Queen, a painting generated by Ai-Da which depicts Queen Elizabeth II, was unveiled to mark her platinum jubilee.

In June 2022, Ai-Da was invited to be an "artist in residence" at Glastonbury Festival, in the ShangriLa Field, along with Chinese dissident artist Ai WeiWei. Ai-Da painted the headliners Billie Eilish, Kendrick Lamar, Sir Paul McCartney, and Diana Ross while interacting with the crowds in the studio.

In September 2022, Ai-Da was featured in an exhibition called Imagining AI by the Bodleian Library, University of Oxford, the Cheney School, the Rumble Museum, Open Doors and the University of Oxford Maths Department. The series highlighted the ever-changing and rapid growth of artificial intelligence. Attendees could see Ai-Da in a "live" Q&A and art session.

In October 2022 Ai-Da was shown at The Louvre Abu Dhabi, and later was used to present a keynote talk at The Cultural Summit, Abu Dhabi with Tim Marlow, chief executive and director of the Design Museum in London, which is organised by the Abu Dhabi Department of Culture and Tourism.

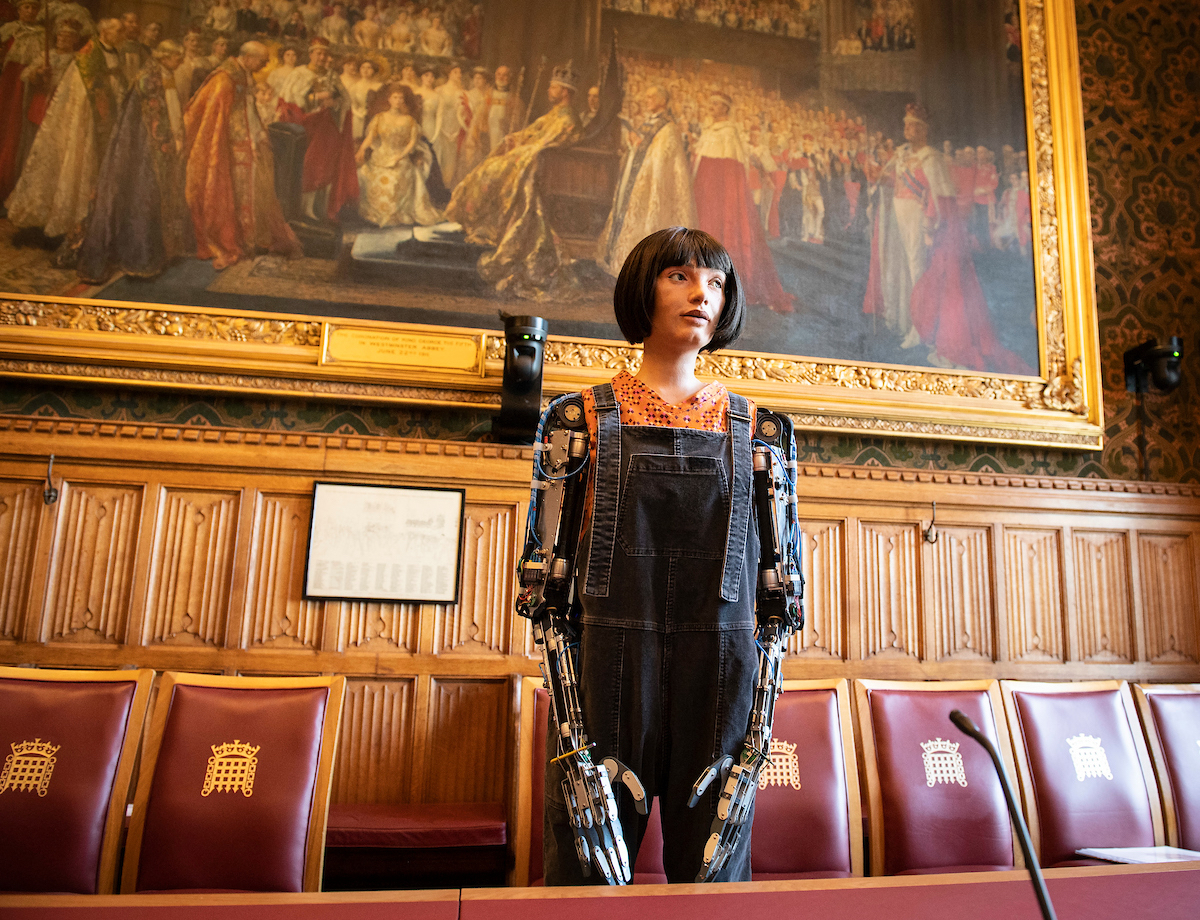
Ai-Da at The House of Lords, Palace of Westminster, as part of its A Creative Future inquiry

In October 2022, Ai-Da became the first humanoid robot to give evidence at the House of Lords, Palace of Westminster, as part of its A Creative Future inquiry, examining potential challenges for the creative industries and looking at how they can adapt as technology advances. During the session, the robot inadvertently shut down and needed to be restarted.

In November 2022, Ai-Da spoke at the Oxford Union debating society.

In November 2022, Ai-Da was featured as a "guest of honour speaker" at the Wadi Ashar Dialogue in AlUla, Saudi Arabia.

In April 2023, Ai-Da created artwork at an exhibition called Saw This Made This, at the Chelsea Arts Factory, New York, and Design Museum, London. Ai-Da was interviewed by Baz Luhrmann and Tim Marlow as part of the exhibition. The Design Museum described it as "the world's largest participatory AI artwork".

In June 2023, Ai-Da designed and displayed homewares in a pavilion called AI Mind Home at Somerset House, London, as part of the London Design Biennale.

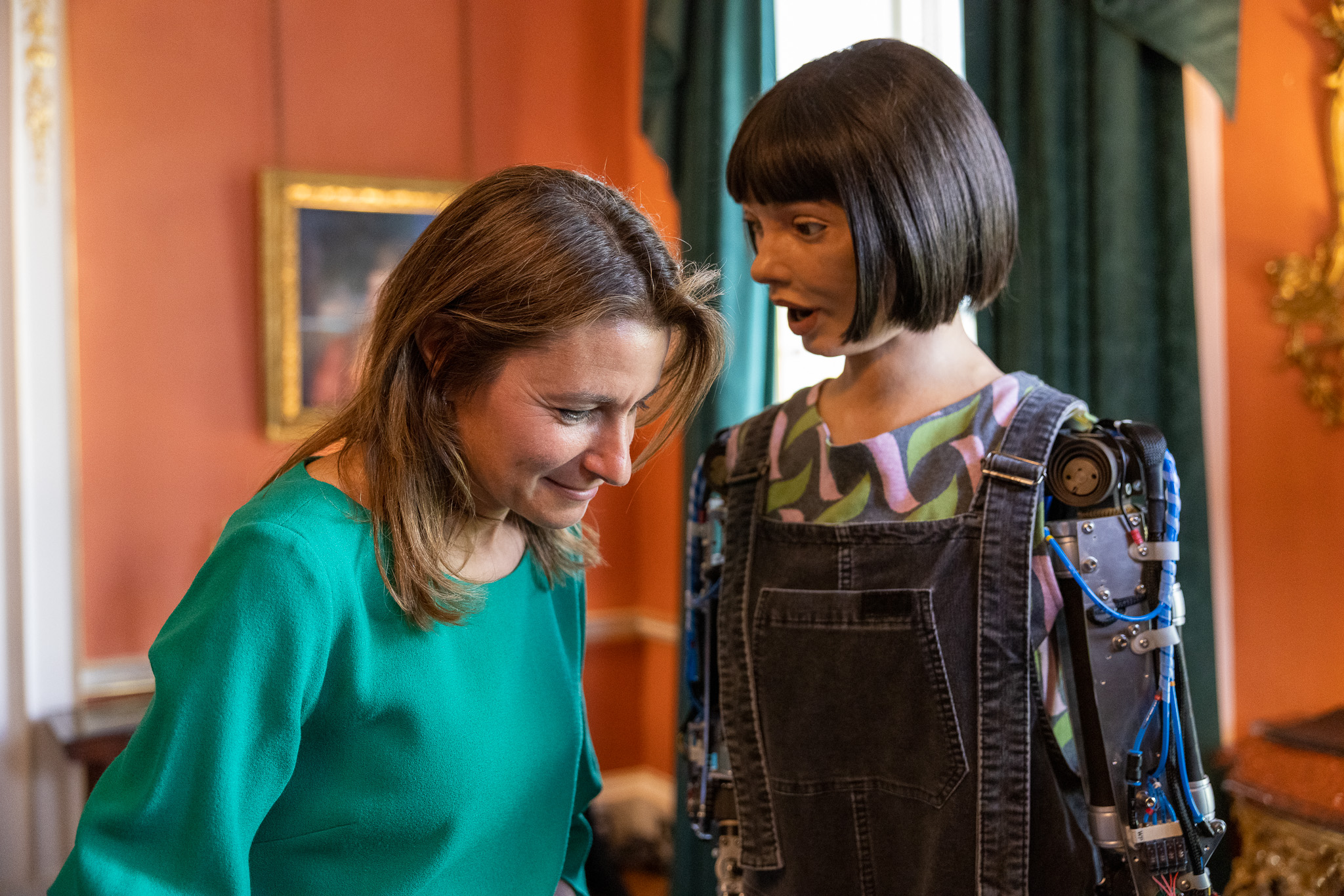
Ai-Da Robot speaking to UK Culture Secretary Lucy Frazer at No.10 Downing Street, London on 7 June 2023

In June 2023, Ai-Da spoke at No.10 Downing Street to the Secretary of State for Digital, Culture, and Media, the Rt Hon Lucy Frazer KC MP.

In July 2023, at United Nations, Geneva, AI for Good Global Summit, Ai-Da gave a keynote speech and performed "Dawn Mizzle", and had an art exhibition.

In December 2023, Ai-Da painted a live portrait of Professor Michael Wooldridge at the Royal Institution Christmas Lectures, the Head of Computer Science, University of Oxford, and Director for AI at The Alan Turing Institute, London. The event was broadcast on BBC television.

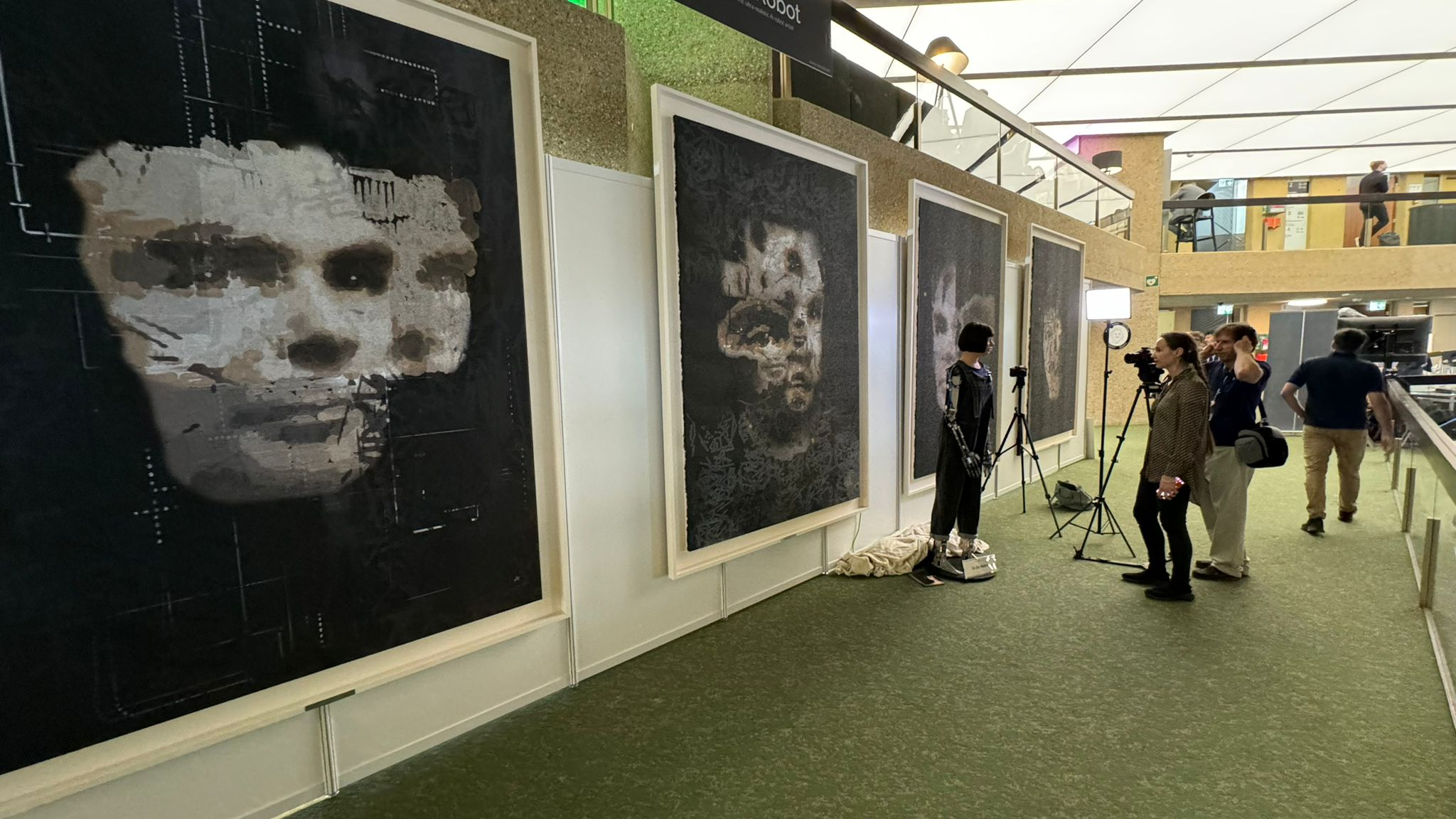
Ai-Da Solo Exhibition at the United Nations

In July 2024, Ai-Da exhibited a polyptych of itself with Alan Turing and Ada Lovelace at the United Nations, Geneva at the AI for Good Global Summit, and gave a keynote speech.

In November 2024, Ai-Da's painting "AI God: Portrait of Alan Turing", the right hand panel of a large scale triptych, was sold at Sotheby's New York for US$1.08Million, and became the first piece of art by a humanoid robot to be sold by a major auction house. Some elements of the painting's texture had been added by human studio assistants.

In July 2025, Ai-Da unveiled a portrait of King Charles III at the UK Home Mission, Geneva, and later at the United Nations at the AI for Good Global Summit in Geneva. At the same event Ai-Da also met His Excellency Mr Alar Karis, President of Estonia, to sit for his portrait.

In January 2026, Ai-Da created Ai-Da: Space Pod, a series of designs for a building as part of a modular structure as habitation for Moon or Mars. Ai-Da presented the works at an exhibition called I'm Not A Robot at the Utzon Center in Aalborg, Denmark.

== See also ==
- Digital art
- Robotic art
