= Donatella Flick Conducting Competition =

Music competition

The Donatella Flick Conducting Competition is an international music competition for young conductors, held biennially in London.

== History ==
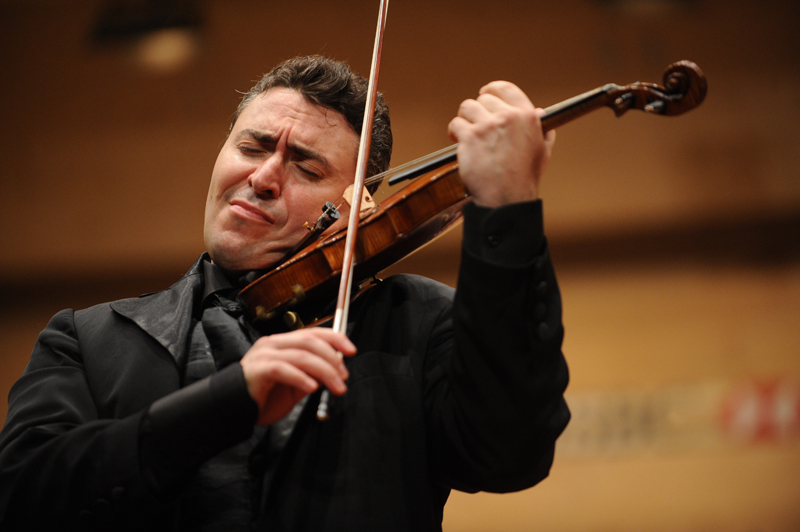
Maxim Vengerov, jury member

The Donatella Flick Conducting Competition is named after the philanthropist Donatella Flick, who founded the competition in 1990 to help young conductors to establish an international career. In 1996 the competition established a collaboration with the London Symphony Orchestra. The winner of the competition, in addition to the cash prize and the concert engagements, becomes an assistant conductor of the London Symphony Orchestra for one year after the competition.

The competition jury comprises professional conductors and musicians from the London Symphony Orchestra, and has included names such as Maxim Vengerov, Tamás Vásáry, Andrew Marriner, Leif Segerstam, Yuri Temirkanov, Yan Pascal Tortelier, Pinchas Steinberg, Daniele Gatti, Sir Neville Marriner and Carlo Rizzi.

The first round of the competition takes place at the Royal Academy of Music with ensembles of the college, and the final is at the Barbican Hall, where the three finalists conduct the London Symphony Orchestra.

The competition has received several awards and prizes, including the Pro-European Foundation for Culture, the Music Moves Europe Awards, and the Wilhelm Furtwängler Prize for its continuing encouragement of young conductors.

== Winners ==
Winners of the competition are:

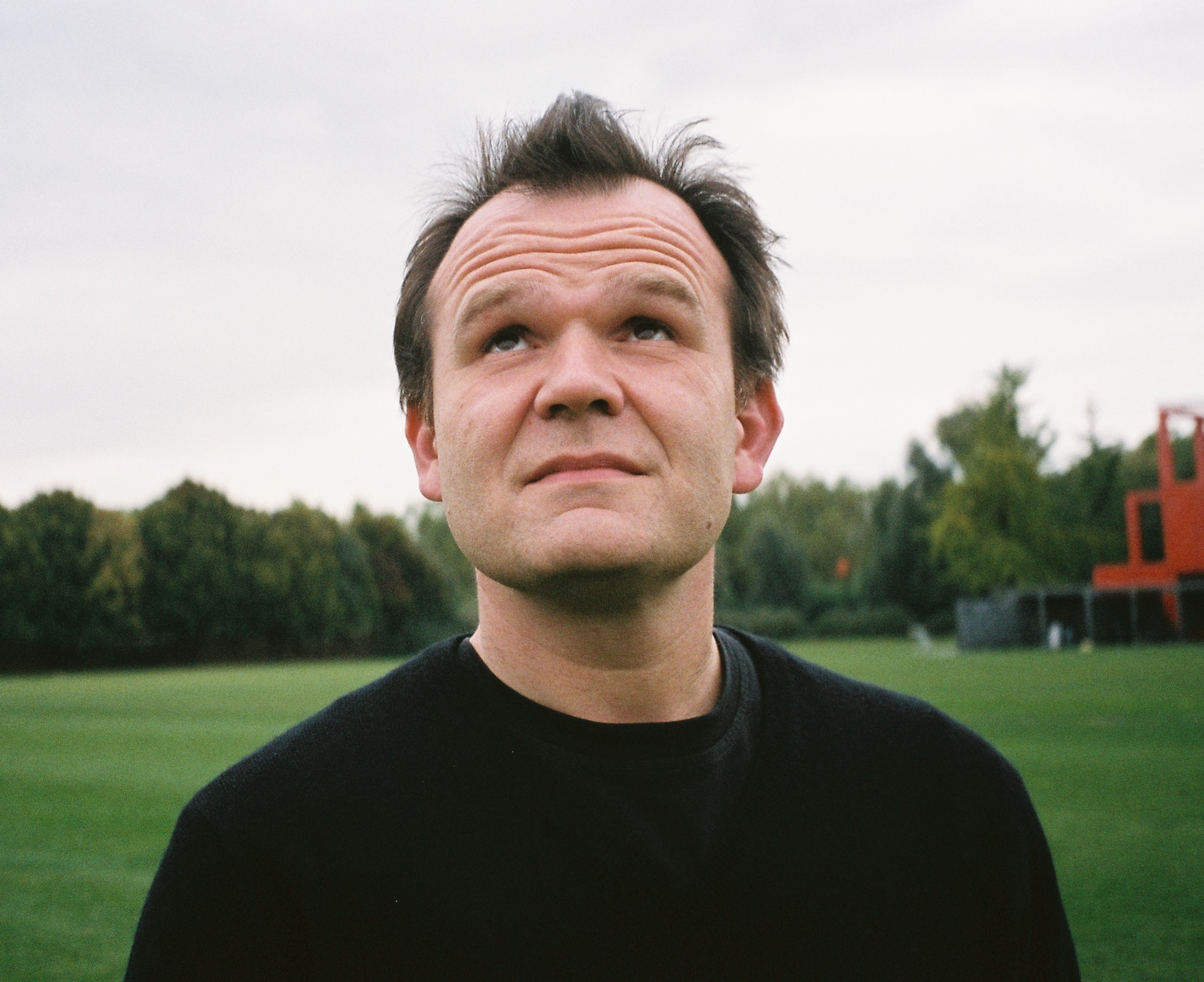
François-Xavier Roth

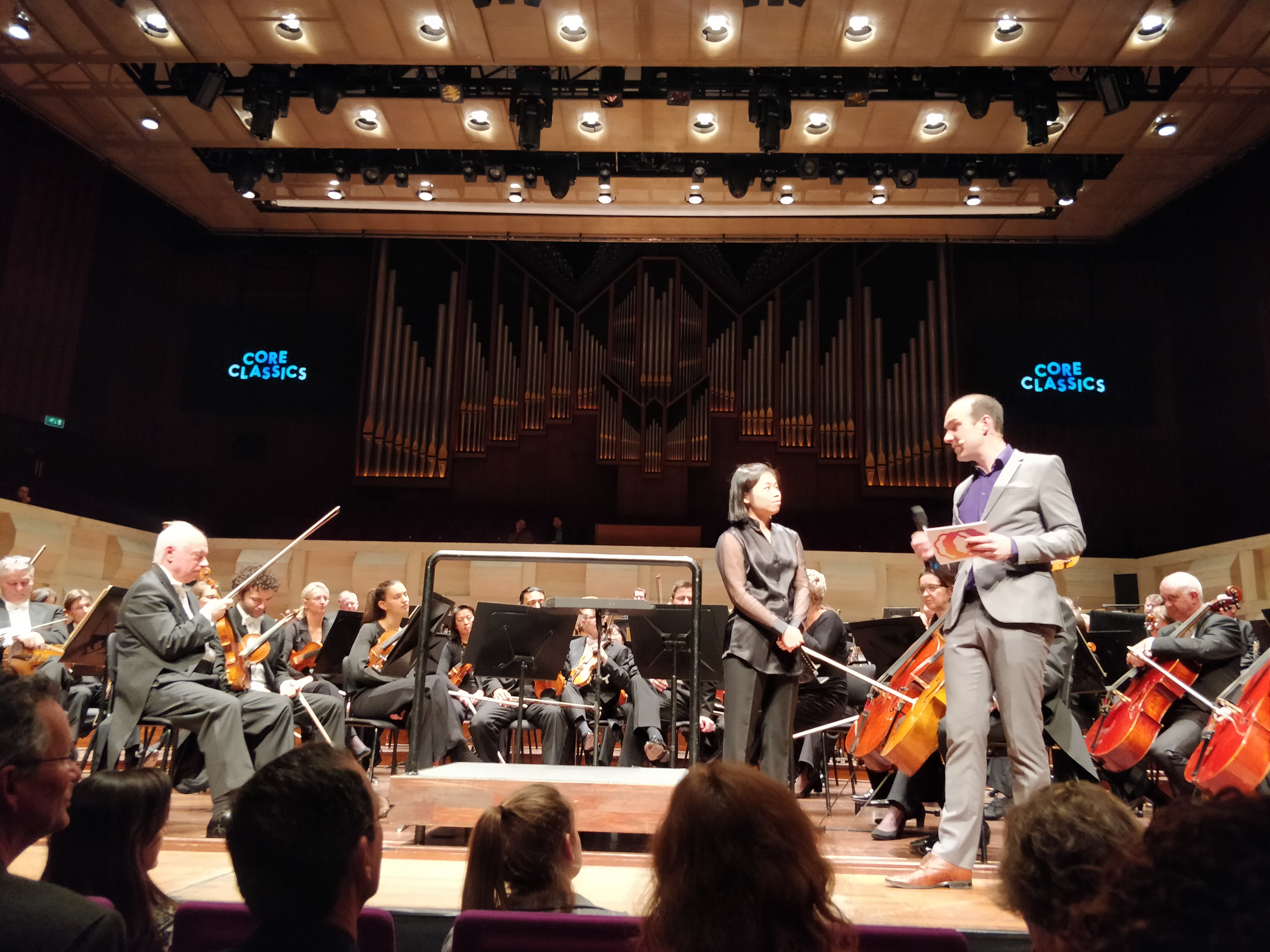
Elim Chan

- Andrew Constantine (1991)
- Timothy Lole (1992)
- Emmanuel Plasson (1994)
- Tommaso Placidi (1996)
- Paul Mann (1998)
- Pablo González Bernardo and François-Xavier Roth (2000)
- Christophe Mangou (2002)
- Fabien Gabel (2004)
- Michal Dworzynski (2006)
- David Afkham (2008)
- Clemens Schuldt (2010)
- Alexandre Bloch (2012)
- Elim Chan (2014)
- Niklas Benjamin Hoffmann (2016)
- Felix Mildenberger (2018)
- Julio García Vico (2021)
- Nicolò Umberto Foron (2023)
- Matteo Dal Maso (2025)
