= Algorithm Queen =

2022 portrait of Queen Elizabeth II

- Artist: Ai-Da
- Year: 2022
- Type: Painting
- Medium: Oil on canvas
- Subject: Elizabeth II

Algorithm Queen is a 2022 painting of Queen Elizabeth II by Ai-Da, a humanoid robot artist. Ai-Da painted the Queen in celebration of her Platinum Jubilee.

== Description ==
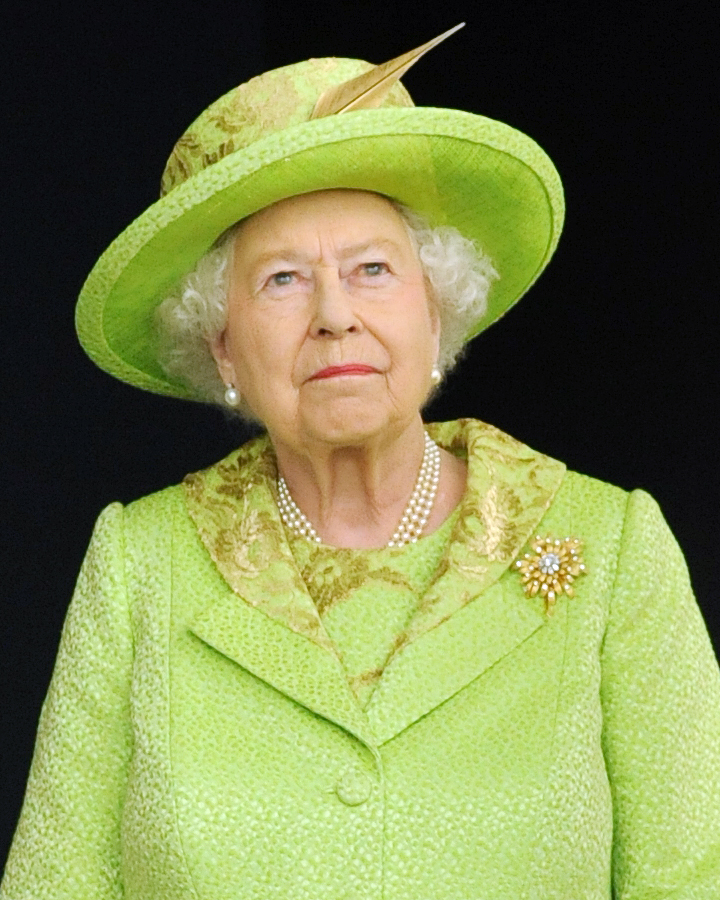
A similar photo of Elizabeth visiting Titanic Belfast in 2012

Ai-Da's developer described the robot as using "cameras in her eyes" and a "painting arm" to create the portrait.

Algorithm Queen was layered and scaled to produce the final multi-dimensional portrait of the monarch. The portrait was exhibited publicly in London later in 2022.

Ai-Da said, "I'd like to thank Her Majesty the Queen for her dedication, and for the service she gives to so many people. She is an outstanding, courageous woman who is utterly committed to public service. I think she's an amazing human being, and I wish The Queen a very happy Platinum Jubilee".

Aidan Meller, the robot's creator, said the first portrait of the Queen by a robot provided an opportunity to think about "all that has changed during the Queen's life". He said, "We are excited Ai-Da Robot has made history just in time for the Queen's Jubilee".

Jonathan Jones, The Guardian's art critic, said the painting showed the Queen's eyes with "a vacant, not quite human look. The mixture of leaden accuracy and, at the same time, complete lack of emphasis, feeling or conviction in Ai-Da's depiction of Her Maj is a telling glimpse of the limits of the AI 'art' genre. The machine records, but does not see. Because it has no conscious mind, let alone emotions".

== See also ==
- Algorithm King, 2025 painting of Elizabeth's successor Charles by Ai-Da
