= Lionel Bringuier =

French conductor, cellist and pianist

Lionel Bringuier (born 24 September 1986, Nice) is a French conductor, cellist and pianist.

== Biography ==
Bringuier is the fourth child in a family of musicians, including his brother Nicolas Bringuier, a pianist. At age 5, Bringuier began musical studies at the Nice conservatory, where he won several first prizes. At age 13, in February 2000, he was admitted to the Conservatoire national supérieur de musique et de danse de Paris, where he continued his studies in cello and in conducting. His teachers there included Philippe Muller. At the Conservatoire de Paris, he then began conducting studies, where his teachers included Zsolt Nagy. Bringuier graduated cum laude from the Conservatoire de Paris with diplomas in cello studies and conducting in June 2004. Bringuier has performed in a cello-piano duo with his brother Nicolas.

In 2005, Bringuier became assistant conductor with the Ensemble orchestral de Paris. That same year, he won the 49th International Besançon Competition for Young Conductors. In 2007, Bringuier became associate conductor of the Orchestre National de Bretagne. In the US, Bringuier took up the post of assistant conductor of the Los Angeles Philharmonic in 2007, appointed by Esa-Pekka Salonen. During the subsequent music directorship of Gustavo Dudamel, Bringuier was promoted to associate conductor, and later, to resident conductor (the first person to hold this title in the orchestra's history). He stood down from this post after the 2012–2013 season.

From 2009 to 2012, Bringuier was Music Director of the Orquesta Sinfónica de Castilla y León (Valladolid, Spain). Bringuier first guest-conducted the Tonhalle-Orchester Zürich in November 2011, and returned in June 2012. In October 2012, the Tonhalle-Orchester Zürich named Bringuier as its next chief conductor and music director, as of the 2014–2015 season, with an initial contract of 4 years. Bringuier concluded his tenure with the Tonhalle Orchestra at the end of the 2017–2018 season.

In 2019, Bringuier became an associated artist (Artiste associé) with the Orchestre philharmonique de Nice. In December 2023, the orchestra and the mayor of Nice announced the appointment of Bringuier as the orchestra's next principal conductor, effective with the 2023–2024 season, with immediate effect, with an initial contract for the 2023–2024 and 2024–2025 seasons.

In 2021, Bringuier first guest-conducted the Orchestre Philharmonique Royal de Liège (OPRL). He returned to the OPRL for two subsequent guest-conducting engagements. In January 2024, the OPRL announced the appointment of Bringuier as its next music director, effective with the 2025–2026 season, with an initial contract of 4 years.

Bringuier has made commercial recordings of the music of Vincent D'Indy with the Orchestre de Bretagne for the Timpani Records label, and of Camille Saint-Saëns with the Orchestre Philharmonique de Radio France for the Erato label.

Cultural offices
Preceded by Alejandro Posada	Principal Conductor, Orquesta Sinfónica de Castilla y León; 2009–2012	Succeeded by Andrew Gourlay
Preceded by Daniele Callegari	Principal Conductor, Orchestre philharmonique de Nice; 2023–present	Succeeded by incumbent
Preceded by Gergely Madaras	Principal Conductor, Orchestre Philharmonique Royal de Liège; 2025–present	Succeeded by incumbent
