= Emmanuel Plasson =

French conductor (born 1965)

Emmanuel Plasson (born 1965) is a French conductor.

== Life ==
Son of the conductor Michel Plasson, Emmanuel Plasson began piano music studies at the Conservatoire de Toulouse, before studying violin with his mother, Mercedes Plasson. He was awarded a gold medal in 1981. In 1984, he studied violin in David Takeno's class at the Guildhall School of Music and Drama of London, from which he graduated in 1986. In 1988, he premiered the concerto n°2 for violin and string orchestra by Aubert Lemeland on Radio France, a concerto which he recorded with the Ensemble instrumental de Grenoble. Then, from the 1990s, Plasson continued his musical studies in the United States, notably at the Pierre Monteux School in Maine, then at the Yale School of Music. He then turned to the study of conducting. He won the Donatella Flick Conducting Competition in 1994, conducting the Philharmonia Orchestra of London.

His career as a conductor began in 1997, when he led the Royal Ballet of Covent Garden. In the late 1990s, he was Assistant Chief of the Metropolitan Opera of New York. Among the orchestras he has conducted are the BBC Philharmonic Orchestra, the BBC National Orchestra of Wales, the Royal Scottish National Orchestra, the Ulster Orchestra, and the Royal Northern Sinfonia. In 2002, he made his debut with the Opera North in Ravel's L'Enfant et les Sortilèges and Stravinsky's Petrushka, and conducted Massenet's Werther at the Royal Danish Theatre in Copenhagen. In Australia, he conducted Gounod's Faust, Orphée aux Enfers and La Traviata in Sydney, Manon at the Melbourne Opera, and Carmen with the New Zealand Opera in Wellington and Auckland. He has conducted the symphony orchestras of Adelaide, Melbourne and the Western Australian.

In France, he notably worked with the Orchestre de chambre de Paris, the Orchestre national du Capitole de Toulouse, the Orchestre Régional de Cannes, and the Orchestre National de Bordeaux. In 2005, he conducted a production of Bizet's Les Pêcheurs de perles in New York, and in 2007, Sergei Prokofiev's Cinderella in Tokyo.
