= Cadaqués Orchestra International Conducting Competition =

Conducting competition in Spain

The Cadaqués Orchestra International Conducting Competition, was a music competition for young conductors organized by the Cadaqués Orchestra in Catalonia, Spain.

== History ==
In 1992, the first competition was held with the intention of serving as a launchpad for young conductors beginning their professional careers. The Cadaqués Orchestra oversees the competition, which was held every two years until 2010. The last competition took place in 2017. On 30 November 2019, the Orquestra de Cadaqués announced that it would adopt a period of calm and reflection. No further music competition has been held since.

The first prizes consists of a cash award and engagements to conduct orchestras such as the BBC Philharmonic, Vienna Chamber Orchestra, Royal Flemish Philharmonic, Bilbao Symphony Orchestra, RTVE Symphony Orchestra, Spanish National Orchestra and the Barcelona Symphony and Catalonia National Orchestra.

The presidents of the jury have been the conductors Gennady Rozhdestvensky and Sir Neville Marriner. Lutz Köhler, Philippe Entremont, Jorma Panula, Alexander Rahbari, Adrian Leaper and Gianandrea Noseda have been members of the jury.

In each competition one of the compulsory pieces is a new commission. Xavier Montsalvatge, Cristóbal Halffter, Luis de Pablo, Joan Guinjoan and Leonardo Balada have written pieces for the competition.

== Winners ==
- 2017 First Prize: Nuno Coelho. Second Prize: Felix Mildenberger.
- 2013 First Prize: Lorenzo Viotti. Second Prize: Vlad Vizireanu.
- 2010 First Prize: Andrew Gourlay. Second Prize: Domingo Garcia Hindoyan.
- 2008 First Prize: Michal Nestorowicz. Second Prize: Daniele Rustioni.
- 2006 First Prize: Pablo González. Second Prize: Justin Doyle.
- 2004 First Prize: not awarded. Second Prize: Hans Leenders.
- 2002 First Prize: Vasily Petrenko. Second Prize: Jonathan Pasternack.
- 2000 First Prize: not awarded. Second Prize: Christoph Müller.
- 1998 First Prize: Gloria Isabel Ramos. Second Prize: not awarded.
- 1996 First Prize: Achim Fiedler. Second Prize: Zsolt Hamar.
- 1994 First Prize: Gianandrea Noseda. Second Prize: Christopher Gayford.
- 1992 First Prize: Charles Peebles. Second Prize: Alejandro Posada.
