= Alejandro Posada =

Alejandro Posada Gómez (born in Bogotá 1960) is a Colombian conductor.

== Education ==
Posada studied in Colombia and Austria.

He studied conducting with Karl Österreicher at the Hochschule für Musik und Darstellende Kunst (Vienna), graduating with unanimous honours and receiving the Wuerdigungspreis (academic award for excellence awarded by the Austrian Ministry of Science and Research). He won First Prize at the Competition for Young Conductors, organised by the Vienna Chamber Orchestra; Second Prize at the 1st International Competition for Conductors of Cadaqués (1992) and Special Prize at the 11th Nicolai Malko International Competition for Conductors (Copenhagen).

== Career ==
In 1992 Posada won second prize at the Cadaqués Orchestra International Conducting Competition.

In 2002 he was appointed chief conductor of the Castile and León Symphony Orchestra and the following year he combined this role with a shared directorship at the National Symphony Orchestra of Colombia. In 2009, Posada left his post at the Castile and León Symphony Orchestra and was replaced by Lionel Bringuier.

In recent years he has become a frequent guest on the jury of various international composition and conducting competitions, such as the prestigious Cadaqués (Spain) competition for orchestra conductors.

== Discography ==
His recordings include a disc devoted to music by Antonio José Martínez Palacios (Sinfonía castellana, Evocaciones, El mozo de mulas) in Naxos' Spanish Classics series.
