= Nicolò Umberto Foron =

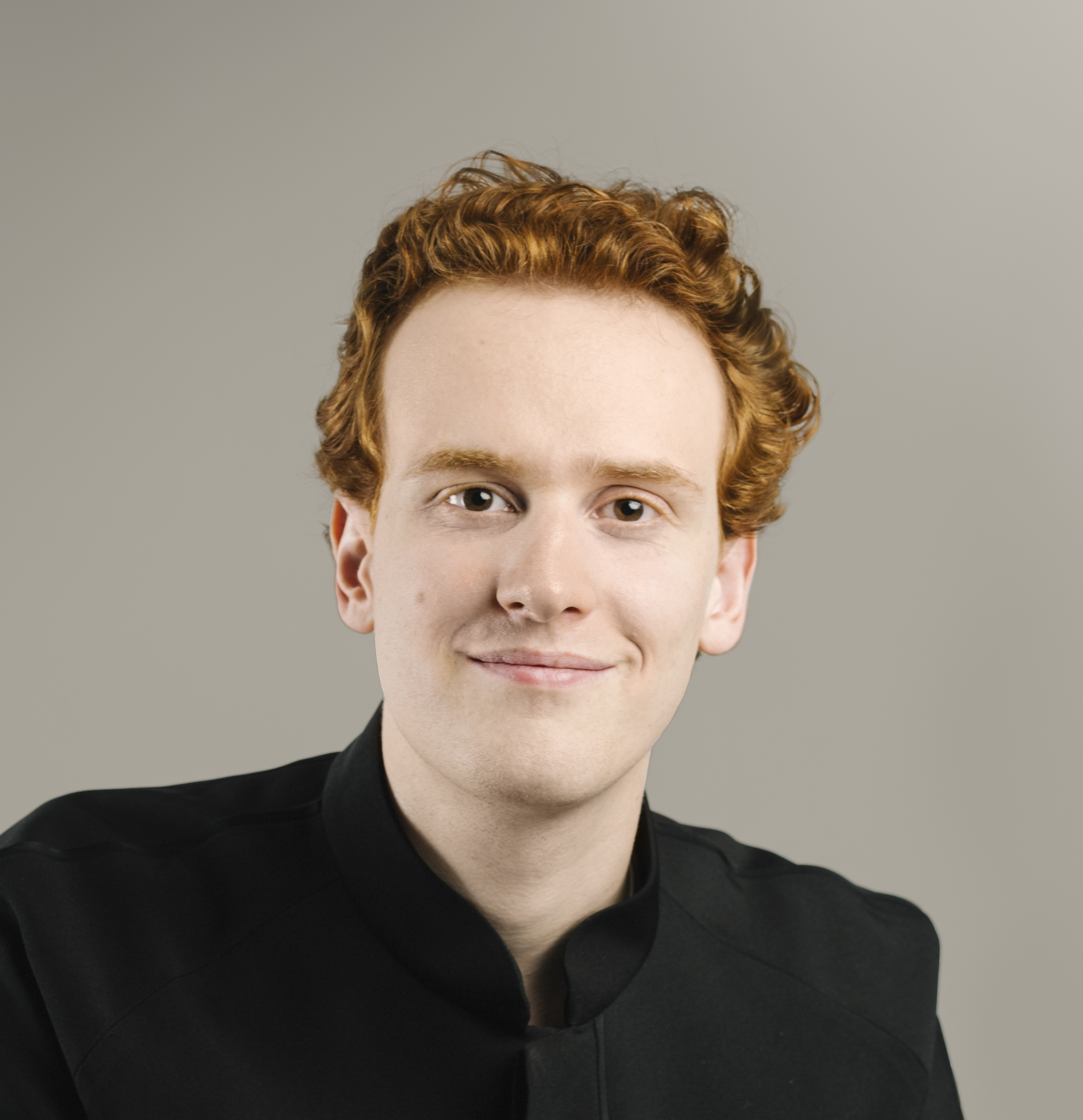

Background information
- Born: Nicolò Umberto Foron; 1998 (age 27–28); Genoa, Italy
- Genre: Classical
- Instruments: Conductor, pianist, composer
- Years active: 2016–present
- Labels: Deutsche Grammophon, AVI

Nicolò Umberto Foron (born 1998) is a German-Italian conductor, pianist and composer and Associate Principal Conductor of the Odense Symphony Orchestra (from 2028). He won the Jeunesses Musicales International Conducting Competition in 2021 and the Donatella Flick Conducting Competition in 2023, the latter leading to his appointment as assistant conductor of the London Symphony Orchestra.

== Career ==
As a symphonic conductor, Foron has conducted orchestras such as the London Symphony Orchestra, Mozarteumorchester Salzburg, Deutsches Symphonie-Orchester Berlin, Rotterdam Philharmonic Orchestra, Royal Philharmonic Orchestra, SWR Symphonieorchester, Sächsische Staatskapelle Dresden, and the Helsinki Philharmonic Orchestra. He has collaborated with soloists including Carolin Widmann, Pablo Ferrández and Emanuel Ax. In addition to his guest conducting, Foron was appointed Associate Principal Conductor of the Odense Symphony Orchestra, establishing a long-term artistic partnership to lead major symphonic programs.

Foron has performed throughout Europe, including touring with Viktoria Mullova in the spring of 2025 and with the Norwegian Arctic Philharmonic Orchestra in the summer of 2025.

Alongside his symphonic work, Foron has also conducted opera. While based in Amsterdam, he conducted multiple world premieres of operas, such as Niet de klucht van de koe at the Grachtenfestival in 2018. In July 2026 he conducted Igor Stravinsky's Pulcinella and Alfredo Casella's La favola di Orfeo in a staged production at the Festival della Valle d'Itria.

In 2021, Foron recorded Jan-Peter de Graaf's Cello Concerto with the Noord Nederlands Orkest on the album The Forest in April, which was longlisted for the German Record Critics' Award in January 2022. In 2024, he was named Artist in Residence by Deutschlandfunk, receiving the Förderpreis Deutschlandfunk and Bremer Musikfest-Preis. This residency produced a recording with the Deutsches Symphonie-Orchester Berlin of Hector Berlioz's Symphonie fantastique and Lili Boulanger's D'un soir triste, released by Deutsche Grammophon in August 2025 as a co-production with AVI Records and Deutschlandfunk. The recording was shortlisted for the Opus Klassik award in the category Young Talent of the Year 2026.

Through his role as assistant conductor of the London Symphony Orchestra, he was the assistant of chief conductor Sir Antonio Pappano. In addition to conducting, Foron performs as a pianist, including collaborations with his sister, violinist Mira Marie Foron.

== Education ==
Foron grew up between Ospedaletti, Bielefeld and Stuttgart. He studied piano with Karl-Heinz Kämmerling and Anatol Ugorski, and began conducting studies at the age of ten with Jorma Panula. At sixteen, he took part in masterclasses given by Bernard Haitink at the Lucerne Festival.

From 2014 to 2019, he studied conducting at the Conservatorium van Amsterdam with Ed Spanjaard, Lukas Vis, Jac van Steen, Antony Hermus, and Kenneth Montgomery. He went on to study at the Royal College of Music from 2019 to 2021 with Peter Stark, Howard Williams, and Toby Purser, and at the Royal Academy of Music from 2021 to 2022 with Sian Edwards.

He was a Tanglewood Music Center Conducting Fellow in 2022, studying with Andris Nelsons and Stefan Asbury, and a fellow at the Gstaad Menuhin Festival in 2023, where he studied with Jaap van Zweden, Mirga Gražinytė-Tyla, and Johannes Schlaefli.

== Discography ==
- Berlioz: Symphonie fantastique; Boulanger: D'un soir triste, with the Deutsches Symphonie-Orchester Berlin (Deutsche Grammophon, 2025)
- The Forest in April (works by Jan-Peter de Graaf), with the Noord Nederlands Orkest (TRPTK, 2022)
