= Andrew Gourlay =

British conductor (born 1982)

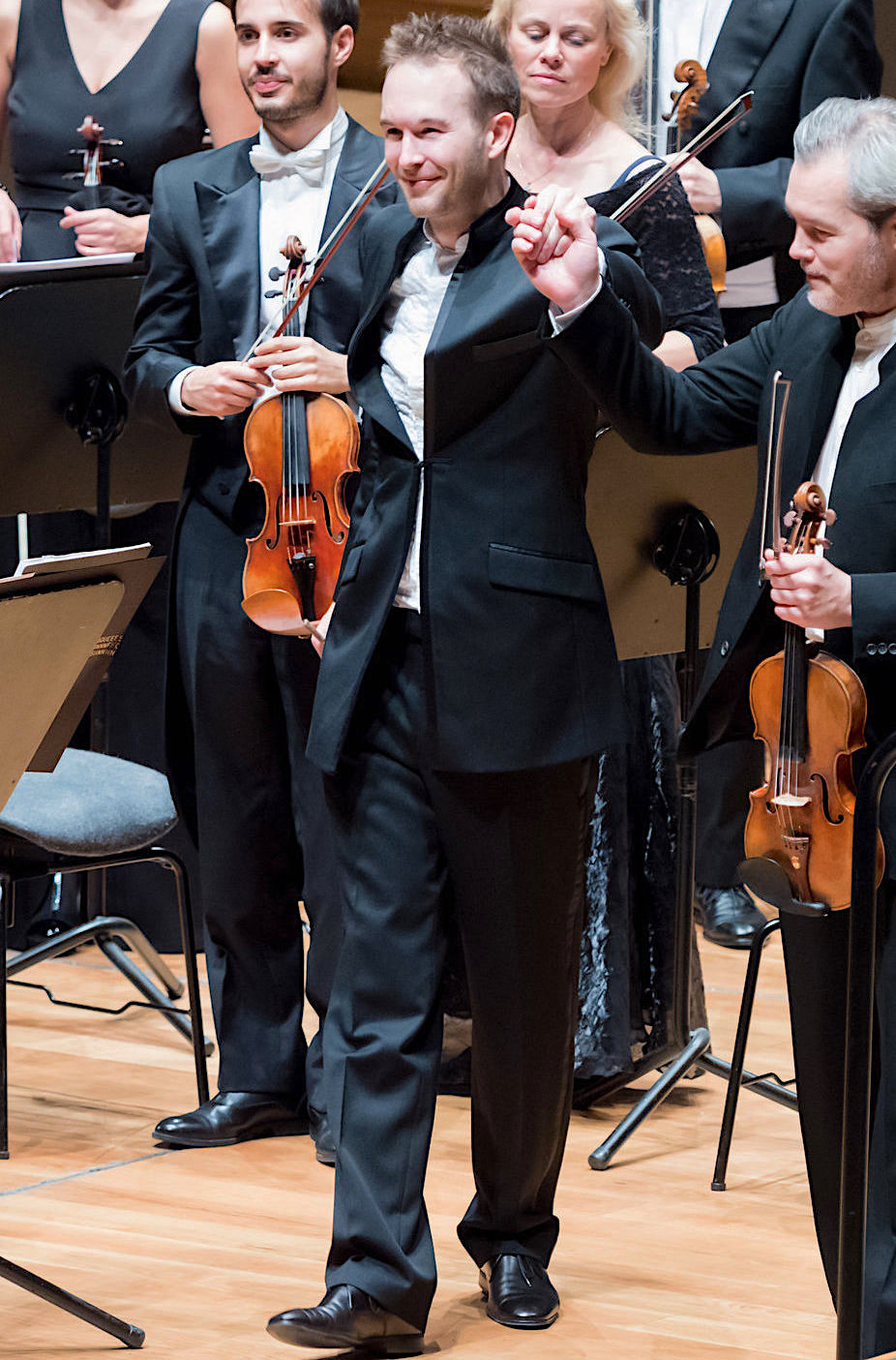
- Andrew Gourlay in 2017
- Born: 1982 (age 43–44); Jamaica
- Education: Royal Northern College of Music; University of Manchester; Royal College of Music
- Occupation: Conductor of classical music
- Website: www.andrewgourlay.com

Andrew Gourlay (born 1982) is a British conductor.

Born in Jamaica, Gourlay was subsequently raised in the Bahamas, the Philippines, Japan and the United Kingdom. He is of Russian ancestry.

Gourlay began his musical training on the piano and the trombone. As a trombonist in his early twenties, he played with such orchestras as the Philharmonia, BBC Philharmonic, BBC National Orchestra of Wales, Hallé Orchestra and the London Sinfonietta. He was a member of the Gustav Mahler Jugendorchester, with whom he played under the baton of their founder, Claudio Abbado.

Gourlay studied at the Royal Northern College of Music and University of Manchester, before specialising in conducting at the Royal College of Music in London, where he prepared orchestras for Bernard Haitink and Sir Roger Norrington. He acted as cover conductor for Kurt Masur, Valery Gergiev, Esa-Pekka Salonen, and Sir Colin Davis, twice replacing Davis at the Barbican Centre, London. In 2010, he won First Prize at the Cadaqués Orchestra International Conducting Competition. From 2010 to 2012, he was assistant conductor to Sir Mark Elder and The Hallé.

In 2014, Gourlay became Principal Guest Conductor of the Orquesta Sinfónica de Castilla y León. In 2015, the orchestra named Gourlay its Music Director, with an initial 3-year contract. This was extended until August 2020. Concert subscription increased by 45% during his tenure. Gourlay oversaw the launch in 2019 of the orchestra's in-house label, releasing its first disc of music by Rachmaninoff, followed by Shostakovich Symphony no.10, both conducted by Gourlay.

Gourlay has worked worldwide as a guest conductor. At the BBC Proms he has conducted the 40th Anniversary celebration of BBC Young Musician of the Year, multiple Proms with the London Sinfonietta, Ravel's Daphnis et Chloé and the world premiere of Wunderkammer by Danny Elfman with the National Youth Orchestra of Great Britain.

In opera, he has conducted for the Royal Opera House, Birmingham Opera Company and the Aldeburgh Festival, including critically acclaimed productions of Tippett’s The Ice Break with Sir Graham Vick in 2015 and Coult’s Violet in its 2022 premiere. In 2025, Gourlay conducted Glyndebourne's world première production of Jonathan Dove's opera "Uprising".

In 2019, Schott Music published Parsifal Suite, a 45-minute suite of orchestral music from Wagner's Parsifal, constructed by Gourlay.

Cultural offices
Preceded by Lionel Bringuier	Music Director, Orquesta Sinfónica de Castilla y León; 2016–2022	Succeeded by Thierry Fischer
