= London Design Biennale =

International design exhibition

- Status: Active
- Genre: Design exhibition
- Frequency: Biennial
- Locations: Somerset House, London, England
- Country: United Kingdom
- Years active: 2016–present
- Inaugurated: 7 September 2016
- Founder: Sir John Sorrell CBE; Ben Evans CBE
- Previous event: 2025
- Next event: 2027
- Participants: 35–50 countries, cities and territories
- Organiser: London Design Biennale Ltd
- Website: londondesignbiennale.com

London Design Biennale is an international design exhibition established in 2016 by Sir John Sorrell CBE and Ben Evans CBE. Held biennially at Somerset House in London, the event brings together countries, cities, territories and organisations to present design installations that respond to a central theme, addressing major global challenges through creative solutions.

Since its inaugural edition in 2016, the Biennale has featured over 40 pavilions in each edition, showcasing world-leading design, innovation, creativity and research by exhibitors from across the globe.

== History ==
=== Foundation ===
The London Design Biennale was founded by Sir John Sorrell CBE and Ben Evans CBE, who had previously co-founded the London Design Festival in 2003. The Biennale was established to create a platform for international design dialogue and exchange, where countries could showcase their design talent whilst addressing pressing global challenges through creative solutions.

The organisation was formally incorporated on 27 July 2015 as London Design Biennale Ltd, a private limited company registered in England and Wales.

=== Somerset House venue ===
Since its inception, the Biennale has been held at Somerset House, an 18th-century neoclassical building on the banks of the River Thames. Originally built in the late 18th century and once home to the Royal Navy, Somerset House now serves as London's working arts centre and home to the UK's largest creative community. The venue's historic architecture provides a dramatic backdrop for contemporary design installations, with exhibitions taking over the entirety of the building including the Edmond J. Safra Fountain Court and River Terrace.

== Editions ==
Edition	Dates	Theme	Artistic director	Participating pavilions	Medal winners	Notable features
1st	7–27 September 2016	Utopia by Design	Dr Christopher Turner	37 countries	London Design Biennale Medal: Lebanon; Utopia Medal: Russia; Jaguar Innovation Medal: Switzerland; Public Medal: Albania	Celebrated 500th anniversary of Thomas More's Utopia. UK pavilion 'Forecast' by Barber & Osgerby in collaboration with V&A.
2nd	4–23 September 2018	Emotional States	Dr Christopher Turner / Victoria Broackes	40 countries, cities and territories	London Design Biennale Medal: Egypt; Theme Medal: United States; Best Design Medal: Latvia; Public Medal: Guatemala; Honourable Mentions: China, Poland	US pavilion 'Face Values' by Cooper Hewitt, Smithsonian Design Museum. UK pavilion 'Maps of Defiance' curated by V&A with Forensic Architecture.
3rd	1–27 June 2021	Resonance	Es Devlin	Over 50 countries, territories and cities	London Design Biennale Medal: Chile; Theme Medal: Venezuela; Best Design Medal: Pavilion of the African Diaspora; Public Medal: Israel; Special Commendation: Germany	First major design event in London since the COVID-19 pandemic. 'Forest for Change' featuring 400 trees in Somerset House courtyard.
4th	1–25 June 2023	The Global Game: Remapping Collaborations	Het Nieuwe Instituut / Aric Chen	45 pavilions from 5 continents	London Design Biennale Medal: Poland; Theme Medal: Abu Dhabi; Best Design Medal: Taiwan; Public Medal (1st): Vietnam; Public Medal (2nd): India; Public Medal (3rd): South Korea	Introduced EUREKA exhibition showcasing design-led innovation from UK research centres.
5th	5–29 June 2025	Surface Reflections	Dr Samuel Ross MBE	Over 35 pavilions	London Design Biennale Medal: Malta; Theme Medal: Poland; Best Design Medal: Oman; Public Medal: TBC	Global Design Forum 'Design and the Invisible' at King's College London. Ross debuted large-scale sculptural works.

== Organisation and governance ==
=== Leadership ===
The London Design Biennale is led by:

- Sir John Sorrell CBE – Co-founder and President
- Ben Evans CBE – Co-founder and Executive Director
- Victoria Broackes – Director

Sir John Sorrell is a prominent British designer who served as chairman of the Design Council from 1994 to 2000 and chair of CABE (Commission for Architecture and the Built Environment) from 2004 to 2009. He was knighted in the 2008 New Year Honours for services to the creative industries.

Ben Evans is director of the London Design Festival and was appointed Commander of the Order of the British Empire (CBE) for services to the creative industries in 2019.

=== International advisory committee and jury ===
Each edition has an international advisory committee and jury of leading creative experts with a strong commitment to design. The jury is responsible for awarding medals to the most significant contributions. Past jury members include Paola Antonelli, Tristram Hunt and Lord Richard Rogers.

== Visual identity ==
The visual identity and branding for the London Design Biennale has been consistently created by Pentagram, led by creative director Domenic Lippa. The design studio has developed the identity, signage and materials for every edition since 2016, maintaining continuity whilst responding to each edition's unique theme.

For the 2018 edition themed 'Emotional States', Pentagram created a series of arresting masks inspired by Charles Darwin's seven universal emotions, handmade by paper artist Andy Singleton and photographed by John Ross.

== Associated programmes ==
=== London Design Biennale Summit ===
The Biennale has hosted summit events in partnership with Chatham House. The first summit took place in 2022, with the second in 2024, featuring sessions that provided insight into upcoming themes and explored global design challenges.

=== Design In An Age Of Crisis ===
In 2020, during the COVID-19 pandemic, the Biennale published an open call titled 'Design In An Age Of Crisis' in partnership with Chatham House. The project invited radical design thinking from the global design community, young people and the public under the themes of health, work, society and environment. Submissions were presented online and subsequently at the 2021 edition.

=== Global Design Forum ===
The Global Design Forum is an associated programme of lectures, talks, panel discussions and thought-leadership events. For the 2025 edition, the Forum took place from 10 to 12 June at King's College London under the title 'Design and the Invisible', featuring speakers including Dr Samuel Ross, Mariana Mazzucato, Kengo Kuma and Will Gompertz.

== Notable installations and collaborations ==
=== 2016: Utopia by Design ===
The inaugural edition featured several notable installations:

- United Kingdom – 'Forecast' by Edward Barber and Jay Osgerby, a 14-metre kinetic sculpture in collaboration with the Victoria and Albert Museum, evoking Britain's nautical history and renewable energy future
- Lebanon – 'Mezzing In Lebanon', awarded the inaugural London Design Biennale Medal for the most exceptional design contribution
- Russia – 'Discovering Utopia: Lost Archives of Soviet Design', awarded the Utopia Medal, featuring rediscovered archives from the All-Union Soviet Institute of Technical Aesthetics
- Switzerland – Awarded the Jaguar Innovation Medal for collaborative work between seven designers and niche industrial manufacturers

=== 2018: Emotional States ===
The second edition explored design's relationship with human emotions:

- United States – 'Face Values' by Cooper Hewitt, investigating facial recognition technology and emotion-recognition systems
- United Kingdom – 'Maps of Defiance', curated by the V&A in collaboration with Forensic Architecture, documenting cultural heritage destruction in the Sinjar area of Iraq
- Greece – 'Disobedience', a 17-metre-long kinetic wall in the courtyard challenging perceptions of design as static

=== 2021: Resonance ===
The post-pandemic edition featured:

- Forest for Change – Artistic Director Es Devlin's centrepiece installation of 400 trees in Somerset House courtyard, featuring soundscapes curated by Brian Eno and the UN's Sustainable Development Goals. The trees were subsequently replanted across London boroughs
- Chile – 'Tectonic Resonances' about the sound of rocks, exploring how geological events in Chile affect the globe
- Pavilion of the African Diaspora – Designed by Ini Archibong, providing a platform for voices and contributions of people born of the African Diaspora

=== 2023: The Global Game ===
The fourth edition experimented with collaborative formats:

- Poland – 'Poetics of Necessity', inspired by the Windows project providing reusable windows to Ukraine
- Taiwan – 'Visible Shop', celebrating the country as a trade hub and important part of the world's manufacturing supply chain
- Spain and Peru – Collaborative pavilion inspired by the 'cajón', a traditional Afro-Peruvian percussion instrument

=== 2025: Surface Reflections ===
The fifth edition, curated by Dr Samuel Ross MBE, featured several highly acclaimed installations:

- Poland – 'Records of Waiting: On Time and Ornament', presented by the Adam Mickiewicz Institute.
- Oman – 'Memory Grid (شبكة الذاكرة)', the country's debut contribution to the Biennale, awarded the Best Design Award.
- Nigeria – 'Hopes and Impediments', the country's first official national pavilion was backed by Nigeria's creative and cultural ministries.
- Japan – 'Paper Clouds: Materiality in Empty Space', designed by SEKISUI HOUSE – KUMA LAB (University of Tokyo) and curated by Clare Farrow with music composed by Midori Komachi was named best pavilion by Forbes Magazine

== Impact and reception ==
The London Design Biennale has established itself as one of the world's most significant design events, attracting hundreds of thousands of visitors across each edition. The event promotes international collaboration and demonstrates the universal relevance of design in addressing global challenges including climate change, social inequality, migration, and technological transformation.

The Biennale has been praised for creating opportunities for cross-cultural exchange and diplomatic dialogue through design. Participating countries have reported unexpected collaborations emerging from their involvement, such as the joint project between Latvian and Chilean design teams addressing coastal resilience following the 2021 edition.

As a highlight of the global design calendar, the Biennale contributes to London's status as an international hub for design excellence and creative industry, forming part of the city's broader design ecosystem alongside the London Design Festival and other events.

== See also ==
- London Design Festival
- Somerset House
- Design Museum
- Victoria and Albert Museum
- Design Council
