= Christopher Gayford =

English conductor

Christopher Gayford (born 1963) is an English conductor.

== Biography ==
Born in Wilmslow, Gayford studied at the Royal College of Music and the Royal Northern College of Music. His international career started after winning the second place of the Cadaqués Orchestra International Conducting Competition and sharing a first prize at the International Besançon Competition for Young Conductors. These competitions led to conducting engagements in Spain, Austria, Germany, Poland, Italy Australia and France.

He served as assistant conductor of the Royal Liverpool Philharmonic Orchestra and has been invited to conduct the Orchestra of the Royal Opera House, BBC Philharmonic, BBC Scottish Symphony Orchestra, Vienna Chamber Orchestra, BBC Concert Orchestra, Britten Sinfonia, and Opera North among others. He currently conducts the City of Sheffield Youth Orchestra.

He has been a research fellow at the Trinity College of Music, collaborating with psychologists in the research of “expressivity in performance and the processes through which music triggers emotion”.
