= Cadaqués Orchestra =

Spanish chamber orchestra

The Cadaqués Orchestra (Orquesta de Cadaqués [Spanish]; Orquestra de Cadaqués [Catalan]) is a chamber orchestra based in Cadaqués, Catalonia, Spain. Founded in 1988 to be the resident orchestra of the Cadaqués Festival, the orchestra has since become an established orchestra with a regular concert season. The orchestra hosts the Cadaqués Orchestra International Conducting Competition, which occurs every two years. The orchestra gives concerts in several cities and venues in Spain, including the following:

- Cornellà de Llobregat, Auditori
- Figueres, Teatre el Jardí
- Girona, Auditori de Girona
- Lleida, Auditori Municipal Enric Granados
- Madrid, Auditorio Nacional
- Terrassa, Auditori Centre Cultural Unnim
- Viladecans, Atrium Viladecans
- Vilafranca, Auditori Municipal de Vilafranca,
- Zaragoza, Auditorio de Zaragoza

Gianandrea Noseda became principal conductor of the orchestra in 1994, after winning the Cadaqués Orchestra International Conducting Competition in the same year. The orchestra's principal guest conductor was Sir Neville Marriner. In February 2011, the orchestra announced the appointment of Jaime Martín, a founding member of and flutist in the orchestra, as co-chief conductor, in tandem with Noseda.

== Principal conductors ==
- Gianandrea Noseda (1994–present)
- Jaime Martín (2011–present)
