= Midori Komachi =

Midori Komachi 小町碧
- Born: 1988 (age 37–38); Kanagawa Prefecture, Japan
- Origin: London, United Kingdom
- Genres: Classical music, Contemporary classical music
- Occupations: Violinist, composer, translator, radio presenter
- Instrument: Violin
- Years active: 1990s–present
- Labels: MusiKaleido, Nonclassical
- Website: midorikomachi.com

Midori Komachi (小町碧, Komachi Midori; b.1988; pronounced [komaꜜtɕi midoɾi]) is a Japanese violinist, composer, translator and radio presenter based in London. She is internationally recognised for bridging traditional and contemporary music of the United Kingdom and Japan, and for her interdisciplinary work combining music with visual arts, architecture and cultural heritage.

== Early life and education ==
Komachi was born in Kanagawa Prefecture, Japan, and moved abroad at the age of three. She grew up in Hong Kong and Switzerland, moving to the United Kingdom at age 15 to study independently.

She began violin studies at age seven. At age 11, she commenced studies at the Basel Academy of Music under Adelina Oprean. The following year, at age 12, she made her orchestral debut performing with the Zurich Chamber Orchestra conducted by Howard Griffiths.

Komachi graduated with first-class honours from the Royal Academy of Music in London.

She holds an AHRC-funded PhD from Goldsmiths, University of London, with a research on the intersections of music, space and cultural heritage. She is also an adjunct lecturer at Queen's University, Canada.

== Career ==
=== Performance ===
As a solo violinist, Komachi has performed extensively throughout Europe and Japan at prestigious venues including Tonhalle Zürich, the Warsaw Philharmonic Concert Hall, and Wigmore Hall.

In April 2014, she gave a recital at British House Yokohama, performing works by Ralph Vaughan Williams, Gustav Holst, Hubert Parry, Benjamin Britten and her own English folksong arrangements.

In March 2024, Komachi embarked on a UK tour titled "On an Endless Road: Ito Noe and the Women Composers of Her Time", with performances at the Actors' Church in Covent Garden, the University of Huddersfield, the University of Manchester, and the Howard Assembly Room in Leeds.

=== Delius research and advocacy ===
In 2012, Komachi launched a concert project sponsored by the Courtauld Institute of Art based on her research theme "Delius and Gauguin". The concert series subsequently toured London, Cambridge and Tokyo. In 2013, she was honoured by the Delius Society of the United Kingdom.

In 2014, Komachi received funding from Arts Council England to record her debut album "Delius and Gauguin" and undertake a UK tour.

In 2017, she published her Japanese translation of Eric Fenby's memoir Delius as I Knew Him (Song of Summer: The Real Delius), released by Artes Publishing. She subsequently developed the "Delius Project" with music journalist Hayashi Naoki, which included various events and CD releases.

=== British music scholarship and translation ===
Komachi is a bilingual writer and translator specialising in English and Japanese music. In 2022, she co-translated (with Nobuya Takahashi) Simon Heffer's biography Vaughan Williams into Japanese, published by Artes Publishing.

She regularly contributes columns and articles to Japanese music publications, including a series titled "Journey through British Music" in ONTOMO Music Magazine (Ongaku No Tomo Publishing).

In May 2022, Komachi appeared on BBC Radio 3's "Vaughan Williams Today" programme discussing the composer's work.

=== Composition and sound installation ===
Komachi works extensively in composition and immersive sound installation, collaborating with architects, designers and visual artists. Since 2017, she has collaborated with MSCTY, founded by Nick Luscombe, on creating sound installations and original music for major brands including LUSH and OPPO.

Her commissioned works include:

- 2017: "Life" for Maggie's Centres UK, premiered at Christie's London photographic exhibition "LIFE" and subsequently performed at the Welsh Parliament Senedd building in 2018.
- 2018: "Full as Deep" for Musicity x Sculpture in the City, installed at Undershaft in the City of London.
- 2019: Spa treatment music for LUSH "Tangled Hair" product.
- 2021: "Bamboo Ring" for Milan Design Week, a collaboration with architect Kengo Kuma and OPPO.
- 2024: Commission by Sound and Music for the SoundEscapes project at the Sainsbury Centre for Visual Arts, creating a composition inspired by Leiko Ikemura's sculpture "Usagi Kannon".
- 2025: Composer and sound designer for the Japan Pavilion "Paper Clouds: Materiality in Empty Space" at the London Design Biennale 2025, which was selected as "best pavilion" by Forbes.
- 2025: Music & Audio Content Editor for the UK Pavilion "Come Build the Future" at the Expo 2025 in Osaka, Japan, working with Immersive International, composer Benedic Lamdin and sound designer Simon Little.

==== London Design Biennale 2025 ====
For the Japan Pavilion at the London Design Biennale 2025, Komachi composed music for "Paper Clouds: Materiality in Empty Space", designed by SEKISUI HOUSE – KUMA LAB (University of Tokyo) and curated by Clare Farrow. The installation occupied Somerset House's historic Nelson Stair, featuring cloud-like structures made from Washi paper.

Komachi's composition incorporated the sounds of Washi paper interacting with the body, inspired by the Japanese concept of Sawari – the distinctive sound created by friction on surfaces. The project included live musical performances, with Komachi wearing a recyclable Washi paper dress inspired by traditional Japanese armour, designed by fashion designer Toshiki Hirano.

The project also provided educational opportunities through a workshop with the London Music Fund's Senior Scholars, who subsequently performed alongside Komachi in live performances throughout the Biennale.

==== Chashitsu: Auditory Tea Room ====
In October 2025, Komachi premiered her album and live performance project Chashitsu: Auditory Tea Room at the Royal Albert Hall's Elgar Room. The sold-out performance, created in collaboration with MSCTY founder and producer Nick Luscombe, drew inspiration from Chashitsu (Japanese Tea Room) and Chadō (the Way of Tea).

The album was praised by A Closer Listen, which described it as "an instantly endearing release" that "translates the principles of the Japanese tea ceremony into silence and sound".

=== Broadcasting and media ===
==== BBC Radio 3 ====
In 2018, Komachi served as adviser for BBC Radio 3's Japanese music series "Night Blossoms". For the documentary programme "Music Matters", she conducted fieldwork in Japan and provided simultaneous interpretation, working with music journalist Tom Service to introduce various artists active in Japanese traditional music, contemporary music and video game music.

Komachi has appeared on BBC Radio 3's "In Tune" (2014) and other programmes discussing British and Japanese music.

==== British Airways ====
In December 2018, Komachi began presenting the audio programme "Midori Selects" for British Airways' in-flight entertainment system, which continued into subsequent years.

==== Other media ====
Komachi has appeared on Japanese radio programmes including Blue Radio.com's "Café Figaro" (2015), OTTAVA (2017), and ANA World Air Current (2019).

=== International residencies ===
From 2019, Komachi served as artist-in-residence for the British Council in partnership with the PRS Foundation. She developed a project with Diamantina, Brazil, a UNESCO World Heritage Site. In 2020–2021, the residency continued in digital format during the COVID-19 pandemic.

== Discography ==
=== Albums ===
- Delius and Gauguin (2014) – MusiKaleido
- Warp & Weft (2017) - EM Records
- Vaughan Williams: Complete Works for Violin and Piano (2022) - MusiKaleido
- Chashitsu: Auditory Tea Room (2025) – MSCTY

=== Selected compositions ===
- "Tranquility" (2018) – Nonclassical [NONCLSS026]
- "Song of Koki-riko" (2018) – Nonclassical [NONCLSS026]
- "Window" (2020) – Nonclassical [NONCLSS]

== Publications ==
=== Translations ===
- Song of Summer: The Real Delius by Eric Fenby, translated by Midori Komachi, supervised by Daisaku Mukai (Artes Publishing, 2017) ISBN 978-4-86559-171-2
- Vaughan Williams by Simon Heffer, co-translated by Midori Komachi and Nobuya Takahashi (Artes Publishing, 2022) ISBN 978-4-86559-267-2

=== Columns and articles ===
- "Journey through British Music" – ONTOMO Music Magazine (Ongaku No Tomo Publishing)
- "Musician's Bookshelf" – Ongaku No Tomo Music Magazine (August edition)

== Honours and appointments ==
- 2013 – Honoured by the Delius Society of the United Kingdom
- 2019–2021 – Musician-in-Residence, British Council & PRS Foundation
- 2024–present – Adjunct Lecturer, Queen's University, Canada
- 2025–present – Ambassador, London Music Fund
- 2021-2026 – PhD, Goldsmiths, University of London (AHRC-funded)
