= Nuno Coelho (conductor) =

Portuguese conductor

- Born: 1989; Porto, Portugal
- Education: Zurich University of the Arts
- Occupation: Conductor
- Organizations: Orquesta Sinfónica del Principado de Asturias
- Website: www.nunocoelhoconductor.com

Nuno Coelho is a Portuguese conductor who made an international career.

== Life and career ==
Born in Porto in 1989, Coelho studied conducting at the Zurich University of the Arts with Johannes Schlaefli. He was assistant conductor of the Netherlands Philharmonic Orchestra from 2015 to 2017, working with Marc Albrecht including a production of Wagner's Parsifal at the Dutch National Opera and conducting several concerts. He won the Cadaqués Orchestra International Conducting Competition in 2017. From 2022 Coelho has been conductor of the Orquesta Sinfónica del Principado de Asturias.
