= Gianandrea Noseda =

Italian conductor (born 1964)

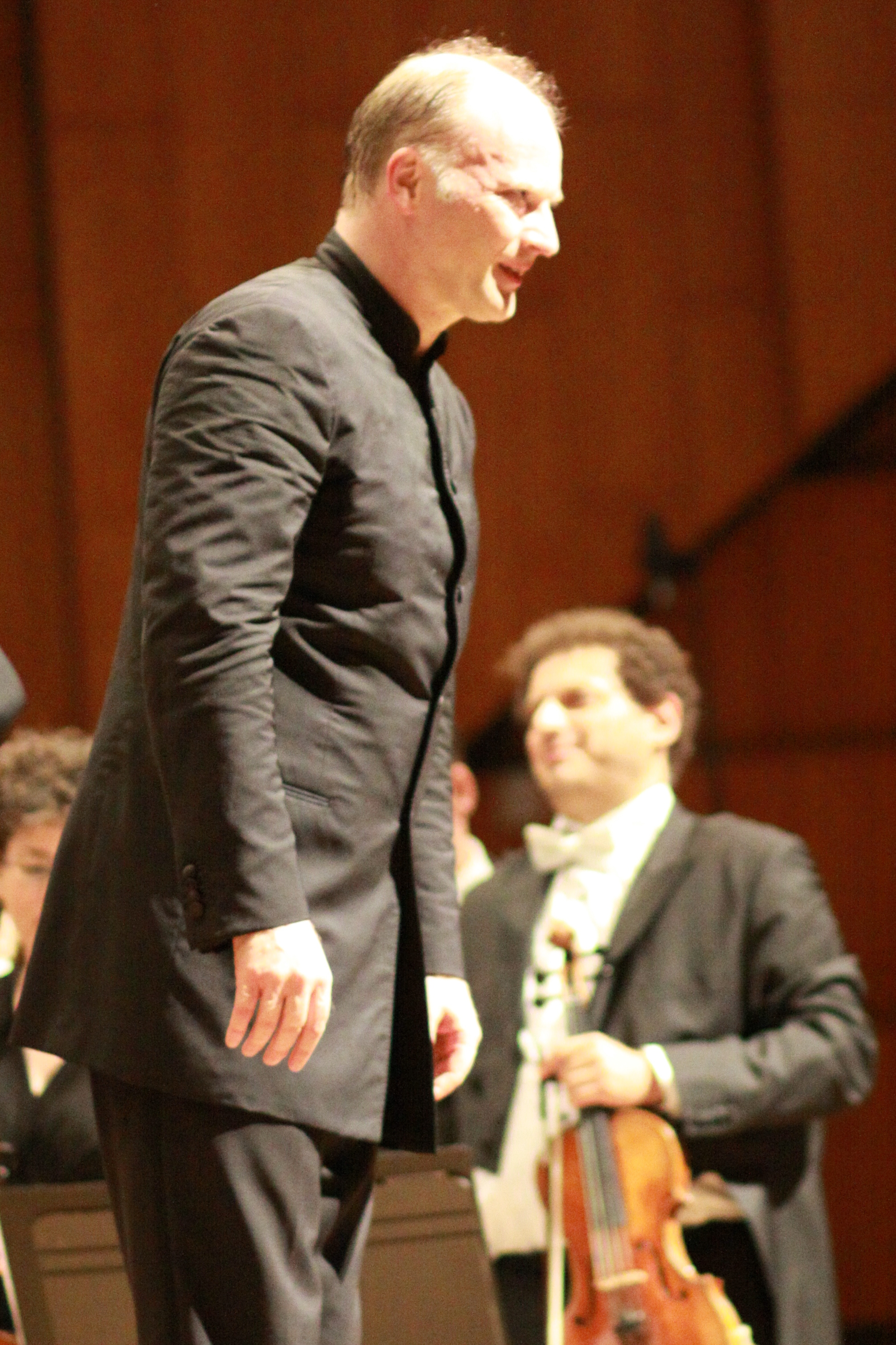
- Born: 23 April 1964 (age 62); Sesto San Giovanni, Metropolitan City of Milan, Italy
- Occupation: Conductor
- Organizations: BBC Philharmonic; Teatro Regio di Torino; National Symphony Orchestra; Zürich Opera

Gianandrea Noseda (born 23 April 1964) is an Italian conductor. He is currently the music director of the National Symphony Orchestra in Washington, D.C., general music director (Generalmusikdirektor) of Zurich Opera, principal guest conductor of the London Symphony Orchestra, and music director of the Tsinandali Festival in Tsinandali, Georgia.

== Biography ==
Noseda was born in Sesto San Giovanni in the City of Milan, Italy. He studied piano and composition in Milan and graduated from the Milan Conservatory. He began conducting studies at age 27. He furthered his conducting studies with Donato Renzetti, Myung-Whun Chung and Valery Gergiev. His professional conducting debut was in 1994 with the Orchestra Sinfonica di Milano Giuseppe Verdi.

In 1994, Noseda won the Cadaqués Orchestra International Conducting Competition and became principal conductor of the Cadaqués Orchestra in the same year. He became principal guest conductor at the Mariinsky Theatre in St Petersburg in 1997. He has also served as principal guest conductor of the Rotterdam Philharmonic Orchestra and artistic director of the Settimane Musicali di Stresa e del Lago Maggiore Festival in Italy. In 2001, he became artistic director of the Stresa Festival in Italy. In 2007, Noseda became music director of the Teatro Regio di Torino. Noseda led the Teatro Regio di Torino on its first North American tour in December 2014 which included a performance at Carnegie Hall. In April 2018, Noseda submitted his resignation from the Teatro Regio music directorship.

In December 2001, Noseda was named principal conductor of the BBC Philharmonic, and assumed the post in September 2002. In July 2003, Noseda extended his contract with the orchestra to 2008. He and the BBC Philharmonic participated in a 2005 BBC Radio 3 project in which over there were over 1.5 million downloads of live performances of the nine symphonies of Beethoven from Manchester. In October 2006, Noseda extended his contract for another two years and his title was changed to chief conductor. He concluded his BBC Philharmonic tenure after the 2010–2011 season and subsequently took the title of conductor laureate. In February 2016, the London Symphony Orchestra announced the appointment of Noseda as its new co-principal guest conductor, effective with the 2016–2017 season.

Outside of the UK, Noseda held the Victor de Sabata Guest Conductor Chair with the Pittsburgh Symphony Orchestra, for a designated term of 4 seasons. He served as principal guest conductor of the Israel Philharmonic from May 2011 to 2020. In 2011, Noseda first guest-conducted the National Symphony Orchestra (NSO; Washington, D.C.), and returned in November 2015 for an additional guest engagement. In January 2016, the NSO appointed Noseda as its next music director, effective with the 2017–2018 season, with an initial contract of four seasons. In September 2018, the NSO announced the extension of Noseda's contract through the 2024–2025 season. In June 2022, the NSO announced a further extension of Noseda's contract through the 2026–2027 season. In March 2025, the NSO announced its most recent contract extension for Noseda, through 2031.

Noseda first conducted at Zürich Opera in May 2017, in a production of Prokofiev's The Fiery Angel, and subsequently returned for a further guest engagement with Verdi's Macbeth. In July 2018, Zürich Opera announced the appointment of Noseda as its next Generalmusikdirektor (GMD), effective in 2021 and included an announcement about Noseda's first time leading a Wagner Ring Cycle. In October 2022, Zürich Opera announced an extension of Noseda's contract with the company through the 2027–2028 season. Noseda is scheduled to conclude his tenure as GMD of Zürich Opera at the close of the 2027–2028 season.

In 2019, Noseda became founding music director of the Tsinandali Festival and the Pan-Caucasian Youth Orchestra in Tsinandali, Georgia. As a guest conductor, Noseda has also led opera productions at the Edinburgh Festival, Maggio Musicale Fiorentino, Metropolitan Opera House, Teatro alla Scala, Royal Opera House, Salzburg Festival.

Noseda has conducted many recordings with the BBC Philharmonic for the Chandos label, of Prokofiev, Dallapiccola (including the world premiere recording of Dallapiccola's Partita), Dvořák, Liszt, Karłowicz, Casella, Shostakovich, Rachmaninoff, and Respighi. Noseda is recording a complete Shostakovich Cycle with the London Symphony Orchestra. He is also recording a complete Beethoven Symphony Cycle and the Five Sinfonias by George Walker for the National Symphony Orchestra's recording label.

Noseda holds the honour of Commendatore al Merito della Repubblica Italiana, for his contributions to the artistic life of Italy. He was the recipient of the 'Conductor of the Year' award from Musical America, for 2015. The International Opera Awards named him "Best Conductor" in 2016. In February 2023, Noseda was recognized as "Best Conductor" by the Oper! Awards 2023.

Cultural offices
Preceded by Yan Pascal Tortelier	Chief Conductor, BBC Philharmonic; 2002–2011	Succeeded by Juanjo Mena
Preceded by Fabio Luisi	Generalmusikdirektor, Zurich Opera; 2021–present	Succeeded by incumbent
