= IX Sydney International Piano Competition =

Piano competition in Australia

The IX Sydney International Piano Competition took place at the Seymour Centre in Sydney from 16 July to 2 August 2008.

It was won by Konstantin Shamray.

== Jury ==
- (Australia) Warren Thomson (chairman)
- (Australia) Michael Brimer
- (Georgia (country)) Manana Doidjashvili
- (Argentina) Aquiles Delle Vigne
- (United Kingdom) Norma Fisher
- (South Korea) Choong-Mo Kang
- (Australia) Ian Munro
- (Israel) Arie Vardi
- (China) Zhou Guangren

== Prizes ==
	Winner
1st Grand Prize	(Russia) Konstantin Shamray
2nd Prize	(Russia) Tatyana Kolesova
3rd Prize	(Israel) Ran Dank
4th Prize	(Japan) Takashi Sato
5th Prize	(Japan) Tomoki Kitamura
6th Prize	(United States) Eric Zuber
Australian SQ engagement	(Russia) Konstantin Shamray
People's Choice Prize	(Russia) Konstantin Shamray
Best Female competitor	(Russia) Tatyana Kolesova
Best Australian competitor	(Australia) Hoang Pham
Best Australian Music performance	(Japan) Tomoki Kitamura
Best Mozart Concerto performance	(Russia) Konstantin Shamray
Best overall Concerto performance	(Israel) Ran Dank
Best 19th/20th century Concerto performance	(Russia) Konstantin Shamray
Best Beethoven performance	(Russia) Konstantin Shamray
Best Chopin performance	(Japan) Takashi Sato
Best Liszt performance	(United States) Eric Zuber
Best Liszt Study performance	(United States) Charlie Albright
Best Rachmaninoff performance	(Israel) Ran Dank
Best Chamber Music performance	(Russia) Tatyana Kolesova
Best Mozart performance	(Russia) Konstantin Shamray
Best Schubert performance	(Japan) Tomoki Kitamura
Best Debussy Prélude performance	(Israel) Ran Dank
Best Russian Music performance	(Russia) Tatyana Kolesova
Best Romantic Music overall performance	(South Korea) Yoonsoo Rhee
Best Haydn Sonata performance	(South Korea) Yoonsoo Rhee
Lev Vlassenko Memorial Prize	(Kazakhstan) Daniil Tsvetkov
I Round Encouragement Award	(China) Feng Zhang
Quarter-Finals Encouragement Award	(Australia) Alexei Yemtsov
Semi-finals Encouragement Award	(Italy) Shizuka Susanna Salvemini
Youngest finalist	(Japan) Tomoki Kitamura
Youngest Australian competitor	(Australia) Hoang Pham

== Works commissioned for the competition ==
- Andrew Ford - Thin air
- Roger Smalley - Morceau de Concours

== Competition results (by rounds) ==
=== First round ===
16–17 July 2008

- (United States) Charlie Albright
- (Italy) Fernando Altamura
- (Portugal) Manuel Araujo
- (Italy) Marco Ciampi
- (United States) Sean Chen
- (Israel) Ran Dank
- (United Kingdom) Christopher Devine
- (Australia) John Fisher
- (Hungary) Balázs Fülei
- (Australia) David Fung
- (Australia) Adam Herd
- (Russia) Elizaveta Ivanova
- (Italy) Shizuka Susanna Salvemini
- (Japan) Miya Kazauka
- (Japan) Tomoki Kitamura
- (Russia) Tatyana Kolesova
- (Russia) Eduard Kunz
- (Hong Kong) Ka-Ling Colleen Lee
- (South Korea) Miyeon Lee
- (United States) Ryan McEvoy McCullough
- (Spain) José Menor Martín
- (Australia) Hoang Pham
- (South Korea) Yoonsoo Rhee
- (Russia) Sergey Saratovsky
- (Japan) Takashi Sato
- (Russia) Konstantin Shamray
- (South Korea) Yekwon Sunwoo
- (Kazakhstan) Daniil Tsvetkov
- (Italy) Mariangela Vacatello
- (China) Xun Wang
- (Poland) Wojciech Wisniewski
- (Australia) Alexei Yemtsov
- (Taiwan) Chun-Chieh Yen
- (China) Feng Zhang
- (China) Xi-Xi Zhou
- (China) Hao Zhu
- (United States) Eric Zuber

=== Quarterfinals ===
21–22 July 2008

- (United States) Charlie Albright
- (Italy) Fernando Altamura
- (United States) Sean Chen
- (Israel) Ran Dank
- (United Kingdom) Christopher Devine
- (Australia) David Fung
- (Japan) Tomoki Kitamura
- (Russia) Tatyana Kolesova
- (South Korea) Miyeon Lee
- (Spain) José Menor Martín
- (Australia) Hoang Pham
- (South Korea) Yoonsoo Rhee
- (Italy) Shizuka Susanna Salvemini
- (Russia) Sergey Saratovsky
- (Japan) Takashi Sato
- (Russia) Konstantin Shamray
- (Kazakhstan) Daniil Tsvetkov
- (Italy) Mariangela Vacatello
- (Australia) Alexei Yemtsov
- (China) Hao Zhu
- (United States) Eric Zuber

=== Semifinals ===
23–25 July 2008

- (United States) Charlie Albright
- (Israel) Ran Dank
- (Japan) Tomoki Kitamura
- (Russia) Tatyana Kolesova
- (South Korea) Miyeon Lee
- (Australia) Hoang Pham
- (Italy) Shizuka Susanna Salvemini
- (Japan) Takashi Sato
- (Russia) Konstantin Shamray
- (Kazakhstan) Daniil Tsvetkov
- (Italy) Mariangela Vacatello
- (United States) Eric Zuber

=== Final ===
29 July – 2 August 2008

- Concertos
  - (Israel) Ran Dank — Mozart: 20th, Prokofiev: 3rd
  - (Japan) Tomoki Kitamura — Mozart: 17th, Beethoven: 4th
  - (Russia) Tatyana Kolesova — Mozart: 20th, Saint-Saëns: 2nd
  - (Japan) Takashi Sato — Mozart: 27th, Beethoven: 5th
  - (Russia) Konstantin Shamray — Mozart: 27th; Prokofiev: 2nd
  - (United States) Eric Zuber — Mozart: 20th, Tchaikovsky: 1st
