= X Sydney International Piano Competition =

The 10th Sydney International Piano Competition took place at Sydney's Seymour Centre and Opera House from 4 to 21 July 2012 and it was contested by 36 pianists from 14 countries. Avan Yu won the competition, while Nikolay Khozyainov and Dmitry Onishchenko were awarded the 2nd and 3rd prizes.

== Jury ==
- (Australia) Warren Thomson (chairman)
- (Australia) Michael Brimer
- (Georgia (country)) Manana Doidjashvili
- (Argentina) Aquiles Delle Vigne
- (United Kingdom) Norma Fisher
- (South Korea) Choong-Mo Kang
- (Austria) Heinz Medjimorec
- (Australia) Ian Munro
- (Australia) Phillip Shovk
- (Israel) Arie Vardi

== Prizes ==
	Winner
1st Grand Prize	(Canada) Avan Yu
2nd Prize	(Russia) Nikolay Khozyainov
3rd Prize	(Ukraine) Dmitry Onishchenko
4th Prize	(Russia) Mikhail Berestnev
5th Prize	(China) Hao Zhu
6th Prize	(United States) Tanya Gabrielian
Australian SQ engagement	(Ukraine) Dmitry Onishchenko
Best Liszt performance	(Russia) Nikolay Khozyainov
Best Australian competitor	(Australia) James Guan
Best performance of an Australian work	(Ukraine) Dmitry Onishchenko
Best Mozart Concerto performance	(Canada) Avan Yu
People's Choice Prize	(Russia) Nikolay Khozyainov
Best 19th/20th century Concerto performance	(Canada) Avan Yu
Best Beethoven performance	(Canada) Avan Yu
Best Chopin performance	(China) Hao Zhu
Best performance of a Liszt Study	(Russia) Nikolay Khozyainov
Best overall Concerto performance	(Russia) Nikolay Khozyainov
Best Ravel performance	(Canada) Avan Yu
Best Rachmaninoff performance	(United States) Tanya Gabrielian
Best Chamber Music performance	(Canada) Avan Yu
Best Mozart performance	(Japan) Tomoaki Yoshida
Best Schubert performance	(Russia) Nikolay Khozyainov
Best performance of a Russian work	(Russia) Mikhail Berestnev
Best performance of a Romantic work	(Canada) Avan Yu
People's Choice Encouragement Prize	(Canada) Avan Yu
Quarter-Finals Encouragement Award	(Belarus) Maya Irgalina
Best Performance of a Haydn Sonata	(Canada) Avan Yu
Best Performance of a Debussy Prélude	(Ukraine) Dmitry Onishchenko
Best Performance of a Clementi Sonata	not awarded
Stage I-II Encouragement Award	(China) Feng Bian
Lev Vlassenko Memorial Prize	(Russia) Nikolay Khozyainov
Semi-Finals Encouragement Award	not awarded
Youngest finalist	(Russia) Nikolay Khozyainov
Youngest Australian competitor	(Australia) Alex Raineri
Best Female competitor	(United States) Tanya Gabrielian

== Works commissioned for the competition ==
- Anne Boyd - Kabarli Meditation (Dawn)
- Carl Vine - Toccatissimo

== Competition results (by rounds) ==
=== First and Second Round ===
5–8 July 2012

- (Latvia) Arta Arnicāne
- (Russia) Mikhail Berestnev
- (China) Feng Bian
- (Italy) Giulio Biddau
- (Australia) Stefan Cassomenos
- (China) Wei Cao
- (Ukraine) Angelika Fuchs
- (United States) Tanya Gabrielian
- (Australia) James Guan
- (Italy) Stefano Guarascio
- (Japan) Atsushi Imada
- (Belarus) Maya Irgalina
- (Russia) Elizaveta Ivanova
- (China) Wenbin Jin
- (Australia) Joanne Kang
- (Russia) Nikolay Khozyainov
- (China) Jin-Hong Li
- (China) Brian Yuebing Lin
- (China) Ke Lin
- (Australia) Aaron Liu
- (Italy) Ilaria Locatelli
- (Australia) Konrad Olszewski
- (Ukraine) Dmitry Onishchenko
- (Ukraine) Olga Paliy
- (Greece) Marios Panteliadis
- (Thailand) Poom Prommachart
- (Australia) Alex Raineri
- (China) Lu Shen
- (China) Yifan Sun
- (France) Benoît Tourette
- (United States) Sean Yeh
- (South Korea) Jung-Yeon Yim
- (China) Qian Yong
- (Japan) Tomoaki Yoshida
- (Canada) Avan Yu
- (China) Hao Zhu

=== Quarterfinals ===
9-10 July 2012

- (Latvia) Arta Arnicāne
- (Russia) Mikhail Berestnev
- (Italy) Giulio Biddau
- (China) Wei Cao
- (United States) Tanya Gabrielian
- (Australia) James Guan
- (Italy) Stefano Guarascio
- (Japan) Atsushi Imada
- (Belarus) Maya Irgalina
- (Russia) Elizaveta Ivanova
- (Russia) Nikolay Khozyainov
- (China) Jin-Hong Li
- (Ukraine) Dmitry Onishchenko
- (Ukraine) Olga Paliy
- (China) Lu Shen
- (United States) Sean Yeh
- (China) Qian Yong
- (Japan) Tomoaki Yoshida
- (Canada) Avan Yu
- (China) Hao Zhu

=== Semifinals ===
11-13 July 2012

- (Latvia) Arta Arnicāne
- (Russia) Mikhail Berestnev
- (Italy) Giulio Biddau
- (United States) Tanya Gabrielian
- (Italy) Stefano Guarascio
- (Russia) Nikolay Khozyainov
- (China) Jin-Hong Li
- (Ukraine) Dmitry Onishchenko
- (China) Lu Shen
- (Japan) Tomoaki Yoshida
- (Canada) Avan Yu
- (China) Hao Zhu

=== Final ===
17-21 July 2012

- Concerti
  - (Russia) Mikhail Berestnev — Mozart: 21st, Rachmaninoff: Rhapsody on a Theme of Paganini
  - (United States) Tanya Gabrielian — Mozart: 21st, Tchaikovsky: 1st
  - (Russia) Nikolay Khozyainov — Mozart: 21st, Rachmaninoff: 3rd
  - (Ukraine) Dmitry Onishchenko — Mozart: 17th, Rachmaninoff: 3rd
  - (Canada) Avan Yu — Mozart: 17th, Rachmaninoff: Rhapsody on a Theme of Paganini
  - (China) Hao Zhu — Mozart: 24th, Rachmaninoff: 2nd
