= Sydney International Piano Competition =

Music competition broadcast live throughout Australia

- Awarded for: Exceptional piano performance
- Country: Australia
- Presented by: Sydney International Piano Competition
- Formerly called: Sydney International Piano Competition of Australia
- First award: 1977; 49 years ago
- Website: http://www.thesydney.com.au

The Sydney International Piano Competition is a music competition, presented in Sydney and broadcast live throughout Australia and internationally. It is held every four years, over a three-week period in July–August, and is internationally recognised as one of the world's great piano competitions.

The competition was established in July 1977 by Claire Dan, with co-founders Rex Hobcroft and Robert Tobias, and was admitted as a member of the World Federation of International Music Competitions in 1978.

The competition due to be held in 1989 was brought forward to 1988, to coincide with the Australian Bicentenary. The competition due in 2020 was postponed to 2021 due to the COVID-19 epidemic, and was held as a pre-recorded online competition rather than live performances. There was another edition in 2023, and the 50th Anniversary edition will be held in 2027.

The artistic director from its inception until 2015 was Warren Thomson, who also served as chairman of the jury from 1992 until 2012. In April 2015, following Thomson's death in February, Piers Lane (a former competitor and juror) was announced as the artistic director of the 2016 competition.

== Structure ==
A total of 32 (originally 36) pianists are selected to participate in the competition. Worldwide auditions are held to select the entrants, who must be aged between 18 and 32. Traditionally, the previous winner presents a Gala Opening recital.

=== Rounds ===
The competition consists of three stages – preliminaries, semi finals and finals. All 32 competitors appear in the preliminaries which consists of two rounds. Round 1 of the preliminaries is a 20-minute solo recital and round 2 is a 30-minute recital. Competitors must include an Australian work in one of these rounds. The organisers have collaborated with Australian Music Centre to compile a list of suggested works by Australian pianists. Miriam Hyde's Valley of Rocks was one of the pieces set for the 1988 competition; it was chosen by 23 of the contestants, and it went on to become her best-known work.

After the preliminary rounds, the best 12 are chosen to proceed to the Semi Finals which consists of two rounds - Semi Final Round 1 is a 65-minute recital and Semi Final Round 2 is a set chamber concert. In the 13th competition, contestants performed with either a violin or cello. Six competitors advance to the finals, again consisting of two rounds, in which they play two piano concertos with the Sydney Symphony Orchestra. In the 13th competition, Finalists played a Concerto written before 1800 in Finals Round 1 and a piano concerto written after 1800 in Finals Round 2.

=== Venues ===
Until 2016, the first stages took place at the Seymour Centre, University of Sydney. In 2016 the venue was changed to Verbrugghen Hall, Sydney Conservatorium of Music. The final stage is held in the Concert Hall of the Sydney Opera House except in 2020 when the finals will be held at the Sydney Town Hall due to renovations at the Sydney Opera House.

=== Broadcast ===
Until 2020, all stages were broadcast live on radio throughout Australia and to the world online, by ABC Classic FM. In 2020, ABC Classic considered the Sydney International Piano Competition one of its highlights of the year.

The 2016 and 2023 competitions were streamed live and free on the competition's website and social media channels. At the 2023 competition, the afternoon session of the competition was aired live on 2MBS Fine Music Sydney, and during the finals the previous nights concert were aired the next day on ABC Classic.

In 2021, for the first time since the competition's inception in 1977, patrons were required to pay a subscription fee to watch and listen to the competition. The ABC for the first time did not broadcast the event on free-to-air television. Instead subscriptions which ranged from $20-$30 per session or an overall online subscription of $350 were charged by SIPCA.

=== Prizes ===
The winner of the Sydney International Piano Competition receives a prize of $50,000 and a number of engagements including a national tour of Australia, international recital opportunities and a CD recording. Smaller prizes are awarded for other placings. In the competition's forty-six year history, no Australian pianist has won first prize.

=== Musical patrons ===
The list of musicians and others who have been involved with the competition as either patrons or jurors includes Vladimir Ashkenazy, Lazar Berman, Sir Bernard Heinze, Eileen Joyce, Eugene List, Sir Charles Mackerras, Denis Matthews, Hephzibah Menuhin, John O'Conor, Harold C. Schonberg, Sir Georg Solti and Gordon Watson.

== Criticisms ==
Despite its generally recognised prestige, the competition, particularly under Warren Thomson's chairing, has been strongly criticised by some established Australian pianists. In the lead up to the 2000 edition of the competition, Australian pianists Michael Kieran Harvey, Leslie Howard, Larry Sitsky and Simon Tedeschi argued that the competition had more to bolster the profiles of students of the jury members but had not been able to find a prominent prize-winner unlike other music competitions. Sitsky believed "the facade is a rather shabby private party in progress." Harvey argued that the choice of jurors were not of the level expected for such a premier competition. Critics at the time also pointed to the dominance of the chair, Warren Thomson, who single-handedly chose the repertoire and all the jurors, many of whom are associated with the Australian Institute of Music (AIM), of which he was the Artistic Director for its Professional Development Programs at the time. He was also quite involved with some competitors lives, with him being an official guardian for one competitor in the 2000 competition, Alexei Yemtsov. Tedeschi suggested that the performance preparation comes from a pedagogy promoted by Warren that is not to his tastes, which "makes for poor musicianship, and, ultimately, unhappy lives." Finally, former head of AIM's keyboard department, Margaret Hair, argued that Warren would not promote Australian students through the competition.

Despite Michael Kieran Harvey's criticism, he agreed to become the commentator for the ABC Classic FM's radio broadcast of the 2000 competition, "in an attempt to provide some objective analysis."

== Prize winners and jurors ==
Number	Year	Prize winners	Jurors (incomplete)	Music patron
I	1977	(Soviet Union) Irina Plotnikova	Rex Hobcroft (chairman); Sergei Dorensky; Sir Bernard Heinze; Ludwig Hoffmann; Lucrecia Kasilag; Eugene List; André-François Marescotti; Denis Matthews; Hephzibah Menuhin; Jan Weber; Wiktor Weinbaum	Roger Woodward
I	1977	(Soviet Union) Svetlana Navasardyan	Rex Hobcroft (chairman); Sergei Dorensky; Sir Bernard Heinze; Ludwig Hoffmann; Lucrecia Kasilag; Eugene List; André-François Marescotti; Denis Matthews; Hephzibah Menuhin; Jan Weber; Wiktor Weinbaum	Roger Woodward
I	1977	(Canada) André Laplante	Rex Hobcroft (chairman); Sergei Dorensky; Sir Bernard Heinze; Ludwig Hoffmann; Lucrecia Kasilag; Eugene List; André-François Marescotti; Denis Matthews; Hephzibah Menuhin; Jan Weber; Wiktor Weinbaum	Roger Woodward
I	1977	(United States) Marioara Trifan	Rex Hobcroft (chairman); Sergei Dorensky; Sir Bernard Heinze; Ludwig Hoffmann; Lucrecia Kasilag; Eugene List; André-François Marescotti; Denis Matthews; Hephzibah Menuhin; Jan Weber; Wiktor Weinbaum	Roger Woodward
I	1977	(United Kingdom) Philip Fowke	Rex Hobcroft (chairman); Sergei Dorensky; Sir Bernard Heinze; Ludwig Hoffmann; Lucrecia Kasilag; Eugene List; André-François Marescotti; Denis Matthews; Hephzibah Menuhin; Jan Weber; Wiktor Weinbaum	Roger Woodward
I	1977	(Soviet Union) Manana Doijashvili	Rex Hobcroft (chairman); Sergei Dorensky; Sir Bernard Heinze; Ludwig Hoffmann; Lucrecia Kasilag; Eugene List; André-François Marescotti; Denis Matthews; Hephzibah Menuhin; Jan Weber; Wiktor Weinbaum	Roger Woodward
I	1977	(United States) Daniel Blumenthal	Rex Hobcroft (chairman); Sergei Dorensky; Sir Bernard Heinze; Ludwig Hoffmann; Lucrecia Kasilag; Eugene List; André-François Marescotti; Denis Matthews; Hephzibah Menuhin; Jan Weber; Wiktor Weinbaum	Roger Woodward
I	1977	(Malaysia) Dennis Lee	Rex Hobcroft (chairman); Sergei Dorensky; Sir Bernard Heinze; Ludwig Hoffmann; Lucrecia Kasilag; Eugene List; André-François Marescotti; Denis Matthews; Hephzibah Menuhin; Jan Weber; Wiktor Weinbaum	Roger Woodward
I	1977	(Brazil) Diana Kacso	Rex Hobcroft (chairman); Sergei Dorensky; Sir Bernard Heinze; Ludwig Hoffmann; Lucrecia Kasilag; Eugene List; André-François Marescotti; Denis Matthews; Hephzibah Menuhin; Jan Weber; Wiktor Weinbaum	Roger Woodward
I	1977	(United States) Gary Steigerwalt	Rex Hobcroft (chairman); Sergei Dorensky; Sir Bernard Heinze; Ludwig Hoffmann; Lucrecia Kasilag; Eugene List; André-François Marescotti; Denis Matthews; Hephzibah Menuhin; Jan Weber; Wiktor Weinbaum	Roger Woodward
I	1977	(Hungary) Jenő Jandó	Rex Hobcroft (chairman); Sergei Dorensky; Sir Bernard Heinze; Ludwig Hoffmann; Lucrecia Kasilag; Eugene List; André-François Marescotti; Denis Matthews; Hephzibah Menuhin; Jan Weber; Wiktor Weinbaum	Roger Woodward
I	1977	(Poland) Paweł Chęciński	Rex Hobcroft (chairman); Sergei Dorensky; Sir Bernard Heinze; Ludwig Hoffmann; Lucrecia Kasilag; Eugene List; André-François Marescotti; Denis Matthews; Hephzibah Menuhin; Jan Weber; Wiktor Weinbaum	Roger Woodward
I	1977	(Australia) Piers Lane	Rex Hobcroft (chairman); Sergei Dorensky; Sir Bernard Heinze; Ludwig Hoffmann; Lucrecia Kasilag; Eugene List; André-François Marescotti; Denis Matthews; Hephzibah Menuhin; Jan Weber; Wiktor Weinbaum	Roger Woodward
II	1981	(Canada) Chia Chou	Rex Hobcroft (chairman); Claude Frank; Eileen Joyce; André-François Marescotti; Li Mingqiang; Cécile Ousset; Frederick Page; Abbey Simon; Gordon Watson; Wiktor Weinbaum; Roger Woodward	Sir Bernard Heinze
II	1981	(Hungary) Endre Hegedűs	Rex Hobcroft (chairman); Claude Frank; Eileen Joyce; André-François Marescotti; Li Mingqiang; Cécile Ousset; Frederick Page; Abbey Simon; Gordon Watson; Wiktor Weinbaum; Roger Woodward	Sir Bernard Heinze
II	1981	(Canada) Catherine Vickers	Rex Hobcroft (chairman); Claude Frank; Eileen Joyce; André-François Marescotti; Li Mingqiang; Cécile Ousset; Frederick Page; Abbey Simon; Gordon Watson; Wiktor Weinbaum; Roger Woodward	Sir Bernard Heinze
II	1981	(United States) Daniel Blumenthal	Rex Hobcroft (chairman); Claude Frank; Eileen Joyce; André-François Marescotti; Li Mingqiang; Cécile Ousset; Frederick Page; Abbey Simon; Gordon Watson; Wiktor Weinbaum; Roger Woodward	Sir Bernard Heinze
II	1981	(United Kingdom) David Owen Norris	Rex Hobcroft (chairman); Claude Frank; Eileen Joyce; André-François Marescotti; Li Mingqiang; Cécile Ousset; Frederick Page; Abbey Simon; Gordon Watson; Wiktor Weinbaum; Roger Woodward	Sir Bernard Heinze
II	1981	(Israel) Liora Ziv-Li	Rex Hobcroft (chairman); Claude Frank; Eileen Joyce; André-François Marescotti; Li Mingqiang; Cécile Ousset; Frederick Page; Abbey Simon; Gordon Watson; Wiktor Weinbaum; Roger Woodward	Sir Bernard Heinze
II	1981	(South Africa) Marc Raubenheimer	Rex Hobcroft (chairman); Claude Frank; Eileen Joyce; André-François Marescotti; Li Mingqiang; Cécile Ousset; Frederick Page; Abbey Simon; Gordon Watson; Wiktor Weinbaum; Roger Woodward	Sir Bernard Heinze
II	1981	(New Zealand) Patrick O'Byrne	Rex Hobcroft (chairman); Claude Frank; Eileen Joyce; André-François Marescotti; Li Mingqiang; Cécile Ousset; Frederick Page; Abbey Simon; Gordon Watson; Wiktor Weinbaum; Roger Woodward	Sir Bernard Heinze
II	1981	(United Kingdom) Martin Roscoe	Rex Hobcroft (chairman); Claude Frank; Eileen Joyce; André-François Marescotti; Li Mingqiang; Cécile Ousset; Frederick Page; Abbey Simon; Gordon Watson; Wiktor Weinbaum; Roger Woodward	Sir Bernard Heinze
II	1981	(United States) Alec Chien	Rex Hobcroft (chairman); Claude Frank; Eileen Joyce; André-François Marescotti; Li Mingqiang; Cécile Ousset; Frederick Page; Abbey Simon; Gordon Watson; Wiktor Weinbaum; Roger Woodward	Sir Bernard Heinze
II	1981	(United States) Edward Newman	Rex Hobcroft (chairman); Claude Frank; Eileen Joyce; André-François Marescotti; Li Mingqiang; Cécile Ousset; Frederick Page; Abbey Simon; Gordon Watson; Wiktor Weinbaum; Roger Woodward	Sir Bernard Heinze
II	1981	(France) Yves Rault	Rex Hobcroft (chairman); Claude Frank; Eileen Joyce; André-François Marescotti; Li Mingqiang; Cécile Ousset; Frederick Page; Abbey Simon; Gordon Watson; Wiktor Weinbaum; Roger Woodward	Sir Bernard Heinze
III	1985	(China) Du Ning-Wu	Rex Hobcroft (chairman); Eileen Joyce (deputy chairman); Marcello Abbado; Nicole Henriot; André Laplante; Li Min-duo; Jurgen Meyer-Josten; Elizabeth Powell; Harold C. Schönberg; Peter Solymos; Gordon Watson; Kasulo Yasukawa	Eileen Joyce
III	1985	(West Germany) Bernd Glemser	Rex Hobcroft (chairman); Eileen Joyce (deputy chairman); Marcello Abbado; Nicole Henriot; André Laplante; Li Min-duo; Jurgen Meyer-Josten; Elizabeth Powell; Harold C. Schönberg; Peter Solymos; Gordon Watson; Kasulo Yasukawa	Eileen Joyce
III	1985	(West Germany) Thomas Duis	Rex Hobcroft (chairman); Eileen Joyce (deputy chairman); Marcello Abbado; Nicole Henriot; André Laplante; Li Min-duo; Jurgen Meyer-Josten; Elizabeth Powell; Harold C. Schönberg; Peter Solymos; Gordon Watson; Kasulo Yasukawa	Eileen Joyce
III	1985	(Indonesia) Eduardus Halim	Rex Hobcroft (chairman); Eileen Joyce (deputy chairman); Marcello Abbado; Nicole Henriot; André Laplante; Li Min-duo; Jurgen Meyer-Josten; Elizabeth Powell; Harold C. Schönberg; Peter Solymos; Gordon Watson; Kasulo Yasukawa	Eileen Joyce
III	1985	(Israel) Arnan Weisel	Rex Hobcroft (chairman); Eileen Joyce (deputy chairman); Marcello Abbado; Nicole Henriot; André Laplante; Li Min-duo; Jurgen Meyer-Josten; Elizabeth Powell; Harold C. Schönberg; Peter Solymos; Gordon Watson; Kasulo Yasukawa	Eileen Joyce
III	1985	(Switzerland) Ueli Wiget	Rex Hobcroft (chairman); Eileen Joyce (deputy chairman); Marcello Abbado; Nicole Henriot; André Laplante; Li Min-duo; Jurgen Meyer-Josten; Elizabeth Powell; Harold C. Schönberg; Peter Solymos; Gordon Watson; Kasulo Yasukawa	Eileen Joyce
III	1985	(Hungary) István Gulyás	Rex Hobcroft (chairman); Eileen Joyce (deputy chairman); Marcello Abbado; Nicole Henriot; André Laplante; Li Min-duo; Jurgen Meyer-Josten; Elizabeth Powell; Harold C. Schönberg; Peter Solymos; Gordon Watson; Kasulo Yasukawa	Eileen Joyce
III	1985	(Socialist Federal Republic of Yugoslavia) Rita Kinka	Rex Hobcroft (chairman); Eileen Joyce (deputy chairman); Marcello Abbado; Nicole Henriot; André Laplante; Li Min-duo; Jurgen Meyer-Josten; Elizabeth Powell; Harold C. Schönberg; Peter Solymos; Gordon Watson; Kasulo Yasukawa	Eileen Joyce
III	1985	(Australia) David Selig	Rex Hobcroft (chairman); Eileen Joyce (deputy chairman); Marcello Abbado; Nicole Henriot; André Laplante; Li Min-duo; Jurgen Meyer-Josten; Elizabeth Powell; Harold C. Schönberg; Peter Solymos; Gordon Watson; Kasulo Yasukawa	Eileen Joyce
III	1985	(United States) Michael Gurt	Rex Hobcroft (chairman); Eileen Joyce (deputy chairman); Marcello Abbado; Nicole Henriot; André Laplante; Li Min-duo; Jurgen Meyer-Josten; Elizabeth Powell; Harold C. Schönberg; Peter Solymos; Gordon Watson; Kasulo Yasukawa	Eileen Joyce
III	1985	(Italy) Luigi Ceci	Rex Hobcroft (chairman); Eileen Joyce (deputy chairman); Marcello Abbado; Nicole Henriot; André Laplante; Li Min-duo; Jurgen Meyer-Josten; Elizabeth Powell; Harold C. Schönberg; Peter Solymos; Gordon Watson; Kasulo Yasukawa	Eileen Joyce
III	1985	(Australia) Phillip Shovk	Rex Hobcroft (chairman); Eileen Joyce (deputy chairman); Marcello Abbado; Nicole Henriot; André Laplante; Li Min-duo; Jurgen Meyer-Josten; Elizabeth Powell; Harold C. Schönberg; Peter Solymos; Gordon Watson; Kasulo Yasukawa	Eileen Joyce
IV	1988	(Soviet Union) Alexander Korsantia	Rex Hobcroft (chairman); Joan Chissell; Nicole Henriot; Li Mingqiang; Albrecht Roeseler; Harold C. Schönberg; Warren Thomson; Kazuyuki Tohyama; Ana Maria Trenchi de Botazzi; Arie Vardi; Lev Vlassenko	Eileen Joyce
IV	1988	(Italy) Riccardo Zadra	Rex Hobcroft (chairman); Joan Chissell; Nicole Henriot; Li Mingqiang; Albrecht Roeseler; Harold C. Schönberg; Warren Thomson; Kazuyuki Tohyama; Ana Maria Trenchi de Botazzi; Arie Vardi; Lev Vlassenko	Eileen Joyce
IV	1988	(Indonesia) Eduardus Halim	Rex Hobcroft (chairman); Joan Chissell; Nicole Henriot; Li Mingqiang; Albrecht Roeseler; Harold C. Schönberg; Warren Thomson; Kazuyuki Tohyama; Ana Maria Trenchi de Botazzi; Arie Vardi; Lev Vlassenko	Eileen Joyce
IV	1988	(United States) Sara Davis Buechner	Rex Hobcroft (chairman); Joan Chissell; Nicole Henriot; Li Mingqiang; Albrecht Roeseler; Harold C. Schönberg; Warren Thomson; Kazuyuki Tohyama; Ana Maria Trenchi de Botazzi; Arie Vardi; Lev Vlassenko	Eileen Joyce
IV	1988	(Soviet Union) Sergei Erohin	Rex Hobcroft (chairman); Joan Chissell; Nicole Henriot; Li Mingqiang; Albrecht Roeseler; Harold C. Schönberg; Warren Thomson; Kazuyuki Tohyama; Ana Maria Trenchi de Botazzi; Arie Vardi; Lev Vlassenko	Eileen Joyce
IV	1988	(Australia) Phillip Shovk	Rex Hobcroft (chairman); Joan Chissell; Nicole Henriot; Li Mingqiang; Albrecht Roeseler; Harold C. Schönberg; Warren Thomson; Kazuyuki Tohyama; Ana Maria Trenchi de Botazzi; Arie Vardi; Lev Vlassenko	Eileen Joyce
IV	1988	(Israel) Gilead Mishory	Rex Hobcroft (chairman); Joan Chissell; Nicole Henriot; Li Mingqiang; Albrecht Roeseler; Harold C. Schönberg; Warren Thomson; Kazuyuki Tohyama; Ana Maria Trenchi de Botazzi; Arie Vardi; Lev Vlassenko	Eileen Joyce
IV	1988	(Soviet Union) Anton Batagov	Rex Hobcroft (chairman); Joan Chissell; Nicole Henriot; Li Mingqiang; Albrecht Roeseler; Harold C. Schönberg; Warren Thomson; Kazuyuki Tohyama; Ana Maria Trenchi de Botazzi; Arie Vardi; Lev Vlassenko	Eileen Joyce
IV	1988	(Austria) Matthias Fletzberger	Rex Hobcroft (chairman); Joan Chissell; Nicole Henriot; Li Mingqiang; Albrecht Roeseler; Harold C. Schönberg; Warren Thomson; Kazuyuki Tohyama; Ana Maria Trenchi de Botazzi; Arie Vardi; Lev Vlassenko	Eileen Joyce
IV	1988	(Australia) Victor Sangiorgio	Rex Hobcroft (chairman); Joan Chissell; Nicole Henriot; Li Mingqiang; Albrecht Roeseler; Harold C. Schönberg; Warren Thomson; Kazuyuki Tohyama; Ana Maria Trenchi de Botazzi; Arie Vardi; Lev Vlassenko	Eileen Joyce
IV	1988	(Israel) Asaf Zohar	Rex Hobcroft (chairman); Joan Chissell; Nicole Henriot; Li Mingqiang; Albrecht Roeseler; Harold C. Schönberg; Warren Thomson; Kazuyuki Tohyama; Ana Maria Trenchi de Botazzi; Arie Vardi; Lev Vlassenko	Eileen Joyce
IV	1988	(Hungary) Adrienne Krausz	Rex Hobcroft (chairman); Joan Chissell; Nicole Henriot; Li Mingqiang; Albrecht Roeseler; Harold C. Schönberg; Warren Thomson; Kazuyuki Tohyama; Ana Maria Trenchi de Botazzi; Arie Vardi; Lev Vlassenko	Eileen Joyce
V	1992	(China) Xiang-Dong Kong	Warren Thomson (chairman); Joan Chissell; Anthony Fogg; Edward Gordon; Li Mingqiang; William Littler; Hiroko Nakamura; John O'Conor; Elizabeth Powell; Albrecht Roeseler; Joaquín Soriano; Maurice Till; Arie Vardi; Lev Vlassenko	Sir Charles Mackerras
V	1992	(France) Olivier Cazal	Warren Thomson (chairman); Joan Chissell; Anthony Fogg; Edward Gordon; Li Mingqiang; William Littler; Hiroko Nakamura; John O'Conor; Elizabeth Powell; Albrecht Roeseler; Joaquín Soriano; Maurice Till; Arie Vardi; Lev Vlassenko	Sir Charles Mackerras
V	1992	(Australia) Duncan Gifford	Warren Thomson (chairman); Joan Chissell; Anthony Fogg; Edward Gordon; Li Mingqiang; William Littler; Hiroko Nakamura; John O'Conor; Elizabeth Powell; Albrecht Roeseler; Joaquín Soriano; Maurice Till; Arie Vardi; Lev Vlassenko	Sir Charles Mackerras
V	1992	(Japan) Hiroshi Arimori	Warren Thomson (chairman); Joan Chissell; Anthony Fogg; Edward Gordon; Li Mingqiang; William Littler; Hiroko Nakamura; John O'Conor; Elizabeth Powell; Albrecht Roeseler; Joaquín Soriano; Maurice Till; Arie Vardi; Lev Vlassenko	Sir Charles Mackerras
V	1992	(Russia) Anna Malikova	Warren Thomson (chairman); Joan Chissell; Anthony Fogg; Edward Gordon; Li Mingqiang; William Littler; Hiroko Nakamura; John O'Conor; Elizabeth Powell; Albrecht Roeseler; Joaquín Soriano; Maurice Till; Arie Vardi; Lev Vlassenko	Sir Charles Mackerras
V	1992	(Ukraine) Vitaly Samoshko	Warren Thomson (chairman); Joan Chissell; Anthony Fogg; Edward Gordon; Li Mingqiang; William Littler; Hiroko Nakamura; John O'Conor; Elizabeth Powell; Albrecht Roeseler; Joaquín Soriano; Maurice Till; Arie Vardi; Lev Vlassenko	Sir Charles Mackerras
V	1992	(Israel) Daniel Gortler	Warren Thomson (chairman); Joan Chissell; Anthony Fogg; Edward Gordon; Li Mingqiang; William Littler; Hiroko Nakamura; John O'Conor; Elizabeth Powell; Albrecht Roeseler; Joaquín Soriano; Maurice Till; Arie Vardi; Lev Vlassenko	Sir Charles Mackerras
V	1992	(Germany) Matthias Kirschnereit	Warren Thomson (chairman); Joan Chissell; Anthony Fogg; Edward Gordon; Li Mingqiang; William Littler; Hiroko Nakamura; John O'Conor; Elizabeth Powell; Albrecht Roeseler; Joaquín Soriano; Maurice Till; Arie Vardi; Lev Vlassenko	Sir Charles Mackerras
V	1992	(Italy) Michele Bolla	Warren Thomson (chairman); Joan Chissell; Anthony Fogg; Edward Gordon; Li Mingqiang; William Littler; Hiroko Nakamura; John O'Conor; Elizabeth Powell; Albrecht Roeseler; Joaquín Soriano; Maurice Till; Arie Vardi; Lev Vlassenko	Sir Charles Mackerras
V	1992	(Netherlands) Ivo Janssen	Warren Thomson (chairman); Joan Chissell; Anthony Fogg; Edward Gordon; Li Mingqiang; William Littler; Hiroko Nakamura; John O'Conor; Elizabeth Powell; Albrecht Roeseler; Joaquín Soriano; Maurice Till; Arie Vardi; Lev Vlassenko	Sir Charles Mackerras
V	1992	(South Korea) Young-Ah Kim	Warren Thomson (chairman); Joan Chissell; Anthony Fogg; Edward Gordon; Li Mingqiang; William Littler; Hiroko Nakamura; John O'Conor; Elizabeth Powell; Albrecht Roeseler; Joaquín Soriano; Maurice Till; Arie Vardi; Lev Vlassenko	Sir Charles Mackerras
V	1992	(United States) Helen Sim	Warren Thomson (chairman); Joan Chissell; Anthony Fogg; Edward Gordon; Li Mingqiang; William Littler; Hiroko Nakamura; John O'Conor; Elizabeth Powell; Albrecht Roeseler; Joaquín Soriano; Maurice Till; Arie Vardi; Lev Vlassenko	Sir Charles Mackerras
VI	1996	(Russia) Sergey Tarasov	Warren Thomson (chairman); Aquiles Delle Vigne; Dean Elder; Ernest Fleischmann; Alexander Jenner; György Nador; Hiroko Nakamura; John Painter; John Roos; Pnina Salzman; Edvard Tchivzhel; Mikhail Voskresensky	Sir Georg Solti
VI	1996	(Japan) Yuki Takao	Warren Thomson (chairman); Aquiles Delle Vigne; Dean Elder; Ernest Fleischmann; Alexander Jenner; György Nador; Hiroko Nakamura; John Painter; John Roos; Pnina Salzman; Edvard Tchivzhel; Mikhail Voskresensky	Sir Georg Solti
VI	1996	(Italy) Roberto Cominati	Warren Thomson (chairman); Aquiles Delle Vigne; Dean Elder; Ernest Fleischmann; Alexander Jenner; György Nador; Hiroko Nakamura; John Painter; John Roos; Pnina Salzman; Edvard Tchivzhel; Mikhail Voskresensky	Sir Georg Solti
VI	1996	(Italy) Christiano Burato	Warren Thomson (chairman); Aquiles Delle Vigne; Dean Elder; Ernest Fleischmann; Alexander Jenner; György Nador; Hiroko Nakamura; John Painter; John Roos; Pnina Salzman; Edvard Tchivzhel; Mikhail Voskresensky	Sir Georg Solti
VI	1996	(Russia) (United States) Mikhail Yanovitsky	Warren Thomson (chairman); Aquiles Delle Vigne; Dean Elder; Ernest Fleischmann; Alexander Jenner; György Nador; Hiroko Nakamura; John Painter; John Roos; Pnina Salzman; Edvard Tchivzhel; Mikhail Voskresensky	Sir Georg Solti
VI	1996	(Russia) Dimitry Grigortsevich	Warren Thomson (chairman); Aquiles Delle Vigne; Dean Elder; Ernest Fleischmann; Alexander Jenner; György Nador; Hiroko Nakamura; John Painter; John Roos; Pnina Salzman; Edvard Tchivzhel; Mikhail Voskresensky	Sir Georg Solti
VI	1996	(Russia) Konstantin Masliouk	Warren Thomson (chairman); Aquiles Delle Vigne; Dean Elder; Ernest Fleischmann; Alexander Jenner; György Nador; Hiroko Nakamura; John Painter; John Roos; Pnina Salzman; Edvard Tchivzhel; Mikhail Voskresensky	Sir Georg Solti
VI	1996	(Germany) Ingo Dannhorn	Warren Thomson (chairman); Aquiles Delle Vigne; Dean Elder; Ernest Fleischmann; Alexander Jenner; György Nador; Hiroko Nakamura; John Painter; John Roos; Pnina Salzman; Edvard Tchivzhel; Mikhail Voskresensky	Sir Georg Solti
VI	1996	(Canada) David Louie	Warren Thomson (chairman); Aquiles Delle Vigne; Dean Elder; Ernest Fleischmann; Alexander Jenner; György Nador; Hiroko Nakamura; John Painter; John Roos; Pnina Salzman; Edvard Tchivzhel; Mikhail Voskresensky	Sir Georg Solti
VI	1996	(Australia) Edward Park	Warren Thomson (chairman); Aquiles Delle Vigne; Dean Elder; Ernest Fleischmann; Alexander Jenner; György Nador; Hiroko Nakamura; John Painter; John Roos; Pnina Salzman; Edvard Tchivzhel; Mikhail Voskresensky	Sir Georg Solti
VI	1996	(Hungary) Gábor Rózsa	Warren Thomson (chairman); Aquiles Delle Vigne; Dean Elder; Ernest Fleischmann; Alexander Jenner; György Nador; Hiroko Nakamura; John Painter; John Roos; Pnina Salzman; Edvard Tchivzhel; Mikhail Voskresensky	Sir Georg Solti
VI	1996	(United States) Anne Louise-Turgeon	Warren Thomson (chairman); Aquiles Delle Vigne; Dean Elder; Ernest Fleischmann; Alexander Jenner; György Nador; Hiroko Nakamura; John Painter; John Roos; Pnina Salzman; Edvard Tchivzhel; Mikhail Voskresensky	Sir Georg Solti
VII	2000	(Russia) Marina Kolomiitseva	Warren Thomson (chairman); Lazar Berman; Timothy Calnin; Aquiles Delle Vigne; Franz Muller-Heuser; Irina Plotnikova; Pnina Salzman; Phillip Shovk; Edvard Tchivzhel; Frank Wibaut	Sir Charles Mackerras
VII	2000	(Japan) Ayako Uehara	Warren Thomson (chairman); Lazar Berman; Timothy Calnin; Aquiles Delle Vigne; Franz Muller-Heuser; Irina Plotnikova; Pnina Salzman; Phillip Shovk; Edvard Tchivzhel; Frank Wibaut	Sir Charles Mackerras
VII	2000	(Australia) (Ukraine) Evgeny Ukhanov	Warren Thomson (chairman); Lazar Berman; Timothy Calnin; Aquiles Delle Vigne; Franz Muller-Heuser; Irina Plotnikova; Pnina Salzman; Phillip Shovk; Edvard Tchivzhel; Frank Wibaut	Sir Charles Mackerras
VII	2000	(Russia) Aleksei Volodin	Warren Thomson (chairman); Lazar Berman; Timothy Calnin; Aquiles Delle Vigne; Franz Muller-Heuser; Irina Plotnikova; Pnina Salzman; Phillip Shovk; Edvard Tchivzhel; Frank Wibaut	Sir Charles Mackerras
VII	2000	(Russia) Vera Kamaneva	Warren Thomson (chairman); Lazar Berman; Timothy Calnin; Aquiles Delle Vigne; Franz Muller-Heuser; Irina Plotnikova; Pnina Salzman; Phillip Shovk; Edvard Tchivzhel; Frank Wibaut	Sir Charles Mackerras
VII	2000	(New Zealand) Henry Wong Doe	Warren Thomson (chairman); Lazar Berman; Timothy Calnin; Aquiles Delle Vigne; Franz Muller-Heuser; Irina Plotnikova; Pnina Salzman; Phillip Shovk; Edvard Tchivzhel; Frank Wibaut	Sir Charles Mackerras
VIII	2004	(New Zealand) John Chen	Warren Thomson (chairman); Nancy Bricard; Aquiles Delle Vigne; Alexander Jenner; Xiang-Dong Kong; Piers Lane; William Lyne; John O'Conor; Arie Vardi	Sir Charles Mackerras
VIII	2004	(Russia) Rem Urasin	Warren Thomson (chairman); Nancy Bricard; Aquiles Delle Vigne; Alexander Jenner; Xiang-Dong Kong; Piers Lane; William Lyne; John O'Conor; Arie Vardi	Sir Charles Mackerras
VIII	2004	(Australia) Daniel de Borah	Warren Thomson (chairman); Nancy Bricard; Aquiles Delle Vigne; Alexander Jenner; Xiang-Dong Kong; Piers Lane; William Lyne; John O'Conor; Arie Vardi	Sir Charles Mackerras
VIII	2004	(Japan) Ayano Shimada	Warren Thomson (chairman); Nancy Bricard; Aquiles Delle Vigne; Alexander Jenner; Xiang-Dong Kong; Piers Lane; William Lyne; John O'Conor; Arie Vardi	Sir Charles Mackerras
VIII	2004	(Russia) Alexander Lubyantsev	Warren Thomson (chairman); Nancy Bricard; Aquiles Delle Vigne; Alexander Jenner; Xiang-Dong Kong; Piers Lane; William Lyne; John O'Conor; Arie Vardi	Sir Charles Mackerras
VIII	2004	(China) Chu-Fang Huang	Warren Thomson (chairman); Nancy Bricard; Aquiles Delle Vigne; Alexander Jenner; Xiang-Dong Kong; Piers Lane; William Lyne; John O'Conor; Arie Vardi	Sir Charles Mackerras
IX	2008	(Russia) Konstantin Shamray	Warren Thomson (chairman); Michael Brimer; Aquiles Delle Vigne; Manana Doijashvili; Norma Fisher; Choong-Mo Kang; Heinz Medjimorec; Ian Munro; Phillip Shovk; Arie Vardi	Vladimir Ashkenazy
IX	2008	(Russia) Tatiana Kolesova	Warren Thomson (chairman); Michael Brimer; Aquiles Delle Vigne; Manana Doijashvili; Norma Fisher; Choong-Mo Kang; Heinz Medjimorec; Ian Munro; Phillip Shovk; Arie Vardi	Vladimir Ashkenazy
IX	2008	(Israel) Ran Dank	Warren Thomson (chairman); Michael Brimer; Aquiles Delle Vigne; Manana Doijashvili; Norma Fisher; Choong-Mo Kang; Heinz Medjimorec; Ian Munro; Phillip Shovk; Arie Vardi	Vladimir Ashkenazy
IX	2008	(Japan) Takashi Sato	Warren Thomson (chairman); Michael Brimer; Aquiles Delle Vigne; Manana Doijashvili; Norma Fisher; Choong-Mo Kang; Heinz Medjimorec; Ian Munro; Phillip Shovk; Arie Vardi	Vladimir Ashkenazy
IX	2008	(Japan) Tomoki Kitamura	Warren Thomson (chairman); Michael Brimer; Aquiles Delle Vigne; Manana Doijashvili; Norma Fisher; Choong-Mo Kang; Heinz Medjimorec; Ian Munro; Phillip Shovk; Arie Vardi	Vladimir Ashkenazy
IX	2008	(United States) Eric Zuber	Warren Thomson (chairman); Michael Brimer; Aquiles Delle Vigne; Manana Doijashvili; Norma Fisher; Choong-Mo Kang; Heinz Medjimorec; Ian Munro; Phillip Shovk; Arie Vardi	Vladimir Ashkenazy
X	2012	(Canada) Avan Yu	Warren Thomson (Chairman); Michael Brimer; Aquiles Delle Vigne; Manana Doijashvili; Norma Fisher; Heinz Medjimorec; Ian Munro; Phillip Shovk; Arie Vardi; Dan-Wei Wei	Vladimir Ashkenazy
X	2012	(Russia) Nikolay Khozyainov	Warren Thomson (Chairman); Michael Brimer; Aquiles Delle Vigne; Manana Doijashvili; Norma Fisher; Heinz Medjimorec; Ian Munro; Phillip Shovk; Arie Vardi; Dan-Wei Wei	Vladimir Ashkenazy
X	2012	(Ukraine) Dmitry Onishchenko	Warren Thomson (Chairman); Michael Brimer; Aquiles Delle Vigne; Manana Doijashvili; Norma Fisher; Heinz Medjimorec; Ian Munro; Phillip Shovk; Arie Vardi; Dan-Wei Wei	Vladimir Ashkenazy
X	2012	(Russia) Mikhail Berestnev	Warren Thomson (Chairman); Michael Brimer; Aquiles Delle Vigne; Manana Doijashvili; Norma Fisher; Heinz Medjimorec; Ian Munro; Phillip Shovk; Arie Vardi; Dan-Wei Wei	Vladimir Ashkenazy
X	2012	(China) Hao Zhu	Warren Thomson (Chairman); Michael Brimer; Aquiles Delle Vigne; Manana Doijashvili; Norma Fisher; Heinz Medjimorec; Ian Munro; Phillip Shovk; Arie Vardi; Dan-Wei Wei	Vladimir Ashkenazy
X	2012	(United States) Tanya Gabrielian	Warren Thomson (Chairman); Michael Brimer; Aquiles Delle Vigne; Manana Doijashvili; Norma Fisher; Heinz Medjimorec; Ian Munro; Phillip Shovk; Arie Vardi; Dan-Wei Wei	Vladimir Ashkenazy
XI	2016	(Russia) Andrey Gugnin	Piers Lane (Chairman); Sa Chen; Nikolai Demidenko; Ewa Kupiec; Hamish Milne; Noriko Ogawa; Orli Shaham; Carl Vine; Timothy Walker; Mira Yevtich	Valery Gergiev
XI	2016	(Russia) Arseny Tarasevich-Nikolaev	Piers Lane (Chairman); Sa Chen; Nikolai Demidenko; Ewa Kupiec; Hamish Milne; Noriko Ogawa; Orli Shaham; Carl Vine; Timothy Walker; Mira Yevtich	Valery Gergiev
XI	2016	(China) Moye Chen	Piers Lane (Chairman); Sa Chen; Nikolai Demidenko; Ewa Kupiec; Hamish Milne; Noriko Ogawa; Orli Shaham; Carl Vine; Timothy Walker; Mira Yevtich	Valery Gergiev
XI	2016	(United States) Kenneth Broberg	Piers Lane (Chairman); Sa Chen; Nikolai Demidenko; Ewa Kupiec; Hamish Milne; Noriko Ogawa; Orli Shaham; Carl Vine; Timothy Walker; Mira Yevtich	Valery Gergiev
XI	2016	(Kazakhstan) Oxana Shevchenko	Piers Lane (Chairman); Sa Chen; Nikolai Demidenko; Ewa Kupiec; Hamish Milne; Noriko Ogawa; Orli Shaham; Carl Vine; Timothy Walker; Mira Yevtich	Valery Gergiev
XI	2016	(China) Jianing Kong	Piers Lane (Chairman); Sa Chen; Nikolai Demidenko; Ewa Kupiec; Hamish Milne; Noriko Ogawa; Orli Shaham; Carl Vine; Timothy Walker; Mira Yevtich	Valery Gergiev
XII	2021	(Italy) (Slovenia) Alexander Gadjiev	Piers Lane (Chairman); Olivier Cazal; Mark Coughlan; Đặng Thái Sơn; Olga Kern; Vladimir Tropp; Seta Tanyel; Mira Yevtich	Valery Gergiev
XII	2021	(Ukraine) Artem Yasynskyy	Piers Lane (Chairman); Olivier Cazal; Mark Coughlan; Đặng Thái Sơn; Olga Kern; Vladimir Tropp; Seta Tanyel; Mira Yevtich	Valery Gergiev
XII	2021	(Australia) (Indonesia) Calvin Abdiel	Piers Lane (Chairman); Olivier Cazal; Mark Coughlan; Đặng Thái Sơn; Olga Kern; Vladimir Tropp; Seta Tanyel; Mira Yevtich	Valery Gergiev
XII	2021	(Canada) Alice Burla	Piers Lane (Chairman); Olivier Cazal; Mark Coughlan; Đặng Thái Sơn; Olga Kern; Vladimir Tropp; Seta Tanyel; Mira Yevtich	Valery Gergiev
XII	2021	(Hungary) Ádám Balogh	Piers Lane (Chairman); Olivier Cazal; Mark Coughlan; Đặng Thái Sơn; Olga Kern; Vladimir Tropp; Seta Tanyel; Mira Yevtich	Valery Gergiev
XII	2021	(Japan) Shion Ota	Piers Lane (Chairman); Olivier Cazal; Mark Coughlan; Đặng Thái Sơn; Olga Kern; Vladimir Tropp; Seta Tanyel; Mira Yevtich	Valery Gergiev
XIII	2023	(South Korea) Jeonghwan Kim	Piers Lane (Chairman); Tanya Bannister; Alexander Gavrylyuk; Konstantin Shamray; Kathryn Stott; Alasdair Tait; Xiaohan Wang; Uta Weyand	Zubin Mehta
XIII	2023	(Belarus) Uladzislau Khandohi	Piers Lane (Chairman); Tanya Bannister; Alexander Gavrylyuk; Konstantin Shamray; Kathryn Stott; Alasdair Tait; Xiaohan Wang; Uta Weyand	Zubin Mehta
XIII	2023	(China) Yungyung Guo	Piers Lane (Chairman); Tanya Bannister; Alexander Gavrylyuk; Konstantin Shamray; Kathryn Stott; Alasdair Tait; Xiaohan Wang; Uta Weyand	Zubin Mehta
XIII	2023	(United Kingdom) Yuanfan Yang	Piers Lane (Chairman); Tanya Bannister; Alexander Gavrylyuk; Konstantin Shamray; Kathryn Stott; Alasdair Tait; Xiaohan Wang; Uta Weyand	Zubin Mehta
XIII	2023	(China) Wynona Yinuo Wang	Piers Lane (Chairman); Tanya Bannister; Alexander Gavrylyuk; Konstantin Shamray; Kathryn Stott; Alasdair Tait; Xiaohan Wang; Uta Weyand	Zubin Mehta
XIII	2023	(Russia) Vitaly Starikov	Piers Lane (Chairman); Tanya Bannister; Alexander Gavrylyuk; Konstantin Shamray; Kathryn Stott; Alasdair Tait; Xiaohan Wang; Uta Weyand	Zubin Mehta

== 2016 Competition ==
The 11th Sydney International Piano Competition took place from 6 to 23 July 2016. The preliminary rounds and semi final sounds were held in the Verbrugghen Hall at the Sydney Conservatorium of Music. The finals were held at the Sydney Opera House.

=== 2016 Prize Winners ===
1st Prize	Andrey Gugnin	(Russia)
2nd Prize	Arseny Tarasevich-Nikolaev	(Russia)
3rd Prize	Moye Chen	(China)
4th Prize	Kenneth Broberg	(United States)
5th Prize	Oxana Shevchenko	(Kazakhstan)
6th Prize	Jianing Kong	(China)

=== 2016 Jury Members ===
Sa Chen	(China)
Nikolai Demidenko	(Russia) (United Kingdom) (Spain)
Ewa Kupiec	(Poland) (Germany)
Hamish Milne	(United Kingdom)
Noriko Ogawa	(Japan) (United Kingdom)
Orli Shaham	(United States)
Carl Vine AO	(Australia)
Timothy Walker AM	(Australia) (United Kingdom)
Mira Yevtich	(Serbia) (Italy)

=== 2016 Special Prizewinners ===
Prizewinner	Details
(Russia) Andrey Gugnin	Best Overall Concerto sponsored and selected by the Sydney Symphony Orchestra
(China) Jianing Kong	Best 18th Century Concerto donated by Drs Keith and Eileen Ong
(Russia) Andrey Gugnin	Best 19th or 20th Century Concerto donated by Janice Tuynman in memory of her husband Hank Tuynman
(Russia) Andrey Gugnin	Best Violin and Piano Sonata donated by Susie Bate and Annie Moulden in memory of their uncle, Warren Thomson OAM
(Kazakhstan) Oxana Shevchenko	Best Piano Quintet donated by David and Jan Robinson
(Russia) Andrey Gugnin	Best Preliminaries Round 1 Recital donated by Ron, Lynn and Marcus Ogden
(Russia) Arseny Tarasevich-Nikolaev	Best Preliminaries Round 2 Recital donated by Dr Robert Mitchell in memory of Denis Condon
(China) Jianing Kong	Best Semi Finals Recital donated by Dr Robert Mitchell in memory of Denis Condon
(Hungary) Daniel Lebhardt	Most Promising Pianist Sponsored by Universal Music Australia
(Australia) Tony Lee	Best Australian Pianist donated by Youth Music Foundation
(South Korea) Gyu Tae Ha	Best Performance of an Australian Piece donated by Hugh Hallard and Judy Hunt in memory of Warren Thomson OAM
(Russia) Sergey Belyavskiy	Chairman of the Board’s Prize for the Best Performance of a work by Liszt donated by Neville Grace
(China) Ming Xie	People’s Choice sponsored by Yamaha
(China) Ming Xie	Medal for the Most Promising Competitor donated by Graham Wickes in memory of Australian pianist Dennis Hennig
(Sweden) Martin Malmgren	Jury Discretionary Award donated by the 2016 Jury members

== See also ==
- List of classical music competitions
