= Arseny Tarasevich-Nikolaev =

Russian concert pianist (born 1993)

Arseny Tarasevich-Nikolaev Russian: Арсений Тарасевич-Николаев
- Born: Arseny Tarasevich-Nikolaev; 21 February 1993 (age 32); Moscow, Russia
- Occupation: Pianist
- Years active: (2000 – present)
- Website: arsenytarasevichnikolaev.com

Arseny Tarasevich-Nikolaev (Russian: Арсений Тарасевич-Николаев; born 21 February 1993) is a Russian concert pianist, born in Moscow. Tarasevich-Nikolaev's grandmother was Tatiana Nikolaeva. He began piano studies at age four. His public debut was at age nine, with the Bryansk City Chamber Orchestra. From 2000 to 2011, he studied at the Central School of Music of the Moscow State Tchaikovsky Conservatoire, where his teachers included Alexander Mndoyants. In 2011, he entered the Moscow Conservatory, and continued his piano studies with Nikolai Lugansky, Sergey Dorensky, Andrey Pisarev and Pavel Nersessian.

== Prizes and awards ==
Tarasevich-Nikolaev has received several piano competition prizes. These include:

- 1st Prize, 'Le Muse' Piano Competition in Italy (2003)
- Grand Prix, International Piano Competition in Kaliningrad (2005)
- 1st Prize, Rovere d’Oro Prize International Instrumental and Vocal Competition (2008)
- 1st Prize, 'New Names' Competition in Moscow (2008)
- 1st Prize, 5th Scriabin Piano Competition (2012)

In 2013, Tarasevich-Nikolaev won 2nd prize, and a special prize, at the Cleveland International Piano Competition. In 2014, he took 2nd prize at the International Edvard Grieg Piano Competition in Bergen.

In 2015, Tarasevich-Nikolaev recorded his debut disc, featuring works by Debussy and Ravel, for the Acousence label. In 2016, he won 2nd prize at the Sydney International Piano Competition. His performance at the Sydney competition led to a joint recording contract arrangement with Tarasevich-Nikolaev by Decca Classics and Universal Music Australia.
