= Julia Sigova =

Belarusian-Swedish pianist

- Born: September 11, 1982 (age 43); Minsk, Belarus
- Education: Minsk State Musical College; Malmö Academy of Music; Sibelius Academy
- Occupation: pianist
- Website: juliasigova.com

Julia Sigova (born 1982) is a Belarusian-Swedish classical concert pianist.

Born in Minsk, Julia started to play the piano at the age of 6. After finishing at Glinka Music High School in Minsk, she was invited to study at the Malmö Academy of Music (part of the Lund University) where she also did her soloist diploma for Prof. Hans Pålsson. Julia has also studied at the Sibelius Academy in Helsinki. She continued her education as a soloist under the guidance of Konstantin Bogino in Bergamo and Norma Fisher in London.

In 2008 she was awarded a scholarship as the Best Female pianist in the Öresund Region and in 2011 she was chosen as the Best Female Artist in Sweden by Fredrika Bremer Association.

Since Julia's debut with The Malmö Symphony Orchestra in 2010, she has performed at "La Biennale" in Venice, Båstad Chamber Music Festival and St Martin-in-the-Fields among others.

She has performed with well known soloists and conductors such as Håkan Hardenberger, Mats Rondin, Marc Soustrot, Matthew Rowe and others.
