= Ayako Uehara =

Ayako Uehara is a Japanese name and may refer to:

- Ayako Uehara (golfer) (born 1983), Japanese golfer
- Ayako Uehara (pianist) (born 1980), Japanese pianist
