= Olga Jegunova =

Latvian classical pianist (born 1984)

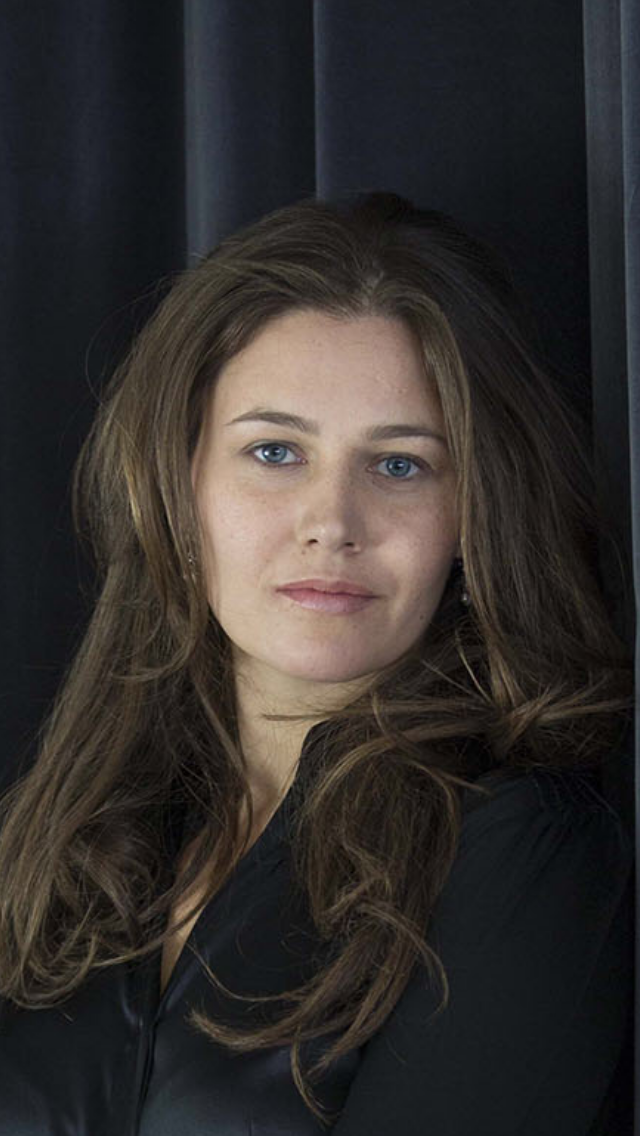

Background information
- Born: Šiauliai, Lithuania
- Genres: Classical
- Occupation: pianist
- Instrument: Piano
- Website: www.olga-jegunova.com

Olga Jegunova (born 25 May 1984) is a Latvian classical pianist, born in Šiauliai, Lithuania (then Lithuanian Soviet Socialist Republic). She is now married, mother of two children and lives in Paris.

== Career ==
After studying music at Jāzeps Vītols Latvian Academy of Music, concluding with a bachelor's degree, she obtained her master's degree at the Hochschule für Musik und Theater Hamburg. This was followed by studying at the Royal College of Music (Artist Diploma course as an RCM scholar under Dmitri Alexeev) and then at the Royal Northern College of Music where her piano teacher was Norma Fisher. In 2013 she studied at the Samling Academy in the UK.

Jegunova has taken part in numerous master classes with eminent pianists such as András Schiff at the Prussian Cove International Musicians Seminar, an annual event, Ferenc Rados, Eliso Virsaladze, Mikhail Voskresensky, Benjamin Zander and Lazar Berman. As a soloist she has worked with conductors such as Saulius Sondeckis, Alexander Soddy, Andres Mustonen and Muhai Tang and appeared with ensembles and orchestras such as the Sinfonia Concertante, founded by musicians of the Deutsche Kammerphilharmonie Bremen, the Lithuanian Chamber Orchestra, the Zurich Chamber Orchestra, the Pasdeloup Orchestra and the Manchester Camerata.

In 2013, Jegunova gave a recital at the Edinburgh International Festival which was met with enthusiastic critical acclaim, played the same year in the "Noureev & Friends" concert performance in the Palais des congrès in Paris, and in 2015 for the Latvian EU Presidency's annual Burns supper in Brussels.

In 2014 she played before Princess Beatrix of the Netherlands, in 2015 at the Latvian Day Celebration Concert in the Westminster Cathedral Hall in the presence of the Latvian ambassador, Andris Teikmanis, and was chosen to take part in the Baltic Stars Ensemble, a concert organised by the City Music Society of London in the St Lawrence Jewry Church.

In December 2015, Jegunova and Glyn Eggar founded a charity originally named OlgaRhythm, later renamed the Open Music Foundation. The organisation aimed to support music students of all ages and abilities by providing access to lessons, instruments, and other educational resources. During the COVID-19 pandemic, it also offered financial assistance to professional musicians facing hardship due to reduced performance opportunities.

The charity operated until its closure in 2023, which coincided with Jegunova’s relocation to France. Following its dissolution, many of its former students began receiving support from the charity Future Talent.

In 2024, Jegunova premiered Raphaël Lucas’ Piano Concerto at the Opéra de Toulon.

That same year, she founded the Festival Les Nocturnes à Solliès-Pont, held at Château Forbin. The first two editions featured guest artists including actor Charles Berling, pianist Petr Limonov, and jazz musicians Leslie Lewis and Philippe Duchemin. The festival also includes children’s concerts in the form of musical tales.

Jegunova is also the program director for family concerts at the Festival Les Nuits du Château de la Moutte, where she develops programming aimed at making classical music accessible to younger audiences.

== Collaborations ==
Jegunova has worked with Alina García-Lapuerta and re-created, with the soprano Kirstin Sharpin, the "Lost Song" originally sung by Maria de las Mercedes Santa Cruz y Montalvo. She has also worked with the story teller Jan Blake on the Peter and the Wolf performance for children.

Jegunova was invited to work as a presenter at the 2015 International Tchaikovsky Competition in Moscow, where she interviewed Vadim Repin, violinist and member of the jury, and Maxim Vengerov. She also broadcast live interviews with other well-known musicians at this competition.

Since 2009, Jegunova has worked as a performer for Live Music Now, a charity providing live music in the concert hall as well as in the welfare, educational, justice and health sectors. She teaches piano to students of Queen Mary University of London.

In 2017, Jegunova collaborated with composer Artūrs Kalniņš on his piano suite Reflections on Baltic Light, a work commissioned for the centenary of Latvia's independence.

At Festival Les Nocturnes à Solliès-Pont, Jegunova has collaborated with actors such as Charles Berling and Bérengère Warluzel. Furthermore she has collaborated with Matthew Crampton, Jane Blake, Nicolas Vaude, Nicolas Dufetel and Benoît Turjman.

== Awards ==
Jegunova won the Concours Musical de France Ginette Gaubert in Paris and in 2008 the Steinway-Förderpreis in Hamburg. In 2016 she was accepted by Steinway & Sons as a Steinway Artist. She has been a prize-winner at the Concours International de Piano Maryse Cheilan in France, at the Stasys Vainiūnas competition in Vilnius and at the competition of the foundation Animato in Zurich, and was a semi-finalist at the prestigious Concours Géza Anda in Zurich.
