= Daniel Blumenthal (pianist) =

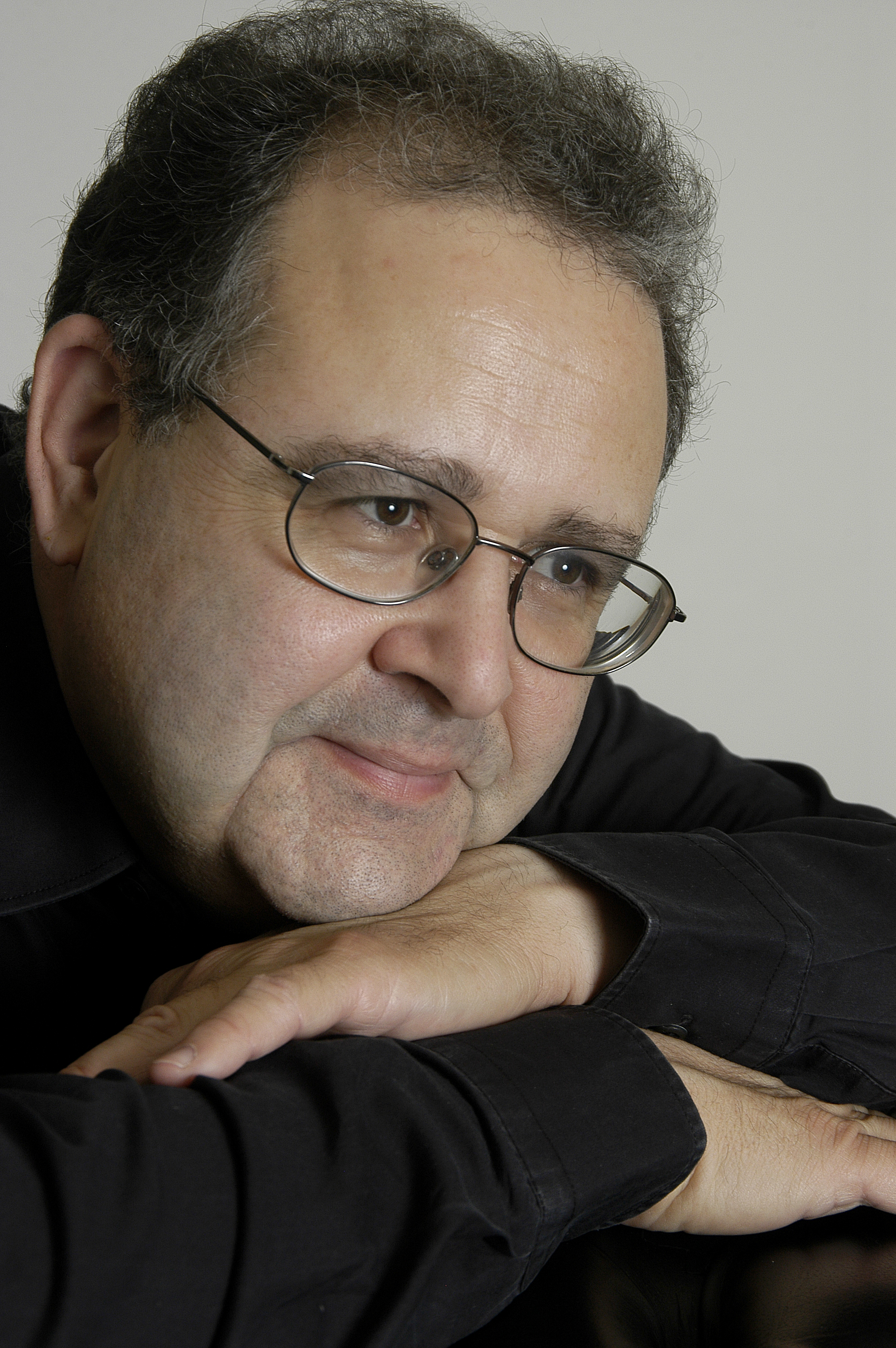

Background information
- Born: September 23, 1952 (age 73); Landstuhl, Germany
- Genres: classical
- Instrument: piano
- Awards: Queen Elisabeth Competition laureate (1983)

Daniel Blumenthal (born September 23, 1952) is a German-born American pianist.

Daniel Blumenthal is professor at the Royal Conservatory of Music in Brussels, and of the Thy Masterclass Chamber Music Festival in Denmark. He has served on the jury of the Queen Elisabeth Competition for Piano and the Paris Conservatory. He is an honorary member and musical advisor of Icons of Europe, Brussels.

Daniel Blumenthal was born to Rivkah Blumenthal (Nee Goldin, born Gomel, Belarus 1923) and Col. Peter J. Blumenthal, U.S. Army (born Berlin 1921) in Landstuhl, Germany, on September 23, 1952. He began his musical studies in Paris at 5 years of age, graduated from the University of Michigan with a Bachelor of Music in Piano Performance, and earned both a Master of Music and Doctor of Musical Arts degree from the Juilliard School in New York City. After Julliard he went to London to study piano with Benjamin Kaplan.

== Career ==
Blumenthal has performed with leading European orchestras. In addition to his concerto performances, he has performed numerous recitals in Amsterdam’s Concertgebouw, the Théâtre des Champs-Elysées, and the Teatro della Pergola in Florence. He has performed in all of the major concert halls in London, including three acclaimed recitals at the Queen Elizabeth Hall.

U.S. concerto performances have included appearances with the Atlanta, Dallas, Maryland, and Utah Symphonies, as well as a televised performance as soloist with the Houston Symphony. His North American recital venues include Tanglewood, Yale University, and the Frick Collection and Carnegie Hall and Lincoln Center in New York. Blumenthal has performed in South America, Australia and Southeast Asia.

== Awards ==
Blumenthal has won prizes in several competitions, including the Sydney International Piano Competition, (1981, 4th prize and winner of the Musica Viva Chamber Music prize); the Leeds International Piano Competition, (1981, 4th prize); the Geneva International Music Competition, (1982, 2nd prize); the Busoni Competition (1982, 3rd prize), and the Queen Elisabeth Music Competition, (1983, 4th prize).

== Discography ==
With a discography of more than eighty solo and chamber music releases, Blumenthal can be heard on EMI, Calliope, Autographe, Naïve, Cyprés, Ambroisie, ADDA, Reader’s Digest, Cybelia, Phonic, Marco Polo, Naxos, Etectera, Musique en Wallonie, and Fuga Libera.
