= Claire Dan =

Hungarian-Australian actress and philanthropist

Claire Dan AM OBE (1916. november 29. – 22 October 2012) was a Hungarian-Australian actress and philanthropist, best known for founding the Sydney International Piano Competition in 1977.

== Biography ==
Clara Dan was born in Hungary in 1916. She was an actress and cabaret performer, appearing at the National and Vig (Comedy) Theatres in Budapest, both before and after World War II. Her first husband of only six months was sent to a Soviet labour camp and she never saw him again. While on a one-woman tour of Romania in 1947 she met another Hungarian, Peter Abeles, then a cabaret entrepreneur, and they married. They left Hungary for a better life, and lived in Rome, London and Paris before migrating to Australia in 1949. She was naturalised an Australian citizen in November 1954.

She and Peter Abeles adopted two daughters. After her divorce from Abeles, in 1976 she set up the Cladan Cultural Institute of Australia, a private philanthropic body that acts as the funding body for the Sydney International Piano Competition of Australia (SIPCA). She founded the competition in association with Rex Hobcroft, the then Director of the Sydney Conservatorium of Music, and with support from the New South Wales Government, then headed by Premier Neville Wran. SIPCA was first held in 1977 and soon became one of the world's most prestigious classical piano competitions. SIPCA was managed from Claire Dan's home, "Sundorne", 23 Victoria Rd, Bellevue Hill, Sydney.

In 2008 she published an autobiography titled Ups and Downs.

Claire Dan was appointed an Officer of the Order of the British Empire (OBE), and in 1986 a Member of the Order of Australia (AM), in recognition of her service to the performing arts.

She died on 22 October 2012, aged 95. "Sundorne" was sold for $15.5 million in May 2013, the buyer being the neighbouring Cranbrook School, which had once owned the land.
