= Catherine Vickers =

Canadian pianist

Catherine Vickers (born 1952 in Regina) is a Canadian pianist.

Vickers studied in Edmonton and then in Germany with Bernhard Ebert and Hans Leygraf at Hochschule für Musik und Theater Hannover. She won the 1979 Ferruccio Busoni International Piano Competition and was awarded the 1981 Sydney Competition's 3rd prize.

As a classical pianist she performed in Europe, North and South America and Asia, her repertoire includes standard and avantgardistic works of the piano literature. Vickers subsequently settled in Germany, where she was a professor at the Folkwang University of the Arts and then at the Frankfurt University of Music and Performing Arts from 1998 to 2018. She also was the artistic director of an electronics-piano festival (Piano+) at Karlsruhe's Center for Art and Media Karlsruhe (Zentrum für Kunst und Medientechnologie). She is known for her work at the contemporary music scene.
