= Olivier Cazal =

French pianist (born 1962)

Olivier Cazal (born 1962 in Toulouse) is a French pianist.

He was awarded 2nd prizes at the 1988 Maria Canals Competition, the 1991 Concorso Busoni (ex-aequo with Igor Kamenz), the 1991 Long-Thibaud Competition, and the 1992 Sydney International Piano Competition. He won 1st prize at the 1993 Premio de Jaén.

Cazal is internationally active as a concert pianist, and has recorded Francis Poulenc's complete piano works for Naxos Records.
