= Irina Plotnikova =

Russian pianist

Irina Plotnikova is a Russian pianist.

Irina Plotnikova won the inaugural Sydney International Piano Competition (1977), and presented the Opening Recital at the 1985 and 2000 competitions.

She is now a professor at the Tchaikovsky Conservatory.
