= Alexander Reinagle =

American composer (1756–1809)

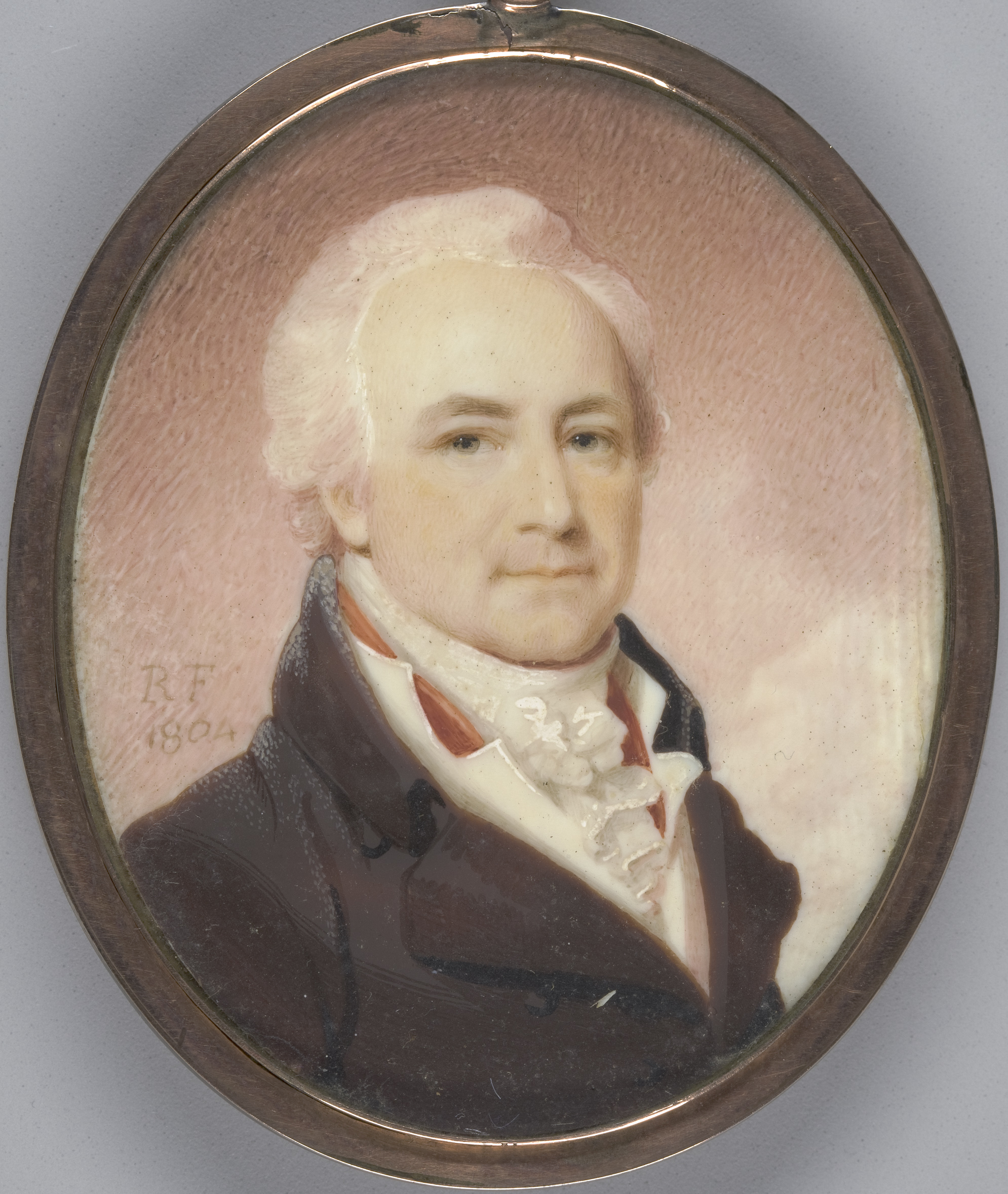
- Born: 23 April 1756; Portsmouth, England
- Died: 21 September 1809 (aged 53); Baltimore, Maryland, U.S.
- Occupations: Organist, theater musician, music teacher
- Era: Classical

Alexander Robert Reinagle (23 April 1756 – 21 September 1809) was an English-born American composer, organist, and theater musician. He should not be confused with his nephew of the same name, Alexander Robert Reinagle (21 August 1799 – 6 April 1877), also a composer and organist, who lived all his life in Britain. He was close friends with a young Mozart when he visited London. He was influenced by Haydn, Mozart and Clementi.

== Scotland ==
Reinagle was born in Portsmouth, England. His father was a Hungarian professional musician and his mother was Scots. His brothers Joseph Reinagle and Hugh Reinagle were also musicians. He studied music with his father, then with Raynor Taylor in Edinburgh. He went on a trip to London in 1763. He met Mozart and his family a year later.

At first, Reinagle made a living in the shipping industry, making several trips to the American colonies during the 1770s. In Edinburgh, he taught music and presented several concerts. His first keyboard compositions were published in Glasgow and became popular in the American colonies.

== New York and Philadelphia ==
Shortly after performing with his brother Hugh before the Portuguese royal family in Lisbon in 1785, in 1786, Reinagle decided to try his fortune as a professional musician in the newly independent United States of America. He moved to New York City, and, later moved again to Philadelphia, which was the national capital at the time. He helped revitalize the musical life of Philadelphia in the 1790s, introducing that city to the music of Haydn and Mozart, as well as his own original compositions.

One of Reinagle's admirers was American President George Washington. In 1789, Reinagle composed a "Chorus", which was performed for Washington at Trenton, New Jersey, during Washington's journey to his inauguration. Later, in Philadelphia, Nellie Custis, Washington's step-granddaughter, was one of Reinagle's music students. Washington was a frequent concertgoer, and could often be seen in the audience at Reinagle's concerts. On Washington's death in 1799, Reinagle composed a Monody on the Death of George Washington.

In Philadelphia, Reinagle worked closely with Thomas Wignell in producing opera ballets with the New Company, at the Chestnut Street Theater. Reinagle and Wignell produced over 75 programs with the New Company. At Wignell's death in 1803, Reinagle moved to Baltimore, Maryland, where he became associated with the Holliday Street Theater. He died in Baltimore in 1809, and is buried in Old Saint Paul's Cemetery there.

== Reinagle's music ==
His earliest compositions, from his days in Edinburgh, include a set of duos for two cellos, Opus 2, and Variations on Famous Scots Tunes, published in Glasgow and later in Philadelphia. He also composed Twenty-four Short and Easy Lessons, a series of teaching pieces for keyboard, which he later used in his teaching in Philadelphia.

Once in America, Reinagle continued to compose short pieces for special occasions, often with titles alluding to American personalities and ideas. Pieces such as his Federal March, President Madison’s March and Mrs. Madison’s Minuet are usually short and in the binary form associated with dance music of the time. Of more interest is the set of four keyboard sonatas. Reinagle composed these when he first arrived in Philadelphia; hence they are sometimes called the "Philadelphia Sonatas". These are the first sonatas composed in the United States. They are substantial works, each in two or three movements. While they show the influence of C. P. E. Bach (one of Reinagle's idols), they demonstrate Reinagle's unique approach to form and motivic development.

Much of Reinagle's theater music was lost when the Chestnut Street Theater burned down in 1820.

== Selected stage works ==
- Robin Hood, or Sherwood Forest (10.3.1794 Philadelphia) [rev. (W. Shield)]
- St Patrick's Day, or The Scheming Lieutenant (17.3.1794 Philadelphia)
- La forêt noire (26.4.1794 Philadelphia)
- The Spanish Barber, or The Fruitless Precaution (7.7.1794 Philadelphia) [+ B. Carr] [rev. (S. Arnold)]
- Harlequin Shipwreck'd, or The Grateful Lion (2.1.1795 Philadelphia)
- The Purse, or Benevolent Tar (7.1.1795 Philadelphia) [rev. (Arnold)]
- The Volunteers (21.1.1795 Philadelphia)
- Auld Robin Gray, or Jamie's Return from America (4.5.1795 Philadelphia) [rev. (Arnold)]
- The Sicilian Romance, or The Apparition of the Cliffs (6.5.1795 Philadelphia)
- Harlequin's Invasion (12.6.1795 Philadelphia)
- The Warrior's Welcome Home (10.2.1796 Philadelphia)
- The Witches of the Rocks, or Harlequin Everywhere (26.2.1796 Philadelphia)
- The Lucky Escape, or The Ploughman Turned Sailor (14.3.1796 Philadelphia) [rev. (C. Dibdin)]
- Columbus, or The Discovery of America (30.1.1797 Philadelphia)
- The Savoyard, or The Repentant Seducer (12.7.1797 Philadelphia)
- The Italian Monk (11.4.1798 Philadelphia) [rev. (Arnold)?]
- The Arabs of the Desert, or Harlequin's Flight from Egypt (13.4.1799 Philadelphia)
- The Constellation, or A Wreath for American Tars (30.12.1799 Philadelphia)
- A Wreath for American Tars, or Huzza Again for the Constitution (8.4.1800 Philadelphia)
- The Double Disguise (18.4.1800 Philadelphia)
- Harlequin Freemason (21.4.1800 Philadelphia) [rev. (Dibdin)]
- The Sailor's Daughter (10.12.1804 Philadelphia)
- The Wife of Two Husbands (1.3.1805 Philadelphia)
- Mary, Queen of Scots (15.1.1806 Philadelphia)
- The Travellers, or Music's Fascination (20.4.1807 Philadelphia) [rev. (D. Corri)?]

== Selected discography ==
- Reinagle, Alexander. Three Keyboard Sonatas. (Jack Winerock, pf.) Musical Heritage Society, MHS 3359. Played on the Metropolitan Museum of Art's Broadwood piano.
