= Sascha Gorodnitzki =

American pianist (1904–1986)

- Born: 24 May 1904; Kiev, Russian Empire
- Died: April 4, 1986 (aged 81)
- Awards: Schubert Memorial Prize (1930)

Sascha Gorodnitzki (24 May 1904 – 4 April 1986) was an American concert pianist, recording artist and pedagogue at the Juilliard School of Music.

== Biography ==
=== Early life and education ===
Born in Kiev, Russian Empire, Gorodnitzki emigrated as an infant to Brooklyn, New York, where his parents founded a college of music. He was a child prodigy, but his parents had refused to allow him to embark on a performing career as a child. His teachers included his mother, then Percy Goetschius, William J. Henderson, Edwin Hughes, and Krehbiel at the Institute of Musical Art, which later became the Juilliard School. He entered the Juilliard Graduate School in 1926, where he was awarded teaching fellowship. He studied piano performance with Josef Lhévinne and composition with Rubin Goldmark, graduating with highest honors in 1932.

=== Performing career ===
Gorodnitzki won the Schubert Memorial Prize in 1930, which launched a long concert career, He made his debut with the New York Philharmonic Symphony Society and played his first Carnegie Hall solo recital in 1931. During his performing career, he toured the United States, Canada and Latin America, appearing under the direction of conductors such as Fritz Reiner, Leopold Stokowski and Pierre Monteux, among many others. He made multiple radio and television appearances.

=== Pedagogy ===
Gorodnitzki began teaching at Juilliard in 1932. In 1942 he married a pianist, Virginia Henderson (1917–2009). He also taught at the Temple University Music Festival and Institute in the late 1960s and early 1970s. In the interval between 1977 and 1979 his students won 40 major awards in world-class competitions. He was described by The New York Times as a "perfectionist" who inspired immense loyalty from his students. Those who worked with him at Juilliard included Eugene Istomin, Garrick Ohlsson, Dennis Russell Davies, Janina Fialkowska, Tom Pierson, Michael Korstick, Şahan Arzruni, Jack Winerock, Manfred Clynes, Lois Towles, Angela Cheng, Sophia Agranovich, Craig Sheppard, Dana Perelman, André Laplante and many others. His style of coaching was described as "supportive and intimidating."

Gorodnitzki remained a member of the Juilliard faculty until his death. He died of cardiac arrest in April 1986. He was 81 years old and lived in Manhattan. His widow endowed the Sascha Gorodnitzki Faculty Chair in Piano Studies, headed by Gorodnitzki's student, Eduardus Halim, at New York University’s Steinhardt School of Culture in 2008.

=== Discography ===
His recorded legacy for Capitol, EMI/Angel and Columbia includes solo works by Beethoven, Brahms, Liszt, Chopin, Schumann, Rachmaninoff, Prokofiev, Godowsky, Paderewski and Debussy. His playing was described as "electrifying" and "exciting."
