= Riccardo Zadra =

Italian pianist

Riccardo Zadra is an Italian pianist.

Zadra was awarded the 1988 Sydney Competition's 2nd prize. He has performed and recorded internationally since. He is the founder of the Accademia pianistica internazionale de Padova, presided by Aldo Ciccolini, and teaches at the Vicenza Conservatory.
