= Vitaly Samoshko =

Ukrainian pianist

Vitaly Samoshko Віталій Самошко
- Born: 13 July 1973 (age 52); Kharkiv, Ukrainian SSR, Soviet Union
- Genres: Classical
- Occupation: Pianist
- Instrument: Piano

Vitaly Samoshko (Note: Ukrainian: Віталій Самошко, romanized: Vitalii Samoshko) (born 13 July 1973) is a Ukrainian pianist. Born in Kharkiv, Samoshko settled in Belgium in 2001.

His first significant achievement was a 6th prize at the 1992 Sydney International Piano Competition. He was subsequently awarded 2nd prizes at the 1993 Concorso Busoni, the 1996 Concours de Montreal and the 1998 Arthur Rubinstein Competition before winning the 1999 Queen Elisabeth Competition. He has built an international concert career since.

== See also ==
Queen Elisabeth Music Competition
