= Rex Hobcroft =

Australian musician

Rex Hobcroft AM (12 May 1925 – 23 September 2013) was an Australian pianist, conductor, composer, teacher, competition juror and music administrator. He was the first Australian pianist to play the complete cycle of Beethoven's piano sonatas in public; he directed both the Tasmanian and New South Wales State Conservatoria of Music; and he co-founded the Sydney International Piano Competition.

== Biography ==
Rex Kelvin Hobcroft was born in Renmark, South Australia in 1925. During World War II he flew in the RAAF, and when over joined then small emerging Ansett Airways to pilot for them for several months. He slipped into studying part-time at the Melbourne Conservatorium of Music, full-time from 1946 and graduated in 1948 with First Class Honours. He travelled to Paris for further study at the École Normale de Musique in 1949–50.

In 1952 he became an Examiner for the Australian Music Examinations Board, and from 1952–56 he worked as a school music specialist with the Music, Speech and Drama Branch of the Western Australian Education Department.

In July 1957 he wrote incidental music for a production in St George's Cathedral, Perth of T. S. Eliot's play Murder in the Cathedral.

== Queensland Conservatorium of Music ==
In 1957 Rex Hobcroft was appointed foundation head of the keyboard department of the Queensland Conservatorium of Music in Brisbane. He was only the second pianist appointed to a full-time teaching position at a conservatorium in Australia. He retained this position until 1961.

During these years he was also active as a solo, concerto and chamber music pianist and vocal accompanist, and travelled widely in Australia. He also presented a series of music appreciation programs on ABC Radio.

== Tasmania ==
In 1961 Hobcroft became Foundation Head of the Music Department of the University of Tasmania in Hobart. In 1962 he presented the complete cycle of piano sonatas of Ludwig van Beethoven in a series of weekly recitals in Hobart, a first for an Australian pianist. Among the audience was the poet Gwen Harwood, and she was inspired to dedicate a number of poems to Rex Hobcroft (including Four Impromptus and Estuary). The following year, Hobcroft introduced Harwood to the composer Larry Sitsky, which proved to be the start of an artistic collaboration that eventually produced six operas: The Fall of the House of Usher (1965), Lenz (1970), Fiery Tales (1975), Voices in Limbo (1977), The Golem (1980, performed 1993), and De Profundis (1982)

He organised a National Composers' Seminar in Hobart in 1963. This was attended by a majority of Australia's then recognised composers. In conjunction with a similar seminar in 1965, he conducted the world premieres of three Australian operas. These included The Fall of the House of Usher (19 August 1965, Theatre Royal, Hobart). He was later a co-founder and conductor of the Tasmanian Opera Company.

=== Tasmanian Conservatorium of Music ===
In 1964, Rex Hobcroft was appointed the founding Director of the Tasmanian Conservatorium of Music, a position he retained until 1971.

During that time (1967), he travelled to the United States, Canada, England and Asia as a Tasmanian Churchill Fellow, studying music education methods.

In 1968 he studied at the Tokyo University of the Arts.

== New South Wales State Conservatorium of Music ==
Hobcroft directed the New South Wales State Conservatorium of Music (now known as the Sydney Conservatorium of Music) between 1972 and 1982. The year after he took over, the first jazz course to be offered by an Australian tertiary institution commenced there. This followed an approach by the jazz musician Don Burrows. He also oversaw the first courses in church music and electronic music, a rich visiting artists program, and the establishment of regional music centres. Other courses and activities expanded on an unprecedented scale, and Hobcroft's influence over ten years is considered as significant as that of Sir Eugene Goossens in the 1950s. During his leadership, the Conservatorium adopted the modern educational profile recognised today. His vision of a "Music University" was realised, in which specialised musical disciplines including both classical and jazz performance, music education, composition and musicology enriched each other.

In 1973 he conducted Larry Sitsky's The Fall of the House of Usher in what was the first evening performance of an opera in the Sydney Opera House.

From 1972 to 1982, he was President of the Federated Music Clubs of Australia.

== Sydney International Piano competition ==
In 1976 Rex Hobcroft initiated and co-founded the Sydney International Piano Competition, along with Claire Dan and Robert Tobias. He was Chairman of the Jury for the inaugural competition in 1977, and again for the 1981, 1985 and 1988 competitions. In that time he introduced many innovations that have been adopted by several other international competitions.

In 1981, Peter Sculthorpe dedicated to Hobcroft his piano piece Mountains, which had been commissioned by the Piano Competition. James Penberthy's Bedlam Hills for chorus and piano is dedicated "to horny Hobcroft".

After retiring from the New South Wales Conservatorium, he returned to Perth, Western Australia. But formal retirement did not mean an end to his musical activities. He chaired the Western Australian State Government's Conservatorium Committee. This recommended the establishment of a Conservatorium of Music in that state, which was implemented in 1985 as the UWA School of Music.

From 1992 to 1998 he was Patron of the Australian International Conservatorium.

Hobcroft was a supporter of the Suzuki method of music teaching for many years. He introduced it to the Tasmanian and Sydney conservatoria, and was the Patron of the New South Wales and later the Western Australian arms of the Suzuki Talent Education Association of Australia.

== Music competition juror ==
In addition to his chairmanship of the jury of the Sydney International Piano Competition 1977-88, Rex Hobcroft was invited to join the juries of a number of other significant international music competitions. These included:

- X International Chopin Piano Competition, Warsaw, 1980
- 54th World Piano Competition, Cincinnati, 1989
- X Paloma O'Shea International Piano Competition, Santander, 1990; and Adviser to the XVII competition in 2012
- 1st China International Piano Competition, 1994
- XIV International Tchaikovsky Competition, Moscow, 1998
- 9th UNISA International Piano Competition, Pretoria, South Africa, 2000
- International Ettore Pozzoli Piano Competition, Seregno, Italy
- Liszt-Bartok Competition, Budapest
- Gina Bachauer International Piano Competition, USA

== Honours ==
In 1977 Rex Hobcroft was awarded the Queen Elizabeth II Silver Jubilee Medal. In the Queen's Birthday Honours of June 1990, he was named a Member of the Order of Australia (AM).

In December 2004, the University of Tasmania awarded him an Honorary Doctorate of Letters.

In 2007 Griffith University honoured him as a Doctor of the University.

== Personal ==
Rex Hobcroft was married and divorced three times, to Victoria, Loretta (Lory) Lightfoot and Perpetua Durack-Clancy. He was father of four children and grandfather of six.

He wrote an unpublished autobiography, titled Australia's Con man. The manuscript forms part of the National Library of Australia's holdings of Rex Hobcroft papers.

He died in Perth on 23 September 2013, aged 88.
