= André Laplante =

Canadian pianist

André Laplante, OC (born November 12, 1949) is a Canadian (Québécois) pianist. He received a 2004 Juno Award for the 2003 recording Concertos: Music of Jacques Hétu. He is considered to be a Franz Liszt specialist and is also much associated with the music of Maurice Ravel.

== Education and early career ==
Born in Rimouski, Quebec, Canada, Laplante began studying piano at seven and continued after 1964 at the École Vincent-d'Indy with Natalie Pépin and Yvonne Hubert. In 1965 he won the Montreal Symphony Orchestra (MSO) Matinées prize for young performers, and in 1968 he took first prize at the MSO Concours and the Quebec Music Festivals. He continued his studies during 1970–1971 in New York at the Juilliard School with Sascha Gorodnitzki and, with the aid of Canada Council grants, during 1971–1974 in Paris with Yvonne Lefébure. He worked again in 1976–1978 at Juilliard with Gorodnitzki. By this time he had performed as soloist with several Canadian orchestras, and in 1974–1975 had toured for the Jeunesses musicales of Canada (Youth and Music Canada).

== Career from 1978 to present ==
Laplante was awarded 3rd prizes at the inaugural edition of the Sydney Competition and the XV Long-Thibaud Competition. He shared second place with French pianist Pascal Devoyon at the 1978 International Tchaikovsky Competition. Laplante made his debut at Carnegie Hall on October 21, 1978.

He has received two Felix Awards for his recordings. At the award ceremonies of 2004, Laplante received a Juno Award in the category Classical Album of the Year – Large Ensemble or Soloist(s) with Large Ensemble Accompaniment for the recording Concertos: Music of Jacques Hétu. The same album was placed on the Fanfare's best discs list for 1996. He was awarded the Order of Canada on October 29, 2004 and invested to the Order on June 10, 2005.
