= Ueli Wiget =

Ueli Wiget (born 1957 in Winterthur) is a Swiss pianist, harpsichordist and harpist.

He was prized at the 1985 Sydney Competition. Since 1986 Wiget is a member of the Ensemble Modern, a chair he combines with an international concert career.
