= Jack Winerock =

American classical pianist

Jack Winerock

Jack Winerock is an American classical pianist and piano professor in the Department of Music and Dance in the School of Fine Arts at the University of Kansas, United States.

== Biography ==
A native of New York City, Winerock attended The High School of Music & Art and received his undergraduate and master's degrees from the Juilliard School and his doctorate from the University of Michigan. His teachers included Sascha Gorodnitzki, György Sándor, and Leon Fleisher. Following his graduation from Michigan, he accepted an appointment at the University of Kansas.

In 1976, Winerock received second prize in the International Bach Competition. That year he made his orchestral debut with the National Symphony Orchestra at the Kennedy Center in Washington, D.C. In 1979 he made his New York debut at Alice Tully Hall in Lincoln Center. Since that time he has received yearly invitations to perform in Europe and South America as well as in the U.S. In 1986 he gave the first performance of George Gershwin's Rhapsody in Blue in the People's Republic of China and in 1988 performed for the first time in Japan. He has recorded the Sonatas of Alexander Reinagle (teacher of George Washington's children) for the Musical Heritage Society and the Concerto for Piano and Winds by Igor Stravinsky for Golden Crest Records.

Winerock has received national and international acclaim as a teacher, clinician, and adjudicator. His students have won prizes in national and international competitions, including the International Frederick Chopin Piano Competition in Warsaw and the Music Teachers National Association (MTNA). His students hold faculty positions both in the United States as well as in conservatories in Europe, South America, and Japan. In addition to his duties at the University of Kansas, he has served as visiting professor at the Chopin Academy in Warsaw, the Herzliya Conservatory in Israel, and at Middlesex University in London, England. He is a longtime faculty member of the International Institute for Young Musicians, as well as the Music Fest Perugia and Beijing International Music Festival & Academy.

He is married to Susan Elkins, the daughter of historian Stanley Elkins. They have two daughters.

== The Pianist's Dictionary entry for Jack Winerock ==
"American pianist, he studied at The Juilliard School with Gorodnitzki and the University of Michigan with Fisher. He has also studied with Fleischer and Shure. He has concertized in Europe, the United States, Canada, and the Far East. He performs early American piano music (especially that of Reinagle) with a special understanding, but he performs a broad range of repertoire. He has also made recordings that demonstrate his ability to perform with profound respect for the composer's intentions."

== Winerock in the News ==
- "A grand reward" The Oread (June 5, 1998) -- Winerock's students win competition
- "PSU sponsors guest piano recital" Pittsburg State University (Feb. 24, 2003)
- "'Surprise Patrol' delivers Kemper Award to piano professor today" KU News (Sept. 2, 2003)
- "Lied Center hosts piano competition" The University Daily Kansan (July 6, 2004)
- "Internationally acclaimed pianist Dr. Jack Winerock will judge Morningside College’s Young Artist Piano Competition" Morningside College (Feb. 16, 2005)

== Sources and External Links ==
- Jack Winerock—faculty page, University of Kansas
- KU Experts Guide—Jack Winerock (Professor of Piano)
- The Fryderyk Chopin Academy of Music—official site (in Polish, English)
