= Chia Chou =

Taiwanese pianist (born 1961)

Chia Chou (born 1960) is a Taiwanese-born Canadian pianist. He settled in Germany in the 1980s.

He had his first public performance at age 7. In 1980 and 1981, he won the Mendelssohn Competition in Berlin and the second edition of the Sydney Competition; a wide international concert career ensued. In 1983, he became the first artist with Chinese ancestry living abroad to perform in China since the Cultural Revolution.

Chou is a member of the Parnassus Trio since 1990 and a professor in Chamber Music at the Kunstuniversität Graz since 2004.
