= Missouri Southern International Piano Competition =

Missouri Southern International Piano Competitio
- The International Competition of Missouri
- Status: Defunct
- Genre: Classical piano
- Venue: Missouri Southern State University
- Location: Joplin, Missouri
- Inaugurated: 1987
- Most recent: 2008
- Organizer: Vivian León

The Missouri Southern Competition was a biannual international piano competition organized by the Missouri Southern State University first held in 1987. It was dissolved in 2008 following the retirement of its director, Vivian León.

== Selected list of jurors ==
- (Uruguay) Enrique Graf
- (South Korea) Tong-Il Han
- (United Kingdom) Martin Jones
- (China) Ming-Qiang Li
- (Russia) Oleg Volkov
- (Egypt) Ramzi Yassa

== Prize winners ==
Year	1st prize	2nd prize	3rd prize
1987
Senior division	(United States) Alan Chow	(Zambia) Heather Staves	(Russia) (United States) Boris Slutsky
Junior division	(Taiwan) Diana Chiang	(United States) Michael Spaid	(Indonesia) Tina Tandela
1988
Senior division	(Hong Kong) Jackson Leung	(China) Cheng Fei Mao	(China) Xiang-Dong Kong
Junior division	(United States) Beau Mansfield	(United States) Kôji Attwood	(United States) Sarah E. Finch
1990
Senior division	(United States) Mia Chung	(United States) Steven Heyman	(United States) Hayuru Taima
Junior division	(United States) Christine Peery	not awarded	(Canada) Candice Lee
1992
Senior division	(Russia) Elisabeth Smirnova	(New Zealand) Read Gainsford	(United States) Richard Dowling
Junior division	(United States) Albert Kim	(United States) Andrew Armstrong	(Japan) Atsuko Oba
1994
Senior division	(United States) Carl Cranmer	(Italy) Roberto Corlianò	(Canada) Sasha Starcevich
Junior division	(United States) Melanie Hadley	(China) Shen Wen	(United States) Paul Hadley
1996
Senior division	(Russia) Natasha Khislenko	(Japan) Atsuko Oba	(Brazil) Derison Duarte
Junior division	(China) Jian Liu	(China) Tian Tian	(Canada) Dmitri Levkovich
1998
Senior division	(Hungary) Kriszta Kovács	(Israel) Daria Monastyrski	(Russia) Anton Mordasov
Junior division	(United States) Daniela Bracchi	(Romania) Diana Ionescu	(Taiwan) Wen-Yin Chan
			(China) Yundi Li
2000
Senior division	(South Africa) Petronel Malan	(Russia) Elissei Babanov	(Japan) Yoshikazu Nagai
Junior division	(China) Di Wu	(South Korea) Kyu-Yeon Kim	(China) Chufang Huang
2002
Senior division	(United States) Robert Henry	(China) Li Wang	(South Korea) Young-Ah Tak
Junior division	(Hong Kong) (Canada) Avan Yu	(United States) Jonathan Ware	(South Korea) Sun-Ho Lee
2004
Senior division	(China) Jie Chen	not awarded	(Italy) Sandro Russo
Junior division	(China) Wenbin Jin	(China) Chenyang Xu	(China) Si-Chen Ma
2006
Senior division	(Russia) Tatiana Tessman	(Russia) Sergei Saratovsky	(South Korea) Sang-Il Han
Junior division	(China) Xiaoqiu Xue	(Taiwan) Lo-An Lin	(United States) Mi-Eun Kim
2008
Senior division	(Hong Kong) (Canada) Avan Yu	(China) Tian Lu	(Hong Kong) Peggy Pei-Zhang Sung
Junior Division	(Uzbekistan) Behzod Abduraimov	(United States) Anna Han	(United States) Yale Work
