= Eduardus Halim =

Indonesian-American classical pianist

- Born: 1961 (age 64–65); Bandung, West Java, Indonesia
- Education: Juilliard School
- Occupations: pianist; faculty
- Awards: Sydney International Piano Competition (1985, 1988)
- Musical career
- Genres: classical music
- Instrument: piano
- Years active: 1972–present

Eduardus Halim (born 1961) is an Indonesian-American classical pianist.

Born in Bandung, Indonesia of Chinese Indonesian parents, Halim made his public debut at the age of 11 playing Beethoven's Piano Concerto No. 3. A student of Sascha Gorodnitzki and Rudolf Firkušný at the Juilliard School where he attended on full scholarship, Halim later studied with Vladimir Horowitz, to whom he was recommended by Harold C. Schonberg and David Dubal. His experience working with the late maestro is documented in Schonberg's book, Horowitz: His Life and Music. He won 4th prize at the 1985 Sydney International Piano Competition, and 3rd prize at the 1988 competition. Halim began his international concert career in 1989 after winning the Young Concert Artists International Auditions.

He is the inaugural holder of the Sascha Gorodnitzki Chair in Piano Studies and a member of the Artist Faculty at New York University's Steinhardt School of Culture, Education, and Human Development.

== Awards ==
- Winner, Piano, 1988 Young Concert Artists International Auditions, New York, USA
- Third prize, 1988 Sydney International Piano Competition, Sydney, Australia
- Forth prize, 1985 Sydney International Piano Competition, Sydney, Australia
- Third prize, 1984 William Kapell International Piano Competition, College Park, Maryland, USA

== Recordings ==
Halim's first recording, "Presenting Eduardus Halim: A Program of Piano Transcriptions," was released on the Arabesque label to wide critical acclaim. Fanfare Magazine wrote: “Winged by an effortless technique, Halim is relaxed, spontaneous, almost casual in this superhumanly demanding fare…Enthusiastically recommended!"

His second CD release, a Chopin disc for Reservoir Studio Productions, was also well received. Stephen Wigler writes, “[a]nyone who misses Vladimir Horowitz would be wise to investigate this all-Chopin recital by Eduardus Halim, the last of the master’s students; he is a born Chopinist…Rather than call him his master’s disciple, it would be better to call him his successor.” This disc was named one of the top classical instrumental CDs of 2000 by Amazon.com. Halim's latest recording for Reservoir Studio Productions features music of Enrique Granados—the piano suite Goyescas, and the seven Valses Poéticos. The American Record Guide notes, "[h]ow good is Eduardus Halim? In the Goyescas and Valses Poeticos, absolutely magnificent!…Halim continues to amaze by the rightness of his inflections and the subtlety of his rich sound palette…. This deserves a standing ovation."
