= Minsk State Musical College named after M. I. Glinka =

Coordinates: 53°54′55″N 27°31′43″E

Minsk State College of Music named after M.I. Glinka
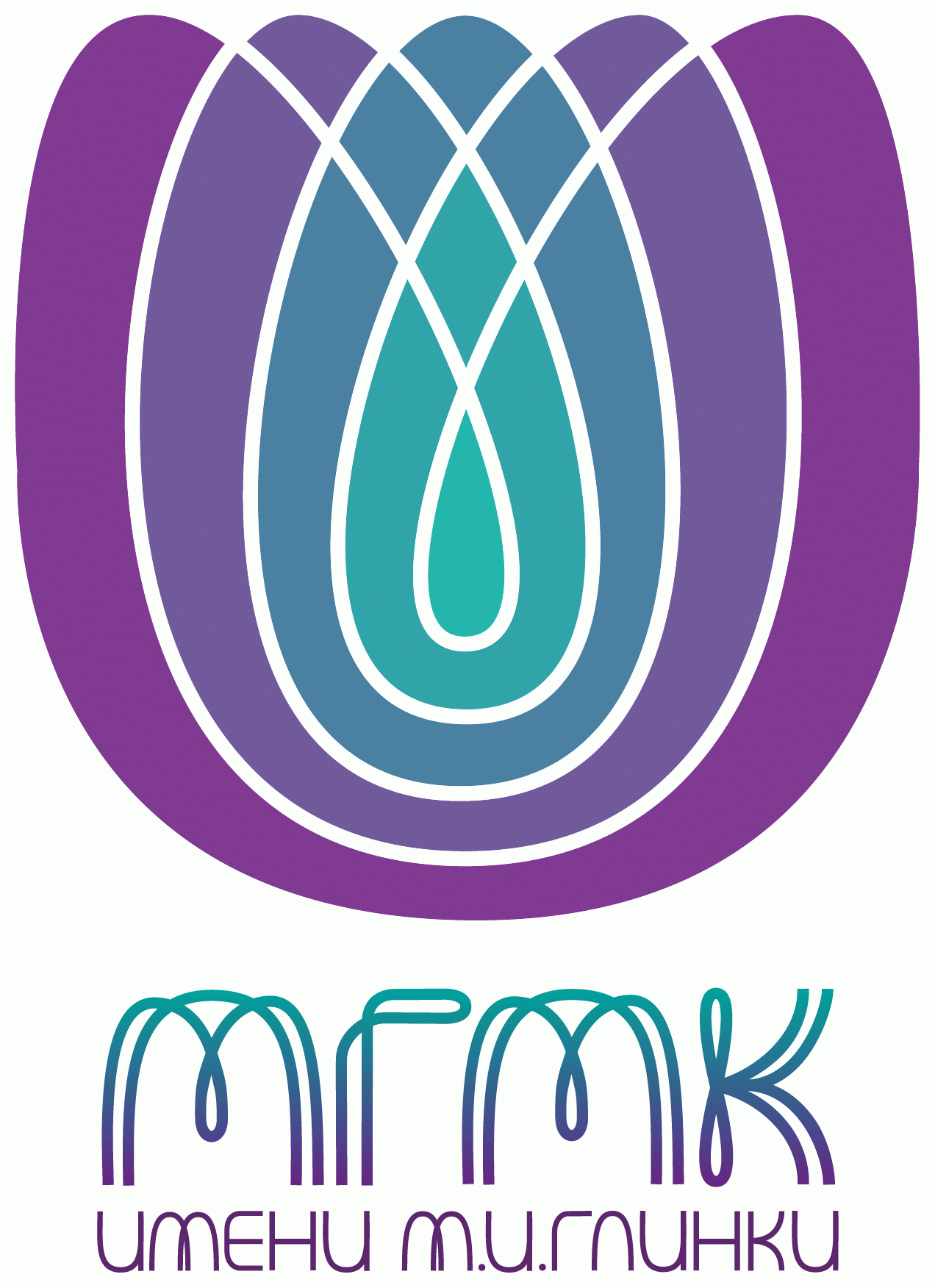

Location
- 220035, Republic of Belarus, Minsk, Griboedova st., 22; Belarus, Minsk

Information
- Type: Music school
- Established: 1924
- Principal: Snitko, Alexey Ivanovich
- Website: glinka-college.by

Minsk State College of Music named after M.I. Glinka is a state musical college in Belarus, among the oldest and most respectable culture colleges in the country.

== History ==
Founded in 1924 as Minsk musical college (Russian: Минский музыкальный техникум) with programs in piano, violin, cello, composition. In 1925 opened programs in woodwind, and percussion, in 1928 — department of conducting. In 1934 opened vocal classes.

In October 1957 the Presidium of the Supreme Soviet of the Byelorussian Soviet Socialist Republic (BSSR Supreme Soviet) awarded the college and named it in honour of Russian composer Mikhail Glinka.

In 1973 the college opened folk choir classes and in 1980 — variety arts classes.

== Education ==
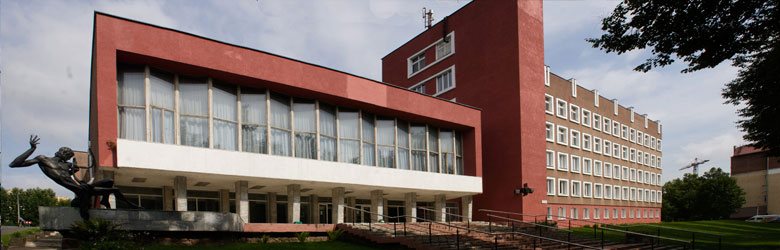
Minsk State Musical College name after Mikhail Glinka

Core curriculum for most programs covers 9 years of study. "Academic Singing" is 11 years of study.

=== Programs ===
- "Conducting (academic choir, folk choir)". Qualifications: Artist. Teacher. Leader of a creative collective.
- "Instrumental performance (piano)". Qualifications: Artist of orchestra, ensemble. Teacher. Accompanist.
- "Instrumental performance (type of instruments: strings, winds, percussion, folk instruments)". Qualifications: Artist of orchestra, ensemble. Teacher. Leader of a creative collective.
- "Academic singing". Qualifications: Artist. Teacher. Leader of a vocal studio.
- "Variety art (instrumental music)". Qualifications: Artist. Teacher. Leader of a variety band.
- "Musicology". Qualification: Teacher.

=== Statistics ===
- 89 students graduated from the college in 2017
- The college has 330 students as of September 1, 2017.
- In total there are over 9 thousands musicians and music teachers who graduated from the college over the course of 92 years and 84 graduation ceremonies.
