= Nikolai Demidenko =

Russian pianist (born 1955)

- Born: 1 July 1955 (age 71); Aniskino, Russian SSR, Soviet Union
- Genre: Classical
- Occupation: Pianist
- Instruments: Piano
- Website: https://www.demidenko.net/

Nikolai Anatolyevich Demidenko (Russian: Николай Анатольевич Демиденко; born 1 July 1955) is a Russian-born classical pianist.

== Biography ==
Demidenko studied at the Gnessin State Musical College with Anna Kantor for 12 years, and at the Moscow Conservatoire under Dmitri Bashkirov, whom he described as "an extraordinary and volatile man and for me the greatest of all teachers. As a student he turned his back on the technical programme of scales and exercises but "Kantor excused me [...] she very shrewdly offered me Chopin Etudes instead. He was a finalist at the 1976 Montreal International Piano Competition and the 1978 Tchaikovsky International Competition. His London debut was in 1985 as a result of a cancellation by Andrei Gavrilov. He taught at the Yehudi Menuhin School in the UK, where he has been a resident since 1990. He was granted British citizenship in 1995 and currently holds a visiting professorship at the University of Surrey. In addition to a vast amount of the standard Germanic and Russian repertory, he is a specialist of Frédéric Chopin and a noted champion of the works of neglected composers such as Muzio Clementi, Carl Maria von Weber, Jan Václav Voříšek, and Nikolai Medtner, as well as neglected works of well-known composers such as Domenico Scarlatti, Wolfgang Amadeus Mozart, Franz Schubert, and Robert Schumann, and transcriptions by Ferruccio Busoni. Demidenko won a Gramophone Award in 1992 in the concerto category for his recording of the Medtner Piano Concertos No. 2 and 3 with BBC Scottish Symphony Orchestra conducted by Jerzy Maksymiuk.

== Career ==
Among his appearances at the Wigmore Hall, from January to June 1993 he gave a series six recitals entitled Piano Masterworks which ranged across 250 years of music for keyboard, illustrating the development of instrumental technique and the modern piano. In 2000, in connection with the 250th anniversary of the death of Johann Sebastian Bach, Nikolai Demidenko was one of four pianists invited to perform Das Wohltemperierte Klavier, subsequently released on DVD by EuroArts.

Demidenko's extensive discography consists of nearly 40 CDs. For Hyperion Records he has recorded over 20 albums, including Prokofiev Piano Concertos nos 2 & 3 with the London Philharmonic Orchestra released in March 2015, Gramophone Editor´s Choice award-winning album of Medtner and Music for two Pianos (with Dmitri Alexeev).

For the Munich-based AGPL label he has recorded Beethoven’s Hammerklavier Sonata, a collection of Scarlatti sonatas and a Chopin CD which won the Preis der deutschen Schallplattenkritik. Autumn 2008 saw the release of a new Chopin CD, including his first recording of the 24 Preludes, for Onyx Classics. This CD won the MIDEM 2010 Special Chopin Award for a new recording, a unique occasion edited especially for a Bicentenary of Chopin. Demidenko was one of the pianists invited to perform Chopin Piano Concerto in E minor Op. 11 concert during the celebration of Bicentenary of Chopin organized by the Fryderyk Chopin Institute in Warsaw. This concert was released on DVD by Music Accentus Music

In 2014 he was awarded an honorary doctorate from the University of Surrey in recognition of his outstanding contribution to the field of Music and the University.

Early in his career he expressed strong antipathy to the notion of 'image', stating "I'm a traditionalist, ...I like wearing white tie and tails because it creates an impersonality; the audience is not surprised and concentrates on the music", adding "I believe in hard work, good luck and a good agent for the fulfilment of my dreams".
