= Michael Brimer =

Australian musician (1933–2023)

Michael Brimer (8 August 1933 – 7 March 2023) was a South African-Australian pianist, organist, conductor, composer, musicologist, and academic.

== Biography ==
Brimer was born in South Africa and studied with Eleanor Bonnar, a pupil of Leopold Godowsky. Brimer's school days were spent at the prestigious St George's Grammar School in Cape Town. He continued studies at the University of Cape Town, the Royal College of Music, the Royal School of Church Music in London and at the University of Cambridge. He also studied in Vienna and Australia, where he lived. He was music master at Brisbane’s Church of England Grammar School in the late 1950s. During that time, he staged Gilbert and Sullivan’s The Mikado, the first time an out-of-copyright G&S production had been staged in Queensland. His academic career included appointments at the University of Western Australia, Monash University and the University of Natal as Foundation Professor of Music, the University of Cape Town as Dean of the Faculty of Music. and the University of Melbourne where he was for nine years the Ormond Professor of Music. He was appointed Professor Emeritus on leaving Melbourne and was subsequently based in Sydney while performing and lecturing.

His international solo-performing career also flourished and he gave concerts in many countries as recitalist, soloist and chamber musician. In 1962 he premiered Malcolm Williamson's Piano Concerto No. 2. He was a member of The Australian Trio, along with Donald Hazelwood (violin) and Georg Pedersen (cello). He performed the complete series of Beethoven's 32 piano sonatas five times to great critical acclaim. In Australia, both the live broadcast and recorded series of the Beethoven and of the complete Schumann piano works have been voted the most popular series on ABC Classic FM in the ABC's annual listener survey. Brimer claimed to be the first pianist to record the complete Beethoven sonatas in Australia. The series of live recitals broadcast in 1986 were intended for commercial release on cassette tape, but due to a technical issue not all the sonatas were released. Gerard Willems is the first pianist in Australia to record the 32 sonatas on CD.

In January 2001, in a recital at the City Recital Hall in Sydney, he played Beethoven's Hammerklavier Sonata. The reviewer for The Sydney Morning Herald, Harriet Cunningham, said he had some memory lapses. To rebuff this, he asked Daniel Herscovitch, lecturer in music at the Sydney Conservatorium of Music, to review the tapes of the performance broadcast by ABC Classic FM. Herscovitch found there were some finger slips, but no more than might be expected of pianists of international standing, and no memory lapses at all. The Herald published his findings in their apology to Brimer on 21 February.

Michael Brimer's many performances as organist included those at the Royal Albert Hall, Clare and King’s Colleges, Cambridge, and the Sydney and Melbourne Town Halls, as well as soloist with Australian orchestras.

His conducting experience with orchestras in Australia and overseas encompassed opera, choral and orchestral repertoire, from classical to contemporary works (including premiere performances).

Brimer and his wife Judith were among the co-founders of the Bermagui Four Winds Festival, at which some of his works have been played and he appeared as a pianist.

Michael Brimer composed a number of works. Both his Piano Trios were premiered with the Australian Trio, and the first (2001) has been recorded.

In 1975, his book Utopia Unlimited was published in Cape Town.

In 2005, Brimer was appointed Music Pedagogy Adviser to the Australian Music Examinations Board (NSW), and was a member of AMEB's Teaching Specialist Panel.

Brimer was a juror for the 2006 Lev Vlassenko Piano Competition, and the 2008 Sydney International Piano Competition (SIPCA). He also assisted Warren Thomson in the Sydney auditions for the 2008 SIPCA.

Brimer died on 7 March 2023, at the age of 89.

== Sources ==
- AMEB Newsletter November 2006
