= Avan Yu =

Canadian pianist (born 1987)

Avan Yu (born 19 July 1987) is a Hong Kong-born Canadian concert pianist. He is the winner of the 12th Sydney International Piano Competition of Australia as well as the silver medalist of the XVI Paloma O'Shea Santander International Piano Competition. He has performed extensively throughout Europe, North America, Asia and Australia and at venues such as the Weill Recital Hall in Carnegie Hall, Concertgebouw in Amsterdam, the Berliner Philharmonie, the Salle Cortot in Paris, and the Sydney Opera House.

== Education ==
Avan Yu started learning piano at the age of five in Hong Kong. He studied privately with Kut Kau Sum, Kenneth Broadway and Ralph Markham in Vancouver, British Columbia, Canada. In 2007, Yu moved to Berlin, Germany, to study with Klaus Hellwig at the Berlin University of the Arts. After graduating in Berlin, he relocated to New York to pursue a Doctorate of Musical Arts degree at the Manhattan School of Music under the tutelage of the great American/Cuban pianist Horacio Gutierrez.

== Early years ==
After immigrating to Vancouver, British Columbia, Canada in 1997 with his family, he began participating in local and national competitions. He won his first national piano competition, at the age of thirteen, at the Canadian Music Competition. At the age of fourteen, he made his debut with the Vancouver Symphony Orchestra, performing Sergei Rachmaninoff's Rhapsody on a Theme of Paganini. He made front-page news of the Vancouver Sun that same year, when he won the Junior Division of the Missouri Southern International Piano Competition. Six year later, he won the Senior Division of the same competition, and became the only person in the history of that competition to ever do so.

He won the Canadian Chopin Competition at the age of seventeen and remains the competition's youngest-ever winner.

== Career ==
Yu has performed as soloist with Canadian orchestras such as National Arts Centre Orchestra, Vancouver Symphony Orchestra, Victoria Symphony, Regina Symphony Orchestra, Windsor Symphony Orchestra, Kingston Symphony Orchestra and Thunder Bay Symphony Orchestra. Internationally, he has performed with Dresden Philharmonic, Hong Kong Philharmonic Orchestra, Sydney Symphony Orchestra, Auckland Philharmonia Orchestra, and Tianjin Symphony Orchestra, among others. Musicians and conductors with whom Yu has collaborated include Pinchas Zukerman, Yo-Yo Ma, Rafael Fruehbeck de Burgos, Johannes Moser, Christian Arming, Juanjo Mena, and Bramwell Tovey.

With his hometown orchestra, the Vancouver Symphony Orchestra, he has appeared as soloist over twenty times, including touring with the orchestra in their first Canadian tour in over thirty years in 2008.

In 2008 he won the second prize at the XVI Paloma O'Shea Santander International Piano Competition in Spain. Later on, in 2012, Avan Yu won the 12th Sydney International Piano Competition of Australia, where he also received nine other special awards: Best Performance of a Beethoven Sonata, Best Performance of a Romantic Concerto, Best Performance of a Mozart Concerto, Best Performance of a Chamber Work, Best Performance of a Romantic Work, Best Performance of a work by Ravel and Best Performance of a sonata by Haydn.
