= Ran Dank =

Israeli classical pianist (born 1982)

Ran Dank רן דאנק
- Born: 3 April 1982 (age 44); Israel
- Genre: Classical music
- Occupation: Musician
- Instrument: Piano

Ran Dank (Hebrew: רן דאנק; born 3 April 1982) is an American-Israeli classical pianist, who currently lives in New York and teaches at the Eastman School of Music.

== Early life ==
Dank started playing the piano at the age of seven with Yaakov Krantz. He went on to work with Liora Peleg at the Givaataim Conservatory, and from 1994 until 2002, he studied with Professor Vadim Monastirsky of the Jerusalem Academy of Music and Dance.

From 2004 to 2005, Dank attended the Rubin Academy of Music in Tel Aviv, where he received his BA in music, studying with Professor Emanuel Krasovsky.

In 2005–07, Dank left his native Israel for the first time, to study at the Juilliard School in New York. Under the tutelage of Professors Emanuel Ax and Joseph Kalichstein, he was awarded his M.M degree in 2007.

In 2009, Dank graduated from the Juilliard School with an Artist Diploma degree, studying with Robert McDonald.

Dank received his Doctor of Music degree from the CUNY Graduate Center in 2014, having worked with pianists Richard Goode and Ursula Oppens.

== Professional career ==
Dank has given recitals and concerts in the US, Belgium, Poland, France, England, Germany, Finland, Russia and Australia, performing at prominent venues such as the Lincoln Center, Steinway Hall, Alice Tully Hall, and the Peter Jay Sharp Theater in New York, Severance Hall in Cleveland, OH, the Glazunov Hall in Saint Petersburg, and the Sydney Opera House in Sydney, Australia.

Dank has performed as a soloist with the Cleveland Orchestra, the Sydney Symphony Orchestra, the Juilliard School Orchestra, the Williamsport Symphony Orchestra, the Hilton Head Symphony Orchestra, the Rishon Lezion Symphonic Orchestra, the Jerusalem Symphonic Orchestra, and the Raanana Symphony Orchestra, amongst others.

Dank has taken part in numerous festivals, such as the Chopin Festival in Warsaw and Żelazowa Wola, performing works by Chopin and Liszt, and the Israel Festival with a complete Scriabin sonata cycle. He also played a variety of programs combining some piano rarities at the Mäntta Festival for Virtuoso Pianists, in Finland.

== Awards ==
Dank has won virtually every major prize available for a young musician in his own country. He has been a recipient of an America Israel Cultural Foundation scholarship since 1992, and a special Scholarship for Studies Abroad. Prizes in competitions in Israel include the Voice of Music Competition, and first prize, the Rafi Goralnik Award, at the Aviv Competitions in 2002. This is considered the most important competition for musicians in Israel.

In 2006, Dank won the Gina Bachauer competition held at The Juilliard School, and in 2007 he was the recipient of both the Arthur Rubinstein Prize and the 4th prize at the Cleveland International Piano Competition. In March 2008 Dank was awarded the grand prize of $15,000 and gold medal at the Hilton Head International Piano Competition, resulting in different engagements including his debut recital in Carnegie Hall in the fall of 2008. In August 2008 Dank was awarded with the third prize at the Sydney International Piano Competition including special awards by the Sydney Symphony Orchestra for the best performance of the two concertos in the final, and awards for the best performance of a work by Debussy and a work by Rachmaninov.

Most recently, Dank joined the roster of Young Concert Artists as a winner of the 2009 International Auditions.

date	award	awarded by	location
2006	first prize	Juilliard Gina Bachauer International Piano Competition	New York City, New York
2007	fourth prize	Cleveland International Piano Competition	Cleveland, Ohio, USA
2008	third prize	Sydney International Piano Competition	Sydney
2008	first prize	Hilton Head International Piano Competition	Hilton Head Island, South Carolina, USA
2009	first prize	Young Concert Artists International Auditions	New York City, USA
2010	second prize	Naumburg International Piano Competition	New York City, USA
