= Ayako Uehara (pianist) =

Japanese classical pianist (born 1980)

- Born: July 30, 1980; Japan Kagawa prefecture, Takamatsu
- Other name: 上原彩子
- Occupation: pianist

Ayako Uehara (上原 彩子, Uehara Ayako; born July 30, 1980 in Takamatsu, Kagawa Prefecture) is a Japanese classical pianist.

She won 2nd prize in the 2000 Sydney International Piano Competition. In 2002 she became the first woman (and first Japanese citizen) to win the Tchaikovsky International Piano Competition.
