= Konstantin Shamray =

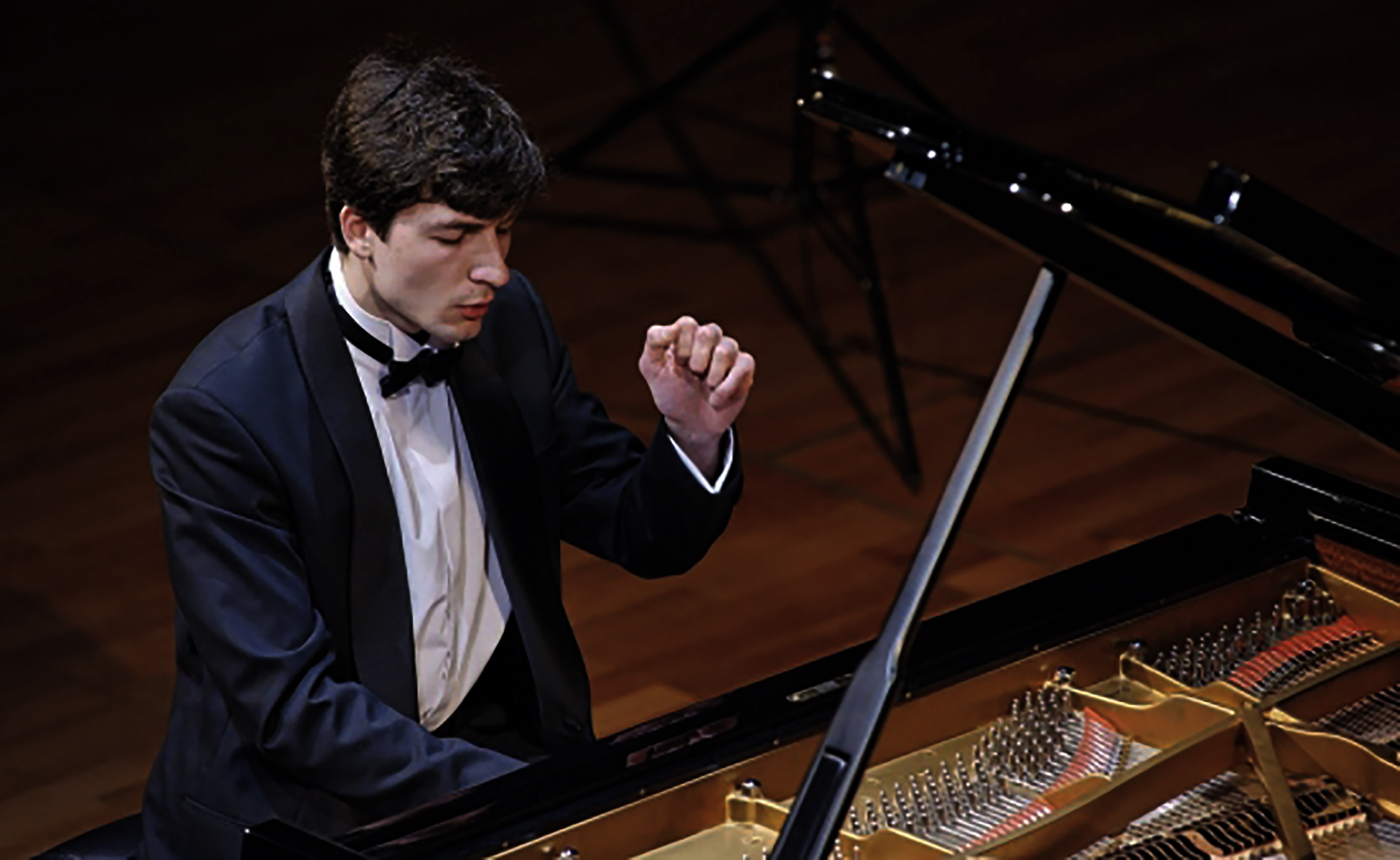

Background information
- Born: 27 May 1985 (age 40); Novosibirsk
- Genres: Classical music
- Occupation: Pianist
- Instrument: Piano
- Label: Naxos
- Website: konstantinshamray.com

Konstantin Shamray (born 27 May 1985, Novosibirsk, Soviet Union) is a Russian pianist. Shamray was born in Novosibirsk and began musical-schooling at the age of six in the Kemerovo Music School with Natalia Knobloch. From 1996 he continued his studies in Moscow at the Gnessin Special School of Music, later at the Russian Gnessin Academy of Music with Tatiana Zelikman and Vladimir Tropp, and then at Musikhochschule Freiburg with Tibor Szasz.

Konstantin came into the music scene in August 2008 as Winner of the Sydney International Piano Competition. He captured people's attention as the first in the history of the competition to take out both First and Peoples’ Choice Prize along with six other special prizes.

The young pianist has performed at such festivals as Ruhr Klavier Festival, the Bochum Festival and Kissinger Sommer in Germany, White Nights Festival in St. Petersburg, receiving critical acclaim. In October 2011 the pianist won the First prize at the piano competition Kissinger Klavierolymp and in 2013 the Luitpoldpreis (Luitpold Prize) of the festival Kissinger Sommer in Bad Kissingen, Germany.

In 2024, Konstantin Shamray was appointed at Melbourne Conservatorium of Music for keyboard performance program.
