= Andrey Pisarev =

Russian pianist

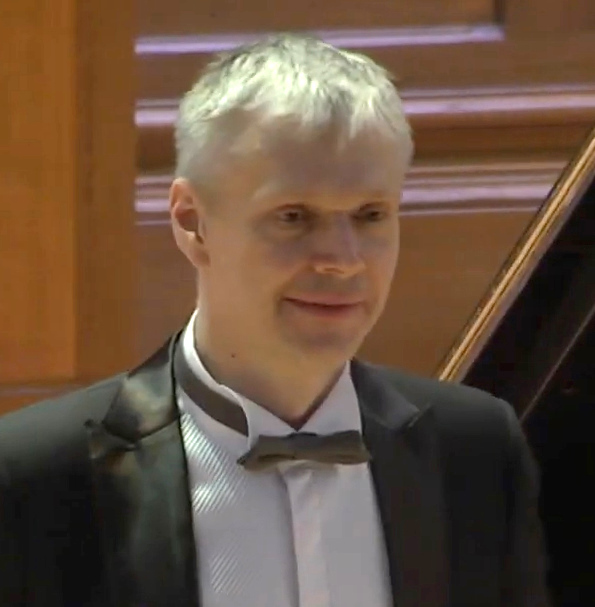
Andrey Pisarev in June 2019

Andrey Pisarev (born November 6, 1962, in Rostov-on-Don) is a Russian pianist combining an international concert career with teaching at the Moscow Conservatory, where he serves as a professor. His daughter Nadezda Pisareva, born in Moscow in 1987, is also a concert pianist.

== Career ==
In 2000 interview Andrei Pisarev said he was greatly influenced by Sergei Rachmaninoff and his teacher at the Academic Music College, Boris Abramovich Shatskes. In 1987, he graduated the college.

Since 1992, he has been an assistant in the class of Professor Sergei Dorensky. According to his profile on Moscow Conservatory's website, he is "often invited to conduct master classes in Russia, Japan, Yugoslavia, the USA, Brazil". He has been a professor at the Moscow Conservatory's Department of Special Piano under the supervision of Professor Dorensky.

== Accolades ==
Record of piano prizes
Year	Competition	Prize	1st prize winner / Ex-aequo with...
1983	(Soviet Union) Rachmaninov, Moscow	1st prize	
1991	(Austria) Mozart, Salzburg	1st prize	
1993	(South Africa) UNISA TRANSNET, Pretoria	1st prize	

Andrey Pisarev is a Merited Artist of the Russian Federation.
