= Manana Doijashvili =

Georgian pianist (1947–2023)

- მანანა დოიჯაშვილი
- Born: 5 November 1947
- Died: 17 January 2023 (aged 75)
- Education: Tbilisi State Conservatory
- Occupations: Pianist, professor of piano
- Awards: Order of the Star of Italy, People's Artist of the Georgian SSR, Zakharia Paliashvili prize (2003), Russian Performing Art Fund prize (2004)

Manana Doijashvili, OSI (Georgian: მანანა დოიჯაშვილი; 5 November 1947 – 17 January 2023) was a Georgian pianist and professor of piano.

She was trained at the Tbilisi State Conservatory under Tengiz Amirejibi. She won prizes at the 1970 Enescu (Bucharest) and the 1974 Smetana (Plzeň) competitions, and ranked 6th at the inaugural edition of the Sydney Competition.

From 2000 to 2012, Doijashvili was the rector of the Tbilisi State Conservatory, and the founder of the Tbilisi International Piano Competition. She had been named a People's Artist of the Georgian SSR was awarded the Order of the Star of Italy in 2010. She had been awarded the Zakharia Paliashvili prize (2003) and the Russian Performing Art Fund prize (2004).

Doijashvili served on the Jury of numerous other piano competitions, including the Aram Khachaturian competition, the Rhodes international piano competition, the Sydney competition, the Busoni competition, and the Horovitz competition.

Doijashvili died on 17 January 2023, at the age of 75.
