= Norma Fisher =

English pianist (born 1940)

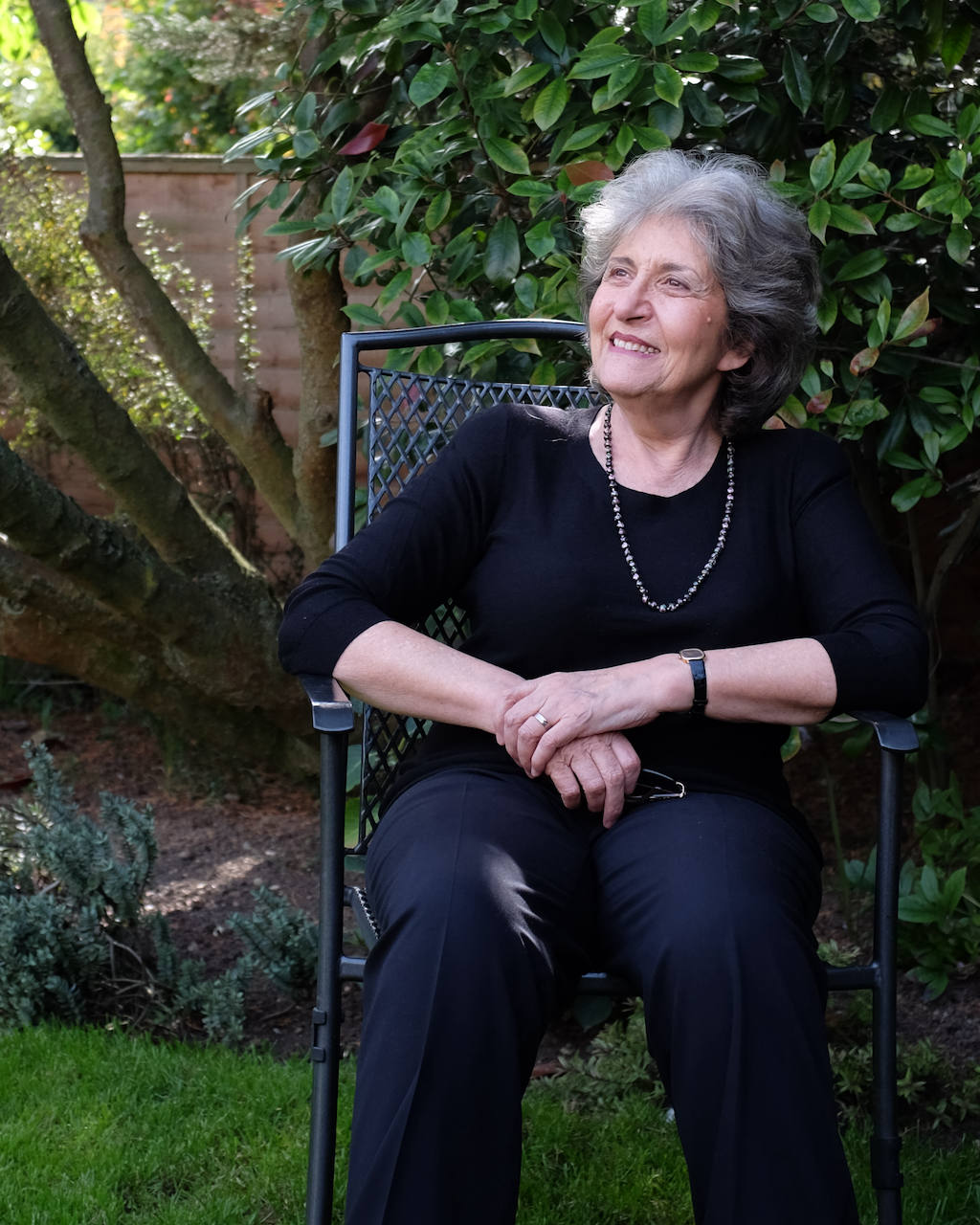
Norma Fisher in 2017

Norma Fisher (born 1940) is an English concert pianist and professor of piano living in London. Illness shortened her performing career in the 1990s and she turned instead to teaching.

== Biography ==
Norma Fisher was born in London of Russian-Polish parents. She was soon recognised as "a rare musical talent" winning an exhibition at the age of eleven, to study with Sidney Harrison at the Guildhall School of Music. At the age of fourteen she came to the attention of the celebrated Greek pianist Gina Bachauer, who became her mentor, introducing her to the distinguished Hungarian teacher Ilona Kabos, with whom she subsequently studied. A period was also spent in Paris studying French music with Jacques Février.

Her many highly acclaimed early performances for the BBC led to an invitation by the German radio station RIAS in Berlin, to make her debut with the Berlin Radio Symphony Orchestra – which launched her career in Europe. Success in the Ferruccio Busoni International Piano Competition as a top prize-winner followed, and in 1963, when she shared the much-coveted Piano Prize in the Harriet Cohen International Music Award with Vladimir Ashkenazy, her international reputation was sealed. That same year she made her debut at the Proms in the Royal Albert Hall and became a favourite soloist with leading British orchestras including the Philharmonia, London Philharmonic, London Symphony Orchestra, Royal Philharmonic, BBC Symphony, Hallé, Bournemouth Symphony, and the City of Birmingham Symphony Orchestra.

Fisher is known for her versatility as a performer, receiving acclaim worldwide as one of Britains leading pianists. This versatility extends to chamber music, which she plays with leading musicians throughout Europe. Her early relationship with the Dartington and Delme String Quartet led to a much sought-after partnership with the Stamic Quartet of Prague, both in the UK and the Czech Republic. She performs frequently with the International Chamber Ensemble of Rome, Carmina Quartet and Reykjavik Wind Quintet and has partnered such well known soloists as Stephanie Gonley, Alan Hacker, Maurice Hasson, Emanuel Hurwitz, Ralph Kirshbaum, Steven Isserlis, Peter Lukas Graf, György Pauk, Hu Kun, Sylvia Rosenberg, Grigori Zhislin, Yossi Zivoni and singers Benjamin Luxon, Sherrill Milnes, Nelly Miricioiu and Sir John Tomlinson.

Her reputation as a teacher is widely established and many of her prize-winning students are well known on the international concert circuit. She is Professor of Piano at the Royal College of Music in London – was also made a Fellow of the Royal Northern College of Music, FRNCM in 2012 – and is invited to give masterclasses throughout the world. She has performed and taught at the International Musicians' Seminar in the UK, The International Summer Academy in Lenk, Switzerland and the Horowitz Foundation Summer Music Academy in Kyiv, Ukraine. She is regularly invited on the jury of many leading international piano competitions including Young Musicians (Enschede, Holland), Gina Bachauer (USA), Horowitz (Kyiv, Ukraine), Joanna Hodges (USA), Newport (Wales), Ricardo Vines (Spain), San Marino, Sydney (Australia), Tbilisi (Georgia) and Virginia Waring (USA).

She is artistic director of London Master Classes, whose courses attract major talent from around the world to work intensively with top performers/teachers in London. London Master Classes celebrates its 30th anniversary in 2018.

== Pupils ==
Her pupils include:

- Arta Arnicane
- Polina Bogdanova
- Anna Fedorova
- Rainer Hersch
- Olga Jegunova
- Pavel Kolesnikov
- Eduard Kunz
- Murray McLachlan
- Luka Okros
- Olga Paliy
- Alexey Pudinov
- Julia Sigova
- Natalia Sokolovskaya
- Kateryna Titova
- Samson Tsoy
- Andrew Lowe Watson
- Chiyan Wong
- Zala Kravos

== Recordings ==
The three CDs collecting her BBC recordings by Sonetto Classics, "Norma Fisher at the BBC", were produced by Tomoyuki Sawado.

- Volume 1 (2018) contains recitals of music by Scriabin (1972) and Brahms (1979), The following works are included:
  - Brahms: Variations on an Original Theme Op. 21 No. 1 and No.2
  - Scriabin: Etudes Op. 42 Nos. 1, 4, 5 and 8
  - Scriabin: Piano Sonata No. 1
- Volume 2 (2019) focuses on Liszt, Schumann, Debussy and the Polish composer and pianist André Tchaikowsky, a composer Fisher championed. The album was awarded the International Franz Liszt Grand Prix Disc from the Franz Liszt Society of Budapest in 2020. It contains the following works:
  - Liszt: Mephisto Waltz 1
  - Liszt: Venezia e Napoli, Nos. I (Gondoliera), II (Canzone), III (Tarantella)
  - Liszt: Études d'exécution transcendente. Nos. 4 and 10.
  - Saint-Saëns (arr. Liszt): Danse macabre
  - Schubert (arr. Liszt): Lieder der Schubert No.9, Ständchen (Horch, horch die Lerch)
  - Schumann: Sonata 2 in G minor, Op.22 with original finale
  - Debussy: Douze Études, Book 1, No. 1; Book 2 Nos. 7, 11
  - André Tchaikowsky: Inventions, Op. 2.
- Volume 3 (2022) contains a Schumann and Brahms recital from July 1984 and a Chopin recital from October 1992. It contains the following works:
  - Schumann: Papillons, Op. 2
  - Brahms: 7 Fantasies, Op 116
  - Chopin: Mazurka in C major, Op. 68 No. 1
  - Chopin: Mazurka in C sharp minor, Op. 41 No. 1
  - Chopin: Nocturne in C sharp minor, Op. 27 No 1
  - Chopin: 3 Ecossaises, Op. 72 No. 3
  - Chopin: Berceuse, Op. 57

These recordings have been critically acclaimed:

- The Gramophone magazine's Editor's Choices (July 2018): Disc review by Michelle Assays
- Slipped disc (16 April 2018): read here
- Broadway World (16 April 2018): read here
- The Telegraph (29 May 2018): read here
- The Jewish Chronicle (2 June 2018): read here
