= Warren Thomson =

Australian musician

Warren Milton Thomson OAM (2 August 1935 – 19 February 2015) was an Australian pianist, piano competition juror, music editor, and music educator. He was best known in Australia as artistic director and chairman of the jury of the Sydney International Piano Competition after Rex Hobcroft. He auditioned all entrants, selected the competitors, and chose the repertoire and the other jurors. He was the artistic director of the Yamaha Australian Youth Piano Competition since its inception in 1994.

Warren Thomson was educated at Wesley College, Melbourne and the University of Melbourne, where he studied under Roy Shepherd, a pupil of Alfred Cortot. In 1958 and 1959 he was Junior School Music Master, Geelong Grammar School. From 1960 to 1972 he was Foundation Director of Music, Trinity Grammar School, Melbourne, where his secondary role as boarding-house master earned him a reputation as a fine cook and organiser of dinner dances. In 1970 he was the founder of the Federation of Australian Music Teachers' Association, and was its president until 1982. From 1972 to 1974 he was director of studies for the Australian Music Examinations Board, and was the chair of its New South Wales entity, the Music Examinations Advisory Board, as the delegate of the Principal of the Sydney Conservatorium of Music. He was the foundation head of the School of Extension Studies at the Sydney Conservatorium of Music, a position he held from 1974 to 1995. From 1981 to 1987 he was a member of the Conservatorium's Board of Governors. He was artistic director of professional development at the Australian Institute of Music.

Thomson organised and conducted workshops for music teachers and students throughout NSW since 1976, and coordinated more than 350 in-service courses for teachers at Sydney Conservatorium. He performed more than 1,200 new piano works for teachers and gave frequent broadcasts on piano teaching, as well as lecture-demonstrations and master classes in the US, Ukraine, China, Hong Kong and Singapore. In 1989 he was the first Australian to be invited to present a paper at the Annual Conference of the Music Teachers' Association, US.

He undertook numerous overseas study tours to investigate music education in Europe, Japan, South America, the US, Hungary, Poland and the former Soviet Union. He gave radio broadcasts in Australia and abroad, including a recording of the piano music of Aram Khachaturian in 1978, the year of the composer's death, for Moscow radio.

He adjudicated at all the major piano eisteddfods in Australia and served on international juries, including Deputy Chairman of the Piano Jury for the International Tchaikovsky Competition, Moscow, 1982 and 1990; Gina Bachauer International Piano Competition 1991; New Zealand National Concerto Competition 1993; Cincinnati World Piano Competition 1993, UNISA Transet Competition (Pretoria, South Africa) 1994; Hamamatsu International Piano Competition (Japan) 1994; Vladimir Horowitz International Piano Competition, Kiev, 1995, 1997 and 1999; Krainev Competition in Kharkov 1996; José Iturbi Competition, Valenzia, Spain, 1996; Cologne International Competition, Germany, 1996; Schubert Competition, Germany, 1999; Trani International Piano Competition, Italy, 2004 and 2006; Tbilisi International Piano Competition, Georgia, 2005; Shanghai International Piano Competition, China, 2005; Thalberg International Piano Competition Naples, Italy, 2006; and the China International Piano Competition, Xiamen, China, 2007.

In 1983 he was the Australian representative for the European Piano Teachers' Association. In 1995, was made an honorary member of the Tchaikovsky Society of Russia. In 2001 he was made an honorary fellow of the Institute of Music Teachers (Australia) and member of the Organizing Committee of the Horowitz International Piano Competition, Kiev, Ukraine. In January 2005 he was made an Honorary Professor of the Kong Xiang-Dong Music Arts College, Shanghai SIPO Polytechnic, China, and in November 2005 Honorary Professor at The Shanghai Conservatory of Music, China.

In 1987 he was awarded the Medal of the Order of Australia for his services to music education. He retired as artistic director and Chairman of the Jury of the Sydney International Piano Competition at the end of February, 2014.

His publications include the first Australian Urtext editions, and editions of works by: JS Bach, Mozart, Pachelbel, Chopin, Beethoven, Debussy, Ravel, Czerny, Schubert, Schumann, and Tchaikovsky.

Thomson died in Melbourne on 19 February 2015.

== Sources ==
- Warren Thomson website
