= List of classical music competitions =

European Classical music has long relied on music competitions to provide a public forum that identifies the strongest players and contributes to the establishment of their professional careers. This is a list of current competitions in classical music, with each competition and reference link given only once. Many offer competitions across a range of categories and in these cases they are listed under "General/mixed". Competitions with age restrictions are listed under "Young musicians".

== Chamber music ==
- Asia-Pacific Chamber Music Competition, for piano trios and string quartets, in Melbourne, Australia, every four years
- Franz Schubert and Modern Music Competition, voice and piano duo, piano trio, Graz, Austria, every three years
- Fischoff National Chamber Music Competition (Indiana, US)
- International Chamber Music Competition Hamburg for piano trios and string quartets (Hamburg, Germany)
- International Shostakovich Chamber Music Competition (Moscow, Russia)
- Melbourne International Chamber Music Competition, held in Melbourne, Australia, every four years

== Choral/voice ==
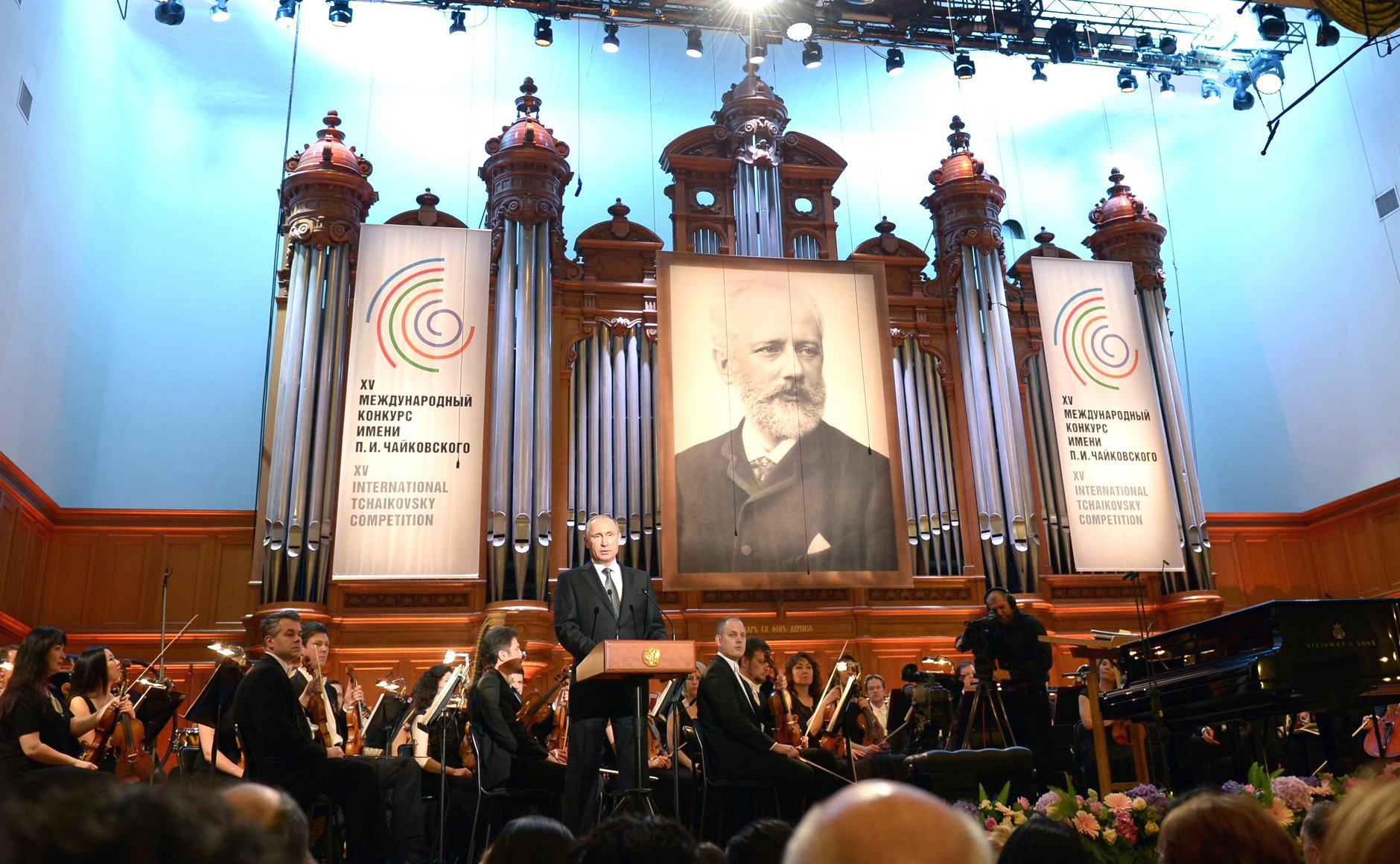
International Tchaikovsky Competition

- Australian Singing Competition (Sydney, Australia)
- Bampton Classical Opera Young Singers' Competition (UK)
- BBC Singer of the World competition (Cardiff, Wales)
- Boris Christoff International Competition for Young Singers (Sofia, Bulgaria)
- Concurs Internacional de Cant Francesc Viñas (Barcelona, Spain)
- International opera competition Lazar Jovanović (Belgrade, Serbia)
- International Johann Sebastian Bach Competition (Leipzig, Germany)
- Neue Stimmen International Singing Competition (Gütersloh, Germany)
- International Stanisław Moniuszko Vocal Competition (Warsaw, Poland)
- International Stasys Šimkus choir competition (Klaipėda, Lithuania)
- International Tchaikovsky Competition (Moscow, Russia)
- International Vocal Competition 's-Hertogenbosch ('s-Hertogenbosch, Netherlands)
- Joan Sutherland & Richard Bonynge Bel Canto Award
- The Klaudia Taev Competition for Young Opera Singers (Pärnu, Estonia).
- Lexus Song Quest (New Zealand)
- Marilyn Horne Song Competition, competition for classical singers and piano accompanists since 1997.
- Queen Sonja International Music Competition (Oslo, Norway)

== Composition ==
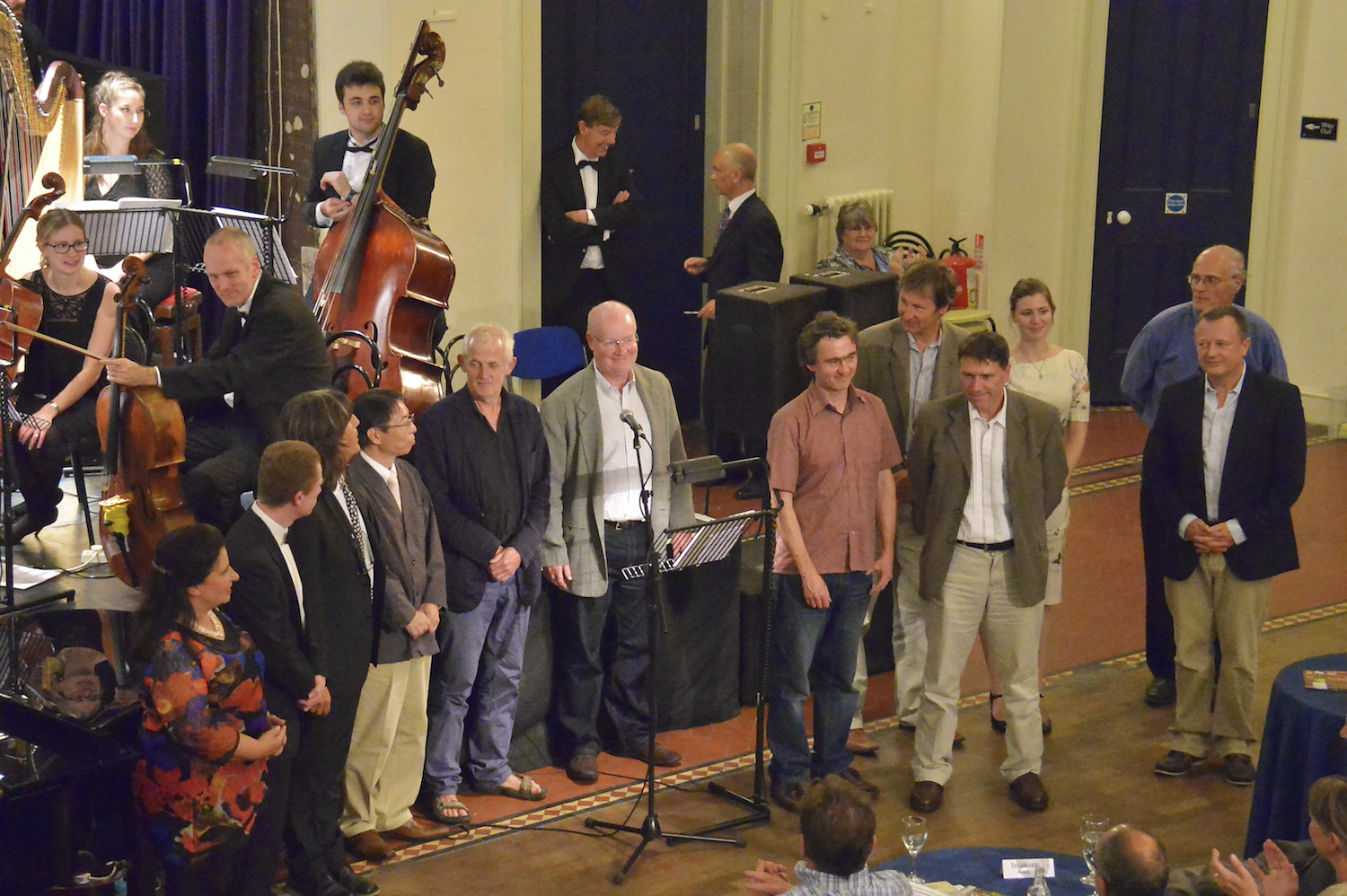
International Composers Festival

- Gaudeamus International Composers Award (Netherlands)
- George Enescu International Competition (Composition section) (Bucharest, Romania)
- International Composers Festival, Hastings and Bexhill, East Sussex, United Kingdom
- International Uuno Klami Composition Competition (Kotka/Kouvola, Finland)
- Masterprize International Composing Competition
- Queen Elisabeth Music Competition (Brussels, Belgium)
- 60x60 – International (New York, US)
- Tōru Takemitsu Composition Award (Tokyo, Japan)

== Conducting ==
- Cadaqués Orchestra International Conducting Competition (Spain)
- Khachaturian International Competition (Armenia)
- Donatella Flick Conducting Competition (UK)
- Gustav Mahler Conducting Competition (Germany)
- International Besançon Competition for Young Conductors (France)
- Jorma Panula Conducting Competition (Finland)
- La Maestra Competition for Women Conductors (France)
- Leeds Conductors Competition (UK)
- Nicolai Malko Competition For Young Conductors (Denmark)
- Sir Georg Solti International Conductors' Competition (Germany)
- The Grzegorz Fitelberg International Competition for Conductors (Poland)
- Tokyo International Music Competition for Conducting (Japan)

== General/mixed ==
Mykola Lysenko International Music Competition

- Khachaturian International Competition (Armenia)
- EUROPAfest (Bucharest, Romania)
- Grand maestro international music competition (Toronto, Canada)
- Long-Thibaud-Crespin Competition (previously International Marguerite Long-Jacques Thibaud Competition; Paris, France)
- Nishinihon International Music Competition (Fukuoka, Japan)
- Mykola Lysenko International Music Competition (Kyiv, Ukraine)
- Windsor Festival International String Competition (Windsor, UK)
- Concert Artists Guild Louis and Susan Meisel Prize (New York, US)

== Instrumental ==
- ARD International Music Competition (Munich, Germany)
- Gaudeamus Competition (Netherlands)
- International Joseph Joachim Violin Competition Hanover
- International Performers Competition Brno (Brno, Czech Republic)
- Leos Janacek International Competition (Brno, Czech Republic)
- Montreal International Music Competition (Montreal, Canada)
- Mykola Lysenko International Music Competition (Kyiv, Ukraine)
- Queen Elisabeth Music Competition (Brussels, Belgium)
- TROMP international music competition & Festival (Eindhoven, Netherlands)
- Frauchi International Competition and Festival (Moscow, Russia)

== Piano/keyboard ==
- American Piano Awards (Indianapolis, US)
- Khachaturian International Competition (Armenia)
- Anton Rubinstein Competition (Dresden, Germany)
- Arthur Rubinstein International Piano Master Competition (Tel Aviv, Israel)
- Ciutat de Carlet International Piano Competition (Valencia, Spain)
- Clara Haskil International Piano Competition (Vevey, Switzerland)
- Cleveland International Piano Competition (Cleveland, US)
- Concours Géza Anda (Zurich, Switzerland)
- Dallas International Piano Competition (Dallas, US)
- The Dranoff International Two Piano Foundation (Dallas, US)
- Epinal International Piano Competition (Epinal, France)
- EPTA - International Piano Competition Svetislav Stančić (Zagreb, Croatia)
- Ferruccio Busoni International Piano Competition (Bolzano, Italy)
- George Enescu International Competition (Piano section) (Bucharest, Romania)
- Gina Bachauer International Piano Competition (Salt Lake City, US)
- Hamamatsu International Piano Competition (Hamamatsu, JP)
- Hilton Head International Piano Competition (Hilton Head Island, South Carolina, US)
- Honens International Piano Competition (Calgary, Canada)
- International Chopin Piano Competition (Poland)
- International Ettore Pozzoli Piano Competition (Seregno, Italy)
- International Franz Liszt Piano Competition (Utrecht, Netherlands)
- International Johann Sebastian Bach Competition (organ; Leipzig, Germany)
- International Piano Competition for Outstanding Amateurs (Paris, France)
- International Tchaikovsky Competition (Russia)
- ISANGYUN Competition (Tongyeong, South Korea)
- José Iturbi International Piano Competition (Los Angeles, US)
- Kissingen Piano Olympics (Kissinger Klavierolymp, Bad Kissingen, Germany)
- Lagny-sur-Marne International Piano Competition (Lagny, France)
- Leeds International Pianoforte Competition (Leeds, UK)
- Maria Canals International Music Competition (Barcelona, Spain)
- Mykola Lysenko International Music Competition (Kyiv, Ukraine)
- International Paderewski Piano Competition (Bydgoszcz, Poland)
- Paloma O'Shea International Piano Competition (Santander, Spain)
- Panama International Piano Competition (Panama City, Panama)
- Peabody Mason International Piano Competition (Boston, US)
- Petr Eben International Organ Competition (Opava, Czech Republic)
- Pilar Bayona Piano Competition (Spain)
- Queen Elisabeth Music Competition (Belgium)
- Ricard Viñes International Piano Competition (Lleida, Spain)
- Sendai International Music Competition (Sendai, Japan)
- St Albans International Organ Competition (St Albans, UK)
- Sussex International Piano Competition (Worthing, UK)
- Sydney International Piano Competition (Sydney, Australia)
- Valencia International Piano Competition Prize Iturbi (Valencia, Spain)
- Van Cliburn International Piano Competition (Fort Worth, US)
- World International Piano Competition (Santa Fe, US)
- Silicon Valley Open Doors International Piano Competition (San Francisco, California)

== String instruments ==
- Khachaturian International Competition (Armenia)
- Carl Flesch International Violin Competition (London, UK; 1945–1992)
- Carl Nielsen International Music Competition (Odense, Denmark)
- Città di Brescia International Violin Competition (Brescia, Italy)
- Dallas International Violin Competition (Dallas, US)
- Elmar Oliveira International Violin Competition (Boca Raton, US)
- George Enescu International Competition (Violin, Cello section) (Bucharest, Romania)
- Henryk Wieniawski Violin Competition (Poznań, Poland)
- International Arthur Grumiaux Competition for Young Violinists (Brussels, Belgium)
- International Brahms Competition (Pörtschach am Wörthersee, Austria)
- International Fritz Kreisler Competition (Vienna, Austria)
- The International Harp Contest in Israel (Jerusalem, Israel)
- International Jean Sibelius Violin Competition (Helsinki, Finland)
- International Tchaikovsky Competition (Moscow, Russia)
- International Violin Competition Henri Marteau (Lichtenberg and Hof, Germany)
- International Violin Competition of Indianapolis (Indianapolis, US)
- International Violin Competition Leopold Mozart in Augsburg (Augsburg, Germany)
- ISANGYUN Competition (Tongyeong, South Korea)
- Klein Competition (San Francisco, US)
- Lionel Tertis International Viola Competition (Isle of Man, UK)
- Maurice Vieux International Viola Competition (France)
- Michael Hill International Violin Competition (New Zealand)
- Moscow International David Oistrakh Violin Competition (Moscow, Russia)
- Mstislav Rostropovich International Cello Competition (Paris, France)
- Mykola Lysenko International Music Competition (Kyiv, Ukraine)
- Paganini International Competition (Genoa, Italy)
- Primrose International Viola Competition (Albuquerque, New Mexico)
- Queen Elisabeth Music Competition (Belgium)
- Sendai International Music Competition (Sendai, Japan)
- Shanghai Isaac Stern International Violin Competition (Shanghai, China)
- Singapore International Violin Competition (Singapore)
- USA International Harp Competition (Bloomington, Indiana, US)
- Windsor Festival International String Competition (Windsor, UK)
- Yehudi Menuhin International Competition for Young Violinists (Richmond, VA, US in 2021)

== Woodwind instruments ==
- BBC Young Musician of the Year (UK)
- Fischoff National Chamber Music Competition (Indiana, US)
- Gregynog Young Musicians Competition (Wales, UK)
- International Johann Sebastian Bach Competition (Leipzig, Germany)
- International Russian Rotary Children Music Competition (Russia)
- International Tchaikovsky Competition for Young Musicians (Moscow, Russia)
- Jeunesses Musicales International (Various)
- New York International Piano Competition (New York, US)
- Prague Spring International Music Competition (Prague, Czech Republic)
- Sydney Eisteddfod (Sydney, Australia)

== Young musicians ==
- ABC Young Performers Awards (Sydney, Australia)
- Eurovision Young Musicians (Europe)
- International Tchaikovsky Competition for Young Musicians (Russia)
- National Youth Music Competition (Cape Town, South Africa)
- Stulberg International String Competition (Kalamazoo, Michigan)
- Thomas & Evon Cooper International Competition (Oberlin College, US)

== See also ==
- European Union of Music Competitions for Youth
- List of Recipients of the Terence Judd Award
- World Federation of International Music Competitions
- Category:Classical music awards
