= World International Piano Competition =

The World International Piano Competition is a classical piano competition in Santa Fe, New Mexico, which was first held in 2002, and continued in 2004-2005, 2007-2008, 2010 and 2011–2012.

The competition was founded by Lawrence D. Porter and its theme is "Seeking depth and maturity beyond virtuosity".

== Former prize winners ==
(Listed on the competition website.)

=== 2011–2012 ===
- First Place: $5,000, Alexey Sychev
- Second Place: $1,000 Angelo Arciglione
- Third Place: $500 Yangmingtian Zhao

=== 2010 ===
- First Place: $5,000, Eun-Shik Park
- Second Place: $1,500, Frank Huang
- Third Place: $500, Tzu-Feng Liu

=== 2008 ===
- First Place: $5,000, Christopher Atzinger
- Second Place: $2,000, Esther Park
- Third Place: $1,000, Mauricio Arias
- Fourth Place: $500, Noel Engebretson
- Fifth Place (tie): $250 - Michael Schneider & Rena Rzayeva

=== 2005 ===
Solo Division
- First Place (tie): Yuri Chayama & Mana Tokuno
- Second Place: Fred Karpoff
- Third Place: Michael Schneider

Concerto Division
- First Place (tie): Fred Karpoff & Ioannis Potamousis

== See also ==
- List of classical music competitions
- World Federation of International Music Competitions
