= Domenico Nordio =

Italian violinist

Domenico Nordio (born 21 March 1971) is an Italian violinist.

== Biography ==
Nordio was born in Piove di Sacco on 21 March 1971. He is a member of the Nordio family.

Nordio studied violin with Corrado Romano and Michèle Auclair. He began his concert career very young, winning the Vercelli "Viotti" International Competition at the age of 16, with Yehudi Menuhin as President of the panel of judges. Successes followed at competitions such as the "Thibaud" in Paris, the "Sigall" in Viña del Mar and the "Francescatti" in Marseille and, in particular, in 1988 the "Eurovision" which brought him international fame thanks to the final round broadcast throughout Europe from the Concertgebouw in Amsterdam.

Since then, his intense work schedule as a soloist has brought him to perform all over the world. He has played in London (Barbican Centre), Paris (Salle Pleyel), Tokyo (Suntory Hall), Geneva (Victoria Hall), Madrid (Teatro Monumental), Dublin (National Concert Hall), Istanbul (Atatürk Centre), Rome (Accademia di Santa Cecilia e Teatro dell’Opera), Moscow (Conservatoire Tchaikovskij), New York City (Carnegie Hall), Vienna (Konzerthaus), Zürich (Tonhalle), St.Petersburg (Philharmonic Great Hall), Prague (Spring Festival), Milan (Teatro Alla Scala) and with many prestigious orchestras.

In Italy, he has performed almost everywhere. He signed a recording agreement with the Sony Music Group and his first CD for Sony Classical was released in March 2013. He is currently the Artistic Director of the Città di Brescia International Violin Competition, competition member of the WFIMC (World Federation of International Music Competitions).

== Discography ==
- Busoni and Malipiero, Violin Concertos (Sony Classical)
- Respighi, Dallapiccola and Petrassi, Violin Concertos (Sony Classical)
- Casella and Castelnuovo Tedesco, Violin Concertos (Sony Classical)
- Mozart, Violin Concertos (Velut Luna)
- Mendelssohn, Violin Concertos (Amadeus)
- Ysaÿe, Sonatas op.27 (Decca)
- Brahms, Sonatas for Viola and Violin (Decca)
- "Capriccio", Recital (Decca)
