= Humet =

Humet is a surname. Notable people with the surname include:

- Javier Humet (born 1990), Spanish handball player
- Ramón Humet (born 1968), Spanish composer
