= International Singing Competition of Toulouse =

The International Singing Competition of Toulouse (French: Concours international de chant de Toulouse) is an international classical singing competition run by the Théâtre du Capitole in Toulouse, France.

== History ==
First edition took place in 1954. Held annually from 1954 to 1994 (except in 1973), the competition was not held in 1995 due to theatre renovation work. When it resumed in 1996, the competition became biannual. The Competition has been a member of the World Federation of International Music Competitions since 1958.

In the 1970s and 1980s, the competition was marked by the large number of winners from the USSR, the United States and Romania. Since the mid-2000s, South Korea has been the winner, with 4 consecutive tenors having won the Grand Prix from 2008 to 2016.

== Organization ==
=== Jury ===
The jury is made up of artistic directors of major theaters and opera houses, mainly in Europe, with the notable participation of the Metropolitan Opera of New York (on 12 occasions). During the various editions, it has notably been chaired by Emmanuel Bondeville, Daniel-Lesur, Marcel Landowski, Raymond Gallois-Montbrun, Rolf Liebermann and Hugues Gall. Several foreign celebrities were also jurors, including tenors Ferruccio Tagliavini and Giuseppe Di Stefano, or even sopranos Rita Streich, Birgit Nilsson, Leyla Gencer, Teresa Stich-Randall or Edda Moser.

=== Participants ===
The competition is open to young singers of all nationalities from 18 to 33 years. Applicants must present a program comprising six titles in the Mélodie, Lied, Oratorio categories, and six extracts from operas, with at least one French composer.

== See also ==
- List of classical music competitions
