= Dranoff International Two Piano Competition winners =

Music competition

The following is a list the Dranoff International Two Piano Competition Winners. The competition was founded in 1987 by the Dranoff International Two Piano Foundation. The Competition has been a member of the World Federation of International Music Competitions since 1997.

2013

1st Prize Winners - Duo Yamamoto

2nd Prize Winners - Duo Yoo & Kim

3rd Prize Winners - Duo imPuls

2008

1st Prize Winners - Silivanova-Puryzhinskiy

2nd Prize Winners - Susan & Sarah Wang

3rd Prize Winners - Piano Duo Humburger

2005

1st Prize Winner - Seo & Kato

2nd Prize Winner - Piano Duo Varshavski and Shapiro

3rd Prize Winner - De Stefano Piano Duo

2003

1st Prize Winner - Tengstrandt and Sun Piano Duo

2nd Prize Winner - Duo Chipak & Kushnir

3rd Prize Winner - Duo Antithesis

2001

1st Prize Winner - Duo D’Accord

2nd Prize Winner - Makarova-Koltakov Duo

3rd Prize Winner - Mogilevsky-Smolina Piano Duo

1999

1st Prize Winners - Trivella Duo

2nd Prize Winners - Duo Koltyar-Shifrin

3rd Prize Winners - Horus Duo

1997

1st Prize Winners - Duo Turgeon

Edward Turgeon and Anne Louise-Turgeon

2nd Prize Winners - Genova & Dimitrov
Genova & Dimitrov Piano Duo
Genova & Dimitrov Piano Duo

3rd Prize Winners - Alexeytchuck and Kot

1995

1st Prize Winners - Marton and Batzner

2nd Prize Winners - Piano Duo Zacharov

3rd Prize Winners - Duo Van Veen

1993

1st Prize Winners - Elkina Piano Duo

2nd Prize Winners - Ishikawa and Kratzert

3rd Prize Winners - Bergman Duo

1991

1st Prize Co-Winners - Lisitsa and Kuznetsoff

1st Prize Co-Winners - Duo Zheleznov

2nd Prize Not Awarded

3rd Prize Winners - Lewis & Perry Duo

1989

1st Prize Winners - Goldina and Lumbrozo

2nd Prize Winners - Stenzl Piano Duo

3rd Prize Winners - Anne Marie and Monique Mot

1987

1st Prize Winners - Morel-Nemish

2nd Prize Winners - Hecht-Shapiro

3rd Prize Winners - Goldina and Lumbrozo
