= Fred Karpoff =

American pianist and music educator

Fred Karpoff (born January 28, 1963) is an American pianist and music educator, renowned for developing both the 3-D Piano Method of piano playing and teaching and the Entrada Piano Technique. Karpoff received his undergraduate education at Northwestern University, and his Doctor of Musical Arts (DMA) from the Peabody Conservatory. He is Professor of Piano and Ensemble Arts and co-chair of the keyboard department at the Setnor School of Music, Syracuse University.

== Education ==
Karpoff graduated from Walnut Hills High School in Cincinnati, Ohio and received his undergraduate degree at Northwestern University, studying under Robert Weirich. He earned his master's and doctoral degrees from the Peabody Institute, while studying with Ann Schein Carlyss, Leon Fleisher, and Yoheved Kaplinsky. He performed in master classes for Murray Perahia, Menahem Pressler, Paul Badura-Skoda, Lazar Berman, Gabriel Chodos, and Boris Berman, and received extensive coaching from Richard Goode and Karl Ulrich Schnabel.

== Performing career ==
Karpoff has won prizes in several international piano competitions (San Antonio, Competition Internationale, Frinna Awerbuch) and was a semi-finalist in the AXA Dublin International Piano Competition. He served as a USIA Artistic Ambassador to Germany, Luxembourg, Belgium, Ghana, Zimbabwe, and Ireland.

Chamber music and vocal coaching have been central to Karpoff's career. He has held residencies at festivals in Siena and Montecatini, and given numerous performances at the Skaneateles Festival in central New York. He has performed with other musicians, including violinists Curtis Macomber, Steven Copes, Mark Fewer and Harumi Rhodes; violist Michelle LaCourse, cellists Clive Greensmith, Peter Rejto and, Shauna Rolston; clarinetist Larry Combs, flutist Marina Piccinini, and hornist Eric Ruske. He had a longstanding professional duo with his wife, soprano Rebecca Karpoff. From 2007 to 2011, he was the pianist of the Boccaccio Trio with violinist Jeremy Mastrangelo and cellist David Ledoux. He performed as soloist in six concerti with the Syracuse Symphony Orchestra from 2000 to 2010, including in the ensemble's final Contributors Concert. An international Steinway artist, Karpoff has also performed in France, Italy, China, India, Finland, and Canada.

He released Heroic Tales: Piano Music of Edward MacDowell on the Sonatabop label, and Renegade Classics issued his live Beethoven Trio performances with musicians at the Skaneateles Festival, in addition to the albums This Moment and Snapshots with soprano Rebecca Karpoff.

== Teaching and Lecturing ==
Karpoff began his teaching career as an assistant at Peabody and as a faculty associate at Johns Hopkins University. He taught for one year at the University of Maryland, Baltimore County before accepting a professorship at Syracuse University in 1991. Karpoff served as a Visiting Professor of Piano at the Eastman School of Music in the fall of 2011. In 2013, he taught in Strasbourg, France as part of Syracuse University's study-abroad music program.

Karpoff presents workshops and master classes throughout North America and abroad, including appearances at MTNA Conferences, the National Conference on Keyboard Pedagogy, and the East-West Asia Conference. He is regularly featured as the conference artist and clinician for state and provincial music teachers’ associations, including those in Texas, California, Oregon, Oklahoma, Kansas, New York, Pennsylvania, Utah, Alabama, Alberta, North Carolina, and South Carolina.

== Video Pedagogy ==
In 2007, Karpoff began working with documentary filmmaker and Syracuse University professor Richard Breyer on 3-D Piano: The Three-Dimensional Pianist, a six-part series on piano teaching and playing, featuring a demonstration of Karpoff's 3-D Method. Released in 2009, 3-D Piano was awarded the Frances Clark Keyboard Pedagogy Award by Music Teachers National Association in 2011.

In 2014, Karpoff created Entrada Piano Technique, an online video resource designed to promote effortless piano technique. From 2017 to 2019, he served as Director of Professional Development for the Faber Piano Institute. In 2020, he relaunched Entrada Piano Technique as Entrada Piano.
