= Ciutat de Tarragona International Award for Musical Composition =

The Ciutat de Tarragona International Award for Musical Composition (formerly known as Tarragona International Musical Composition Prize or Ciutat de Tarragona International Composition Competition) is a composition competition taking place yearly in Tarragona (Catalonia, Spain), organized by the Tarragona City Council. It was founded in 1993, and was accepted into the World Federation of International Music Competitions in 1996.

== The competition ==
The competition is open to all composers, regardless of nationality or age. Symphonic works with or without soloists (up to a maximum of 3 are allowed) and with or without electro-acoustic devices are eligible. Submitted works must be unpublished, must never have been performed in public or have received any award, whether under their current title or any other, and must not have been previously commissioned. The winning composition is premiered the following year by the Barcelona Symphony and Catalonia National Orchestra and awarded a 12,000 euro cash prize (in 2010).

== Juries ==
Members of the jury have included Josep M. Mestres Quadreny, Hèctor Parra, Jean Pierre Dupuy, Vicent Paulet, Tomás Marco, Antón García Abril, Martín Matalon, José Manuel López López, Agustí Charles Soler, Albert Sardà, Josep Soler, Edmon Colomer, Joan Guinjoan, Enrico Correggia, and Jordi Cervelló.

== Winners ==
Prize-winners include:

- 1993 Alejandro Civilotti and Jean Gabriel Vincent Paulet
- 1994 Agustí Charles Soler and Robert Patterson
- 1995 Yang Yong and Lance R. Hulme
- 1996 Agustí Charles Soler and Hiroshi Nakamura
- 1997 Hiroshi Nakamura and Antonio Priolo
- 1998 Jen Michel Gillard and Charles Norman Mason
- 1999 Thomas Ingoldsby
- 2000 Sergio Blardony Soler
- 2001 Carlos Satué Ros
- 2002 Luca Belcastro
- 2003 Andrés Luis and Maupoint Alvárez
- 2004 Paolo Boggio
- 2005 Eduardo Soutullo García
- 2006 José Luis Campana
- 2007 Musheng Chen
- 2008 Ramón Humet
- 2009 - (no competition)
- 2010 Xavier Pagès i Corella.
