= Gildas Quartet =

British string quartet

The Gildas Quartet is a British string quartet.

== History ==
The Gildas Quartet formed at the Royal Northern College of Music in 2011. They have studied with Oliver Wille, Robin Ireland, and Catherine Manson, and have also benefited from masterclasses from Alfred Brendel, Paul Cassidy, Gabor Takacs Nagy, and András Keller, among others.

They have performed at major venues such as the Wigmore Hall, Carnegie Hall (via video) and Purcell Room. In 2013 they performed live on BBC Radio 3 program In Tune.

The Gildas Quartet were semi-finalists at the Melbourne International Chamber Music Competition in 2018. The same year, the quartet received the Audience Engagement Award in the Franz Schubert and Modern Music Competition held in Graz.

== Affiliations ==
The quartet are City Music Foundation Artists and Associate Ensemble at the Birmingham Conservatoire.

== Members ==
The Quartet currently consists of Christopher Jones, Gemma Sharples (violin), Kay Stephen (viola) and Anna Menzies (cello); past members were Hatty Haynes (first violin) and violist Francesca Gilbert.
