= Nordio =

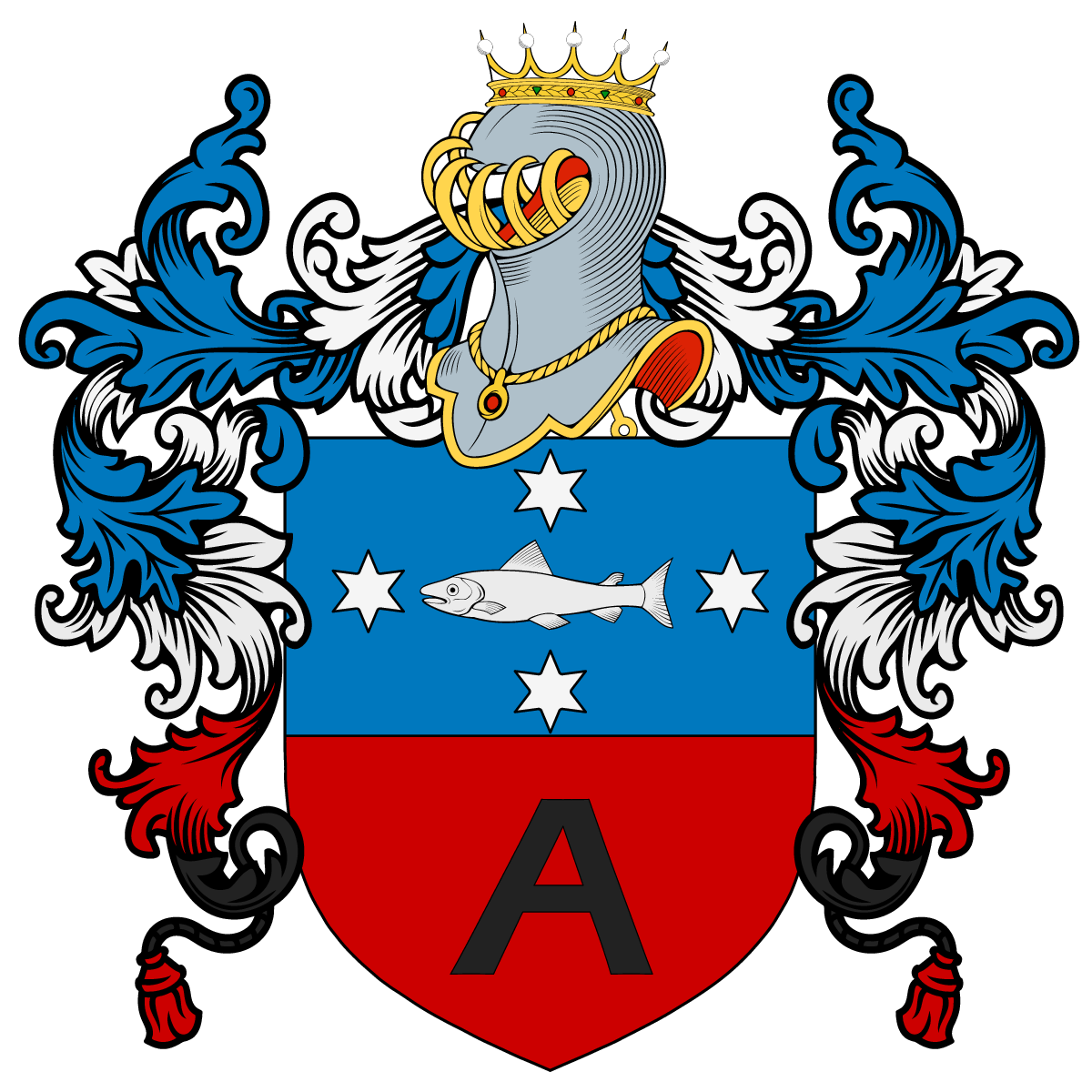
- Truncated: above, azure with a fish between 4 stars, all in silver; below, red with a tool used in the Venetian boatyards in black
- Country: Italy
- Current region: Veneto
- Origin: Republic of Venice
- Founded: 1300s
- Titles: Noble

The Nordio family is a historic Venetian house, with a significant presence in Venice and Chioggia. The family is distinguished by its involvement in public offices and its influence in both ecclesiastical and political spheres.

Some members of the Nordio family held prominent roles, such as Iacopo Nordio, who became the bishop of Urbino, dean of the chapters of Aquileia and Cividale, and secretary to Patriarch Domenico Grimani. His career took him to Rome and later to an important role in political negotiations under Popes Clement VII and Paul III.

Over the centuries, the family held various government positions in Chioggia, including that of Zonta, within the context of the reorganization of the city government in 1386. The Nordio family was also among the main signatories in the Libro d'Oro (Book of Gold) of the sworn citizens of Chioggia, established in 1574, a list that followed the Venetian model.

The Nordio family is closely connected to the historical events of the city of Chioggia, an important center of commerce and politics, especially during the period of the Republic of Venice.

== History ==
The family originates from the Treviso area. According to tradition, the surname, recorded in Chioggia since the 13th century, is of Lombard or Nordic origin, linked to the Germanic personal name "North." It is one of the four most common surnames in the lagoon city (by the end of the 19th century, there were 165 families and over 560 individuals with a myriad of nicknames and diminutives), although it is also present in Padua, Venice, Rovigo, and Comacchio.

Since the 17th century, some members of the family managed salt marshes in the Ferrara area, and they were associated with the Bosco di Fossone, which would later take the name Bosco Nordio. From there, the family likely spread to the northern part of the Polesine Delta between the Adige and Po di Levante rivers, from Loreo to Rosolina. Their first settlement in Chioggia seems to have been in the Sestiere of S. Maria, in the district still known as “Contrà Nordio.” Traces of their presence remain in other Claudian toponyms, such as “Calle Squeri Nordio” (which connects them to shipbuilding and also to a coat of arms, which in the lower part appears to depict a framework used in shipyards).

During the period of the Ezzelino wars, in the struggle between Guelphs and Ghibellines in the first half of the 13th century, the Nordio family, originally from Treviso, moved to Chioggia, along with other members of the same family, the Nordigli.

Numerous authors, including Versi, Bonifazio, Aumiro Foscariniano, Zuccato, and Federici, write about the Nordio family of Treviso. Some historians even include Iacopo among the Nordio: he was bishop of Urbino, dean of the chapters of Aquileia and Cividale, and secretary to Patriarch Domenico Grimani, with whom he lived in Rome until his death. Later, due to his experience and wisdom, he was involved in various political negotiations under Clement VII and Paul III, dying while serving as a delegate in Perugia. The Nordio family distinguished itself as one of the most influential and wealthy families in Chioggia.

In 1386, during the reorganization of the city government, they were elected to the Zonta, a role they maintained even during the Serrata of 1401. From that moment, they continued to hold the most important offices and were included in the Libro d'Oro (Book of Gold) of the sworn citizens, established in Chioggia in 1574, following the example of Venice.

== Members ==
- Carlo Nordio – Minister of Justice and former magistrate
- Roberto Nordio – General, Deputy Chief of Staff of the Ministry of Defense and former Military Representative to NATO
- Cesare Nordio – composer
- Domenico Nordio – violinist
- Furio Nordio – bobsledder who competed in the early 1960s
- Gastone Nordio – former footballer
- Tito Nordio – sailor at the 1928 Summer Olympics in Amsterdam
- Umberto Nordio – architect
- Umberto Nordio – business executive
