= Roberto Nordio =

Italian Air Force general

- Born: March 16, 1958 (age 68); Chioggia
- Military career
- Allegiance: Italy
- Branch: Italian Air Force
- Rank: Lieutenant General; Italian:Generale di Squadra Aerea
- Commands: Deputy Chief of the Defence General Staff; Deputy Commander Joint Operations

Lieutenant General Roberto Nordio is an Italian Air Force officer, currently serving as Deputy Chief of the General Staff. He is a member of the Nordio family.

Nordio served as commander of the NATO Deployable Air Command and Control Centre from 2013 to 2015 before being appointed deputy commander of the Italian Joint Operations Headquarters.

Nordio was appointed Deputy Chief of the Defence General Staff on 30 March 2016.
