= Luca Belcastro =

Italian composer of classical music (born 1964)

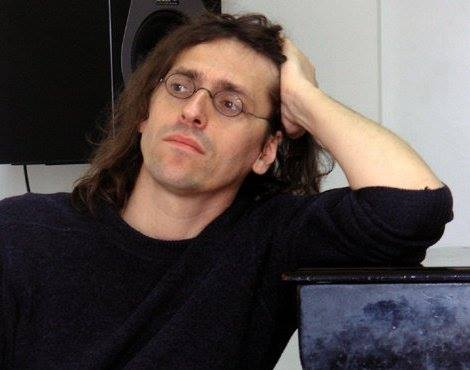
Luca Belcastro

Luca Belcastro (born 18 September 1964 in Como, Italy) is an Italian composer of classical music.

== Education ==
Belcastro graduated in Classical guitar and in Composition, with the highest grade. He attended specialization courses with Azio Corghi at the Accademia G. Petrassi in Parma and at the Accademia di Santa Cecilia in Roma, where he graduated with top marks and "Premio SIAE".

== Career ==
Belcastro's orchestral works have been awarded in important International Competitions, among those "Ciutat de Tarragona" International Award for Musical Composition (E),"Valentino Bucchi" - Roma, "2 Agosto" - Bologna, "Concours Européen du Jeune Compositeur" - Strasbourg (F), and executed by Moscow Symphony Orchestra, Orquestra Simfònica de Barcelona i Nacional de Catalunya, Orchestra of Colours - Athens, OSER Toscanini - Parma, Orchestra Sinfonica Abruzzese, Orchestra Milano-Classica. His Opera "1896 - Pheidippides... corri ancora!" has been awarded at the "Dimitris Mitropoulos - World Opera Project" - Athens 2001.

His chamber music works won the First Prize in numerous International Competitions, among those "Edvard Grieg" - Oslo (N), "Biennale Neue Musik - Hannover" (D) (performed by The Hilliard Ensemble), "Ciutat d'Alcoi" (E), "New Music for Sligo" (IRL), Sommerliche Musiktage Hitzacker (Germany, Publikum Preis), "ICOMS" - Torino. He has been selected for the "ISCM-World Music Days" - Roumania 1999 and Hong Kong 2002, "MusicaNova" and "ppianissimo" - Sofia (BUL).

His compositions have been performed in important festivals and in prestigious halls in Italy and abroad. They have been recorded and broadcast by radios and TV channels.

== Selected works ==
=== Orchestral ===
- I gatti lo sapranno - for soprano and orchestra (verses by Cesare Pavese)
- Stormi - for orchestra
- La speranza si torce - for violin, piano and orchestra

=== Chamber music ===
- La primavera escondida - for spoken voice, soprano and 6 players (poems by Pablo Neruda)
- La hora fría - for spoken voice and 11 players (poems by Federico García Lorca)

=== Vocal music ===
- La voce delle creature - for vocal quartet (text from Saint Augustine)
- Spotlight on 'The Tempest' - for vocal quartet (text from 'The Tempest' by William Shakespeare)

=== Opera ===
- 1896 - Pheidippides... run again!
- Am Suedpol, denkt man, ist es heiss
