= TROMP Percussion Eindhoven =

Music festival in the Netherlands

- Genre: Classical
- Frequency: biannually
- Venue: Muziekgebouw Eindhoven
- Locations: Eindhoven, Netherlands
- Inaugurated: 1971
- Founder: Theo Tromp
- Most recent: 9-17 November 2024
- Next event: 19-27 September 2026
- Website: tromppercussion.nl

TROMP Percussion Eindhoven is a biennial percussion competition and festival held in Eindhoven, Netherlands since 1971.

== History ==
TROMP Percussion Eindhoven is a co-production of the TROMP Biennale Foundation & Muziekgebouw Eindhoven.

The competition is organized by a foundation created in memory of its namesake Theo Tromp (1903-1984), a prominent Eindhoven businessman. He was a strong advocate of culture and donated money to the city of Eindhoven to set up an international music competition for the Benelux. Until 2010, the competition, then named TROMP International Music Competition, featured different instruments besides percussion.

Since 1971, TROMP has held 27 competitions. Prizewinners of the contest include violinist Emmy Verhey (1971), pianist Bart van de Roer (1996), percussionist Claire Edwardes (2000), the Modigliani Quartet (2004), percussionist Yi-Ping Yang (2006), the Heath Quartet (2008), percussionist Alexej Gerassimez (2010) and percussionist Alexandre Esperet (2012).

The central event of TROMP is the international percussion competition. But it also embodies a weeklong percussion Festival with concerts and productions.

Since October 2007, TROMP is a member of the World Federation of International Music Competitions.

== Amenities ==
All participants receive board & lodging with host families as well as a reimbursement of their travel costs. TROMP provides the necessary instruments. Various activities, including masterclasses, are offered to participants during the competition.

== Repertoire days ==
In preparation of the solo-percussion competition, TROMP International Percussion Competition Eindhoven organised worldwide masterclasses. Participants were given the opportunity to study and perform the repertoire for the TROMP Competition with well-known percussionists.

== The Commission ==
An important component of TROMP Percussion Eindhoven is the commissioned composition, written by a prominent composer. During previous editions, composers such as Louis Andriessen (2000), Jacob ter Veldhuis (2006), Steve Martland (2008) and Michael Torke (2010) have created the designated TROMP composition. In 2012, two composers were commissioned: Nico Muhly and Joey Roukens.

== Prize winners ==
The competition has several prize categories:

Tromp Percussion Eindhoven Prizes
Prize	Remarks
First prize	
Second prize	
Third prize	
MCN - Willem Vos prize	Best rendition of a composition by a Dutch composer
Press prize	
Friends of TROMP audience award	Audience voted favourite during final
Annelie encouragement prize	Named after Annelie Gelijns-Tromp, daughter of founder Th. Tromp
Youth jury prize	Chosen by the youth jury out of all participants

Prize TROMP Percussion Eindhoven 2010

First prize: Alexej Gerassimez

Prizes TROMP Percussion Eindhoven 2012

First Prize: Alexandre Esperet
