= Conservation in Italy =

This is a list of topics on conservation in Italy.

== Protected areas ==
- Bosco Nordio, a strict nature preserve
- List of national parks of Italy
- List of regional parks of Italy

== Conservation organisations ==
- Lega italiana protezione uccelli (LIPU) (Italian League for Bird Protection)
- Italia Nostra (Our Italy, for cultural heritage)

== See also ==
- Conservation biology
- Environment of Italy
- List of conservation issues
- List of extinct and endangered species of Italy
- List of years in the environment
