= Wassily Gerassimez =

German cellist and composer

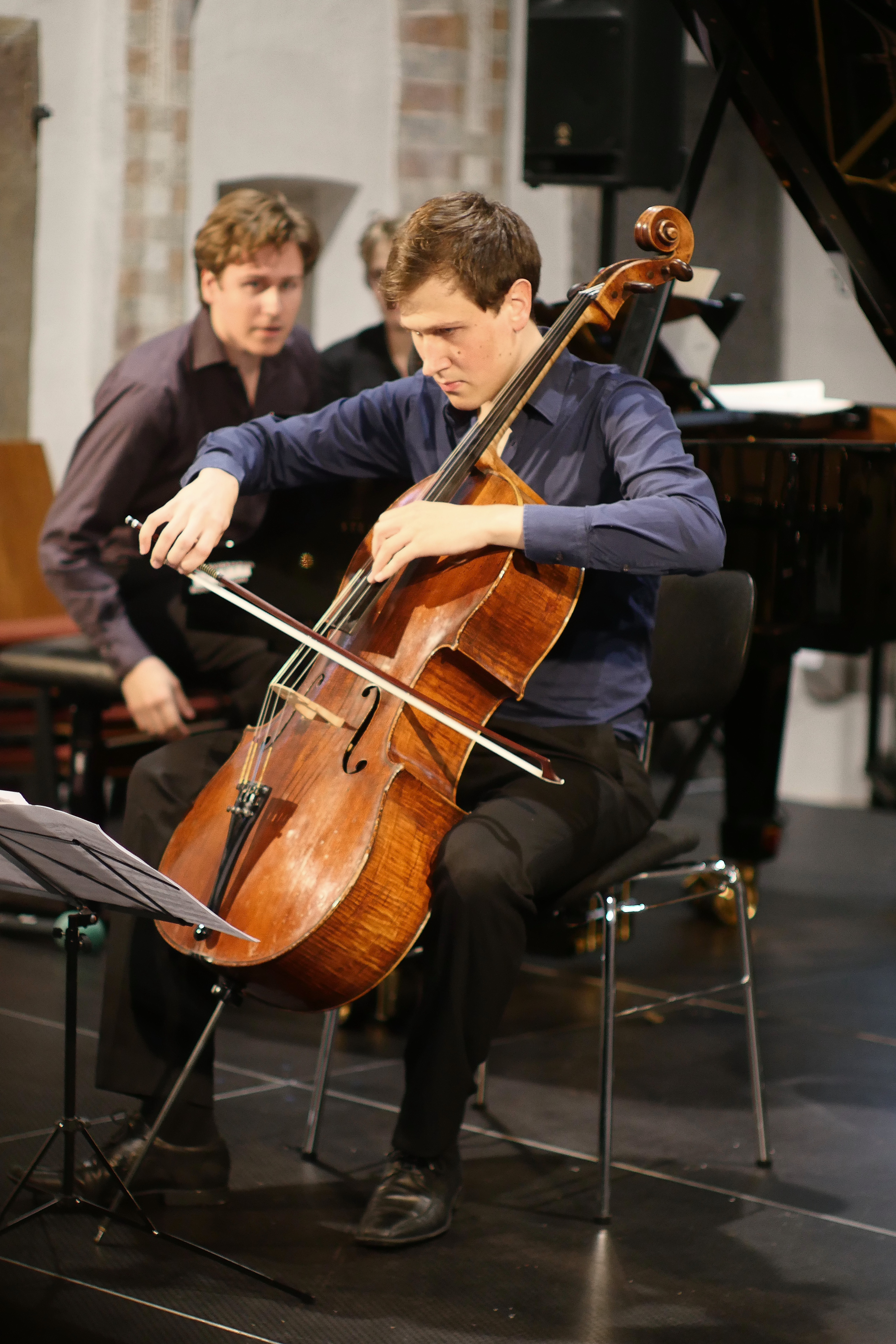
Gerassimez, 2014

Wassily Gerassimez (born 21 June 1991 in Essen) is a German cellist and composer.

His parents were born in Germany and worked, just like his brothers Nicolai and Alexej, as professional musicians.

== Life ==
Gerassimez began studying cello with Gotthard Popp at the age of eleven. Later he continued his studies with Michael Sanderling in Frankfurt and Peter Bruns in Leipzig. After earning his bachelor's degree in at the University of Music and Theatre Leipzig, he began studying jazz-cello at the Hochschule für Musik, Theater und Medien Hannover with Stephan Braun.

He plays a violoncello by Georges Chanot, made in Paris around 1840. The instrument is a loan by the Deutsche Stiftung Musikleben.

Gerassimez has performed as a soloist with the State Philharmonic Rheinland-Pfalz, the Philharmonic Munich and the Concert Orchestra Berlin. He was also a guest at the Schleswig-Holstein Musik Festival, the Festspiele Mecklenburg-Vorpommern, Münchner Symphoniker, Kozerthausorchester Berlin, Heidelberger Frühling, Gezeitenkonzerte in Ostfriesland, Bergische Symphoniker, Neubrandenburger Philharmonie and Musicfestival The Next Generation III. Regularly, he gives concerts with his brothers Nicolai (piano) and Alexej (percussion).

== Compositions ==
Gerassimez began composing his original works since his childhood. Piano being the biggest inspiration, his compositions' style vary from Bebop, over Blues and Program music. Gerassimez likes to explore different sounds and techniques on the cello as he often uses it as a jazz guitar or percussion instrument in his own works.

- Fantasia for chamber orchestra (2008)
- Transition for cello and piano (2009)
- Cello Blues for cello solo (2010)
- Zwischen den Steinen for Cello solo (2011)
- Deux Arts for Jazz-Combo (2013)
- Amira for cello and piano (2014)
- Melancholia for cello and piano (2014)
- Bilbao for 12 celli (2015)
- La Guitarra for cello solo (2015)
- Letzte Nacht im Orient for cello solo (2015)
- Momento for Percussion, piano, cello (2015)
- Sternschnuppe for piano (2017)

== Awards ==
- 2002: 1. Prize at the International Competition for Violincello in Liezen (Österreich)
- 2004: 1. Prize at Jugend musiziert for violoncello solo
- 2005: 1. Prize at the Internationalen Dotzauer Wettbewerb in Dresden
- 2006: Aalto Preis in the Aalto Theatre Essen
- 2010: 1. Prize at Jugend musiziert
- 2012: 1. Prize at Deutscher Musikwettbewerb with his brother Nicolai Gerassimez in the category Duo
