= Xavier Pagès i Corella =

Catalan-Spanish composer and conductor

Xavier Pagès i Corella (born 28 July 1971 in Sant Pere de Ribes) is a Catalan-Spanish composer and conductor.

He studied at the Conservatori Superior de Música del Liceu and the ca:Conservatori Superior Municipal de Música de Barcelona, where he graduated in piano with Margarita Serrat and Montserrat Almirall, composition with Salvador Pueyo and conducting with Albert Argudo. In 1994 he won the ca:Concurs Josep Mirabent i Magrans for young musicians, with which he studied conducting and composition with Diego Masson, László Heltay and Lou Harrison at the Dartington International Summer School. In 2000 he was admitted in the Konservatorium Wien, where he studied conducting with Reinhard Schwarz and Georg Mark.

As a composer he won the Oare String Orchestra International Music for Strings Composing Competition (United Kingdom, 2004) with the work Path of Seconds for string orchestra and the 17th Ciutat de Tarragona International Award for Musical Composition (Spain, 2010) with the work Echoes for piano and orchestra. As a conductor he has been invited to conduct orchestras such as the Orquesta Ciudad de Granada (Spain), Orquesta Sinfónica Sinaloa de las Artes (Mexico), the Orquesta Filarmónica de Mendoza (Argentina), and the Orchestre de Catalogne (France). Between 2004 and 2009 he was conductor of the ca:Cobla Sant Jordi - Ciutat de Barcelona, with which he had recorded for radio stations such as ca:Catalunya Música and the Radio Nacional de España, and labels such as Harmonia Mundi. In 2005 he was selected as assistant conductor of ca:Salvador Mas i Conde and ca:Manel Valdivieso in the ca:Jove Orquestra Nacional de Catalunya. In 2007 he records part of the soundtrack of Sa majesté Minor by Jean-Jacques Annaud, with music by the Academy Award-nominated composer, Javier Navarrete.

== Works ==
- The Donkey Barometer (2012) – Violin, Clarinet and Piano (7’)
- The Procession (2012) – Cobla and Orchestra (10’)
- H2O (2012) – Pierrot Quintet (10’)
- Contrapunctum Lucis (2012) – Organ (10’)
- The Winter Sun (2011) – Chorus, Cobla and Organ (8')
- Echoes (2010) – Solo piano and orchestra (9’)
- The Wheel of Time (2009) – Solo violoncello and orchestra (9')
- The Captive Bird (2008) – Solo flabiol and cobla (12')
- Spiritual Song (2007) – Solo baritone, choir and cobla (9')
- Brionia (sardana) (2007) – Orchestra (5')
- Ave Maria (2007) – Solo tenor and choir (9')
- Twelve Lustrum (sardana) (2006) – Cobla (4')
- Despertaferro (2005, revised in 2010) – Orchestra (9')
- Libera me (2005) – Organ (5')
- Grotesque Variations (2005) – Cobla (7')
- Despertaferro (2004) – Three coblas (9’)
- Brune at Night – Chamber opera (2004) (45')
- Path of Seconds (2003) – String orchestra (4')
- Bells Pealing (2003) – Solo soprano, choir, and chamber orchestra (4')
- At a Quarter of Moon (2003) – Solo mezzo-soprano, female choir and chamber orchestra or organ (6')
- A Peculiar Canon (2002) – Choir (1')
- Tridacna (2002) – Guitar (8')
- Path of Seconds (2001) – Choir (4')
- The Wheel of Time (2001) – Solo violoncello and cobla (9')
- Diabolic Scherzo (2000) – String orchestra (9')
- Ceraunia (sardana) (sardana, 2000) – Cobla (4')
- Elegy (1999) – Oboe and bassoon (also violin and violoncello) (2')
- From American Lands (1998) – Cobla (8')
- Prelude and Fugue (arr. 1996) – Cobla (4')
- Winter (1996) – Choir (4')
- Prelude and Fugue (1995, rev. 2010) – Woodwind quartet (4')
- Brionia (sardana) (1992) – Cobla (5')

== Bibliography ==
- David Puertas Esteve "Notes de Concert", Barcelona: Sebla Edicions, 2011, p. 214.
- Mercedes Conde Pons (January 2011). "Les veus de la música coral (I)". Revista Musical Catalana, pp. 30–31.
- Francesc Bonastre, Francesc Cortès "Història Crítica de la Música Catalana", Barcelona: Universitat Autònoma de Barcelona (Servei de Publicacions), 2009, p. 503.
- Ana María Dávila, Javier Pérez Senz "Quaderns de Nexus: Compositors d'avui", Barcelona: Caixa de Catalunya Obra Social, 2008, pp. 140–141.
- Carles Riera, Josep Maria Serracant, Josep Ventura "Diccionari d'autors de sardanes i de música per a cobla", Girona: SOM, 2002, p. 158.
