= Bosco Nordio =

Nature reserve in Veneto, Italy

- IUCN category Ia (strict nature reserve)
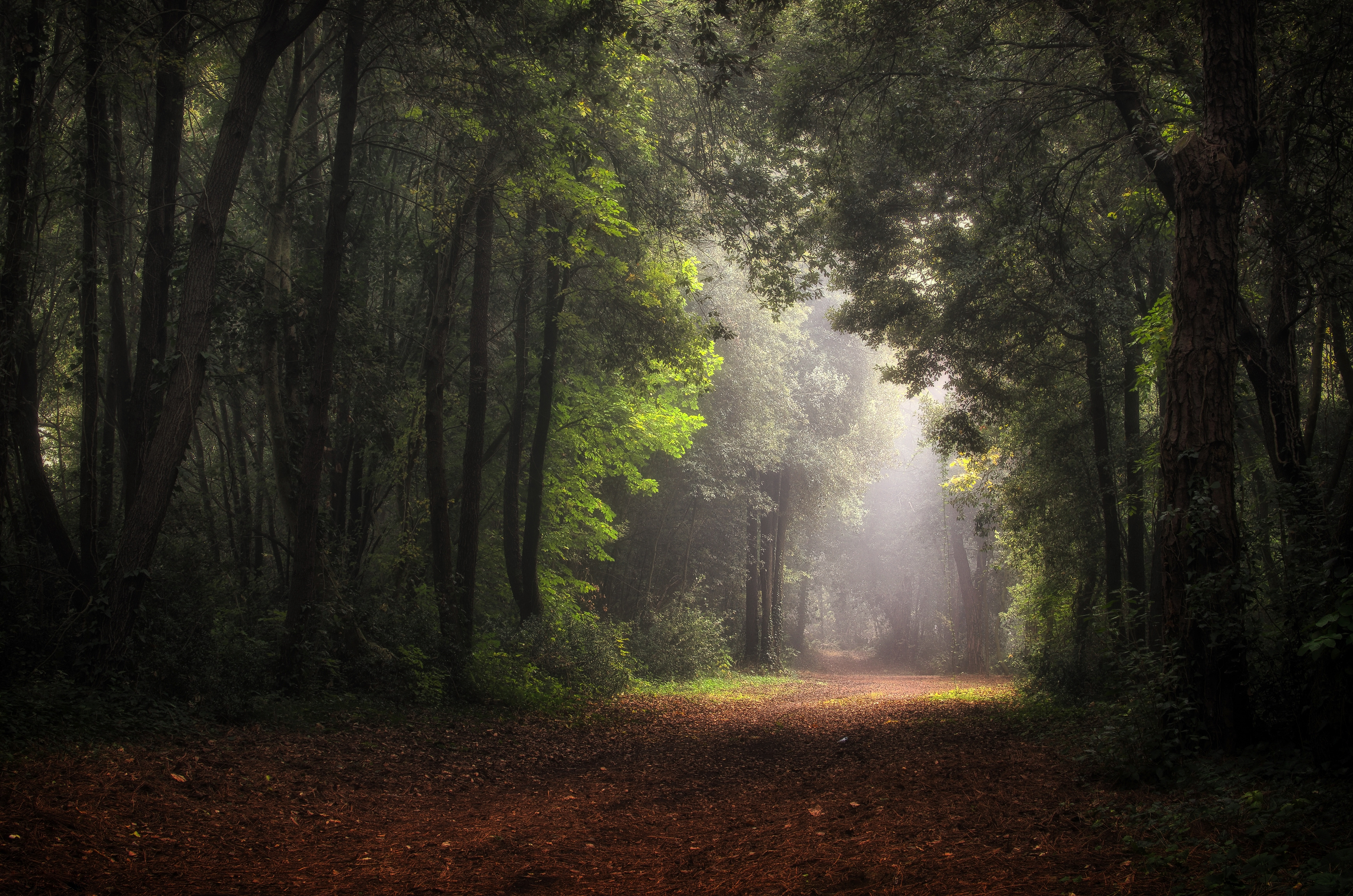

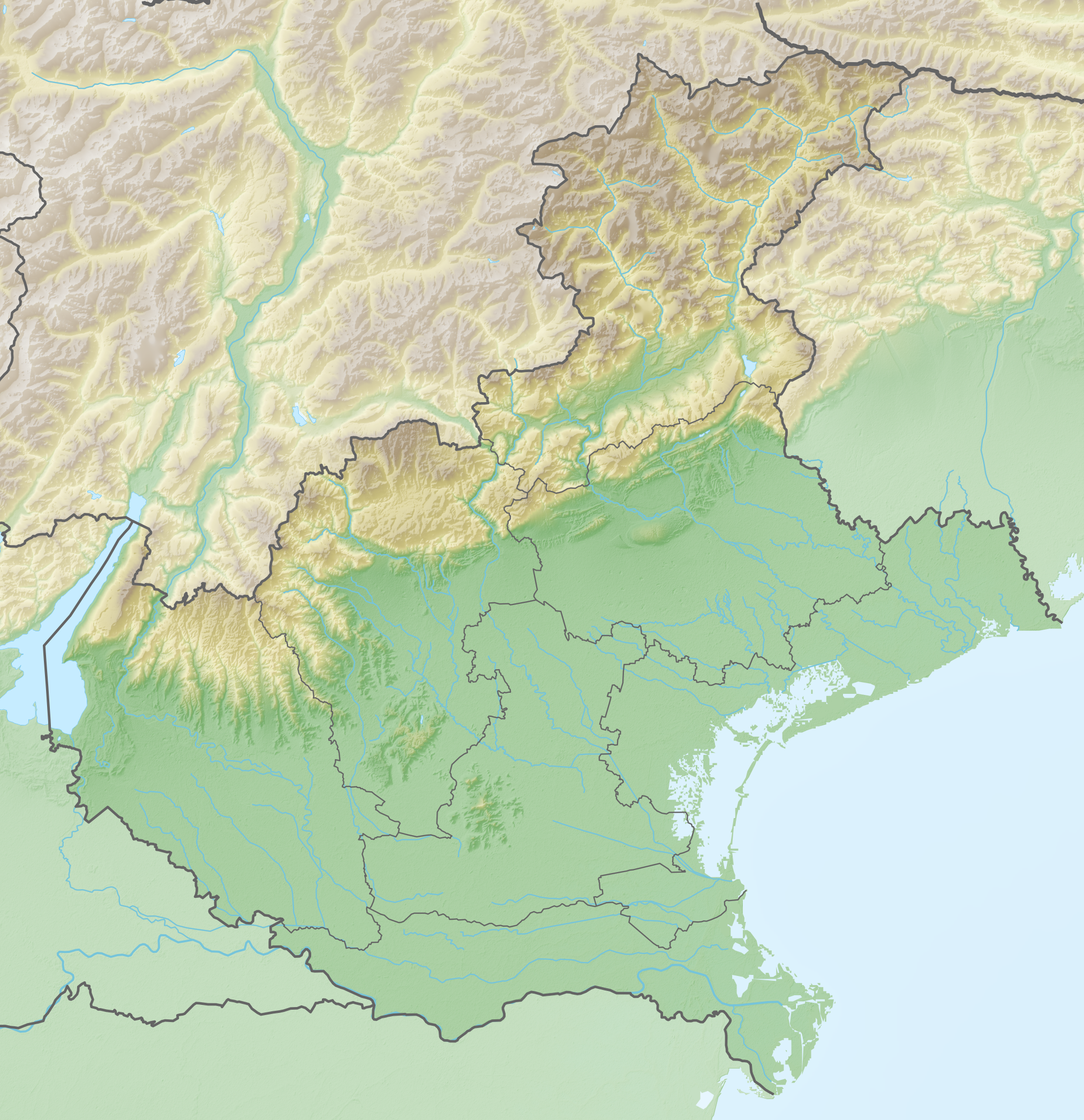
- Location within Veneto Location within Italy
- Interactive map of Bosco Nordio
- Location: Chioggia, Veneto, Italy
- Coordinates: 45.125°N 12.2625°E
- Area: 113.54 ha (280.6 acres)
- Established: July 27, 1971
- Operator: Veneto Agricoltura
- Website: Official website

Natura 2000 site (SAC/SPA)
- Official name: Bosco Nordio
- Designated: August 2003
- Reference no.: IT3250032

The Bosco Nordio strict nature reserve is a protected area located within Veneto, Italy, in the comune of Chioggia. It was established on July 27, 1971. It is designated with site ID 5967 in the World Database on Protected Areas, IT3250032 in the Natura 2000 network, and as EUAP0148 in the official list of Italian national parks (Elenco ufficiale delle aree naturali protette).

== History ==
Bosco Nordio is located on land that is a dune within the Venetian Lagoon that has built up over the last four millennia. It was constructed by deposits from the rivers Po and Adige. It originally belonged to the nearby commune of Chioggia, and had previously been known as Fosson or Cerreto. In 1565 it was given to the Nordio family and renamed sometime after. They destroyed much of the woodlands in order to be able to use it for agriculture. Around the end of the 18th century, a member of the Nordio began planting pinewood in the land, restoring some forestry. In 1959, 113 hectares of the 160 that remained were sold to the Italian government to form a nature reserve, which was formally declared in June 1971.

== Ecology ==
=== Flora ===
The most common tree species within the park are Quercus ilex, Quercus robur, and Fraxinus ornus. Others include Tilia cordata, Pinus pinaster, and Pinus pinea, which grow in the lower areas between dunes. Populus alba and Alnus glutinosa also occur in areas with more damp soil.

Understory species in the wood include hawthorn (Crataegus monogyna), privet (Ligustrum vulgare), phyllirea (Phillyrea angustifolia), and dogwood (Cornus sanguinea). Common herbaceous plants include wood asparagus (Asparagus acutifolius), fragrant clematis (Clematis flammula), butcher's broom (Ruscus aculeatus), and wild madder (Rubia peregrina). A number of climbing plants are also notable, chiefly Etruscan honeyscule (Lonicera etrusca) and European ivy (Hedera helix).

In July 2018, the holotype for a new species of mushroom, Rhodocybe fumanellii, was announced to have been discovered within the park. It was named in honor of an Italian mycologist and photographer, Ezio Fumanelli.

=== Fauna ===
In total there are twenty unique species of reptile within the park. In recent years, some more vulnerable species, such as Vipera aspis have disappeared. Notable amphibians include two frogs, Rana dalmatina and Rana latastei. There are also many varieties of birds, which often do not have opportunities to nest outside of the park area, such as Circus aeruginosus, Asio flammeus, Jynx torquilla, Luscinia luscinia, Cuculus canorus, Saxicola torquata, Serinus serinus, and Lanius collurio. Some more notable mammals within the park include deer (Dama dama, introduced in 1964), badgers (Meles meles), stone martens (Martes foina), pine martens (Martes martes), and porcupines (Hystrix cristata).

== Scientific use ==
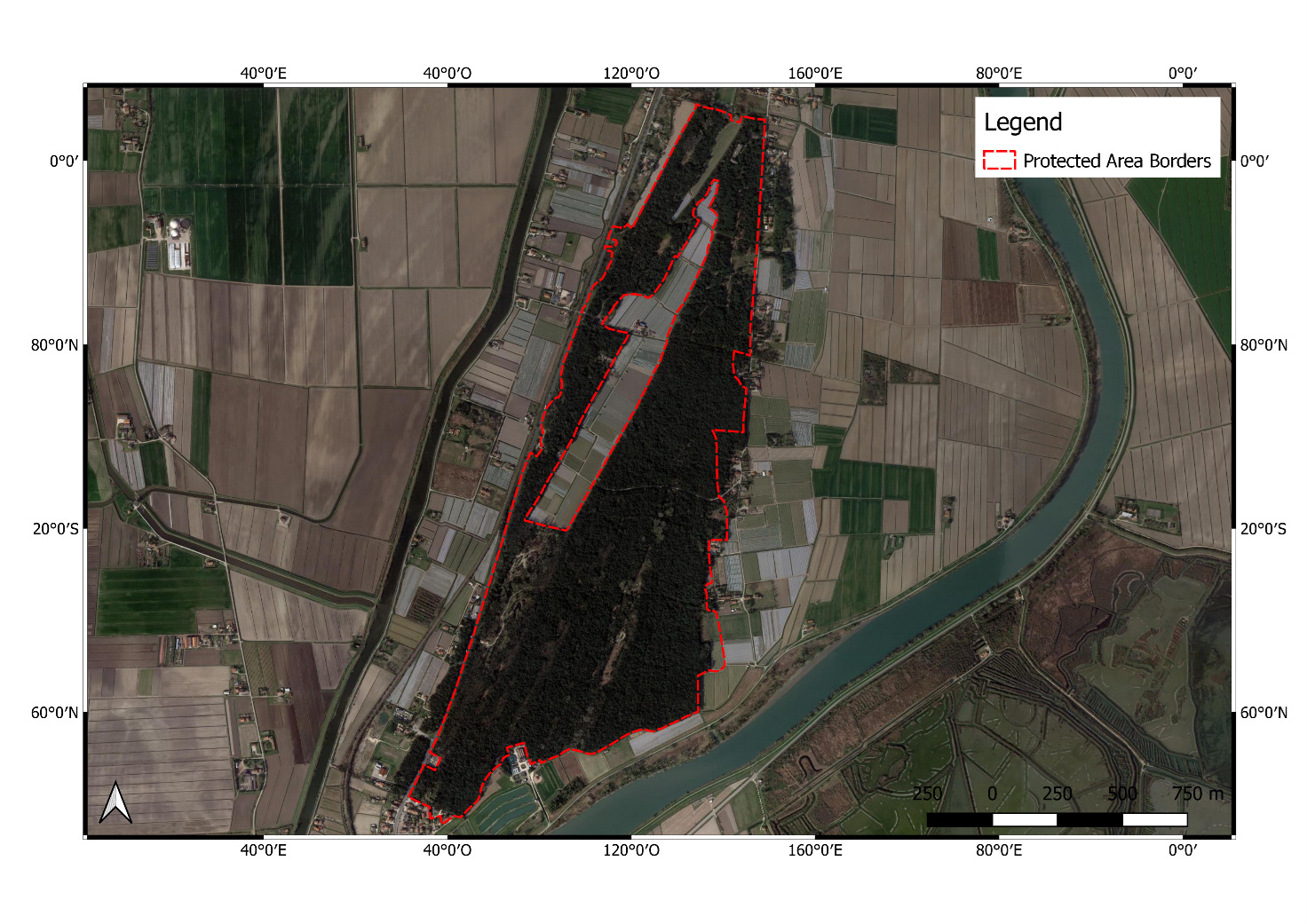
A satellite view of the protected area.

As a nature preserve, Boscio Nordio and its inhabitants have been useful for scientific interests. A 2014 study of Hermann's tortoise (Testudo hermanni), an endangered land tortoise, was examined for genetic variety, including ones present within Bosco Nordio. Haplotype diversity among one particular gene was highest among the Bosco Nordio tortoises. The reserve was also one of four sites used in an experiment to determine how longhorn beetles would respond to trapping devices that were designed with colors and patterns that visually resembled those that the beetles would use to find mates.

== Tourism ==
Bosco Nordio is only open to visitation with a tour guide booked through Veneto Agricoltura.

== See also ==
- 1971 in the environment
- Conservation in Italy
