= Spokane Symphony =

American orchestra

- Orchestra
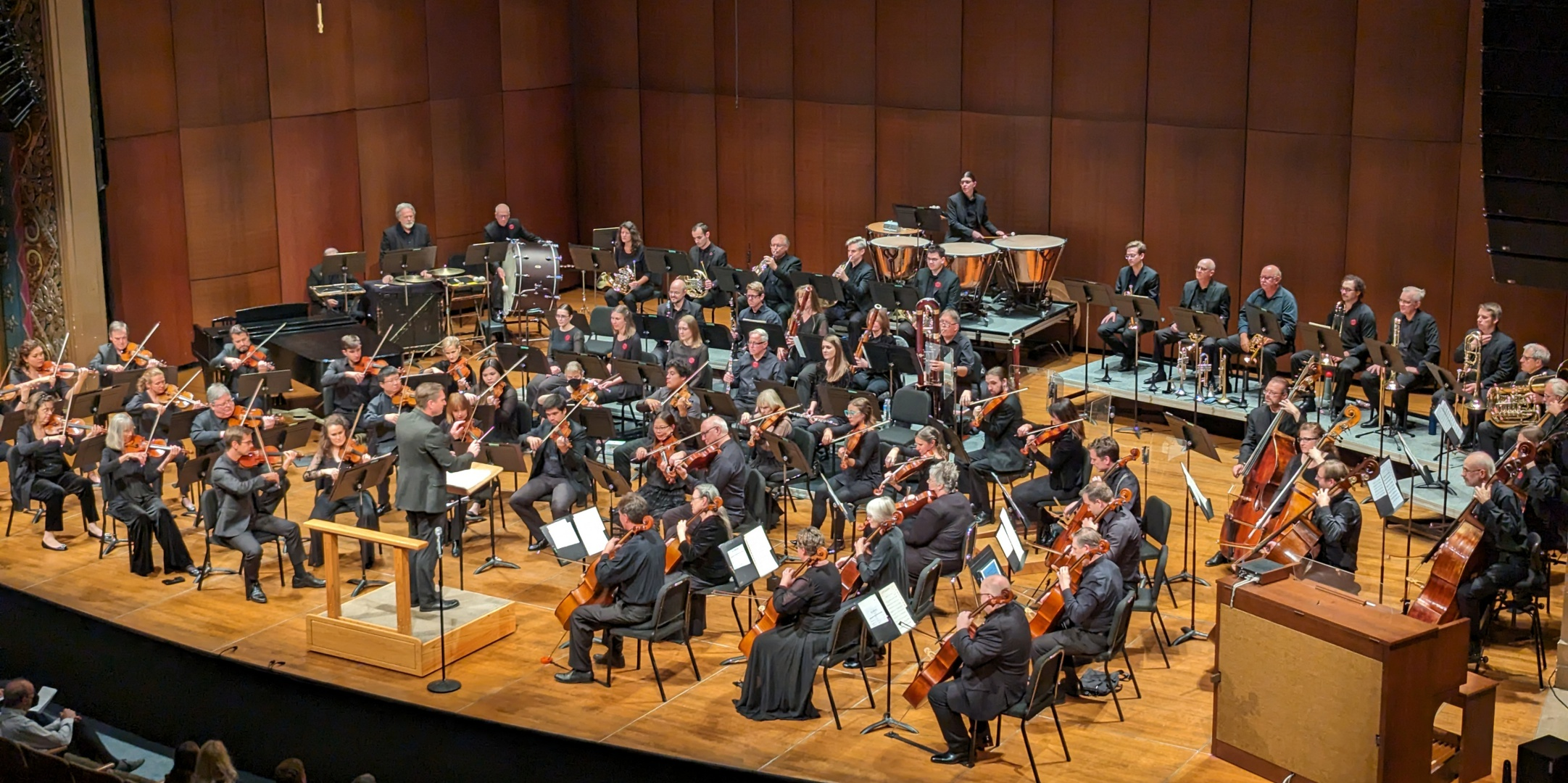
- The Symphony at the Fox Theatre, October 2023
- Founded: 1962
- Principal conductor: James Lowe
- Website: spokanesymphony.org

The Spokane Symphony is a 70-piece professional orchestra based in Spokane, Washington that performs more than 65 concerts per year for more than 150,000 listeners. It was originally incorporated in 1945 as the Spokane Philharmonic before being renamed the Spokane Symphony in 1962.

The first concert was held on December 18, 1945, at the Masonic Temple at 8:30 pm, and was conducted by Harold Paul Whelan.

The regular season includes a ten-concert Masterworks series (Saturday evenings and Sunday afternoons), six Pops performances (including two Holiday Pops performances in December) and a fully staged Nutcracker Ballet each holiday season, in addition to the new Movies & Music series which showcases the symphony playing the score live with selected popular movies.

The vast majority of its concerts are performed in the newly renovated Martin Woldson Theater at The Fox. A Chamber Soiree Series began in 2000 and moved to the Theater stage for the 2019–2020 season.

The Spokane Symphony outreach efforts provide musical experiences for more than 30,000 students and include affordable pricing for families and active duty military. Many concerts are also broadcast on 91.1 KPBX-FM. The Spokane Symphony offers Labor Day Weekend concerts at Pavilion Park in Liberty Lake (Saturday) and Comstock Park on Spokane's South Hill (Monday), with a program of classics, patriotic tunes and favorites from the worlds of pop, Hollywood and Broadway.

The symphony's current conductors are James Lowe (music director) and Morihiko Nakahara (resident conductor).

== Music directors ==
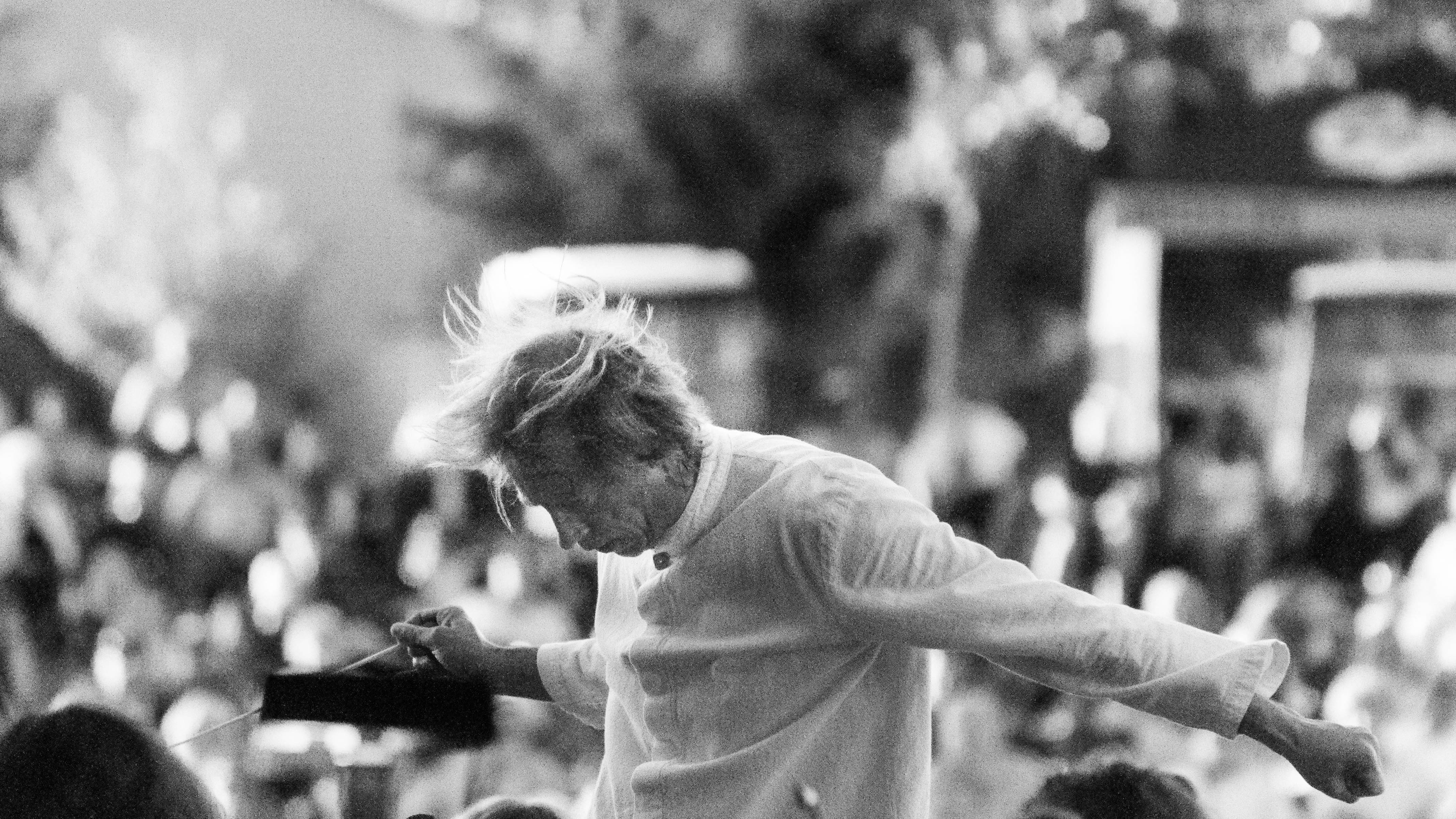
Eckart Preu performing at Pavilion Park in Liberty Lake, Washington

The musical directors of the Spokane Symphony have been:

1. Harold Paul Whelan (1945–1961)
2. Donald Thulean (1962–1984)
3. Gunther Schuller (1984–1985)
4. Bruce Ferden (1985–1991)
5. Vakhtang Jordania (1991–1993)
6. Fabio Mechetti (1993–2004, conductor laureate)
7. Eckart Preu (2004–2019)
8. James Lowe (2019–present)
