= International opera competition Lazar Jovanović =

International Opera Competition "Lazar Jovanović"
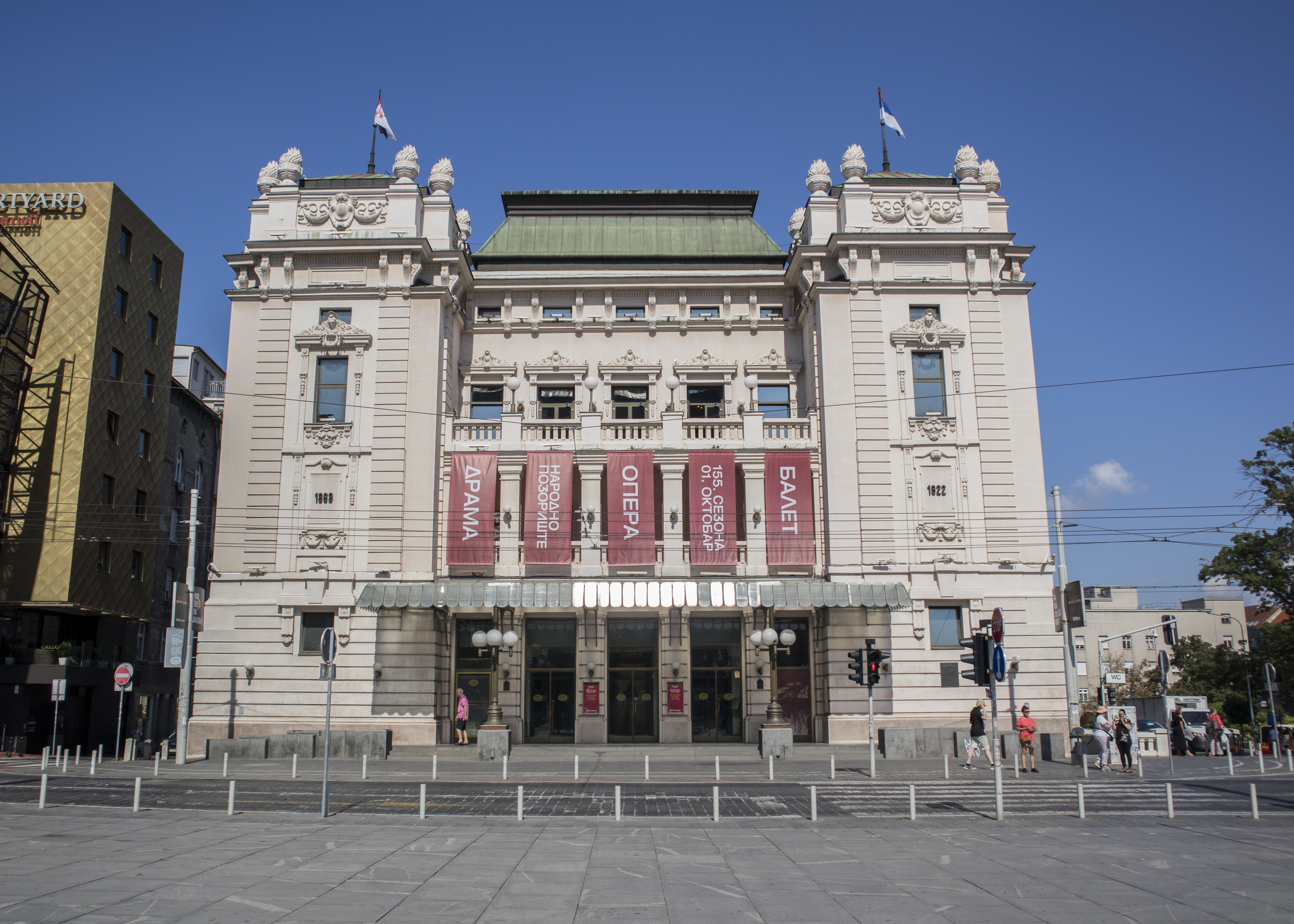
- The National Theatre in Belgrade, venue of the competition
- Native name: Међународно такмичење соло певача „Лазар Јовановић“
- Date: Annually
- Venue: National Theatre in Belgrade
- Location: Belgrade, Serbia; 44°49′01″N 20°27′38″E
- Type: Opera competition
- Theme: Classical music, solo singing
- Organised by: Kulturni Element
- Participants: 100+ singers annually from over 15 countries
- Awards: Grand Prix "Lazar Jovanović", special named prizes
- Website: takmicenjelazarjovanovic.com/en/

The International Opera Competition "Lazar Jovanović" is an annual opera competition held in Belgrade, Serbia. The competition is considered one of the largest opera events in Serbia and Southeastern Europe, attracting more than 100 participants from over 10 countries each year.The competition's main venue is the National Theatre in Belgrade, Serbia's most important opera venue. Its primary goal is to support young artists on their career path by offering them a platform to perform before an international jury.

== History ==
The competition was founded in 2004 by the "Stanković" Music Society in honor of the Yugoslav tenor Lazar Jovanović (1911–1962). Initially, it was held at the Stanković Music School. In 2016, the organization of the event was taken over by the association Kulturni Element. This change led to a number of organizational and artistic updates, including a move to a new venue, Ilija M. Kolarac Endowment hall where it was held until 2024. Kulturni element also established new prizes for the competition.

== Competition structure ==
The competition is open to solo singers of all ages and is structured into multiple categories based on age and level of education, from younger students to professionals. There are also categories for chamber music. The repertoire requirements are varied and often require participants to prepare works from different musical periods and genres.The jury consists of international artists, pedagogues, and directors of opera houses.

== Awards ==
The main prize is the "Lazar Jovanović" Grand Prix, which gives the winner the opportunity to perform a solo concert with an orchestra in some of the most important musical venues in the country.The competition also features special prizes named after notable figures from the Serbian opera scene, such as Jadranka Jovanović and Željko Lučić. Other awards have included professional studio recordings, concert engagements, and the "Operabase Award," which includes creating a professional profile on the leading global opera database.

== See also ==
- Kulturni element
- National Theatre in Belgrade
- List of classical music competitions
