= Alexej Gerassimez =

German percussionist and composer (born 1987)

Alexej Gerassimez (born 1987 in Essen) is a German solo percussion player and composer.

Gerassimez was born in Essen, Germany. His brothers are also musicians: Nicolai Gerassimez is a pianist and Wassily Gerassimez is a cellist. He studied at the Cologne Conservatory of Music, the Berlin Conservatory and the Munich Conservatory of Music.

In 2010 he won the TROMP Percussion Competition for solo percussion as well as the Audience Award and the Press Prize. In 2015 he took up a tutoring position at the Royal Birmingham Conservatoire in England.

He has performed with orchestras in Europe including the Radio Symphony Orchestra Berlin, the Beethoven Orchestra Bonn and the Bochum Philharmonic, as well as internationally in Japan, in the US with the Arkansas Symphony Orchestra, and in New Zealand.

In 2022 he performed the New Zealand premiere performance of New Zealand composer John Psathas's work Leviathan for orchestra and solo percussion. The work takes its inspiration from Beethoven's Pastoral Symphony and was commissioned in 2020 by the Tonhalle Düsseldorf and dedicated to Gerassimez. The premiere performance took place in 2021 with the Berlin Radio Symphony under Markus Poschner.

Gerassimez has made numerous recordings and CDs and is also a composer.
