= Corinna Niemeyer =

German conductor (born 1986)

Corinna Niemeyer (born 1986) is a German conductor.

== Life ==
Corinna Niemeyer is a graduate of the University of Music and Theatre Munich, where she studied cello, choral and orchestral conducting, music education, and musicology. She earned a bachelor's degree in conducting from the Hochschule für Musik Karlsruhe. She also completed a semester of cello studies at the Shanghai Conservatory of Music. She concluded her conducting training with a master's degree from the Zurich University of the Arts.

During her studies in Karlsruhe, Niemeyer became the artistic director of the Orchestre universitaire de Strasbourg (OUS) in 2010. She led the orchestra until 2022; her final concert took place on 10 September 2022, as part of the celebrations marking the OUS's 60th anniversary.

She participated in masterclasses with Bernard Haitink (including at the Lucerne Festival), Esa-Pekka Salonen, and David Zinman. At the "Kritisches Orchester" masterclass in Berlin, she learned from principal players of the Staatskapelle Berlin, the Berlin Philharmonic, and the NDR orchestras.

From 2016 to 2018, she served as a lecturer and chief conductor at Sorbonne University in Paris. As assistant conductor of the Rotterdam Philharmonic Orchestra (2018–2020), she assisted Lahav Shani and Yannick Nézet-Séguin. From 2020 to 2024, she was the artistic director and chief conductor of the Orchestre de Chambre du Luxembourg.

Her conducting work encompasses early music ensembles, premieres of contemporary works, interdisciplinary projects, operas, and symphonic concerts. In the 2022/23 season, she made her debut with the Royal Liverpool Philharmonic Orchestra, the Hallé Orchestra, the Saarland State Orchestra, and at the Royal Opera House conducting the Aurora Orchestra in The Rape of Lucretia. In the 2023/24 season, she conducted symphonic concerts with the Orchestre national d'Île-de-France and the Heidelberg Philharmonic, as well as the operas Cendrillon (Opéra de Lausanne) and The Fairy-Queen (Theater St. Gallen).

In January 2025, she conducted the 5th symphony concert at Theater Magdeburg.

She has also performed concerts with the Orchestre de Paris, the Danish National Symphony Orchestra, the BBC Philharmonic Orchestra, the MDR Symphony Orchestra, the Kammerakademie Potsdam, the Beethoven Orchester Bonn, and the Orquesta Sinfónica de Castilla y León. She regularly conducts Les Siècles, Ensemble Modern, and the children's orchestra (DEMOS) at the Philharmonie de Paris.

== Prizes and Awards ==
2014: "Talent Chef d'orchestre" from the French collecting society ADAMI in Paris 2014: Scholarship from the Richard Wagner Foundation Bayreuth 2015: Emerging artist scholarship in conducting from the Orchestral Academy of the Bergische Symphoniker 2015: Third prize at the Tokyo International Music Competition for Conducting 2018: Franco-German Friendship Prize
