= Stenzl Piano Duo =

German piano duo

The Stenzl Piano Duo is a German classical piano duo consisting of brothers Hans-Peter Stenzl (born 1960) and Volker Stenzl (born 1964). Following their prize-winning success at the 1986 ARD International Music Competition in Munich, they established an international reputation as one of Europe's prominent two-piano ensembles. The Stenzls have appeared in almost all countries of Europe, and also in West Africa, North America, South America, Japan, China, and Hong Kong.

In September 1999, they had their debut in the Suntory Hall in Tokyo. In addition to performing, both brothers serve as regular jurors at national and international music competitions.

== Early life and education ==
Brothers Hans-Peter and Volker Stenzl grew up in Schwäbisch Gmünd, Germany, where they began their musical education at the local music school. Hans-Peter was 12 years old when a teacher recognized his musical talent; to justify the expense of purchasing a family piano, his younger brother Volker was enrolled in lessons alongside him simultaneously. In their youth, Hans-Peter also studied the violin while Volker trained on the clarinet, allowing both brothers to play in their school orchestra.

They pursued their formal piano training under Renate Werner at the State University of Music and Performing Arts Stuttgart, where they increasingly focused on four-hand performance. In 1985, they won first prize at the Brahms Competition in Hamburg.

In 1988, following their graduation from the Stuttgart and Frankfurt music conservatories, the duo completed a two-year postgraduate course at the Royal Academy of Music in London under Frank Wibaut, Hamish Milne, and Stephen Kovacevich, supplemented by private lessons from Alfred Brendel.

== Career and masterclasses ==
Since their success at the ARD International Music Competition, the duo has expanded their international profile through performance and pedagogy. In 1989, they won second prize at the second biennial Dranoff International Two Piano Competition in Miami, Florida. They were frequent featured guest artists and masterclass mentors at major European music festivals, including the Reding–Piette festivals organised by pioneering Belgian pianist Janine Reding.
