= James Lowe (conductor) =

British orchestra conductor and music director

James Lowe is an orchestra conductor and current music director of the Spokane Symphony in Spokane, WA, beginning in the 2019–2020 season. He assumed his role of Chief Conductor of the Prussian Chamber Orchestra for the 2015/16 season. His work as artistic director of the Hallé Harmony Youth Orchestra was featured in a four-part documentary shown in the UK on Channel 4 in 2010. A recipient of the Bernard Haitink Fund for Young Talent, Lowe is principal conductor of the Edinburgh Contemporary Music Ensemble, Principal Guest Conductor of Music for Everyone, Orchestras Advisor and conductor of the Senior Orchestra of the National Youth Orchestra of Scotland and held the position of associate conductor of the Royal Scottish National Orchestra. Lowe is also artistic advisor of the Nottingham Youth Orchestra, with whom he began his orchestral career.

== Early life ==
Lowe was born in Nottingham. His first venture into the world of music was the study of the viola. He began viola lessons aged 13 and later went on to study the instrument privately with John White. He then studied music at the University of Edinburgh gaining a First Class Honours degree in music.

Lowe's first conducting experience was with the Nottingham Youth Orchestra, with whom he conducted Shostakovich's Symphony No 5 in D minor. Having conducted most of the main ensembles at the University of Edinburgh during his time as a student there Lowe continued his study of conducting in a series of master classes with legendary Finnish conducting teacher Jorma Panula and continued studies with Bernard Haitink, Neeme Järvi and Valery Gergiev.

== Career ==
Educated at the University of Edinburgh, Lowe continued his development as Benjamin Zander Conducting Fellow with the Boston Philharmonic, and has studied with leading conductors in master classes, including Jorma Panula, Neeme Järvi, Bernard Haitink and with Valery Gergiev and the London Symphony Orchestra. He has worked as Assistant Conductor to Haitink in performances with the Concertgebouw Orchestra in Amsterdam.

One of two prizewinners in the Tokyo International Music Competition for Conducting and special prize winner in the Jorma Panula International Competition, he has appeared in performance with the Osaka and Tokyo Philharmonic Orchestras, the Trondheim Symphony Orchestra, the Moscow Chamber Orchestra, the St. Petersburg Academic Symphony Orchestra, the New Japan Philharmonic, the Indianapolis Symphony Orchestra, the Hallé Orchestra, the BBC Philharmonic, Scottish Ballet, the orchestra of Welsh National Opera, the Royal Liverpool Philharmonic and the Scottish Chamber Orchestra, and the Edinburgh Contemporary Music Ensemble as well as working with numerous other ensembles in many European countries, South Africa and the USA.

In June 2019, Lowe was announced as Music Director for the Spokane Symphony from a pool of five candidates who conducted the orchestra for a "Classics" concert during the 2018-2019 season. He began full-time direction for the orchestra’s 2019-2020 season.

Lowe is also active as a teacher of conducting and is undertaking research exploring ways in which orchestras can meaningfully engage with a greater public.
