= Varshavski-Shapiro Piano Duo =

Israeli-American piano duo

Stanislava Varshavski and Diana Shapiro
- Origin: Israel, United States
- Genres: Classical music
- Occupations: Pianists; professors
- Instrument: Piano four hands
- Years active: 1998–present
- Website: www.piano-4-hands.com

Stanislava Varshavski and Diana Shapiro is a piano duo, formed in Israel and residing in the United States.

Stanislava Varshavski was born in Kharkiv, Ukraine. A young piano prodigy, she had her orchestral debut at the age of eight. After receiving her initial musical training in Ukraine, Stanislava proceeded with her studies at the Jerusalem Rubin Academy in Israel.

Diana Shapiro was born in Moscow, Russia. At the age of 17 she moved to Israel and started her studies at the Jerusalem Rubin Academy under Berkovich.

In 1998, at one of their classes in the Academy, Stanislava and Diana were encouraged by Alexander Tamir to try playing as a piano duo. The collaboration turned to be a real success and within a year the duo captured their first top prize at the International Piano Duo Competition in Bialystok, Poland.

Both Ms. Varshavski and Ms. Shapiro received Bachelor and master's degrees from the Jerusalem Academy of Music and Dance, where they studied with the Israeli duo Bracha Eden and Alexander Tamir, and in 2005 moved to Boston, MA to continue their education under renowned American pianist Victor Rosenbaum. In 2011 both pianists completed Doctoral degree studies at the University of Wisconsin-Madison. During their studies at UW-Madison both artists served on the faculty of the Maranatha University and upon completion joined the faculty of the Silver Lake College in Manitowoc, WI.

The Varshavski-Shapiro Piano Duo has performed in such venues as the HKAPA Concert Hall in Hong Kong, Henry Crown Symphony Hall in Jerusalem, Teatro Valle in Rome, and Lincoln Theater in Miami. They have appeared with the Radio Orchestra in Munich, the Israel Chamber Orchestra, Jerusalem Symphony Orchestra, Warsaw Philharmonic Orchestra, Miami's New World Symphony, and Wichita Falls Symphony Orchestra, and have recorded for Bavarian Radio, Radio 4 of Hong Kong, New York's WQXR, Israeli National Radio, and Wisconsin Public Radio. In 2012 the duo has been featured in a documentary film presented on the Wisconsin Public Television.

As music educators, Diana Shapiro and Stanislava Varshavski have presented master classes at a number of universities across the United States and gave lectures at WMTA, ISMTA and College Music Society conferences. In 2016, Varshavski and Shapiro have been invited to showcase at the 2016 National Conference of the Chamber Music America and served as judges at the 2016 Chicago International Competition for Piano Duos.

== Awards ==
- 2012 – Winner of National Auditions of the Astral Artists in Philadelphia, PA
- 2008 – Career Grant from "Salon De Virtuosi" in New York, NY
- 2005 – Second Prize at the Murray Dranoff International Two Piano Competition in Miami, Florida
- 2004 – The Grand Prize at the 15th International Piano Competition "Rome 2004" (two pianos section) in Rome, Italy
- 2004 – First Prize at the 15th International Piano Competition "Rome 2004" (one piano four hands section) in Rome, Italy
- 2004 – First Prize at the "Kol HaMusica" Young Artists Competition in Jerusalem, Israel
- 2003 – First Prize at the 13th Schubert Competition in Jesenik, Czech Republic
- 2003 – First Prize at the Israel Chamber Music competition in Jerusalem, Israel, 2003
- 2000 – Top 5 at the ARD Competition in Munich, Germany
- 1999 – First Prize (and two special prizes) at the International Piano Duo Competition in Bialystok, Poland
