= Città di Brescia International Violin Competition =

Violin competition in Italy

The Città di Brescia International Violin Competition (Concorso Internazionale di Violino "Città di Brescia") is one of the most prestigious Prize for classical music players. The Competition is organized in Brescia, Italy, by the Romano Romanini Foundation, in order to honour the memory of the violinist Romano Romanini (1864–1934). The seats of the “Città di Brescia” Competition are at the "Auditorium S.Barnaba" for the eliminatory and semi finals tests and at the "Teatro Grande" for the final tests. The Competition is member of the WFIMC, Geneva, since 2005. Mario Conter was the founder, actually Domenico Nordio is the Artistic Director. The Competition is triennial. The XIIIth edition will be held October, 2013.

== Past winners ==
The violinists who have obtained the acknowledgement are Dora Schwartzberg, US, winner of the first edition in 1979, Luca Fanfoni, Italy (1988), Silvia Simionescu, Romania (1990) Gabriele Pieranunzi, Italy (1993), Anton Sokorow, Russia (1999), Alexis Nagovitsyn, Russia (2001) (who died a few days after his performance in Brescia) and Yusuke Hayashi, Japan (2010).

== Past jurors ==
The Città di Brescia International Violin Competition has always kept in consideration the need of inviting prominent personalities in the international scenario from the world of music as members of the jury, so as to ensure that they reach the most objective decisions possible. During the eleven editions held so far, in the years 1979, 1981, 1984, 1986, 1988, 1990, 1993, 1999, 2001, 2004, 2007 and 2010 the Price has been awarded by members of the jury such as Marcello Abbado, Salvatore Accardo, Paolo Borciani, Zakhar Bron, Duilio Courir, Maxim Fedotov, Franco Ferrara, Franco Fisch, Stefan Gheorghiu, Iljia Grubert, Silvia Marcovici, Mihaela Martin, Elisa Pegreffi, Leonardo Pinzauti, Corrado Romano, Cristiano Rossi, Max Rostal, Dora Schwartzberg, Kyoko Takezawa, Tibor Varga, Pavel Vernikov, Krzystof Wegrzyn, Mario Zafred and Grigory Zistlin.
