= Michelle LaCourse =

Violist and educator

Michelle LaCourse is a viola player and string department chair on the faculty of the Boston University College of Fine Arts.

== Performances ==
As a soloist and chamber musician, LaCourse has performed throughout the United States and Europe and in South America, including recent performances in Italy, Spain, and Brazil. LaCourse was formerly a member of the Lehigh Quartet, the Delphic String Trio and the Aeolian Trio. As an orchestral musician, she has performed with the Baltimore Symphony, and was formerly principal violist of the Chamber Orchestra of Grenoble France and of the Concerto Soloists Chamber Orchestra of Philadelphia. LaCourse has commissioned a body of work for both solo viola as well as viola and piano from composer James Grant. Her recording of these works, "Chocolates: Music for Viola and Piano by James Grant" was released by MSR Classics (MS1335).
