= Ramón Humet =

Spanish composer (born 1968)

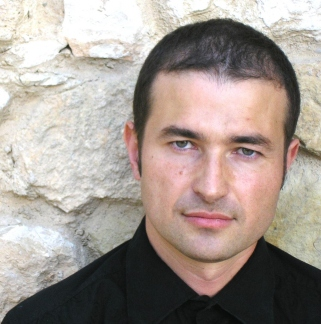
Ramon Humet

Ramón Humet is a Spanish composer born in Barcelona in 1968. In 2006 he was awarded the Queen Sofía Prize for Escenas de pájaros, which also won the Montreal Symphony Prize the following year, and in 2008 he won the Ciutat de Tarragona Award for Gagaku. His music, influenced by nature and zen, has been described as "atemporal, luminous, colorful, very meditative and organic" by Pablo González, and as "delicate and subtle, with high poetic imagination" by Johathan Harvey.

== Compositions ==
=== Opera ===
- Sky Disc (2012)

=== Orchestral ===
- El temps i la campana (The time and the bell, 2014-2015)
- Escenas de pájaros (2006)
- Gagaku (2008)
- Escenas de viento (2008)
- Música del no esser (2010)

=== Concertante ===
- 3 Nocturnes for saxophone and orchestra (2001)
- And the World Was Calm, for piano and ensemble (2009)

=== Ensemble ===
- From the Meadows (2006)
- Jardí de haikus (2007)

=== Chamber music ===
- Mantra 2 (2002)
- Quatre jardins zen (2008)
- El jardí de Kinko (2008)
- Pètals (2009)
- Petites catàstrofes (2010)

=== Solo ===
- Escenes del bosc, for piano (2005–08)
- Meditació, for marimba (2007)
- Vent de l'Oest, for shakuhachi (2007)

=== Vocal ===
- Homenaje a Martha Ghaham (2011)

=== Choral ===
- Salve Montserratina (2011)
- Tres Ofertoris (2012)

=== Cobla ===
- El Montsant (2004)
