= Tokyo International Music Competition for Conducting =

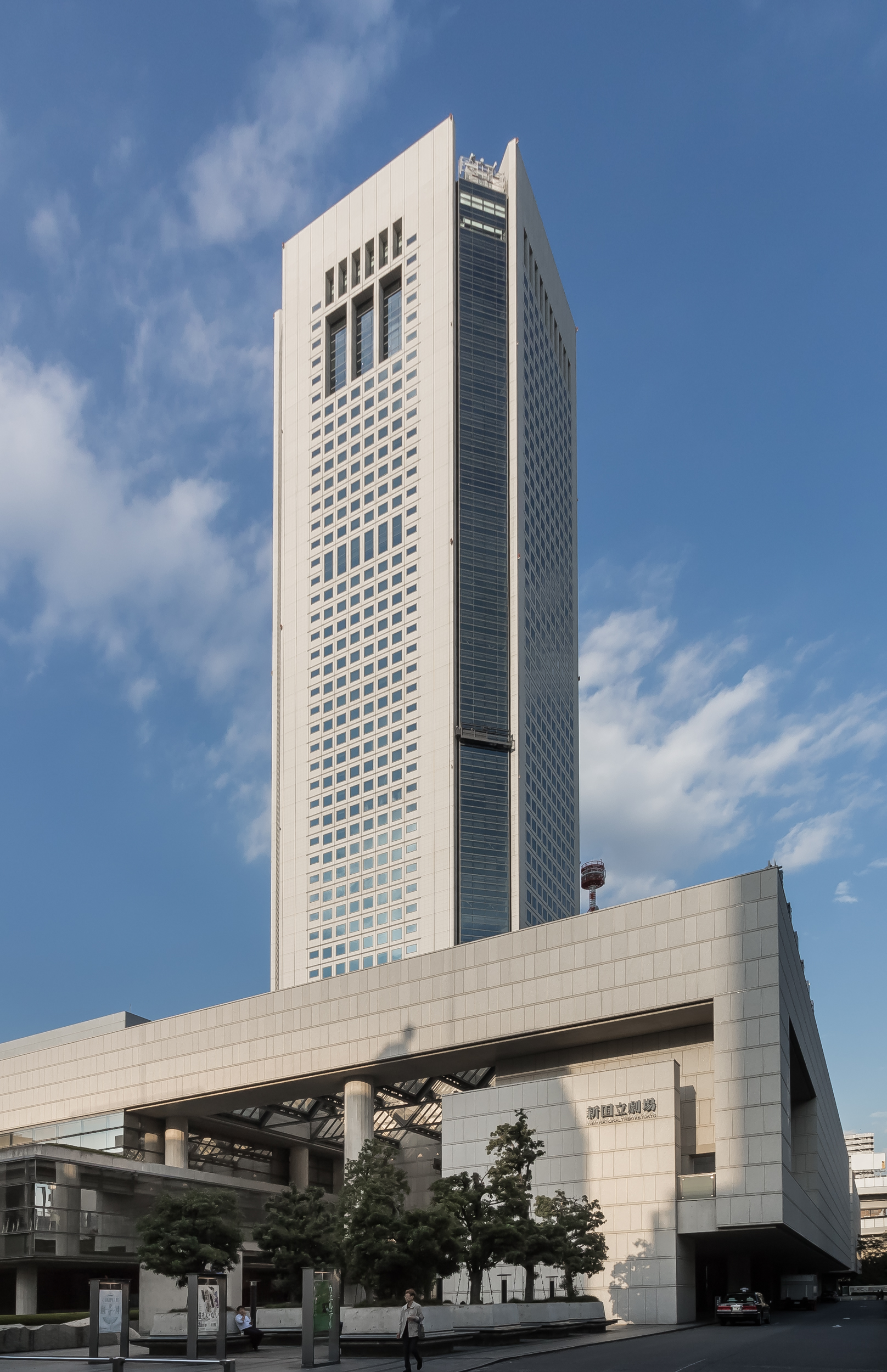
Tokyo Opera City Tower (Shinjuku Ward, Tokyo)

The Tokyo International Music Competition is a music competition held in Tokyo, Japan. It has been organized by Min-On Concert Association. Competitions have been held in the three areas of conducting, singing, and chamber music, and competitions in conducting are currently being held on a triennial basis. The Tokyo International Music Competition for Conducting has become an official member of the World Federation of International Music Competitions in 2014.

== Overview ==
Established in 1966 with the aim of discovering and supporting outstanding musical talents, the Tokyo International Music Competition vigorously promotes the growth of young musicians who display a broad range of promise in an international forum. It also serves to promote cultural exchanges between representatives of different countries and to contribute to the further development of musical culture. The first competition for singing was held in 1966, followed by the first competition for conducting in 1967. The competition for chamber music was established in 1974. The Tokyo International Music Competition for Conducting has been renamed in 1988 from Min-On Competition.

== Prize winners of Past Conductors Competitions ==
(Source for 1st-19th competition winners:)

1st Competition in 1967

1st Prize: Yukinori Tezuka, Japan

2nd Prize: Shigenobu Yamaoka, Japan

3rd Prize: Hiroshi Koizumi, Japan

Finalists: Kotaro Sato, Japan; Yasuhiko Shiozawa, Japan

2nd Competition in 1970

1st Prize: Kazuhiro Koizumi, Japan

2nd Prize: Tadaaki Otaka, Japan

3rd Prize: Jacques Brourman, USA

Finalists: Kenichiro Kobayashi, Japan; Michiyoshi Inoue, Japan; Yasuhiko Shiozawa, Japan; David Howell, United Kingdom

3rd Competition in 1973

1st Prize: No recipient

2nd Prize (shared): Akinari Iguchi, Japan; Yasuhiko Shiozawa, Japan; David Howell, United Kingdom

3rd Prize: No recipient

Finalists: Makoto Kokubu, Japan; Ryo Kushimoto, Japan; Yoshinori Kawachi, Japan

4th Competition in 1976

1st Prize: Alan Balter, USA

2nd Prize: Jerome Kaltenbach, France

3rd Prize: Makoto Kokubu, Japan

Finalists: Kazuyoshi Tanaka, Japan; Kiyoto Takagi, Japan

5th Competition in 1979

1st Prize: Yoshikazu Tanaka, Japan

2nd Prize: Kim Hong Jae, North Korea

3rd Prize: Satomi Kurita, Japan

Finalists: Kiyomasa Nagase, Japan; Jean Paul Penin, France

6th Competition in 1982

1st Prize: Naohiro Totsuka, Japan

2nd Prize: Kazushi Ono, Japan

3rd Prize: Hiroyuki Odano, Japan

Finalists: Kazufumi Yamashita, Japan; Junichi Hirokami, Japan

7th Competition in 1985

1st Prize: No recipient

2nd Prize (shared): Norichika Iimori, Japan; Tetsuji Honna, Japan

3rd Prize: Pascal Verrot, France

Finalists: Richard Westerfield, USA; Nikolay Alexeev, Russia; Evgeny Samoilov, Russia

8th Competition in 1988

1st Prize: Hirofumi Kurita, Japan

2nd Prize: Alexandre Titov, Russia

3rd Prize: Carlo Rizzi, Italy

Finalists: Yip Wing Sie, China; Nikolai Diadura, Russia

9th Competition in 1991

1st Prize: Olivier Grangean, France

2nd Prize (shared): Yuri Nitta, Japan; Daniel Kleiner, Switzerland

3rd Prize: No recipient

Finalists: Akira Mori, Japan; Rupert D'Cruze, United Kingdom

10th Competition in 1994

1st Prize: Francisco de Galve, Spain

2nd Prize: Dorian Wilson, USA

3rd Prize: Koji Kawamoto, Japan

Finalists: Satoshi Uegaki, Japan; Masahiro Ueno, Japan; Ya-Hui Wang, Singapore

11th Competition in 1997

1st Prize: No recipient

2nd Prize (shared): Marco Parisotto, Canada; Yun-Sung Chang, South Korea

3rd Prize: Ronen Borshevsky, Israel

Finalists: Mark Allen McCoy, USA; Dorian Wilson, USA; Ligia Amadio, Brazil

12th Competition in 2000

1st Prize: Tatsuya Shimono, Japan

2nd Prize: Toshio Yanagisawa, Japan

3rd Prize: No recipient

Finalists: Christine E. Myers, USA; George Tchitchinadze, Georgia

13th Competition in 2003

1st Prize: No recipient

2nd Prize: Alexander Mayer, Germany

3rd Prize: James Lowe, United Kingdom

Finalists: Keigo Okuda, Japan; Helene Bouchez, France

14th Competition in 2006

1st Prize: No recipient

2nd Prize: Kentaro Kawase, Japan

3rd Prize: No recipient

Finalists: Shizuo Z Kuwahara, USA; Natalia Oleynik, Russia; Jeong In Hyeok, South Korea

15th Competition in 2009

1st Prize: No recipient

2nd Prize: No recipient

3rd Prize: Mikhail Leontyev, Russia

Finalists: Keita Matsui, Japan; Julien Jean Leroy, France

16th Competition in 2012

1st Prize: No recipient

2nd Prize: No recipient

3rd Prize: No recipient

Finalists: Maja Metelska, Poland; Mayana Ishizaki, Japan; Yuko Tanaka, Japan

17th Competition in 2015

1st Prize: Diego Martin Etxebarria, Spain

2nd Prize: Gen Ota, Japan

3rd Prize: Corinna Niemeyer, Germany

Finalists: Ondřej Vrabec, Czech Republic

18th Competition in 2018

1st Prize: Nodoka Okisawa, Japan

2nd Prize: Kanade Yokoyama, Japan

3rd Prize: Masaru Kumakura, Japan

Finalists: Earl Lee, Canada

19th Competition in 2021

1st Prize: José Soares, Brazil

2nd Prize: Samy Rachid, France

3rd Prize: Bertie Baigent, United Kingdom

Finalists: Satoshi Yoneda, Japan

20th Competition in 2024

1st Prize: Kornilios Michailidis (and Orchestra Award winner)

2nd Prize: Riley Court-Wood (and Audience Award winner)

3rd Prize: Ayano Yoshizaki (and Hideo Saito Award winner)
