= World Federation of International Music Competitions =

Swiss-based music organization

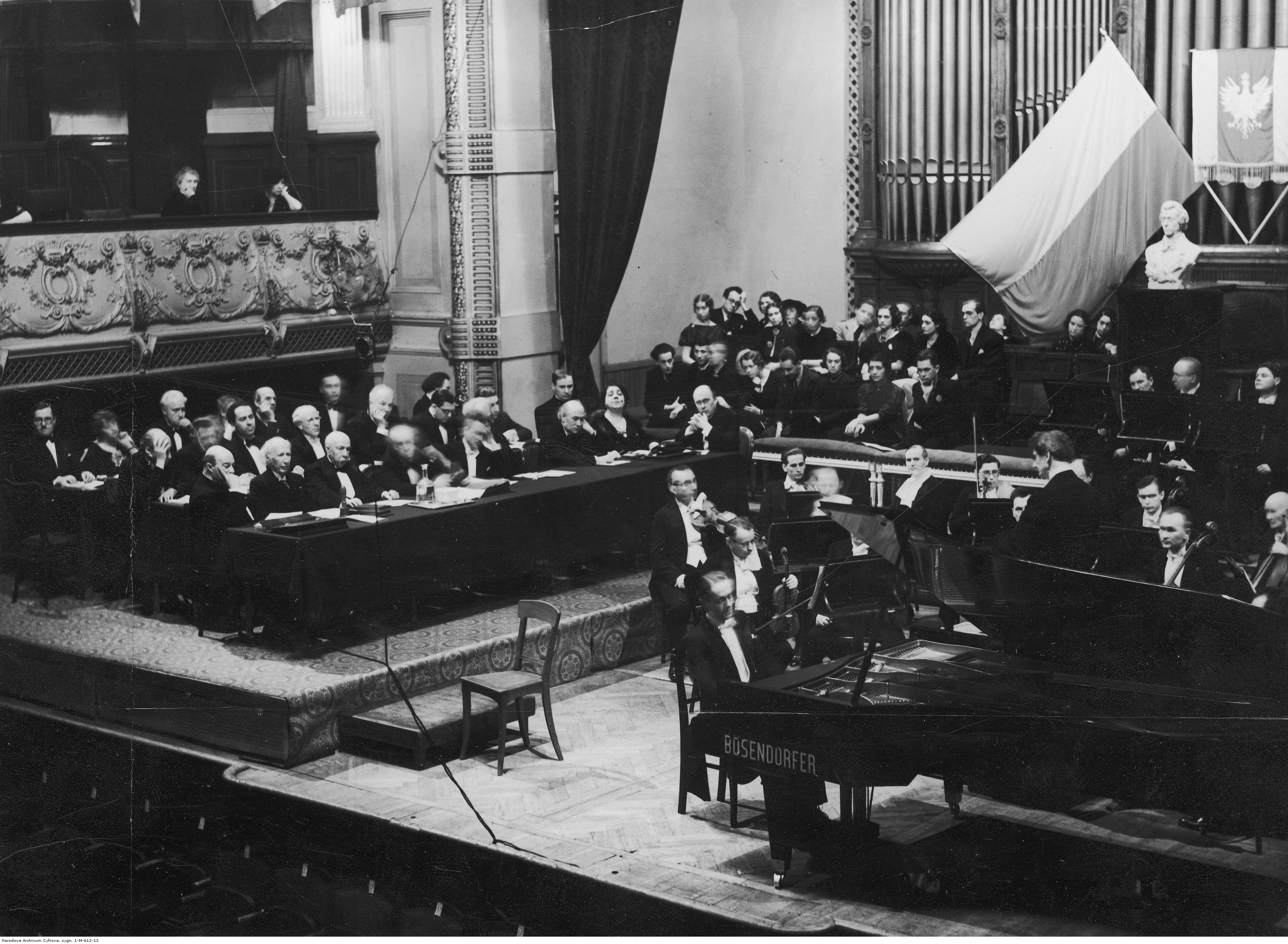
Chopin Competition final (3rd edition, 1937), one of the founding members of the federation.

The World Federation of International Music Competitions (WFIMC) is an organization based in Geneva, Switzerland that maintains a network of the internationally recognized organisations that aim to discover the most promising young talents in classical music through public competition. It was founded in 1957, and now 120 of the world's leading music competitions are members of the federation.

== Member organizations by year of membership ==
=== 1950s ===
==== 1957 (Founding members) ====
- (Germany) ARD International Music Competition, Munich
- (Hungary) Budapest International Music Competition, (Cello, Conducting & Piano) Franz Liszt International Piano Competition, Budapest
- (Italy) Ferruccio Busoni International Piano Competition, Bolzano
- (Poland) Frédéric Chopin International Piano Competition, Warsaw
- (Switzerland) Geneva International Music Competition, Geneva
- (Italy) Gian Battista Viotti International Music Competition, Vercelli
- (Poland) Henryk Wieniawski International Violin Competition, Poznań
- (France) Marguerite Long – Jacques Thibaud International Piano and Violin Competition, Paris
- (Italy) Niccolò Paganini International Violin Competition, Genoa
- (Czech Republic) Prague Spring International Music Festival
- (Belgium) Queen Elisabeth International Music Competition, Brussels

==== 1958 ====
- (Spain) Maria Canals International Piano Competition, Barcelona
- (France) Besançon International Competition for Young Conductors
- (Austria) International Beethoven Piano Competition Vienna
- (France) International singing competition of Toulouse

==== 1959 ====
- (Netherlands) International Vocal Competition 's-Hertogenbosch

=== 1960s ===
==== 1961 ====
- (Germany) Robert Schumann International Competition for Pianists and Singers, Zwickau

==== 1963 ====
- (Italy) Accademia Nazionale di Santa Cecilia International Composition Competition, Rome

==== 1965 ====
- (Germany) Johann Sebastian Bach International Music Competition, Leipzig
- (United Kingdom) Leeds International Piano Competition

==== 1968 ====
- (Portugal) José Vianna da Motta International Piano Competition, Lisbon

==== 1969 ====
- (United Kingdom) Carl Flesch International Violin Competition, London (last held in 1992)
- (Finland) Jean Sibelius International Violin Competition, Helsinki

=== 1970s ===
==== 1971 ====
- (Russia) Piotr Ilyich Tchaikovsky International Music Competition (piano, violin, cello, singing), Moscow (retracted in 2022)

==== 1973 ====
- (France) Grand Prix de Chartres

==== 1974 ====
- (Serbia) Jeunesses Musicales International Music Competition, Belgrade

==== 1975 ====
- (Italy) Alessandro Casagrande International Piano Competition, Terni
- (Israel) Arthur Rubinstein International Piano Master Competition, Tel Aviv
- (Greece) Grand Prix Maria Callas, Athens

==== 1976 ====
- (Italy) Alberto Curci International Violin Competition, Naples
- (Switzerland) Clara Haskil International Piano Competition, Vevey
- (Spain) Paloma O'Shea International Piano Competition, Santander
- (Switzerland) Sion International Violin Competition
- (Switzerland) Tibor Varga International Violin Competition, Martigny
- (Italy) Verdian Voices International Singing Competition, Busseto

==== 1977 ====
- (United States) Van Cliburn International Piano Competition, Fort Worth

==== 1978 ====
- (Australia) Sydney International Piano Competition
- (Croatia) Vaclav Huml International Violin Competition, Zagreb

==== 1979 ====
- (France) Épinal International Piano Competition

=== 1980s ===
==== 1980 ====
- (Austria) Fritz Kreisler International Violin Competition, Vienna
- (Poland) Grzegorz Fitelberg International Competition for Conductors, Katowice
- (United Kingdom) London String Quartet Competition
- (Germany) Ludwig Spohr International Violin Competition, Freiburg
- (United States) William Kapell International Piano Competition, College Park

==== 1981 ====
- (France) Bordeaux International String Quartet Competition
- (Denmark) Carl Nielsen International Music Competition (violin, organ, flute, clarinet), Odense
- (United States) Cleveland International Piano Competition
- (Chile) Dr. Luis Sigall International Music Competition (piano, violin, cello, guitar, singing), Viña del Mar
- (Italy) Michele Pittaluga International Classical Guitar Competition, Alessandria

==== 1982 ====
- (Belgium) Verviers International Singing Competition

==== 1983 ====
- (Spain) Francisco Viñas International Singing Competition, Barcelona
- (United States) Gina Bachauer International Piano Competition, Salt Lake City

==== 1984 ====
- (Canada) Banff International String Quartet Competition, Banff, Alberta
- (United States) International Violin Competition of Indianapolis
- (Italy) Vittorio Gui International Chamber Music Competition, Florence

==== 1985 ====
- (Italy) Rodolfo Lipizer International Violin Competition, Gorizia
- (Italy) Premio Valentino Bucchi, Rome

==== 1986 ====
- (Italy) Arturo Toscanini – Goffredo Petrassi International Conducting and Composition Competition, Parma
- (Spain) Francisco Tárrega International Guitar Competition, Benicàssim

==== 1987 ====
- (Switzerland) Géza Anda International Piano Competition, Zürich
- (Japan) Kobe International Flute Competition
- (Finland) Mirjam Helin International Singing CompetitionHelsinki
- (Spain) Pilar Bayona International Piano Competition, Zaragoza (disbanded after the 2001 edition)

==== 1988 ====
- (Spain) Bilbao International Singing Competition
- (Germany) Cologne International Music Competition (violin, piano, singing)

==== 1989 ====
- (Republic of Ireland) Dublin International Piano Competition

=== 1990s ===
==== 1990 ====
- (Austria) Franz Schubert and Modern Music International Music Competition, Graz
- (Italy) Trapani International Chamber Music Competition
- (United States) USA International Harp Competition, Bloomington
- (Austria) Wolfgang Amadeus Mozart International Music Competition, Salzburg

==== 1991 ====
- (Italy) Paolo Borciani International String Quartet Competition, Reggio Emilia
- (South Africa) UNISA International Music Competition, Pretoria

==== 1992 ====
- (Portugal) Cidade do Porto International Piano Competition
- (Netherlands) International Franz Liszt Piano Competition, Utrecht
- (Denmark) Odense International Organ Competition

==== 1993 ====
- (Italy) Antonio Pedretti International Conducting Competition, Trento
- (Spain) José Iturbi International Piano Competition, Valencia
- (Germany) Leopold Mozart International Violin Competition, Augsburg
- (Germany) Markneukirchen International Instrumental Competition
- (Norway) Queen Sonja International Music Competition, Oslo

==== 1994 ====
- (Lithuania) Mikalojus Konstantinas Ciurlionis International Piano and Organ Competition, Vilnius
- (United Kingdom) Scottish International Piano Competition, Glasgow

==== 1995 ====
- (Canada) Calgary International Organ Competition
- (Spain) Dos Hermanas International Clarinet Competition
- (Spain) Julián Gayarre – Pablo Sarasate International Singing and Violin Competition, Pamplona
- (Italy) Provincia di Caltanissetta International Chamber Music Competition
- (Germany) International Joseph Joachim Violin Competition, Hannover

==== 1996 ====
- (Italy) Città di Porcia International Music Competition (brass instruments)
- (Spain) "Ciutat de Tarragona" International Award for Musical Composition
- (Germany) Franz Schubert International Piano Competition, Dortmund
- (Australia) Melbourne International Chamber Music Competition

==== 1997 ====
- (Slovakia) Jan Nepomuk Hummel International Piano Competition, Bratislava
- (France) Marseille International Opera Competition
- (United States) Murray Dranoff International Two Piano Competition, Miami
- (France) Orléans International Piano Competition
- (Japan) Osaka International Chamber Music Competition
- (Russia) Sergei Prokofiev International Music Competition, Saint Petersburg

==== 1998 ====
- (Canada) Honens International Piano Competition, Calgary
- (Japan) Hamamatsu International Piano Competition
- (Italy) Trio di Trieste International Chamber Music Competition

=== 2000s ===
==== 2000 ====
- (France) Ville de Paris International Music Competition
- (Poland) Witold Lutoslawski International Cello Competition, Warsaw

==== 2001 ====
- (Germany) Alexander Girardi International Singing Competition, Coburg
- Luxembourg International Percussion Competition

==== 2002 ====
- (Romania) George Enescu International Piano Competition, Bucharest
- (United Kingdom) London International Piano Competition
- (Georgia (country)) Tbilisi International Piano Competition

==== 2003 ====
- (Japan) Musashino-Tokyo International Organ Competition
- (Japan) Mt. Fuji International Opera Competition of Shizuoka, Hamamatsu

==== 2004 ====
- (Spain) Cadaqués Orchestra International Conducting Competition
- (Ukraine) International Competition for Young Pianists in Memory of Vladimir Horowitz, Kyiv
- (Canada) Montreal International Musical Competition (piano, violin, singing)
- (Spain) Premio Jaén International Piano Competition
- (New Zealand) Michael Hill International Violin Competition, Auckland

==== 2005 ====
- (Italy) Città di Brescia International Violin Competition
- (Japan) Sendai International Music Competition (violin, piano)
- (Germany) Weimar International Music Competition (Franz Liszt – piano, Joseph Joachim – chamber music)

==== 2006 ====
- (South Korea) Isang Yun Competition, Tongyeong
- (France) Lyon International Chamber Music Competition
- (Germany) Pablo Casals International Cello Competition Kronberg
- (Switzerland) Saint-Maurice International Organ Competition

==== 2007 ====
- China International Piano Competition, Xiamen
- (Croatia) EPTA – Svetislav Stančić International Piano Competition, Zagreb
- (Netherlands) TROMP International Music Competition, Eindhoven

==== 2008 ====
- (Germany) Max Rostal International Viola and Violin Competition, Berlin
- (Sweden) Swedish International Duo Competition, Katrineholm

==== 2009 ====
- China International Singing Competition, Ningbo
- China International Violin Competition, Qingdao
- (South Korea) Jeju International Brass Competition
- (Finland) Maj Lind International Piano Competition, Helsinki
- (Italy) Rina Sala Gallo International Piano Competition, Monza
- (South Korea) Seoul International Music Competition (piano, violin, singing), Seoul
- (Germany) Telekom – Ludwig van Beethoven International Piano Competition, Bonn
- (Sweden) Wilhelm Stenhammar International Music Competition (for singers), Norrköping

=== 2010s ===
==== 2010 ====
- (Poland) Paderewski International Piano Competition, Bydgoszcz
- (China) Beijing International Music Competition, Beijing
- (Japan) Gaspar Cassado International Violoncello Competition, Hachioji

==== 2011 ====
- (Republic of Ireland) Veronica Dunne International Singing Competition, Dublin
- (Germany) The Aeolus International Competition for Wind Instruments, Düsseldorf
- International Oboe Competition of Japan, Karuizawa
- (Italy) International Chamber Music Competition "Città di Pinerolo", Pinerolo
- (Brazil) BNDES International Piano Competition, Rio de Janeiro
- (Croatia) International Competition of Young Conductors Lovro von Matačić, Zagreb

==== 2012 ====
- (Germany) International Violin Competition Henri Marteau, Lichtenberg and Hof
- (Germany) International J. M. Sperger Competition for Double Bass, Ludwigslust
- (Norway) Trondheim International Chamber Music Competition, Trondheim
- (United Kingdom) RNCM James Mottram International Piano Competition, Manchester

==== 2013 ====
- (Armenia) Khachaturian International Competition, Yerevan

==== 2014 ====
- (Japan) Tokyo International Music Competition for Conducting, Tokyo

==== 2015 ====
- International Grand Prix of Romania ”Trophaeum Artis Cantorum”, Bucharest
- China Shenzhen International Piano Concerto Competition, Shenzhen
- (Japan) Takamatsu International Piano Competition, Takamatsu
- (Norway) Top of the World International Piano Competition, Tromsø

==== 2016 ====
- Hong Kong International Piano Competition, Hong Kong
- (Canada) Canadian International Organ Competition, Montreal
- (Russia) Elena Obraztsova International Competition of Young Opera Singers, St Petersburg
- (Greece) Giorgos Thymis International Piano Competition, Thessaloniki

==== 2017 ====
- (Norway) International Edvard Grieg Piano Competition, Bergen
- (China) Schoenfeld International String Competition, Harbin
- (Turkey) International Piano Competition - Istanbul Orchestra'Sion, Istanbul
- (United States) Longwood Gardens International Organ Competition, Kennett Square
- (United States) Primrose International Viola Competition, Los Angeles
- (Norway) Princess Astrid International Music Competition, Trondheim

==== 2018 ====
- (Germany) Gustav Mahler Conducting Competition, Bamberg
- (China) Zhuhai International Mozart Competition, Zhuhai
- (United States) The Gurwitz International Piano Competition, Texas

==== 2019 ====
- (Italy) International Luciano Berio Composition Competition, Rome
- (China) Shanghai Isaac Stern International Violin Competition, Shanghai
- Singapore International Violin Competition, Singapore
- (Hungary) Éva Marton International Singing Competition, Budapest
- (Poland) International Stanisław Moniuszko Vocal Competition (Międzynarodowy Konkurs Wokalny im. Stanisława Moniuszki), Warsaw

=== 2020s ===
==== 2020 ====
- (Italy) The Girolamo Fantini Intertnational Trumpet Competition, Rome
- (Germany) Debut International Classical Singing Competition, Weikersheim

==== 2021 ====
- (Netherlands) DHF World Harp Competition, Utrecht
- (Canada) The Azrelli Music Prizes, Toronto
- (Portugal) Santa Cecilia Piano Competition, Porto

==== 2022 ====
- (Spain) Concurso Internacional de Piano Compositores de España (CIPCE), Las Rozas de Madrid
- (Italy) International Ettore Pozzoli Piano Competition, Seregno
- (Ukraine) Odesa International Violin Competition, Odesa
- (China) Ipea International Percussion Competition, Shanghai
- (United States) Olga Kern International Piano Competition, Albuquerque
- (Netherlands) International Conducting Competition Rotterdam, Rotterdam
- (Hungary) Bartók World Competition, Budapest
- (Lithuania) Lithuanian International Professional Music Competitions, Vilnius

==== 2023 ====
- Ilmari Hannikainen Piano Chamber Music Competition; Jyväskylä, Finland
- (United Kingdom) Hastings International Piano Concerto Competition; Hastings, UK

==== 2024 ====
- Adelaide International Guitar Competition, Adelaide, Australia
- Stuttgart International Violin Competition, Stuttgart, Germany
- (United States) New Orleans International Piano Competition, New Orleans, USA
- Daegu International Vocal Music Competition, Daegu, South Korea

== See also ==
- List of classical music competitions
