= Theo Tromp =

Dutch politician and engineer

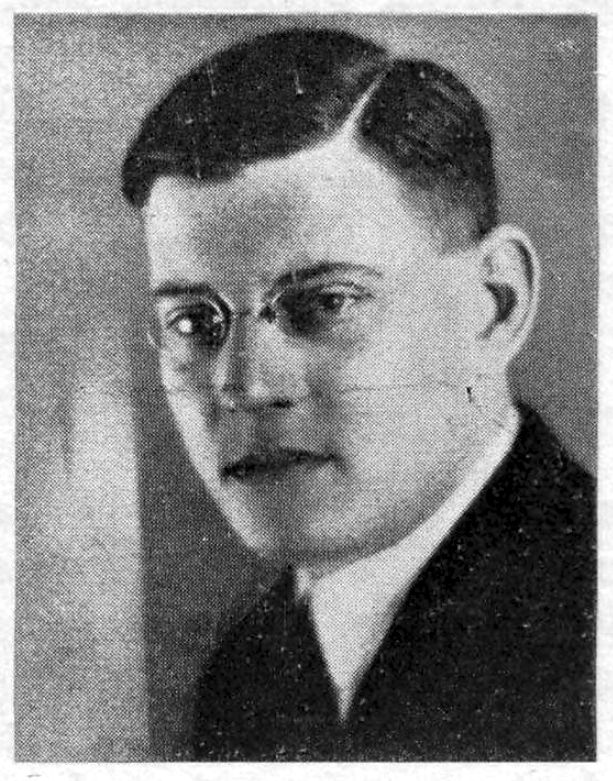
Ir. Th. Ph. Tromp, 1937

Theodoor Philibert "Theo" Tromp (9 June 1903, Voorburg – 1 June 1984, Eindhoven) was a Dutch politician and engineer.

Tromp was a mechanical engineer working at Philips since 1927, who in 1945, in the last Dutch government in exile (cabinet-Gerbrandy III), was Minister of Water Management. Before that he already was a member of the College of Agriculture, Trade and Industry in the liberated south. From 1947, he was a member of Philips' board of directors, of which he was vice president from 1957 until his retirement in 1967. He was known to Philips as a fairly authoritarian manager.
