= Pilar Bayona Piano Competition =

Annual piano competition in Zaragoza, Spain

The Pilar Bayona Piano Competition was a piano competition held in Zaragoza in memory of pianist Pilar Bayona (1897-1979). It was dissolved in 2004 and converted into a series of grants for Aragonese musicians. It was a member of the World Federation of International Music Competitions.

== 1st prize winners ==
- 1983 (Belgium) Johan Schmidt
- 1985 (Sweden) Martin Söderberg
- 1987 (West Germany) Igor Kamenz
- 1989 (Soviet Union) Oleg Marshev
- 1992 (Spain) Claudio Martínez Mehner
- 1995 (Ukraine) Valeria Resian
- 1998 (Israel) Dror Biran
- 2001 (Italy) Domenico Codispoti

== Other notable winners ==
- (Soviet Union) (Lithuania) Petras Geniusas 1989, 2nd prize.
- (Russia) Kirill Gerstein 1998, 2nd prize.
- (Russia) Alexandre Moutouzkine 2001, 3rd prize.
- (France) Jean-Pierre Ferey 1983, special prize.
