= The Dranoff International Two Piano Foundation =

The Dranoff International Two Piano Foundation is an American classical music organization, based in Miami, Florida. Throughout the years, its mission was to introduce, to educate and to invite the widest possible audience to the world of music, with special emphasis on four-hand chamber music for piano. Since 1987, the foundation has been the leader for the renaissance of duo pianism.

The competition is a biennial two piano and piano four-hand competition. It is opened to artists up to 33 years of age. At the time of its creation, it was the first such competition in the world. Some of the most successful piano duos in the world are former Dranoff International Two Piano Competition winners.

== Alvin Perlman Commission ==
The Alvin Perlman Commission is an undertaking by the foundation to expand the two piano repertoire. Each competition year, a major composer is commissioned to composer a piece. In addition to this piece being forever added to the performance canon, it also serves as a required work for the competition's finals. Some of the most significant commissioned pieces are Two Pianos by Morton Gould, Variations Concertantes by Michel Legrand, Recuerdos by William Bolcom, Taschyag by Paul Schoenfield, Six Variations for Pianos by Ned Rorem, Chiaroscuro by John Corigliano, Bachanale by Rovert Xavier Rodriguez and Lillibulero Variationsby Sir Richard Rodney Bennett.

== Piano Slam ==
Piano Slam is a community outreach and engagement project with the purpose of introducing classical music to underprivileged school children in the Miami area. A number of public schools are visited by classical artists, pop artists and poets, while the children are encouraged to compose poetry relating to a certain musical work. A panel then awards prizes for the best works, and the students also have the opportunity to premiere them in front of a live audience at the Adrienne Arscht Center for the Arts in Miami, Florida.
