= Khachaturian International Competition =

The Khachaturian International Competition is a classical classical music competition held every year in Yerevan, Armenia for pianists, violinists, cellists and conductors between 16 and 35 years of age. The competition is named after Armenian composer Aram Khachaturian.

The Khachaturian International Competition was founded in the Republic of Armenia in 2003 to commemorate the 100th anniversary of Aram Khachaturian. Each year, it officially starts on June 6, the birthday of Aram Khachaturian.

The artistic director of the competition is conductor Sergey Smbatyan.

Every year the competition is held in a specific category: piano, violin, cello and conducting.

Since 2013, the competition has been a member of the World Federation of International Music Competitions (WFIMC).

The competition is organized by Aram Khachaturian Cultural Foundation with the support of Armenia's Ministry of Education, Science, Culture and Sports.

== Prizes ==
A cash prize of US$10,000 is awarded to the first-place winner of the competition, with additional special awards presented to other prize recipients. Winners also receive the opportunity to perform a special concert with the Armenian State Symphony Orchestra, the competition's official orchestra, for the following concert season. There are also additional special prizes, including a special diploma to the second, third, and fourth prize winners, as well as a special award for the best performance of Khachaturian's composition and the audience award.

In the conducting category, in collaboration with the Aram Khachaturian House-Museum, the first-place winner is granted the unique opportunity to conduct the orchestra using Aram Khachaturian's baton during the competition's award ceremony and gala concert and also receives a personal copy of the baton. Additional awards are presented for the best performances of Khachaturian's works or other selected compositions.

== Prize winners ==
Winners of the prizes awarded in the given year and category.

Category	Year	First prize
piano	2003	Tanya Gabrielian (USA)
violin	2005	Satenik Khurdoyan (France) Martin Yavryan (Armenia)
cello	2006	Narek Hakhnazaryan (Armenia)
piano	2007	Sofia Bugayan (Russia)
violin	2008	Not awarded
cello	2010	Evgeny Rumyantsev (Russia) Luca Magariello (Italy)
violin	2010	Lia Yakupova (Russia) Jaroslaw Nadrzycki (Poland)
composing	2011	Alexandr Iradyan (Armnia) Peng Tsao (China)
piano	2011	Tikhon Khrennikov (Russia)
violin	2012	Gran prix: Feodor Rudin (Russia/France) First prize: Pavel Milyukov (Russia), Tanabe Ayako (Japan)
cello	2013	Andrei Ioniță (Romania)
piano	2014	Anastasia Nesterova (Russia)
violin	2015	Iva Miletic (Serbia)
conducting	2016	June-Sung Park (South Korea/Germany) Miran Vaupotić (Croatia)
vocal	2017	Julietta Aleksanyan (Armenia)
cello	2018	Jonathan Swensen (Denmark)
piano	2019	Hripsime Aghakaryan (Armenia)
violin	2020	Diana Adamyan (Armenia)
conducting	2021	Daichi Deguchi (Japan)
cello	2022	Ettore Pagano (Italy)
piano	2023	Arina Antonosian (Armenia)
violin	2024	Tomotaka Seki (Japan)
conducting	2025	Fernando Oscar Gaggini (Australia) Leonard Raymond William Weiss (Argentina)

== History ==
The competition was established on June 6, 2003, in commemoration of the 100th anniversary of the Armenian composer Aram Khachaturian. The first edition of the competition was held in the category of piano, and the winner was American Armenian pianist Tanya Gabrielian. Initially, the competition was also held in the categories of composition and vocal, but these categories are no longer offered.

Throughout its 22-year history, the Khachaturian International Competition has included participants from Russia, CIS countries, the United States, Canada, Latin American countries, France, Germany, Spain, Italy, Belgium, Portugal, the United Kingdom, Lithuania, Serbia, Poland, China, South Korea, Japan, and others.

=== COVID-19 and the competition ===
In response to the global COVID-19 pandemic and the resulting restrictions on social movement, the 16th Aram Khachaturian International Competition in 2020 was reformatted and held online for the first time. The violin category was conducted entirely in a virtual environment that met all the competition's requirements, incorporating artificial intelligence technologies.

=== Jury members ===
Over its nearly two-decade history, the competition has had the honor of including many renowned artists and musicians on its jury, including Grigori Zhislin, Jean Ter-Merguerian, Zakhar Bron, Vladimir Landsman, Jasper Parrott, Rustem Hayroudinoff, Chun Pan, Boris Kuschnir, Sergey Khachatryan, Lucy Ishkhanian, Alexander Sokolov, Svetlana Navasardyan, and others.

== Official orchestra ==
The official orchestra of the competition is the Armenian State Symphony Orchestra. The artistic director and Principal Conductor of the orchestra, Sergey Smbatyan is also the artistic director of the competition.

== See also ==
- Aram Khachaturian
- Armenian State Symphony Orchestra
