= Franz Schubert and Modern Music Competition =

International chamber music award

- International Chamber Music Competition
- Awarded for: Chamber music
- Date: 1989
- Venue: University of Music and Performing Arts Graz
- Country: Austria
- Motto: International Chamber Music Competition
- Reward: totalling €74,000
- Website: schubert.kug.ac.at/en

The Franz Schubert and Modern Music Competition (FS&MM) is an international triennial chamber music contest held in Graz, Austria. It was founded in 1989 by the University of Music and Performing Arts Graz.

The chamber music competition is one of three major competitions held in Austria, the other two being the International Mozart Competition in Salzburg and the Beethoven International Music Competition in Vienna.

== Mission and musical focus ==
The competition's mission is to present Schubert's chamber music in the context of contemporary chamber works so as to simultaneously interpret, at the highest level, the music of Franz Schubert alongside modern music.

== Composition competition ==
There is also an international composition competition held under the auspices of the FS&MM that endeavours to encourage the creation of new chamber works. The 7th edition of the International Composition Competition Piano Trio was held in 2024 and sought contemporary compositions for Piano Trio (piano, violin and violoncello). The winning composition became a set work in the piano trio repertoire of the second round of the main competition held in February 2025, and led to the winning work's premiere with repeat performances. Composers from 54 countries submitted 206 trios.

== 2025 competition ==
The 12th international chamber music competition was held 8–15 February 2025, at the University of Music and Performing Arts Graz. The eligibility requirements for the 2025 competition were for international musicians born after 15 February 1989. For this edition of the competition 49 ensembles were selected from 325 overall entrants from 44 countries.

The categories were:

- Lied duo (voice and piano)
- Piano trio (violin and violoncello)
- Piano duo (including four hands at one piano)

The prizes awarded in the 12th competition totalled more than €74,000 and included mentoring and professional advice on career development for the winners of the first prizes.

The jury for the Lied Duo category comprised Joseph Breinl (Germany), Lina Maria Åkerlund (Switzerland), Iain Burnside (Great Britain), Samuel Hasselhorn (Germany), Manuela Kerer (Italy), Tony Spence (Great Britain), Pauliina Tukiainen (Finland) and Sarah Wegener (Germany/Great Britain).

The jury for the Piano Trio category comprised Chia Chou (Canada), Vincent Coq (France), Ellen Margrete Flesjø (Norway), Thomas Hoppe (Germany), Anssi Karttunen (Finland), Minna Pensola (Finland), Isabelle Van Keulen (The Netherlands) and Katharina Wincor (Australia).

The Piano Duo jury members were: Sivan-Silver-Garburg & Gil Garburg (Israel), Shani Diluka (France), Carlo Fabiano (Italy), Rico Gulda (Austria), Götz Schumacher (Germany), Adrienne Soós (Hungary/Switzerland), Arie Vardi (Israel) and Lena-Lisa Wüstendörfer (Switzerland).

For the finals, the jury was augmented with five culturally prominent people from the music world: Annett Baumeister (Germany), Inna Davidova (Latvia), Birgit Hinterholzer (Austria), Ulf Werner (Germany), and Michael Nemeth (Austria).

=== Semi-finalists ===
The semifinals were held over two days, 10–11 February 2025.

Duo for voice and piano (Lied)

- Bound in Breath
- Duo Ardea
- Duo Felsberga & Eckhaut
- Duo Noh Pfahler
- Feldmann-Domanski Duo
- Liedduo Bæk-Dragomir
- Liedduo Stefanie Knorr & Gracia Steinemann
- Rike

Trio for piano, violin and violoncello

- Accio Piano Trio
- Astatine Trio
- Bernstein Trio
- Trio Brontë
- Trio E.T.A.
- Trio Goldmund
- Trio Havisham

Piano Duo

- Beatrice & Eleonora Dallagnese
- Duo Crewir
- Duo Panova Gobbini
- Happy Dog Duo
- Hoinar Ensemble
- Książek Piano Duo
- Piano Duo Kalabova & Gugg
- Pianoduo K&K

=== Finalists ===
Four duos for voice and piano, four piano trios and three piano duos were admitted to the final round which was held over two days, 12 to 13 February 2025.

Duo for voice and piano (Lied)

- Duo Ardea
- Duo Felsberga & Eckhaut
- Duo Noh Pfahler
- Feldmann-Domanski Duo

Trio for piano, violin and violoncello

- Astatine Trio
- Bernstein Trio
- Trio Brontë
- Trio Goldmund

Piano Duo

- Beatrice & Eleonora Dallagnese
- Książek Piano Duo
- Piano Duo Kalabova & Gugg

=== 2025 winners ===
Duo for voice and piano (Lied):

- 1st Prize: Felsberga & Eckhaut (Note: Duo Felsberga & Eckhaut were also awarded a prize for the best interpretation of a specially commissioned work by German composer Annette Schlünz.)
- 2nd Prize: Noh & Pfahler
- 3rd Prize: Duo Ardea

Trio for piano, violin and violoncello:

- 1st Prize: Trio Brontë (Note: Members of the extended jury awarded Trio Brontë a special prize for professional CD production and promotion of a physical and digital CD release on the Solo Musica label.)
- 2nd Prize: Astatine Trio (Note: Astatine Trio were also awarded the special interpretative prize for their performance of Xiaowen Lei's Fields, Cities, Skies, and Ruins (2024) which was the prize-winning composition from the International Piano Trio Composition Competition 2024.)
- 3rd Prize: Bernstein Trio

Piano Duo:

- 1st Prize: Piano Duo Kalabova & Gugg
- 2nd Prize: Książek Piano Duo
- 3rd Prize: Beatrice & Eleonora Dallagnese
- Special Prize: Duo Panova Gobbini (Note: Duo Panova Gobbini were awarded a special prize of €1,000 for the best interpretation of a composition by a female composer.)

== 2022 competition ==
The 2022 competition saw 36 lied duos and 24 piano trios enter the first round after having been selected from a total of 249 instrumentalists from 40 countries. More specifically, 36 out of 75 applicants were admitted to the first round of the duo for voice and piano category and 24 out of 33 applicants made it through to the piano trio first round. These were further pared-down to 12 lied duos and 9 piano trios in the semifinals.

In the 2022 finals, the first prize was not awarded in the lied duo category.

Duo for voice and piano (Lied)

- 1st prize: (Not awarded)
- 2nd prize: Joint award to Duo Bella Adamova & Malte Schäfer (Czech Republic/Germany) and Duo André Baleiro & Pedro Costa (Portugal)
- 3rd prize: Duo Sawako Kayaki & Haruka Ebina (Japan)

The third-tier category was awarded with a special prize for the best interpretation of a specially commissioned work, On White Meadows, (Note: On White Meadows was commissioned by the Franz Schubert and Modern Music Competition which took place at the University of Music and Performing Arts, Graz, in 2021.) by Judith Weir.

Trio for piano, violin and violoncello

- 1st prize and special prize for the best interpretation of the prize-winning work of the International Piano Trio Composition Competition: Trio Orelon (Italy/Germany/Spain)
- 2nd prize: Trio Unio (South Korea)
- 3rd prize: Soleri Trio (Germany)

== 2018 competition ==
The 10th international chamber music competition was held between 19 and 28 February 2018, in Graz and around €100,000 in aggregate prize value across the various categories was awarded.

During the course of the competition, 341 (Note: Another source states 189 for the total number of young musicians and singers who took part in the 2018 competition.) entrants from 56 countries forming 92 duos for voice and piano, 35 trios for piano, violin and cello and 13 string quartets, competed for the chamber music awards.

The first and second categories in the competition were lied duo and piano trio, however, the third category in the 2018 competition was for string quartet. This edition of the competition also had an Audience Engagement Award that was given to the Gildas Quartet.

The second round of the piano trio category saw the world première of Stück 2 (2017) by Jungjik Kim of South Korea, the award-winning piano trio from the 2017 composition competition edition of the Franz Schubert and Modern Music Competition.

String quartet

The Ãtma Quartet, from Poland, won an incentive award and the Bärenreiter Urtext Prize. A special career advancement prize was awarded to the New Music Quartet (Poland).

- 1st prize: Simply Quartet (China/Austria/Norway)
- 2nd prize: (not awarded)
- 3rd prize: (not awarded)

Lied duo

- 1st prize: Duo Mikhail Timoshenko & Elitsa Desseva (Russia/Bulgaria)
- 2nd prize: Duo Sophia Burgos & Daniel Gerzenberg (USA/Germany)
- 3rd prize: Duo Jussi Juola & Ine Kang (Finland/Republic of Korea)

Piano trio

- 1st prize: (not awarded)
- 2nd prize: Trio Marvin (Kazakhstan/Russia/Germany)
- 3rd prize: Trio Gallien (France)

== External ==
- Official website
