= 2008 Valencia International Piano Competition Prize Iturbi =

Valencia International Piano Competition Prize Iturbi XVI took take place in Valencia from September 15–27, 2008. It was won by Zhengyu Chen, who became the first Chinese pianist to attain the 1st prize.

== Jury ==
  - (Spain) Joaquín Soriano (president)
  - (Italy) Antonio di Cristofano
  - (Azerbaijan) (Russia) (United States) Bella Davidovich
  - (Lithuania) Petras Geniusas
  - (Austria) Peter Lang
  - (Russia) (Spain) Stanislav Pochekin
  - (Spain) Fernando Puchol
  - (Spain) Jesús Ángel Rodríguez
  - (Italy) Maria Tipo
  - (Japan) Fujiko Yamada

== Prizes ==
	Winner	Prize	Sponsor
1st Grand Prize	(China) Zhengyu Chen	18.000 € + CD + Concert tour	Diputación de Valencia
2nd Prize	(South Korea) Soyeon Kim	12.000 € + Concerts in Valencia	Diputación de Valencia
3rd Prize	(Moldova) (Russia) (Spain) Marianna Prjevalskaya	6.000 € + Concerts in Valencia	Diputación de Valencia
4th Prize	(Spain) Ángel Cabrera	4.000 €	Bancaja
5th Prize	(Italy) Angelo Arciglione	3.000 €	Ayuntamiento de Valencia
6th Prize	(South Korea) Yu-Mi Lee	1.900 €	Sociedad Filarmónica de Valencia
7th Prize^{22}	void	1.600 €	Bancaja
Best Chopin performance	void	2.500 €	Mrs. Heide Wolf
Kawai Prize^{2}	(Moldova) (Russia) (Spain) Marianna Prjevalskaya	1.900 €	Kawai-España
Yamaha Premium^{3}	(South Korea) Soyeon Kim	1.900 €	Yamaha-Música Ibérica
Clemente Pianos Prize^{4}	(China) Zhengyu Chen	1.900 €	Clemente Pianos
Diputación Prize^{5}	(Spain) Ángel Cabrera	1.600 €	Diputación de Valencia

- ^1 Awarded to the best qualified Valencian competitor.
- ^2 Awarded to the best qualified Spanish competitor.
- ^3 Awarded to the best Spanish contemporary music performer.
- ^4 Awarded to the best Concerto performer.
- ^5 Awarded to the best Spanish music performer.

== Compositions commissioned for the competition ==
  - Emilio Calandín - Tres naipes del I Ching
  - Miguel Gálvez-Taroncher - Chronos / Kayros
  - Enrique Sanz-Burguete - A Matilde

== Competition Results (by rounds) ==
=== First round ===
September 16 and 17. Palau de la Música - Sala Rodrigo.

- Domenico Scarlatti / Antonio Soler Sonata + Two pieces among Frédéric Chopin's Nocturnes, Impromptus, Mazurkas and Waltzes + Gabriel Fauré / Claude Debussy / Maurice Ravel composition + Ad libitum.
  - (Germany) (United Kingdom) Ron Abramski
  - (Spain) Mario Alonso Herrero
  - (Italy) Angelo Arciglione
  - (France) Honoré Béjin Garcia
  - (Spain) Enrique Bernaldo de Quirós Martín
  - (Russia) Tatyana Bezmenova
  - (Norway) Ingfrid Breie Nyhus
  - Northern Ireland Cathal Breslin
  - (Spain) Ángel Cabrera
  - (Switzerland) Christian Chamorel
  - (China) Zhengyu Chen
  - (China) Wu Chi
  - (Italy) Sebastian Di Bin
  - (Italy) Nazareno Ferrugio
  - (Croatia) Martina Filjak
  - (Russia) Sofya Gulyak
  - (Japan) Shinnosuke Inugai
  - (South Korea) Soyeon Kim
  - (Belarus) Karalina Kirylchyk
  - (North Korea) Yun Jung Koo
  - (Poland) (United States) Martin Labazevitch
  - (Lithuania) Daiva Lavrinavičiūtė
  - (Russia) Aleksey Lebedev
  - (Taiwan) Li-Wei Lee
  - (South Korea) Yu Mi Lee
  - (Spain) José Menor Martín
  - (Greece) Theodosia Ntokou
  - (Italy) Vincenzo Oliva
  - (Japan) Fumie Onda
  - (South Korea) Jin Woo Park
  - (South Korea) Joo Hyeon Park
  - (France) Tristan Pfaff
  - (Moldova) (Russia) (Spain) Marianna Prjevalskaya
  - (North Macedonia) Ivana Ristova
  - (Russia) Daniil Sayamov
  - (Russia) Sergey Sobolev
  - (Japan) Masataka Takada
  - (Japan) Yoshida Tomoaki
  - (Russia) Maria Tretiyakova
  - (Russia) Andrey Yaroshinsky

=== Quarter-finals ===
September 18, 19 and 20. Palau de la Música - Sala Rodrigo.

- Joseph Haydn / Wolfgang Amadeus Mozart / Ludwig van Beethoven Sonata or Variations + Frédéric Chopin Etude + Isaac Albéniz (Iberia) / Enrique Granados (Goyescas) / Manuel de Falla (Fantasía Bética, Cuatro piezas españolas) composition
  - (Germany) (United Kingdom) Ron Abramski
  - (Italy) Angelo Arciglione
  - (Russia) Tatyana Bezmenova
  - (Spain) Ángel Cabrera
  - (Switzerland) Christian Chamorel
  - (China) Zhengyu Chen
  - (Italy) Sebastian Di Bin
  - (Italy) Nazareno Ferrugio
  - (Japan) Shinnosuke Inugai
  - (South Korea) Soyeon Kim
  - (North Korea) Yun Jung Koo
  - (Poland) (United States) Martin Labazevitch
  - (Russia) Aleksey Lebedev
  - (South Korea) Yu-Mi Lee
  - (Japan) Fumie Onda
  - (France) Tristan Pfaff
  - (Moldova) (Russia) (Spain) Marianna Prjevalskaya
  - (Russia) Maria Tretiyakova

=== Semi-finals ===
September 21 and 22. Palau de la Música - Sala Rodrigo.

- Romantic composition/s + Mandatory contemporary composition.
  - (Germany) (United Kingdom) Ron Abramsky
  - (Italy) Angelo Arciglione
  - (Spain) Ángel Cabrera
  - (Switzerland) Christian Chamorel
  - (China) Zhengyu Chen
  - (Japan) Shinnosuke Inugai
  - (South Korea) Soyeon Kim
  - (North Korea) Yun Jung Koo
  - (Poland) (United States) Martin Labazevitch
  - (South Korea) Yu-Mi Lee
  - (France) Tristan Pfaff (withdrawal)
  - (Moldova) (Russia) (Spain) Marianna Prjevalskaya

=== Final ===
September 26 and 27. Palau de la Música - Sala Iturbi.

  - (Italy) Angelo Arciglione --- Frédéric Chopin: 2nd.
  - (Spain) Ángel Cabrera --- Frédéric Chopin: 2nd.
  - (China) Zhengyu Chen --- Ferenc Liszt: 1st.
  - (South Korea) Soyeon Kim --- Piotr Ilyich Tchaikovsky: 1st.
  - (South Korea) Yu-Mi Lee --- Piotr Ilyich Tchaikovsky: 1st.
  - (Moldova) (Russia) (Spain) Marianna Prjevalskaya --- Frédéric Chopin: 1st.

Orquesta de Valencia. Max Bragado, conductor.
