= Clarinet sonata =

Musical composition for clarinet

A clarinet sonata is piece of music in sonata form for clarinet, often with piano accompaniment.

The Two Clarinet Sonatas by Brahms are of special significance in the development of the clarinet repertoire. Several important transcriptions are also possible, including sonatas by Mozart, Schubert, Reinecke, Copland, and Prokofiev.

== Clarinet sonatas ==
This list is approximately in chronological order.

- François Devienne: Clarinet sonata no.1 (1798), Clarinet sonata no.2 (1798)
- Ferdinand Ries: Clarinet Sonata, Op. 29 (1808)
- Carl Maria von Weber: Grand Duo Concertant, Op. 48 (1816)
- Felix Mendelssohn: Clarinet Sonata (1824)
- Alice Mary Smith: Clarinet Sonata (1870)
- Charles Swinnerton Heap: Clarinet Sonata (1879)
- Theodore Gouvy: Clarinet Sonata, Op. 76 (1882)
- Ebenezer Prout: Clarinet Sonata, Op. 26 (1882)
- Felix Draeseke: Clarinet Sonata (1887), which also can be played by a violin
- Samuel Coleridge-Taylor: Clarinet Sonata (c1893)
- Josef Rheinberger:Clarinet Sonata, Op. 105a (1893)
- Johannes Brahms:
  - Clarinet Sonata No. 1 (1894)
  - Clarinet Sonata No. 2 (1894)
- William Henry Hadow: Clarinet Sonata (1897)
- Max Reger:
  - Clarinet Sonata No. 1 (1900)
  - Clarinet Sonata No. 2 (1900)
  - Clarinet Sonata No. 3 (1909)
- Donald Francis Tovey: Clarinet Sonata in B♭ major, Op. 16 (1906)
- Charles Villiers Stanford: Clarinet Sonata, Op. 129 (1912), which can also be played by a viola
- Camille Saint-Saëns: Clarinet Sonata (1921)
- William Henry Bell: Clarinet Sonata in D minor (1926)
- Darius Milhaud: Sonatina for Clarinet (1927)
- George Frederick Linstead: Clarinet Sonata (1932?)
- John Cage: Sonata for Solo Clarinet (1933)
- Arnold Bax:
  - Clarinet Sonata in E major (1901)
  - Clarinet Sonata in D major (1934)
- Antoni Szalowski: Clarinet Sonatina (1936)
- Mary Lucas: Clarinet Sonata (1938)
- Paul Hindemith: Clarinet Sonata (1939)
- Roger Fiske: Clarinet Sonata (1941)
- Leonard Bernstein: Sonata for Clarinet and Piano (1942)
- Aaron Copland: Sonata for Clarinet (Violin) and Piano (1943)
- York Bowen: Clarinet Sonata (1943)
- John Ireland: Fantasy Sonata (1943)
- Sergei Prokofiev: Sonata for Clarinet and Piano, Op.94 (1943), originally for flute, also arranged for violin
- Mario Castelnuovo-Tedesco: Sonata for Clarinet and Piano, Op. 128 (1945)
- Nino Rota: Sonata in D major for Clarinet and Piano (1945)
- Mieczysław Weinberg: Sonata for Clarinet and Piano, Op. 28 (1945)
- Herbert Howells: Clarinet Sonata (1946)
- Marga Richter: Sonata for Clarinet and Piano (1948)
- Christopher Shaw: Clarinet Sonata (1949)
- Malcolm Arnold: Clarinet Sonatina (1951)
- Roger Fiske: Clarinet Sonatina (1951)
- Pamela Harrison: Clarinet Sonata (1954)
- Iain Hamilton: Clarinet Sonata, Op. 22 (1955)
- Ruth Gipps: Clarinet Sonata (1956)
- Bohuslav Martinů: Clarinet Sonatina, H. 356 (1956)
- Peter Maxwell Davies: Clarinet Sonata (1956)
- Arnold Cooke: Clarinet Sonata in B flat (1959)
- Francis Poulenc:
  - Sonata for two clarinets, Op. 7 (1918/1945)
  - Sonata for clarinet and bassoon, Op. 32 (1922/1945)
  - Clarinet Sonata (1962)
- Alun Hoddinott: Clarinet Sonata (1967)
- Carlos Guastavino : Clarinet sonata (1970)
- Vyacheslav Artyomov:
  - Sonata for clarinet solo (1966)
  - Confession, clarinet solo (1971)
- Derek Bourgeois: Clarinet Sonata (1975)
- Timothy Salter: Clarinet Sonata (1976)
- Antony Roper (1921–2013): Clarinet Sonata (1979)
- Joseph Horovitz: Clarinet Sonatina (1981)
- Graham Whettam: Clarinet Sonata (1988)
- Gary Carpenter: Clarinet Sonata (1991)
- Adam Gorb: Clarinet Sonata (1991)
- Marcus Blunt: Clarinet Sonata (1991)
- Jack Cooper: Sonata for Clarinet (1999)
- Michael Finnissy: Clarinet Sonata (2007)
- Peter Klatzow: Sonata (2007)
- Octavio Vazquez: Clarinet Sonata (2009)
- Dieter Lehnhoff: Sonata Urbana for Clarinet and Piano, Op. 30 (2010)
- Jennifer Higdon: Sonata for Clarinet & Piano (2011)
- Hendrik Hofmeyr: Clarinet Sonata (2013)
- Bruno Vlahek: Sonata for Clarinet and Piano, Op. 42 (2015)
- David Conte: Sonata for Clarinet and Piano (2019)
- Jerzy Fryderyk Wojciechowski: Sonata for Clarinet and Piano Op. 15 (2023)
