= 2010 Valencia International Piano Competition Prize Iturbi =

Valencia International Piano Competition Prize Iturbi XVII took place in Valencia from September 13–26, 2010. It was won by Russian pianist Andrey Yaroshinsky, who had been awarded the 2nd prize in 2006. Arta Arnicane and Alexey Lebedev were awarded the 2nd and 3rd prizes.

== Jury and Results ==
- (Spain) Joaquin Soriano (chairman)
- (Spain) Emilio Baró
- (France) Michel Béroff
- (France) Michel Dalberto
- (Poland) Elza Kolodin
- (Slovakia) Marián Lapšanský
- (South Korea) Kun-Woo Paik
- (Spain) Fernando Puchol
- (Spain) Rosa Torres-Pardo
- (Hungary) Tamás Ungár

Contestant	R1	R2	SF	F
(Latvia) Arta Arnicane				Silver medal
(Italy) Elisa D'Auria				
(Argentina) Juan Balat				
(Venezuela) Kristhyan Benítez				
(Italy) Giulio Biddau				6th
(Brazil) Fabiane de Castro				
(Spain) Miguel Ángel Castro				
(Italy) Pietro Ceresini				
(Switzerland) Christian Chamorel				4th
(Taiwan) Frederic Chen				
(South Korea) Shh-wei Chen				
(South Korea) Min-hye Cho				
(Russia) Ksenia Dyachenko				
(South Korea) Ana Hyoung				
(New Zealand) Mi-Yeon I				
(South Korea) Hayoung Jeong				
(South Korea) Minjeong Jeong				
(Russia) Eduard Kunz				
(Russia) Alexey Lebedev				Bronze medal
(Italy) Mattia Mistrangelo				
(South Korea) Zeeyoung Moon				5th
(Russia) Alexander Shaykin				
(Russia) Evgeny Starodubtsev				
(South Korea) Jenna Sung				
(Italy) Alessandro Taverna				
(Spain) Xavier Torres				
(Italy) Alessandro Trebeschi				
(Russia) Yana Vasilyeva				
(China) Jia Wang				
(China) Jingjing Wang				
(Russia) Andrey Yaroshinsky				Gold medal
