= Anastasia Rizikov =

- Born: Anastasia Rizikov; December 8, 1998 (age 27); Toronto, Ontario, Canada
- Genre: Classical
- Occupation: Pianist
- Instrument: Piano

Anastasia Rizikov (born December 8, 1998) is a Canadian classical pianist.

== Biography ==
Anastasia Rizikov was born in Toronto, Ontario, Canada. She began her studies at age of five, notably with Maia Spis at the Nadia Music Academy in Toronto. In 2017-2019 she studied Marian Rybicki at École Normale de Musique de Paris (Paris, France, 2019) where she received her Diplôme Supérieur de Concertiste. Ms. Rizikov also has played in master classes for Sergei Babayan, Vladimir Feltsman, Awadagin Pratt, Arie Vardi, Robert Levin, Ferenc Rados, Anatoly Ryabov, Oxana Yablonskaya, and has worked with András Schiff, Emanuel Ax, Menahem Pressler, Gabor Takács-Nagy, and Olga Kern.

In 2017 she won 3rd Prizes at 6th Tbilisi International Piano Competition and 63rd Maria Canals International Music Competition receiving special prizes: “For the best foreign performer of a Georgian Composer’s work” (Tbilisi, Georgia, 2017); “Special Prize to the youngest semi-finalist”, “Special Prize to the best performance of Isaac Albeniz’s music’, and “Special Prize to the best performance of Frederic Mompou's music”, (Barcelona, Spain, 2017). Earlier, in September, 2015 she received 1st place in the Ettore Pozzoli International Piano Competition in Seregno, Italy, along with prizes for best compulsory work by E. Pozzoli, and audience prize. On April 17 2015, at age 16, Anastasia Rizikov won the Gold Medal and all other prizes in the 57th Jaén International Piano Competition in Jaén, Spain. In November 2013 she won the first prize in the 13th «Giuliano Pecar» International Piano Competition in Gorizia, Italy. In May 2011, she won the first prize in the Rotary International Piano Competition in Palma de Mallorca, Spain. In 2012, she performed the E. Grieg's Piano Concerto in A minor, op. 16 performance with Balearic Symphony Orchestra at Royal Palace of La Almudaina in Palma de Mallorca. In 2010, Anastasia won the first place in the Thousand Islands International Piano Competition for Young People (Cape Vincent, NY). She also won the first place at the American Protégé 2010 International Piano and Strings Competition and performed in New York City's Carnegie Hall. She had already performed at Carnegie Hall before, when, in 2009, Anastasia became the first-place winner at the Bradshaw and Buono International Piano Competition. In 2008, representing Canada, Anastasia performed in the Kremlin, Moscow at the international festival "Moscow Meets Friends", organized by Vladimir Spivakov's International Charity Foundation. In 2008, she performed at the fourth "Young Stars of the Young Century" Gala Concert organized by Vladimir Spivakov's Charity Foundation, which took place in the Toronto Centre for The Arts. In 2006, Anastasia became the first-place winner at The Vladimir Horowitz International Young Pianists Competition in Kyiv, Ukraine. She was also given a special award for Best Artistic Performance and, at age seven, made her orchestral debut, performing Polunin's Concertino in A minor with the National Philharmonic Symphony Orchestra of Ukraine, conducted by Mykola Diadiura at the Concert Hall of National Kyiv Philharmonic, the followed by a USA Concert Tour of Winners.

In Canada, Anastasia Rizikov is also a first prize winner at both the Canadian Music Competition (CMC) and the Canadian Chopin Competition. The Chopin Competition, held every five years, led to Anastasia's appearance at a gala winners' concert at Koerner Hall in Toronto. For the first five years of her musical career Anastasia won first places at several local competitions in the Greater Toronto Area, including Markham Music Festival, Yips Music Festival, North York Music Festival, Peel Music Festival, Davenport Music Festival, Toronto Music Competition, Kiwanis Music Festival of Greater Toronto, Kiwanis Provincial Music Festival, and the Canadian Music Competition (CMC).

In June, 2012 Anastasia was awarded the 2013 "Debut Atlantic" concert tour.

In December, 2012, in honour of Glenn Gould's 80th Anniversary Year and his Grammy Lifetime Achievement Award, The Glenn Gould Foundation has provided a C1X Yamaha baby grand piano to the "outstanding young pianist Anastasia Rizikov. Ms. Rizikov has the piano on an indefinite loan-basis to aid in her artistic and career development."

In 2014, at the age of 15, Anastasia has performed the Rachmaninoff No. 3 in D minor with the Orchestre symphonique de Laval conducted by Alain Trudel in Quebec.

Renée Silberman at The Beat Magazine wrote of Rizikov on January 21, 2014 that Ms. Rizikov is an extraordinary virtuoso, with abundant technical prowess. But she is more than the sum of ten fingers – she is a consummate artist, born to play, to love the art and act of music-making.

In 2015, Ms. Rizikov performed in major international music festivals like the Orford Music Festival, and the Verbier Music Festival.

Anastasia Rizikov gives concerts internationally, including Asia, Europe - Spain, Italy, Switzerland, France, Poland, Ukraine, Russia, to the United States, and Canada, where she has played in Carnegie Hall, Roy Thomson Hall, Koerner Hall, Fazioli Hall, Auditorio Manuel de Falla, Hong Kong City Hall, and the Kremlin.

Anastasia has performed with following orchestras: National Philharmonic Symphony Orchestra of Ukraine, Northwest Chicago Symphony Orchestra, Plymouth Symphony Orchestra (Michigan Philharmonic), Toronto Sinfonietta, International Symphony Orchestra, Orquesta Sinfónica de Baleares "Ciudad de Palma", National Academy Orchestra of Canada, Sinfonia Toronto, Toronto Symphony Orchestra, Michigan Philharmonic Orchestra, Orchestra London Canada, Symphony Nova Scotia, Northumberland Orchestra, Orchestre Symphonique de Laval, Orquesta Ciudad de Granada,; Motor City Symphony Orchestra, HKMA Orchestra, Niagara Symphony Orchestra, Dayton Philharmonic Orchestra, Kitchener-Waterloo Symphony Orchestra, Tbilisi Symphony Orchestra, Saskatoon Symphony Orchestra; and had worked with following conductors: Mykola Diadiura, Michael Holian, John Covelli, Nan Washburn, Matthew Jaskiewicz, Robert Debbaut, Salvador Brotons, Boris Brott, Berislav Skenderović, Shalom Bard, Nurhan Arman, Douglas A. Bianchi, Alain Trudel, Bernhard Gueller, John Kraus, Dina Gilbert, Paul Mann, Bradley Thachuk, Neal Gittleman, Andrei Feher and Michael Newnham.

Anastasia has given interviews and performances at Canadian Jazz FM 91 and Classical 96.3 FM radio stations, CBC Television news and CBC Radio, Rogers TV, Global Montreal TV, Russian MIX TV (City TV), the Ukrainian TV programs Svitohliad and Kontakt, Toronto Star newspaper, Wholenote magazine, and American WSKG-FM, WSKG-TV channels. An excerpt of one of her videos was briefly shown on The Oprah Winfrey Show during a feature on gifted children.

== Discography ==
- "WSKG Sessions" (2011),
  Anastasia Rizikov, piano
  DVD & CD
  WSKG-TV, Binghamton, NY, United States
- "Piano Recital" (2015)
  Anastasia Rizikov, piano
  CD
  Released on December 2, 2016
  Naxos Records, Jaén, Spain
