= Caio Pagano =

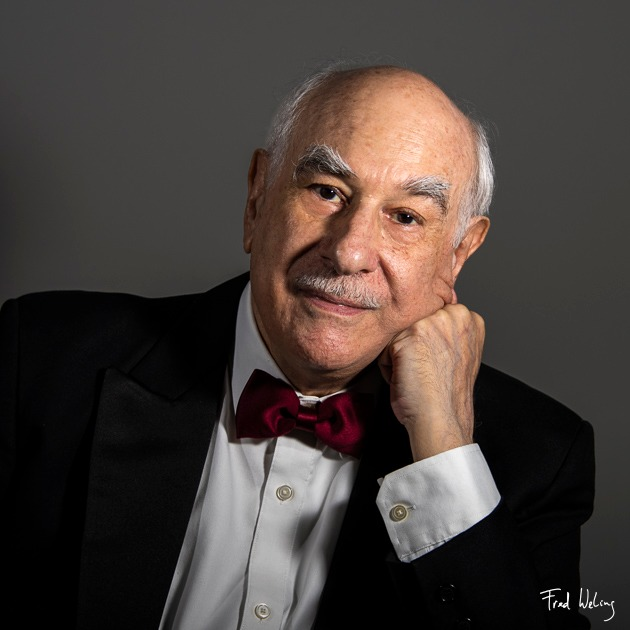
- Born: May 14, 1940; São Paulo, Brazil
- Education: Magda Tagliaferro School, Catholic University of America (DMA)
- Occupations: Concert pianist, Teacher, Professor
- Years active: 1963–present
- Employer: Arizona State University (Regents' Professor)
- Known for: Performances of Beethoven’s Diabelli Variations; promotion of Brazilian music
- Notable work: Premieres of works by Henri Pousseur, José A. R. de Almeida Prado, Gilberto Mendes, Paulo Chagas, Willy Corrêa de Oliveira, James DeMars
- Awards: Eldorado Music Award, Commander of the Order of Ipiranga

Caio Pagano (born May 14, 1940) is a Brazilian-American concert pianist and teacher. The New York Times has praised his performance of Beethoven’s esoteric Diabelli Variations as “absolutely first-class, simultaneously idiomatic and original,” and the Washington Post has written that “Pagano is such a fine performer that any opportunity to hear him should be seized.”

== Early life and education ==
Born in São Paulo, he began his piano studies at the age of eight with Lina Pires de Campos at the Magda Tagliaferro School, and at 16, he soloed with the Brazilian Symphony Orchestra under the baton of Eleazar de Carvalho. He then spent several years in additional studies in Europe, working with Tagliaferro (Paris and Salzburg), Sequeira Costa (Lisbon), Helena Costa (Porto), Karl Engel (Hanover), and Conrad Hansen (Hamburg).

== Career ==
He was soon performing extensively across the world. He has performed with conductors such as Morton Gould, John Neschling, Isaac Karabtchewsky, Sergiu Comissiona, Clotilde Otranto, Jorge Sarmientos, Camargo Guarnieri, Paul Freeman, Ivo Cruz, Howard Griffiths, and Szymon Goldberg, and appeared with orchestras such as the São Paulo State Symphony, the Baltimore Symphony, the National Symphony of Washington, Orchestre philharmonique de radio France, the Phoenix Symphony, and the National Orchestras of Guatemala, Portugal, and the Czech Republic. Notable venues where Pagano has performed include Alice Tully Hall (New York), the Kennedy Center (Washington), Wigmore Hall (London), Cecília Meirelles Hall in Rio de Janeiro, and the Concertgebouw in Amsterdam. He has also performed alongside internationally renowned musicians such as Maria João Pires, Emmanuele Baldini, Gérard Caussé, Pierre Fournier, János Starker, Thomas Friedli, Albor Rosenfeld, and with ensembles such as the St. Petersburg Quartet and the Jacques Thibaud Trio.

== Teaching and doctorate ==
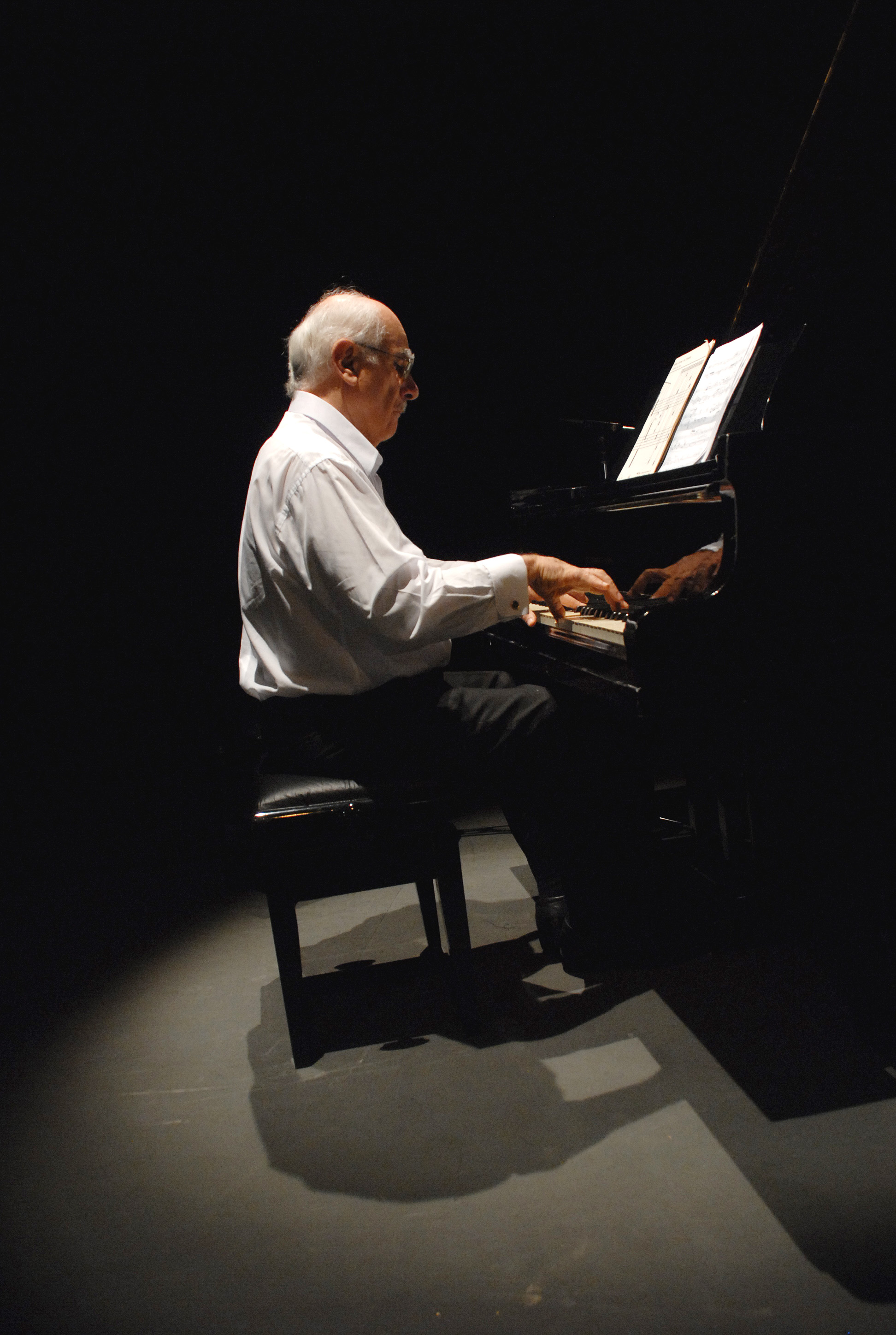
Caio Pagano e Paulo Chagas - Campinas 13.09.2008

He began his teaching career in 1963 at the PróArte Music Seminars in São Paulo, and in 1970 he became a professor at the Music Department of ECA-USP, where he created the International Music Biennial in 1974. In 1981, he moved to the United States to pursue a Doctorate in Music at the Catholic University of America, a degree he obtained in 1984. That same year, he became a visiting professor at Texas Christian University and in 1986, he joined the faculty of Arizona State University, where he currently holds the distinguished rank of Regents' Professor in the School of Music. In Portugal he has also served as the artistic director of the Belgais Center for the Arts from 2001 to 2002, Piano Studies Coordinator at the Polytechnic Institute of Castelo Branco (2002–2010), and a collaborator on special projects with the Ministry of Culture (2003–2007). He has taught numerous masterclasses and summer courses, participating in several editions of the Campos do Jordão Festival (1984–1990) and at universities such as the University of Illinois and the University of Iowa.

== Competitions and awards ==
Pagano has served on the juries of numerous international competitions in Portugal, Switzerland, Singapore, Brazil, the United States, and Panama, including the Panama International Piano Competition (2012–2014–2016) and the Steinway Piano Competition in Asia and the United States (2010-2012-2014 and each subsequent year). He is also a member of Doctoral Committees in Portugal, the US, Spain, and Switzerland. Among the awards he has received, the Eldorado Music Award stands out, as he won the second edition of this competition, which had been won by João Carlos Martins the previous year. He has participated in festivals such as the Miami New World Festival, the Washington Inter-American Festival, Montpellier, Tournon, Americano de Grenoble, and Chambéry.

== Recordings and repertoire ==
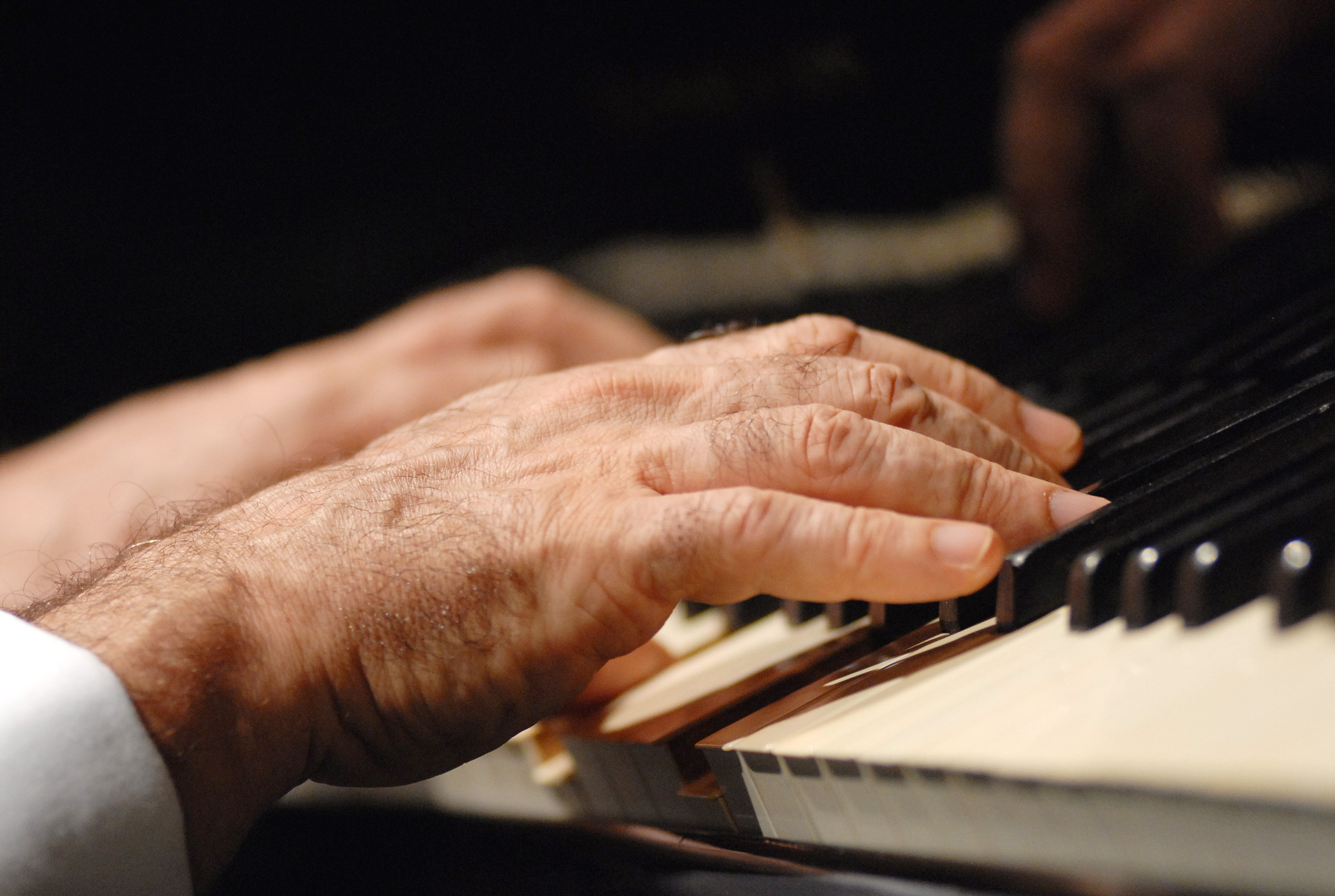
Caio Pagano e Paulo Chagas - Campinas 13.09.2008

His discography includes some 25 titles released on labels such as Summit Records, Soundset, Deutsche Grammophon, and Glissando. Since 1990, he has been a Steinway artist and was honored with the title of Commander of the Order of Ipiranga by the State Government of São Paulo in 1981. His repertoire spans the traditional European canon but he also ventures into less frequently performed works such as Bartók's demanding Piano Concerto No. 2, Alban Berg's Kammerkonzert and Arnold Schoenberg's Piano Concerto. Pagano has also premiered important works by contemporary composers such as Henri Pousseur, José A. R. de Almeida Prado, Gilberto Mendes, Paulo Chagas, Willy Corrêa de Oliveira, and James DeMars. His stylistic versatility is reflected in his choice of repertoire in each country where he performs, for he has frequently introduced works by Villa-Lobos, Pousseur, Camargo Guarnieri, or Almeida Prado to German audiences. And Brazilian music, which is often regarded as more exotic by international pianists and typically represented by 20th-century nationalist composers like Villa-Lobos or Guarnieri, has frequently taken center stage in Pagano's career.
