= Bidart (surname) =

Bidart is a surname. Notable people with the surname include:

- Beba Bidart (1924–1994), Argentine tango singer, actress and dancer
- Frank Bidart (born 1939), American academic and poet
- Lycia de Biase Bidart (1910–1990), Brazilian pianist, violinist, conductor, music educator and composer
