= Weyand =

Weyand is a surname. Notable people with the surname include:

- Alex Weyand (1891–1982), American football player
- Frederick C. Weyand (1916–2010), American general
- Sabine Weyand (born 1964), German EU official
- Uta Weyand, German pianist
