= Marcos Madrigal =

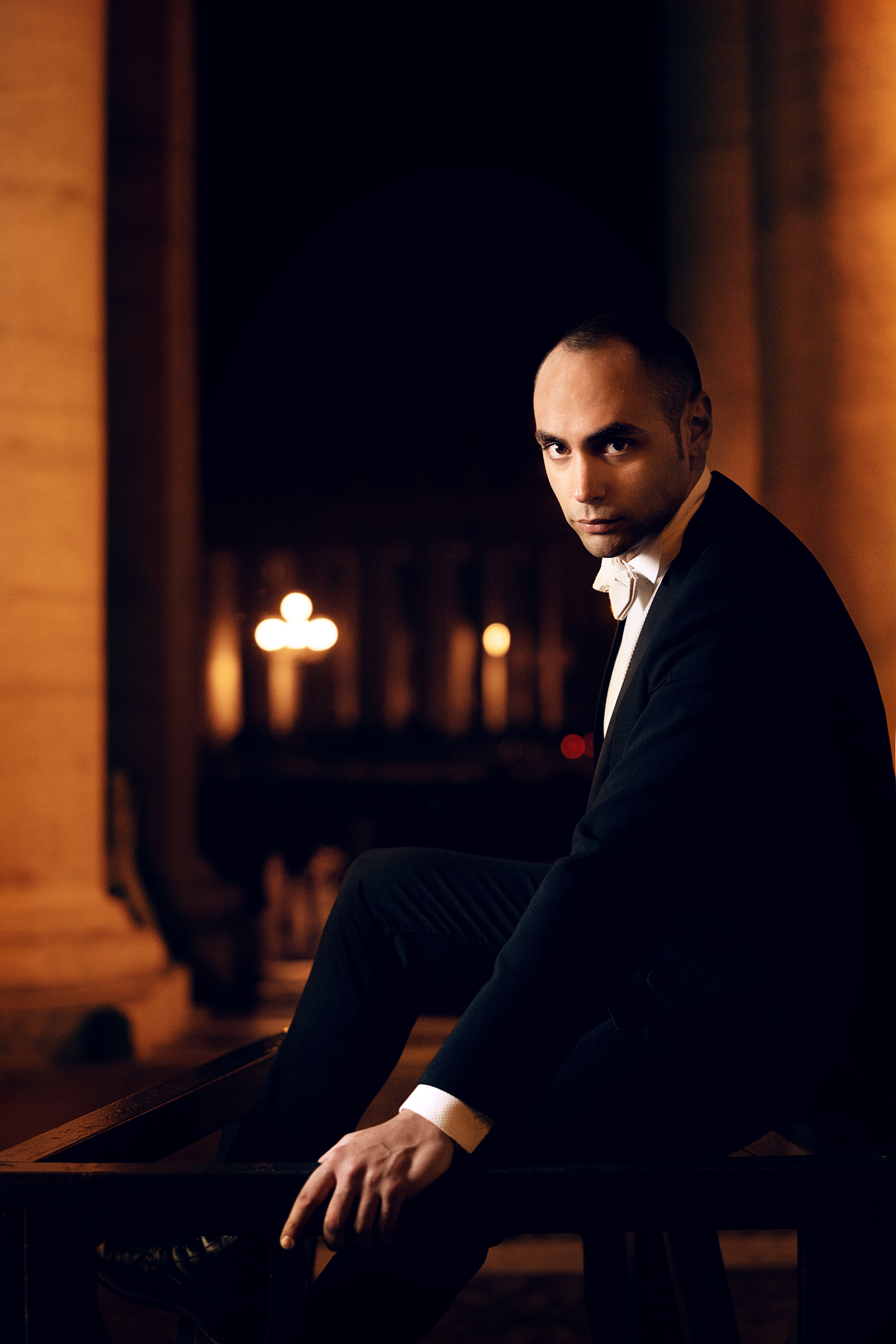

Background information
- Born: January 2, 1984 (age 42); Havana, Cuba
- Genres: Classical
- Occupation: Pianist
- Instrument: Piano

Marcos Madrigal (Havana) is a Cuban pianist.

== Early life and career ==
Marcos Madrigal was three years old when he started studying piano. In 2007, he graduated with honors from the University of Arts of Cuba (ISA) in Havana, under the guidance of the renowned professor and pianist Teresita Junco. He attended Master Classes at the Conservatory of Southern Switzerland in Lugano and at the International Piano Academy Lake Como, where he had the chance to study with Andreas Staier, Dimitri Bashkirov, Fou Ts'ong, John Perry, Malcolm Bilson and especially with his mentor William Grant Naboré.

He has performed in recitals, and as a soloist with orchestra, in many of the most renowned concert halls of the world, such as the Teatro Colón of Buenos Aires, the Auditorium Parco della Musica of Rome, the Queen Elizabeth Hall of London, the National Concert Hall of Dublin, the Auditorium Manuel de Falla of Granada, the Bucharest Opera House, the Volkstheater of Vienna, the Teatro Rossini of Pesaro, the Teatro delle Muse of Ancona, the Teatro Gentile da Fabriano of Fabriano, the Teatro Góngora of Córdoba and the Qintai Grand Theater of Wuhan, working with notable conductors, such as Claudio Abbado, Leo Brouwer, Paul Mann, Enrique Diemecke and Lorenzo Ramos.

He has also collaborated in several projects with Oscar-winning composer Nicola Piovani, as well as with other distinguished composers in the film and theater world.

In 2015, he gave his celebrated debut in the United States at the Finney Hall in Oberlin, Ohio.

Since 2017 he has been the Artistic Director of Habana Clásica, an international classical music festival held in Havana.

== Awards and outreach ==
He has received numerous awards in several international competitions, among which are the International Piano Competition "Premio Jaén" (Spain), the "Panama International Piano Competition" (Panama), the International Piano Competition "María Clara Cullel" (Costa Rica), and the International Piano Competition "Ignacio Cervantes" (Cuba).

In 2012, he was awarded the International Award "Gold Medal Maison des Artistes", granted by the Association for Culture, Arts, Science and Social Commitment at the Sapienza University of Rome.

== Recording career ==
Among his most recent recordings are Homo Ludens, with M° Leo Brouwer; Concert for Four Hands, with Cuban pianist Teresita Junco; the Opera Omnia for Piano and Orchestra of José María Vitier; a monograph dedicated to Cuban composer Ernesto Lecuona, Cuba, which was critically acclaimed and won numerous awards, among which are the Choc de Classica (France), the Melómano de Oro (Spain), the Cubadisco 2016 (Cuba), and the 5 stars of Diapason (France).

Furthermore, he has recorded live concerts and has participated in several programs for many famous Radio and TV channels all over the world, such as the BBC, Vatican Radio, Radiotelevisione svizzera (RSI), Radio Suisse Romande (RSR), and the Italian Rai Radio 3, which in 2013 broadcast a 5-episode documentary dedicated to his life with the title “Piano Libre – The other music of Cuba”.
