= Ángel Sanzo =

Spanish pianist

Ángel Damián Sanzo Herrera (born in Antequera, 1973) is a Spanish pianist. He teaches at Badajoz's Conservatory.

== Awards ==
Record of piano prizes, incomplete
Year	Competition	Prize	1st prize winner	Ex-aequo with...
1998	(Spain) III Frechilla-Zuloaga, Valladolid	1st prize		
2000	(Morocco) Lalla Meriem, Meknes	1st prize		
2000	(Spain) XII José Iturbi, Valencia	2nd prize	(Russia) (Israel) Roman Zaslavsky	
2002	(Spain) XI Ciutat de Carlet, Valencia	2nd Prize	(Latvia) Inese Klotina	
2004	(Spain) II Joaquín Rodrigo, Madrid	1st prize		
2007	(Italy) XLV Città di Taranto	1st prize		

== Recordings ==
- Rosa Miranda y Ángel Sanzo (Cambayá Records)
