= Ciutat de Carlet International Piano Competition =

Annual piano competition in Spain

The Ciutat de Carlet International Piano Competition is a piano competition held annually in Carlet, Spain. It was founded as a national competition (1991 to 1996).

== Jurors ==
Juror presidents in bold.

- Miguel Álvarez Argudo (Spain, 1996)
- Brenno Ambrosini (Italy, 2002, 2009)
- Emilio Baró (Spain, 1996)
- Malgorzata Bator-Schreiber (Poland, 1996, 2005, 2009)
- Marisa Blanes (Spain, 2003)
- Adolfo Bueso (Spain, 1992)
- Almudena Cano (Spain, 2002, 2006)
- Reinaldo Cañizares (Ecuador, 1998)
- Madia Cariulo (Italy, 1994, 1998)
- José Vicente Cervera (Spain, 1991)
- **Aldo Ciccolini** (Italy, **1998**)
- Javier Costa (Spain, 2007)
- Philippe Dauzier (France, 2005)
- Nelson Delle-Vigne Fabbri (Argentina/Belgium, 1994–95, 1998–99, 2003)
- Gustavo Díaz-Jerez (Spain, 2003)
- **Galina Eguiazarova** (Russia, **2002, 2006**)
- Miguel Estelrich (Spain, 1995)
- Margarita Fedorova (Russia, 2000)
- Norberto Ferrer (Spain, 2003)
- Julio García Casas (Spain, 1994, 2004)
- **Perfecto García Chornet** (Spain, 1991, **1992, 1993, 1994, 1995, 1996, 1998**, 1999, **2000, 2001**)
- **Hans Graf** (Austria, **1991**)
- Miguel Ángel Herranz (Spain, 1995)
- Bertomeu Jaume (Spain, 1994)
- Yang Liqing (China, 2008)
- Julián López Gimeno (Spain, 1995)
- **Salomon Mikowsky** (USA, 2000, **2003**, 2008)
- Jorge Moltó (Spain, 2002)
- **Mario Monreal** (Spain, **2005**, 2006, **2007, 2008**)
- **Eduardo Montesinos** (Spain, **2009**)
- Marisa Montiel (Spain, 1999)
- Luigi Mostacci (Italy, 1993)
- José Luis Nogués (Spain, 1991–2009)
- Ettore Papadia (Italy, 1998)
- Carmen Pérez Blanquer (Spain, 1993)
- Enrique Pérez de Guzmán (Spain, 1992)
- **Carmen Piazzini** (Germany, **2004**, 2006)
- Stanislav Pochekin (Russia/Spain, 2001)
- Aurelio Pollice (Italy, 1996)
- Jorge Luis Prats (Cuba, 2007–08)
- Fernando Puchol (Spain, 1992–93)
- Rafael Quero (Spain, 1991)
- Jesús Ángel Rodríguez (Spain, 1991, 1994, 2000, 2005)
- Justo Romero (Spain, 2007, 2009)
- Saya Sanguidoryin (Mongolia, 1999)
- Salvador Seguí (Spain, 2001, 2004)
- Eulalia Solé (Spain, 1993, 2004)
- Alfredo Speranza (Italy, 2001)
- Fernanda Wandschneider (Portugal, 1992)
- Ramzi Yassa (Egypt, 1998)

== Winners ==
Year	1st prize	2nd prize	3rd prize
1993	Miguel Villalba (Catalonia)	Javier Mut (Balearic Islands); J. Manuel Padilla (Andalusia)	not awarded
1994	Jesús Pinillos (Canary Islands)	Carlos Apellániz (Basque Country)	Manuel Carrasco (Andalusia)
1995	Juan F. Lago (Andalusia)	Ricardo Martínez Descalzo (Valencia)	not awarded
1996	Javier Mut (Balearic Islands)	Miriam Gómez (Madrid)	Lluis Rodríguez Salvà (Catalonia)
1998	Gustavo Díaz-Jerez (Spain)	Hisako Kawamura (Japan)	Ricardo Martínez Descalzo (Spain)
1999	Raimon Garriga (Spain)	Theodora Satolia (Greece)	Ricardo Martínez Descalzo (Spain); No Okamura Kyoung Mi (Japan)
2000	Lluis Rodríguez Salvà (Spain)	Natalia Belkova (Russia); Antonio Ortiz Ramírez (Spain)	not awarded
2001	Stanislav Batchkovsky (Russia)	Fedele Antonicelli (Italy); Christian Badian (Argentina)	(Spain) Carlos Rodríguez Martínez
2002	Inese Klotina (Latvia)	Ángel Sanzo (Spain)	Takahiro Mita (Japan)
2003	Sunghoon Hwang (South Korea)	Enrique Bernaldo de Quirós Martín (Spain); Anna Khanina (Russia)	not awarded
2004	Cathal Breslin (Northern Ireland)	Jorge Picó (Spain); Xavier Torres (Spain)	Kayo Ishizuka (Japan)
2005	Kookhee Hong (South Korea)	Carles Marín (Spain)	Yashuangzi Xie (China)
2006	Maxim Anikushin (Russia)	Cosmin Boeru (Romania)	not awarded
2007	Edward Neeman (USA)	Andreas Hering (Germany)	Enrique Bernaldo de Quirós (Spain)
2008	Lilian Akopova (Armenia)	Jonathan Floril (Ecuador)	Xavier Torres (Spain)
2009	Yuki Nao (Japan)	Yixing Pao (China)	Riyad Nicolas (Syria)
2010	Sanja Bizjak (Serbia)	Enrique Bernaldo de Quirós (Spain)	Ksenia Dyachenko (Russia)

=== Junior categories (1st prize winners) ===
==== Under 21 ====
- 1991 Sergio Sapena (Valencia)
- 1992 Carlos Márquez (Andalusia), Daniel del Pino (Madrid) (ex-a.)
- 1993 Oscar Martín Castro (Andalusia)
- 1994 Penélope Aboli (Asturias)
- 1995 Carmen Yepes (Asturias)
- 1996 Carles Marín (Valencia), Javier Perianes (Andalusia) (ex-a.)
- 1998 Hisako Kawamura (Japan)
- 1999 Alina Pociute (Lithuania)
- 2000 not awarded
- 2001 Monika Quinn (Poland)
- 2002 Luis del Valle (Spain)
- 2003 not awarded
- 2004 Beatrix Klein (Germany)
- 2005 Eduardo Moreno (Spain)
- 2006 not awarded
- 2007 not awarded
- 2008 Claudia Cordero (Spain)
- 2009 Liana Gevorgyan (Russia)
- 2010 José Ramón García (Spain), Francisco Montero (Spain), Daahoud Abdul Salim (Spain) (ex-a.)

==== Under 16 ====
- 1991 Miguel Ángel García Soria (Murcia)
- 1992 Jesús Polonio (Andalusia)
- 1993 Carlos Cortina (Valencia)
- 1994 Pedro Casals (Madrid)
- 1995 P. Manuel González Holgado (Basque Country), J. Ignacio Porras (Madrid) (ex-a.)
- 1996 Borja Miguel Edo (Valencia)
- 1998 Judith Jáuregui (Spain)
- 1999 Peru Fano (Spain)
- 2000 Noelia Fernández Rodiles (Spain)
- 2001 Polina Krymskaya (Russia)
- 2002 Pablo Nicolás Rossi (Brazil)
- 2003 Ricardo Pérez Merino (Spain)
- 2004 not awarded
- 2005 Juan Miguel Moreno (Spain)
- 2006 Isaac Friedhoff (Spain), Andrea Zamora (Spain) (ex-a.)
- 2007 María Ángeles Ayala (Spain), Cristina Naranjo (Spain) (ex-a.)
- 2008 Diego Catalán (Spain)
- 2009 Susana Gómez Vázquez (Spain)
- 2010 Elsa Calderón (Spain)
