= Jingjing Wang =

Chinese classical pianist

Wang Jingjing Chinese: 王晶晶; pinyin: Wáng Jīngjīng; born 1981 in Hefei, Anhui is a pianist born and raised in China.

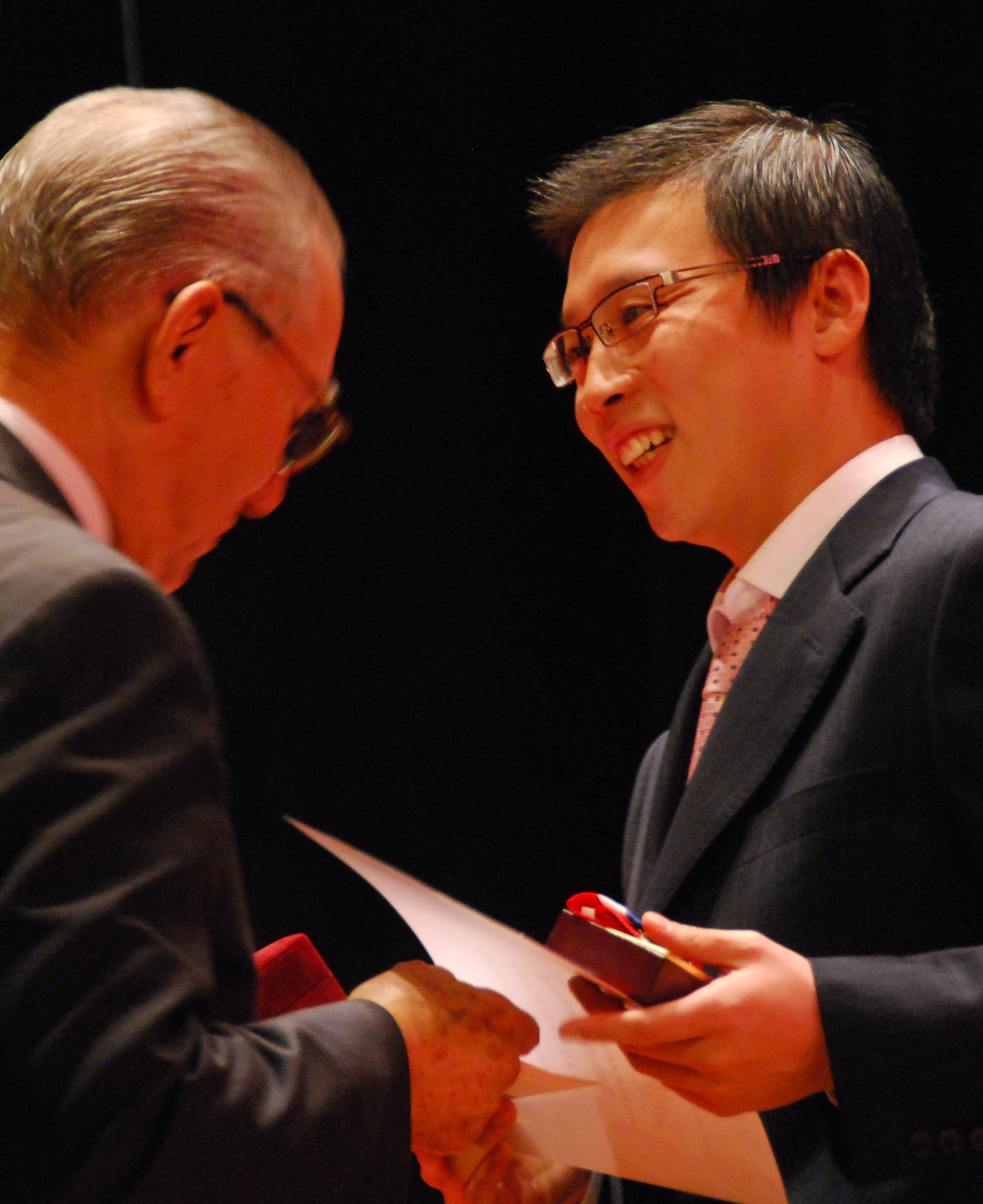
Jingjing Wang accepting his First Prize award at the 2008 Panama International Piano Competition from Jury Chairman Jaime Ingram

== Biography ==
Wang Jingjing started piano at age 10, and began to make a career of it at age 17. A Piano Performance graduate of the Shanghai Conservatory of Music, Wang Jingjing made his concert debut at the age of 18, performing Rachmaninoff's Second Piano Concerto with China Hebei Orchestra in the Shanghai Concert Hall. Since his debut, he has given numerous recitals in the United States, France, Spain, Russia, Italy, the Netherlands, Panama and the Canary Islands as well as his native country. He has collaborated as soloist with France's L'Orchestre Symphonique du Limousin, the China Movie Philharmonic, and the Shanghai Opera Symphony Orchestra. He has performed at the Concert Hall of Tchaikovsky Conservatory in Moscow, Town Hall in New York City, the Teatro Nacional in Panama City, among others.

During July 2006, Wang performed in the XV Festival Internacional de Piano held on the Canary Islands. One month later, he won 3rd prize at the 2nd Panama International Piano Competition. In summer of 2007, as a scholarships receiver in both Mannes International Keyboard Festival and the Music Day Festival in the Netherlands, he attended master classes and given concerts around the Netherlands and the United States.

In March 2008, he was a winner of prestigious Artists International Audition in New York City. In October and November, respectively, Wang won First Prize at the Panama International Piano Competition and Second Prize at the Poulenc International Piano Competition. In March, 2009, he won First Prize the Kankakee Piano Competition and subsequently performed Ravel's Piano Concerto with the Kankakee Valley Symphony Orchestra near Chicago. In April 2009, Wang won Third Prize at the 51st annual Concurso Internacional Premio Jaén, an internationally respected and longest-running piano competition in Spain. In July, 2009, Wang was 3rd Prize winner in the 15th Ricard Viñes Piano Competition. As of 2012, it is evident from the winner lists that Wang is the only Chinese National to have accumulated top prizes at all of these competitions.

In February, 2010, Wang played his South American debut in Bogota, Colombia. This followed a January performance with the National Symphony Orchestra of Panama. In April, 2010, Wang won the University of Illinois Concerto Competition, winning a concerto debut concert in the Krannert Center.

The International Music Foundation welcomed Mr. Wang's debut performance at the Dame Myra Hess Memorial Concerts held in the Chicago Cultural Center in December, 2012.

In addition to his degree from the Shanghai Conservatory, Wang received a master's degree in Piano Performance at the Chicago College of Performing Arts in 2007, studying under Dr. Solomon Mikowsky.
