= Lina Pires de Campos =

Brazilian pianist and composer

Lina Pires de Campos née Del Vecchio (São Paulo, 18 June 1918 – São Paulo, 14 April 2003) was a Brazilian pianist, music educator and composer of both classical and popular music.

== Life ==
Lina Pires de Campos was born in São Paulo, Brazil, the daughter of Italian luthier Angelo Del Vecchio. She studied piano with Ema Lubrano Franco and Léo Peracchi and music theory and composition with Furio Franceschini, Caldeira Filho and Osvaldo Lacerda. Later she studied composition with Camargo Guarnieri.

Pires de Campos worked as assistant to Magda Tagliaferro and in 1964 founded her own piano school. She won awards as a composer including in 1961 the Roquete Pinto medal and the second place composition prize from Radio Mec. Her works have been performed internationally.

== Works ==
Selected works include:

- Improvisação I for flute
- Improvisação II for flute
- Improvisação III for flute
- Ponteio e Toccatina for guitar
- Quatro Prelúdios for guitar
- Confession song (lyrics by Alice Guarnieri)
- Embolada
- I'm Like the Spring
- Fad
- Portrait
- Tune
- You Say He Loves Me

Her works have been recorded and issued on disc, including:

- 1984 25 Years of Composition, (LP)
- 1998 Lina Pires de Campos: Audible Universe Audio CD
