= Rowena Sánchez Arrieta =

Filipino concert pianist (b 1962)

Rowena Sanchez Arrieta (born 1962) is a Filipina pianist.

== Biography ==
At 19, Arrieta won fifth place and title of Laureate at the VII Tchaikovsky International Piano Competition in Moscow and special prize for being the “youngest and most promising contestant” among 82 pianists and is the only Filipino to have attained this honor. Subsequently, she won first prize at the 1986 José Iturbi Competition in Valencia, Spain.

The New York Times described her playing as having a "fevered, demonic intensity" and "a gentle, sublime introspection". US Daily News called her a "combination of purity and fire". She has performed in various cities of the former Soviet Union, France, Spain, Germany, Italy, Australia, Hong Kong, United States, and her native Philippines. She played as soloist of the Moscow Radio-TV Orchestra, Orquestaa de Radio Television Espana, Valencia Symphony Orchestra, Manhattan Philharmonia, California Symphony Orchestra, Chicago Symphony Orchestra and the Philippine Philharmonic Orchestra. Her other awards include the Ten Outstanding Women in National Service (Philippines, 1989), Presidential Awards in Performance (Philippines, 1978-1979) and second prize as songwriter/lyricist in the 1979 Metro pop Music Festival (Philippines).
