= International Piano Competition "Ricard Viñes" =

The International Piano Competition "Ricard Viñes" takes part each year in Auditorium Enric Granados in Lleida (Spain).

== Prize winners (Category A) ==
- 1st Competition, 1995
  - 1st prize – Lluís Rodríguez Salvà (Girona Catalunya)
  - 2nd prize – Pierre-Marie Van Caenegem (Almeria Andalucia)
  - 3rd prize – José Menor Martín (Sabadell Catalunya)
- 2nd Competition, 1996
  - 1st prize – José Menor Martín (Sabadell Catalunya)
  - 2nd prize – Ricardo Martínez Descalzo (Alacant Comunitat Valenciana)
  - 3rd prize – Mervin Fernández Piedra (Cuba)
- 3rd Competition, 1997
  - 1st prize – Mariona Vicens Cuyàs (Girona Catalunya)
  - 2nd prize – Pedro Valero Abril (Molina De Segura Múrcia)
  - 3rd prize – Ricardo Martínez Descalzo (Alacant Comunitat Valenciana)
- 4th Competition, 1998
  - 1st prize – Ricardo Martínez Descalzo (Alacant Comunitat Valenciana)
  - 2nd prize – Àlex Maynegre Torra (Barcelona Catalunya)
  - 3rd prize – none
- 5th Competition, 1999
  - 1st prize – Luís Aracama Gardoqui ( Santander Cantabria)
  - 2nd prize – Emílio González Sanz (Burgos Castilla – León)
  - 3rd prize – Gustavo Andrés Peláez (L'hospitalet De Llobregat Catalunya)
- 6th Competition, 2000
  - 1st prize – Emilio González Sanz (Burgos Castilla – León)
  - 2nd prize – Pedro Pardo Bañeres (Lleida Catalunya)
  - 3rd prize – Raimon Garriga Moreno ( Barcelona Catalunya)
- 7th Competition, 2001
  - 1st prize – Carmen Yepes Martín (Míeres Astúrias)
  - 2nd prize – Josu De Solaun Soto (València Comunitat Valenciana)
  - 3rd prize – Àlex Alguacil Ruiz (Barcelona Catalunya)
- 8th Competition, 2002
  - 1st prize – Alex Alguacil Ruiz (Santa Coloma Cataluña)
  - 2nd prize – Jordi Farran Lapeña (Lleida Cataluña)
  - 3rd prize – none
- 9th Competition, 2003
  - 1st prize – Jordi Farran Lapeña – Lleida (Spain)
  - 2nd prize – Enrique Bernaldo De Quirós Martín – Madrid (Spain)
  - 3rd prize – Alfonso Gómez Ruiz De Arcaute – Vitoria-Gasteiz (Spain)
- 10th Competition, 2004
  - 1st prize – Christopher Devine – Wassenaar (Netherlands)
  - 2nd prize – Miguel Angel Castro Martín – Sta Cruz Tenerife (Spain)
  - 3rd prize – José Enrique Bagaria Villazán – Barcelona (Spain)
- 11th Competition, 2005
  - 1st prize – Luís Parés (Italy)
  - 2nd prize – Emmanuelle Swiercz (France)
  - 3rd prize – Natalia Posnova (Russia)
- 12th Competition, 2006
  - 1st prize – none
  - 2nd prize – Enrique De Bernaldo Quirós and Eduardo Fernández Garcia
  - 3rd prize – none
- 13th Competition, 2007
  - 1st prize – Josep García Martínez
  - 2nd prize – Alexander Yakovlev
  - 3rd prize – Carlos Guerrero Bullejos
- 14th Competition, 2008
  - 1st prize – Bruno Vlahek
  - 2nd prize – Olga Kozlova
  - 3rd prize – Enrique Bernaldo De Quirós
- 15th Competition, 2009
  - 1st prize – Eugeny Starodubtsev
  - 2nd prize – Scipione Sangiovanni
  - 3rd prize – Jingjing Wang
- 16th Competition, 2010
  - 1st prize – Daniil Tsvetkov
  - 2nd prize – Aljoša Jurinić
  - 3rd prize – Tatiana Bezmenova
- 17th Competition, 2011
  - 1st prize – Jackie Jaekyung Yoo
  - 2nd prize – Zoltán Fejérvári
  - 3rd prize – Sun-A Park
- 18th Competition, 2012
  - 1st prize – Regina Chernychko
  - 2nd prize – Yuka Beppu
  - 3rd prize – Stephanie Proot
- 19th Competition, 2013
  - 1st prize – Natalia Sokolovskaya
  - 2nd prize – Denis Zhdanov
  - 3rd prize – Kiryl Keduk
- 20th Competition, 2014
  - 1st prize — SHIGENO Tomoka
  - 2nd prize — ZHDANOV Denis
  - 3rd prize — VOLOV Nikita
- 21st Competition, 2015
  - 1st prize — ZIMING Ren
  - 2nd prize — SATO Hiroo
  - 3rd prize — RUMYANTSEV Vladimir
- 22nd Competition, 2016
  - 1st prize — LAPAZ Enrique
  - 2nd prize — IVANOVA Dina
  - 3rd prize — BERNALDO DE QUIRÓS Antonio
- 23rd Competition, 2018
  - 1st Prize — Nikolai KUZNETSOV
  - 2nd Prize — Dmytro CHONI
  - 3rd Prize — Anna DMYTRENKO
