= Władysław Kędra =

Polish pianist

Władysław Kędra (16 September 1918 – 26 September 1968) was a Polish pianist.

Kędra was born in Łódź. He made his debut in 1933, performing Haydn's 11th Concerto and Camille Saint-Saëns's Rapsodie d'Auvergne. He graduated from the Łódź Conservatory in 1937. He took part in the 3rd International Chopin Piano Competition, attracting juror Magda Tagliaferro's attention. He finished his studies in Paris.

During World War II he secretly performed banned Polish music in Warsaw. The precarious circumstances affected Kędra's hands, but he overcame this. Settling back in Łódź after the German capitulation, he took part in the 1946 Concours de Geneve and the IV International Chopin Piano Competition, where he was awarded a 5th prize, which launched his concert career.

In 1957 he settled in Vienna. He made many recordings for Polskie Nagrania Muza and for Eterna Records.

He died in Warsaw from cancer. He was 50 years old.
