= Angelo Arciglione =

Italian pianist

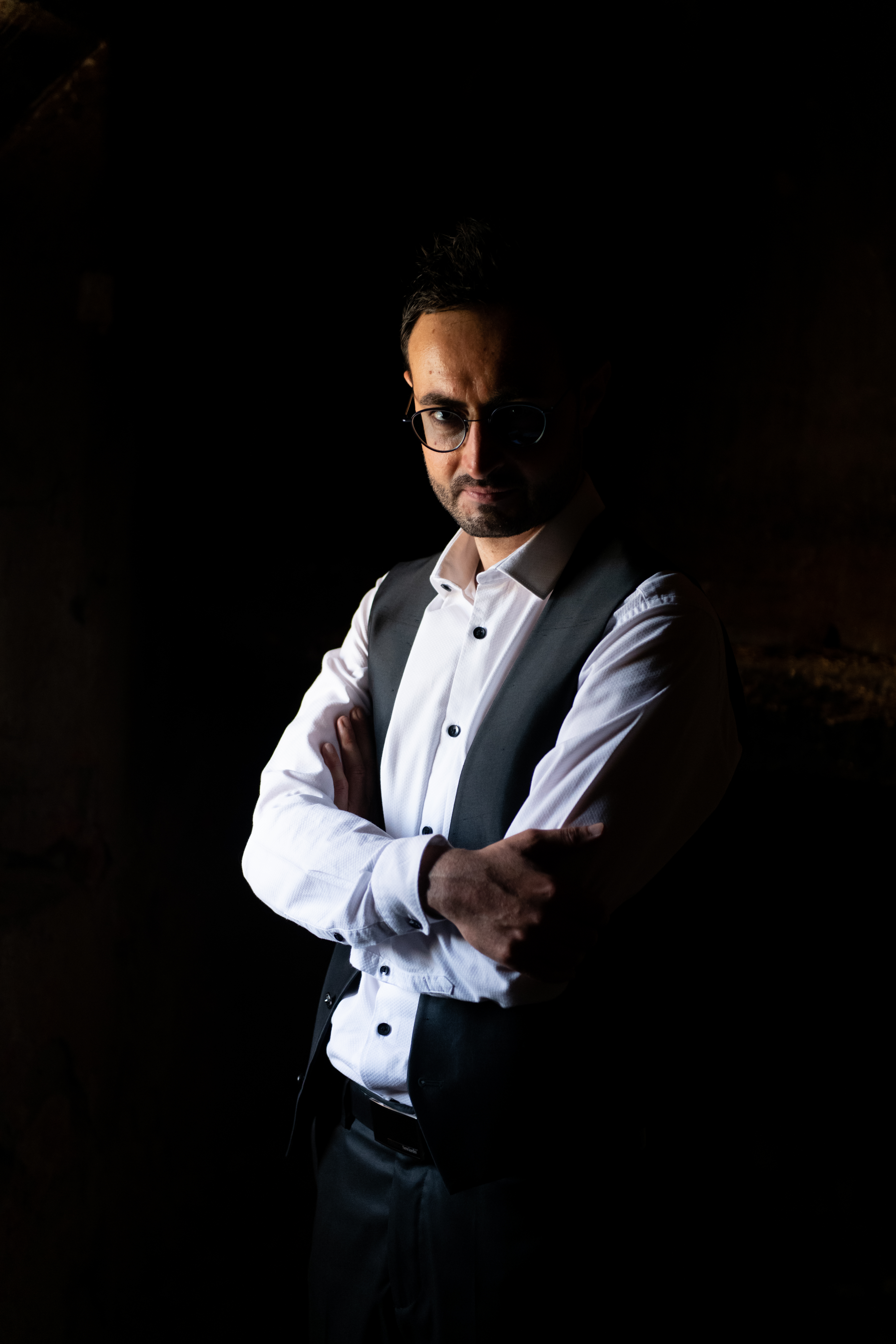
Angelo Arciglione

Angelo Arciglione (born in Acri, 1982) is an Italian pianist.

He studied with Maria Tipo and Eliso Virsaladze at the Scuola di Musica di Fiesole. He also graduated summa cum laude at the Accademia Nazionale di Santa Cecilia in Rome.

Praised by audiences and critics for his sensitive interpretations and refined touch, Arciglione came to international attention by winning major prizes at several international piano competitions, including the 2012 San Marino Competition, the 2012 San Antonio (Texas) Competition, the 2011 World Piano e-Competition of Santa Fe (New Mexico), the 2010 Hilton Head International Piano Competition, the 2010 Scriabin Competition in Grosseto, the 2010 Schumann Prize in Lamporecchio, the 2010 Porrino Competition in Cagliari, the 2008 Valencia International Piano Competition Prize Iturbi, the 2005 International Ettore Pozzoli Piano Competition.

His passion for twentieth century Italian music led him to rediscover and record rare repertoires. He recorded world premieres of unpublished compositions by Mario Castelnuovo-Tedesco, collected in two albums: Exotica (2018) and Dedications (2019), published by Digression Music label. The two albums achieved enthusiastic reviews (American Record Guide, Musicweb International, MusicVoice). He also dedicated himself to the study of rare pages by Giorgio Federico Ghedini, of whom he performed the Fantasy and the Concerto for two pianos and orchestra in 2018 at the Kursal in Kislovodsk (Russia).

He is piano professor at the Music Conservatory of Cosenza. Since 2013, he is the founder and artistic director of the Campus Musica Acri (summer masterclasses & festival), in his home town, in Calabria.
