= Edson Elias =

Edson Elias (Rio de Janeiro, February 11, 1947 – Paris, May 16, 2008) was a Brazilian pianist.

He centered his career in France since he was appointed professor of the Paris' Ecole Normale de Musique Alfred Cortot in 1983 while remaining attached to his homeland's musical life, his 1987 integral of Maurice Ravel's piano œuvre both in São Paulo and Rio de Janeiro being specially long remembered. One year before he accompanied Gundula Janowitz in a South American lieder tournée, and as late as 1999 he performed the Brazilian première of Antonín Dvořák's piano concerto. In addition to his position in the Ecole Normale he was a professor in the Conservatoire National Supérieur de Musique et Danse de Lyon since 2002. He was also active as a teacher in Switzerland, the Geneve Conservatory's Classe de virtuosité having been at his charge for the last fifteen years.

Record of prizes
Year	Competition	City	Prize
1973	Prêmio Rachmaninov	Rio de Janeiro	1st prize
1975	Concorso Pianistico Internazionale Gian B. Viotti	Vercelli	1st prize
1975	Concorso Pianistico Internazionale Salla Gallo	Monza	1st prize
1977	V Internationaler Beethoven Klavierwettbewerb	Vienna	2nd prize
1979	VII Concours Internationale de Piano d'Épinal	Épinal	2nd prize
1981	I Concurso Internacional de Piano José Iturbi	Valencia	2nd prize
