= Christian Beldi =

Romanian pianist

Christian Beldi (born in Bucharest in 1958) is a Romanian pianist. He is a professor at the Cologne University of Music.

Record of piano prizes
Year	Competition	Prize	1st prize winner	Ex-aequo with...
1983	(Italy) Città di Senigallia	1st prize		
1983	(Germany) Tomassoni, Cologne	2nd prize	1st prize void	
1984	(Italy) Alessandro Casagrande, Terni	3rd prize	1st prize void	(Italy) Fabio Bidini
1984	(United States) William Kapell, Maryland	2nd prize	(Canada) Angela Chang	
1984	(Spain) José Iturbi, Valencia	1st prize		
