= Nikolai Kuznetsov (pianist) =

Russian pianist

- Николай Николаевич Кузнецов
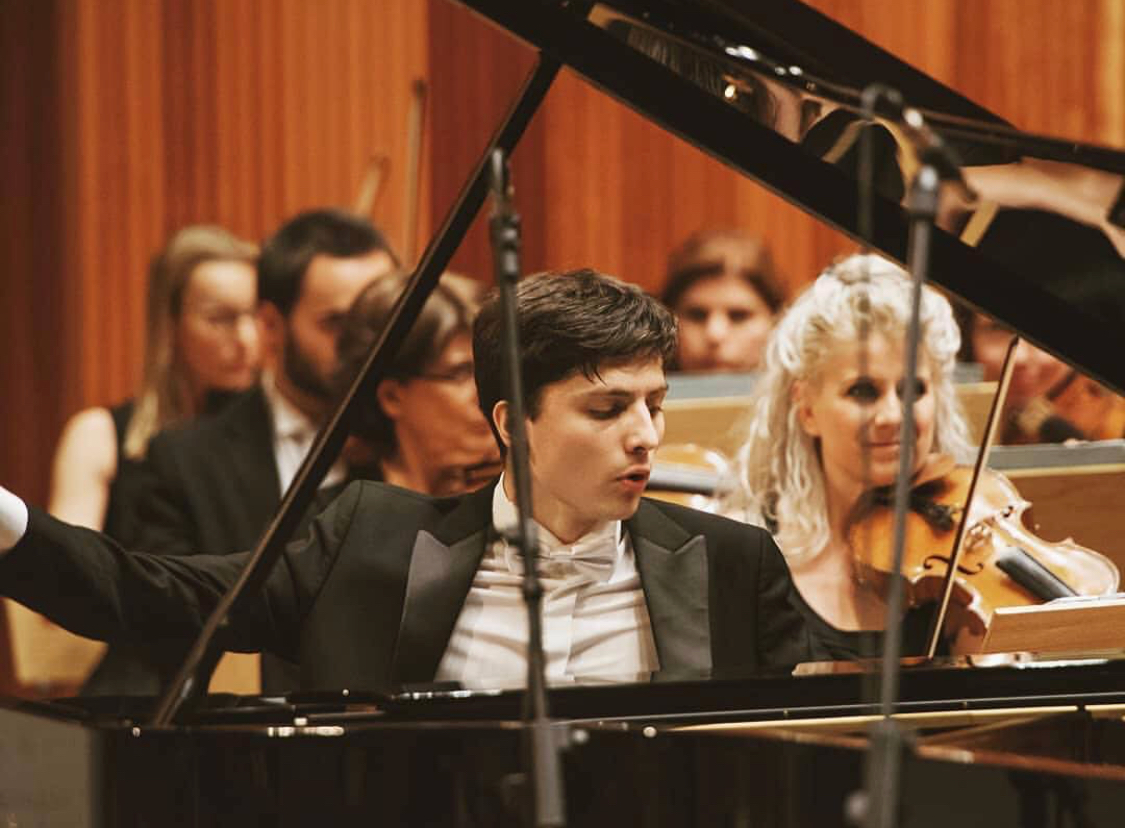
- Nikolai Kuznetsov at the 23rd Ricard Vines International Piano Competition, 2018
- Born: 26 December 1994 (age 31); Moscow, Russia
- Education: Tchaikovsky Moscow State Conservatory
- Occupation: Classical pianist
- Years active: 2004–present
- Awards: 1st Prize at the 23rd International Piano Competition "Ricard Viñes", 2018; Grand Prix at the "Monte-Carlo Piano Masters" in Monaco, 2021
- Website: nikolaikuznetsov.com

Nikolai Nikolaevich Kuznetsov (Russian: Николай Николаевич Кузнецов; also Nikolay Nikolaevich Kuznetsov; born 26 December 1994) is a Russian pianist. He is the winner of the Grand Prix at the "Monte-Carlo Piano Masters 2021", which is held under the patronage of Albert II, Prince of Monaco.

== Biography ==
Nikolai Kuznetsov was born in Moscow on 26 December 1994 in a large family of musicians. When Nikolai was nine, he entered the Gnessin Moscow Special School of Music for gifted children (class T. Shklovskaya) and then attended the Tchaikovsky Moscow State Conservatory (class of prof. Sergei Dorensky), which he graduated with honors in 2021 under professors Nikolai Lugansky and Andrey Pisarev.

During his studies, Nikolai Kuznetsov became a scholarship holder and participant in concert programs of the Vladimir Spivakov International Charity Foundation, Yuri Rozum charitable foundation, the Cultural Development Fund “Return”, the Moscow Public Cultural Foundation, as well as a scholarship holder of the Helena Roerich Charitable Foundation under the program “Support for young talents in the field of science and art” and an active participant in cultural programs of the International center Roerichs. The pianist was awarded the "Future of Russia", also he won a Grant from the PricewaterhouseCoopers.

From a young age, Nikolai was among the winners of such competitions as Panama International Piano Competition in Panama City, Golden Ring of Chopin in Slovenia, Rachmaninov Piano Competition in Frankfurt, "Astana Piano Passion" in Kazakhstan, "Euregio Piano Award" in Germany, Balakirev Piano Competition in Krasnodar, Canada International Artists Piano Competition, International Music Competition "e Muse" in Greece, Viseu International Piano Competition in Portugal, "Yamaha Music Award" in Moscow.

In June 2018 Nikolai Kuznetsov became the winner of the XXIII Ricardo Vines International Piano Competition in Spain, the pianist received the first prize and all the special prizes of the competition. In September 2019, he was awarded the first prize at the International Piano Competition "Wandering Music Stars" in Tel Aviv. The jury of the competition was headed by Israeli pianist Arie Vardi, also included other famous musical figures, professors of the world's leading conservatories: Dmitri Alexeev, Farhad Badalbeyli, Emanuel Krasovsky, Tomer Lev and others. In June 2021, Nikolai received the Grand Prix at the International Piano Competition in Monaco. The jury of the competition was headed by pianist Barry Douglas. The award ceremony took place at the Opéra de Monte-Carlo, where the pianist was awarded the Prize of Prince Rainier III, from the hands of His Highness Albert II, Prince of Monaco. He has collaborated with such orchestras as Monte-Carlo Philharmonic Orchestra, Jerusalem Symphony Orchestra, Dallas Symphony Orchestra, State Academic Symphony Orchestra of the Russian Federation, Mariinsky Theatre Orchestra, Moscow State Symphony Orchestra, State Symphony Capella of Russia, Oman Symphony Orchestra, l'Orchestre Symphonique du CRR de Paris, Academic Symphony Orchestra of the Kharkiv Philharmonic, Ural Philharmonic Orchestra, State Hermitage Orchestra, State Academic Chamber Orchestra of Russia, Symphony Orchestra of the Primorsky Opera and Ballet Theater, Academic Symphony Orchestra of the Samara State Philharmonic. Nikolai has also performed at international music festivals including "Outstanding Pianists of the XXI century" in Bogotá (Colombia), International Music Festival in Kyoto (Japan), International Beethoven Music Festival (Germany), International Piano Festival "Pianissimo" in the Hermitage Museum, Saint Petersburg, (Russia), International Music Festival in Deia (Spain, Mallorca), International Piano Festival in Bucaramanga (Colombia), "Music — our Common Home" in Kharkiv (Ukraine), "European Concerts in Saint Petersburg" (Russia), "Primorsky Key" in Vladivostok (Russia). He took part at the jubilee music marathon dedicated to the 200th anniversary of the birth of Franz Liszt and musical festival dedicated to the 250th anniversary of the birth of Ludwig van Beethoven in Moscow (Great Hall of Conservatory), also he has repeatedly participated in the musical project "Giovani Talenti Russi" in Italy. He has toured with recitals in cities of Russia, Spain, Italy, Estonia, Ukraine, Germany, France, Monaco, Slovenia, Japan, Oman and South American countries.
