= Atsuko Seki =

Japanese pianist (born 1964)

Atsuko Seki (born 1964 in Tokyo) is a Japanese pianist.

Seki received her education at Musashino School of Music, Tokyo (1983–1990). She then continued her education at Music Academy Dortmund. Seki won, ex-aequo with Hideyo Harada, the IV Schubert Competition (1991), and was awarded the IX José Iturbi Competition (1994)'s 3rd prize. She has recorded three CDs.
