= Natalia Sokolovskaya =

Natalia Sokolovskaya Наталья Соколовская
- Born: Natalia Sokolovskaya; 5 June 1989 (age 37); Astrakhan, Russia
- Genres: Instrumental
- Occupation: Pianist
- Years active: 2003–present

Natalia Sokolovskaya (Russian: Наталья Соколовская; born in June, 1989) is a Russian pianist and composer.

== Biography ==
Sokolovskaya, born in Russia, began playing the piano and composing at the age of 3. She studied at the Moscow Conservatory from 2007-13.

Since her first solo recital in 2003, she has given many recitals in the UK, Australia, Germany, Austria, France, Italy, Spain, Czech Republic, Taiwan, Russia and Malta. She has also performed with, among others, CBCO, Sinfónica del Vallès, St-Petersburg State Symphony Orchestra "Classica", Philharmonic Orchestra of Kharkov, Yaroslavl, Astrakhan etc.

She released a 2017 album of Piano Works by Leoš Janáček (OnClassical OC18060C). She also appeared on Guy Bacos's 2017 albums Christmas Variations and Mourning, Elegy, and Others.

She has written her own Paganini Variations.

== Competitions ==
- 2016 - First German Piano Open Competition, Germany - special prize
- 2015 - International Piano Competition "Cidade de Ferrol", Spain - third prize
- 2015 - MozARTe International Piano Competition, Germany - first prize
- 2015 - Nuova Coppa Piano Competition, Osimo, Italy - second prize
- 2014 - María Herrero Piano Competition, Spain - first prize
- 2013 - Ricard Viñes International Piano Competition, Spain - first prize
- 2008 - Camillo Togni Competition, Italy - first prize

Sokolovskaya has won numerous prizes including at the Dudley Yamaha International Piano Competition (UK 2014), Wells (UK) etc. She won a special prize at the First German Piano Open Competition (2016).
