= Panama International Piano Competition =

International piano competition

The Panama International Piano Competition is held at the Teatro Nacional in Panama City every two years. It was established in 2004 by Jaime and Nelly Ingram. The 7th Competition is scheduled to take place in October 2016. Award winners receive cash prizes. Additional special prizes are available for the best performance of one of the first two Sonatas composed by Alberto Ginastera, best performance of a Brazilian composition, and best performance of a work composed by Joaquín Rodrigo.

== Prize winners and jurors ==
Asterisk (*) denotes winner of Audience Choice Award

Year	Prize	Winner	Country	Jurors
2004	1st	Yung Wook Yoo	South Korea	Jaime Ingram (Chairman of the Jury); Efraín Paesky; Roger Woodward; Frank Fernández; Fernando Puchol; Solomon Mikowsky; Sequeira Costa; Sergei Dorensky
2004	2nd	Tatjana Mitchko*	Russia	Jaime Ingram (Chairman of the Jury); Efraín Paesky; Roger Woodward; Frank Fernández; Fernando Puchol; Solomon Mikowsky; Sequeira Costa; Sergei Dorensky
2004	3rd	Alexander Moutouzkine	Russia	Jaime Ingram (Chairman of the Jury); Efraín Paesky; Roger Woodward; Frank Fernández; Fernando Puchol; Solomon Mikowsky; Sequeira Costa; Sergei Dorensky
2004	4th	Inesa Sinkevych	Israel	Jaime Ingram (Chairman of the Jury); Efraín Paesky; Roger Woodward; Frank Fernández; Fernando Puchol; Solomon Mikowsky; Sequeira Costa; Sergei Dorensky
2004	5th	Eduardo Fernández	Spain	Jaime Ingram (Chairman of the Jury); Efraín Paesky; Roger Woodward; Frank Fernández; Fernando Puchol; Solomon Mikowsky; Sequeira Costa; Sergei Dorensky
2004	6th	Amir Tebenikhin	Kazakhstan	Jaime Ingram (Chairman of the Jury); Efraín Paesky; Roger Woodward; Frank Fernández; Fernando Puchol; Solomon Mikowsky; Sequeira Costa; Sergei Dorensky
2006	1st	Mario Alonso Herrero	Spain	Jaime Ingram (Chairman of the Jury); Akiko Ebi; Carmen Graf-Adnet; Leonid Kuzmin; Miguel Proença; Joaquín Soriano; Blanca Uribe; Ralph Votapek
2006	2nd	Kookhee Hong*	South Korea	Jaime Ingram (Chairman of the Jury); Akiko Ebi; Carmen Graf-Adnet; Leonid Kuzmin; Miguel Proença; Joaquín Soriano; Blanca Uribe; Ralph Votapek
2006	3rd	Jingjing Wang	China	Jaime Ingram (Chairman of the Jury); Akiko Ebi; Carmen Graf-Adnet; Leonid Kuzmin; Miguel Proença; Joaquín Soriano; Blanca Uribe; Ralph Votapek
2006	4th	Marcos Madrigal	Cuba	Jaime Ingram (Chairman of the Jury); Akiko Ebi; Carmen Graf-Adnet; Leonid Kuzmin; Miguel Proença; Joaquín Soriano; Blanca Uribe; Ralph Votapek
2006	5th	Anna Khanina	Russia	Jaime Ingram (Chairman of the Jury); Akiko Ebi; Carmen Graf-Adnet; Leonid Kuzmin; Miguel Proença; Joaquín Soriano; Blanca Uribe; Ralph Votapek
2008	1st	Jingjing Wang	China	Jaime Ingram (Chairman of the Jury); Andreas Bach; Sequeira Costa; Aquiles Delle Vigne; Natalia Mitchailidou; Ramzi Yassa; Leslie Wright
2008	2nd	Fernando Altamura	Italy	Jaime Ingram (Chairman of the Jury); Andreas Bach; Sequeira Costa; Aquiles Delle Vigne; Natalia Mitchailidou; Ramzi Yassa; Leslie Wright
2008	3rd	Edward Neeman	United States	Jaime Ingram (Chairman of the Jury); Andreas Bach; Sequeira Costa; Aquiles Delle Vigne; Natalia Mitchailidou; Ramzi Yassa; Leslie Wright
2008	4th	Olga Kozlova	Russia	Jaime Ingram (Chairman of the Jury); Andreas Bach; Sequeira Costa; Aquiles Delle Vigne; Natalia Mitchailidou; Ramzi Yassa; Leslie Wright
2008	5th	Carles Marín	Spain	Jaime Ingram (Chairman of the Jury); Andreas Bach; Sequeira Costa; Aquiles Delle Vigne; Natalia Mitchailidou; Ramzi Yassa; Leslie Wright
2008	6th	Chun Chieh Yen	Taiwan	Jaime Ingram (Chairman of the Jury); Andreas Bach; Sequeira Costa; Aquiles Delle Vigne; Natalia Mitchailidou; Ramzi Yassa; Leslie Wright
2008	7th	Oxana Shevchenko*	Kazakhstan	Jaime Ingram (Chairman of the Jury); Andreas Bach; Sequeira Costa; Aquiles Delle Vigne; Natalia Mitchailidou; Ramzi Yassa; Leslie Wright
2008	8th	Jorge Jiménez	Spain	Jaime Ingram (Chairman of the Jury); Andreas Bach; Sequeira Costa; Aquiles Delle Vigne; Natalia Mitchailidou; Ramzi Yassa; Leslie Wright
2010	1st	Alexander Moutouzkine	Russia	Jaime Ingram (Chairman of the Jury); Solomon Mikowsky; Aquiles Delle Vigne; Elías López Sobá; Thomas Mastroianni; Víctor Rodríguez; Warren Thomson; Dan-Wen Wei
2010	2nd	Alexandra Beliakovich	Belarus	Jaime Ingram (Chairman of the Jury); Solomon Mikowsky; Aquiles Delle Vigne; Elías López Sobá; Thomas Mastroianni; Víctor Rodríguez; Warren Thomson; Dan-Wen Wei
2010	3rd	Takafumi Mori	Japan	Jaime Ingram (Chairman of the Jury); Solomon Mikowsky; Aquiles Delle Vigne; Elías López Sobá; Thomas Mastroianni; Víctor Rodríguez; Warren Thomson; Dan-Wen Wei
2010	4th	Anna Kurasawa*	Japan	Jaime Ingram (Chairman of the Jury); Solomon Mikowsky; Aquiles Delle Vigne; Elías López Sobá; Thomas Mastroianni; Víctor Rodríguez; Warren Thomson; Dan-Wen Wei
2010	5th	Robert Buxton	United States	Jaime Ingram (Chairman of the Jury); Solomon Mikowsky; Aquiles Delle Vigne; Elías López Sobá; Thomas Mastroianni; Víctor Rodríguez; Warren Thomson; Dan-Wen Wei
2012	1st	not awarded		Jaime Ingram (Chairman of the Jury); Ann Schein; Caio Pagano; Artur Pizarro; Fernando Puchol; Luis Ascot; Olivier Gardon; Luis Troetsch
2012	2nd	Marianna Prjevalskaya*	Spain	Jaime Ingram (Chairman of the Jury); Ann Schein; Caio Pagano; Artur Pizarro; Fernando Puchol; Luis Ascot; Olivier Gardon; Luis Troetsch
2012	3rd	Jina Seo	South Korea	Jaime Ingram (Chairman of the Jury); Ann Schein; Caio Pagano; Artur Pizarro; Fernando Puchol; Luis Ascot; Olivier Gardon; Luis Troetsch
2012	4th	Fernando Cruz	Spain	Jaime Ingram (Chairman of the Jury); Ann Schein; Caio Pagano; Artur Pizarro; Fernando Puchol; Luis Ascot; Olivier Gardon; Luis Troetsch
2012	5th	Yuki Ishimaru	Japan	Jaime Ingram (Chairman of the Jury); Ann Schein; Caio Pagano; Artur Pizarro; Fernando Puchol; Luis Ascot; Olivier Gardon; Luis Troetsch
2014	1st	Kho Woon Kim	South Korea	Jaime Ingram (Chairman of the Jury); Mamiko Suda; Luis Ascot; Caio Pagano; Claudio Vásquez; Harold Martina; Solomon Mikowsky; Fernando Puchol
2014	2nd	Marcos Madrigal*	Cuba	Jaime Ingram (Chairman of the Jury); Mamiko Suda; Luis Ascot; Caio Pagano; Claudio Vásquez; Harold Martina; Solomon Mikowsky; Fernando Puchol
2014	3rd	Maiko Ami	Japan	Jaime Ingram (Chairman of the Jury); Mamiko Suda; Luis Ascot; Caio Pagano; Claudio Vásquez; Harold Martina; Solomon Mikowsky; Fernando Puchol
2014	4th	Willanny Darias	Cuba	Jaime Ingram (Chairman of the Jury); Mamiko Suda; Luis Ascot; Caio Pagano; Claudio Vásquez; Harold Martina; Solomon Mikowsky; Fernando Puchol
2014	5th	Marcel Tadokoro	Japan	Jaime Ingram (Chairman of the Jury); Mamiko Suda; Luis Ascot; Caio Pagano; Claudio Vásquez; Harold Martina; Solomon Mikowsky; Fernando Puchol
2016	1st	Jinhyung Park	South Korea	
2016	2nd	Yeon Min Park	South Korea	
2016	3rd	Nikolai Kuznetsov	Russia	
2016	4th	Po Wei Ger	Taiwan	
2016	5th	Armen Sarkisian	United States	
