= Luca Chiantore =

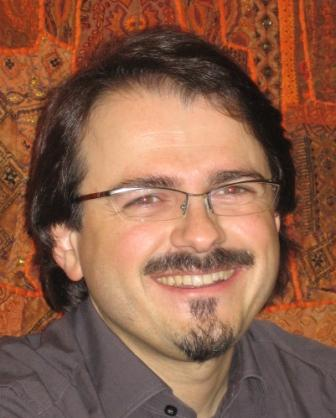

Background information
- Born: 1966 (age 59–60); Milan
- Occupations: Pianist and musicologist
- Website: https://chiantore.com

Luca Chiantore (born 1966) is an Italian pianist and musicologist, based in Catalonia. He has a PhD in Musicology from the Universitat Autònoma de Barcelona; he specializes in the study of piano technique and interpretation and the music of Beethoven.

As a scholar, his most important studies are: Tone Moves: A History of Piano Technique (2019), a revised English version of his Historia de la técnica pianística (2001) (+250 cites on Google Scholar), where he introduces the new term Ur-Technik (21 cites on Google Scholar) as corporal correspondent to Ur-Text, and his thesis Beethoven al piano: Improvisación, composición e investigación sonora en sus ejercicios técnicos (2010) (30 cites on Google Scholar), where he argued that Beethoven might not have been who composed the Füre Elise.

He is very often invited to give lectures at many universities around the world as in the University of California Los Angeles, Universidad de la Rioja, Spain or the Universidade de São Paulo.

Luca Chiantore teaches in the Escola Superior de Música de Catalunya (Barcelona), Universidade de Aveiro (Portugal), Universidad Complutense de Madrid (Spain) and the Escuela Superior de Música Reina Sofia (Spain).

As a pianist, Luca Chiantore has performed, either as soloist or with David Ortolá in the Tropos Ensemble, in many countries as at the Oratorio San Felipe Neri in Cuba, Palacio Rioja in Xile, Auditorio de la Usina del Arte in Buenos Aires, Argentina or the Carnegie Hall in New York, USA

He has been awarded with the Second Prize of the Valencia International Piano Competition Prize Iturbi in 1990.
