= Luka Okros =

Georgian pianist (born 1991)

Luka Okros (born Luka Okrostsvaridze / Georgian: ლუკა ოქროსცვარიძე) was born on 19 March 1991, Tbilisi, Georgia and is now based in London. Georgian concert pianist, published composer and Instagram influencer. Luka Okros has won several major piano awards, including 1st prizes in both Hong Kong International Piano Competition and Valencia Iturbi Prize International Piano Competition. By the age of 26, Luka had performed in over 40 countries. He made his Georgian debut aged just 5 years old and his US debut at age 18 at the Carnegie Hall. Luka's compositions and arrangements are published by Master Music Publications.

== Education ==
Luka Okros graduated with a bachelor's degree at the Tchaikovsky Conservatory under the tutelage of Sergei Dorensky and a master's degree at the Royal College of Music where he studied with Norma Fisher.

== Awards ==
3rd Prize Scottish International Piano Competition	UK, 2017
1st Prize Hannover Chopin International Piano Competition |	Germany, 2017
1st Prize Hong Kong International Piano Competition	China, 2016
1st Prize Norah Sande Award	UK, 2016
1st Prize Morocco Philharmonic International Piano Competition	Morocco, 2016
1st Prize Valencia International Piano Competition "Iturbi Prize"	Spain, 2015
3rd Prize Delia Steinberg International Competition	Spain, 2015
1st Prize Piano Campus International Competition	France, 2015
1st Prize RCM Chappell Medal	UK, 2015
1st Prize Jaques Samuel Intercollegiate Piano Competition	UK, 2014
1st Prize Almaty International Piano Competition	Kazakhstan, 2011
4th Prize Horowitz International Piano Competition	Ukraine, 2010

Luka Okros has been recorded and broadcast numerous times on BBC Radio 3, France Musique, Hong Kong Radio 4 and Georgian Radio 1.

== Compositions ==
For Solo Piano

- Preludes Op. 2 (2015)
  - No. 1
  - No. 2
  - No. 3
  - No. 4
- Intermezzo Op. 3 No. 1 (2018) - Debuted at the Concertgebouw, Amsterdam on 1st June 2019 by Luka Okros
- Nostalgia Op. 3 No. 2 (2020)
- Dream Op. 3 No. 3 (2020)
- Fantasy in F minor

For ensemble

- Piano Trio

Arrangements

- Paliashvili’s Ballet (Lekuri and Mirzaia) from Abesalom & Eteri for Solo Piano
