= Miri Yampolsky =

- Мири Ямпольский
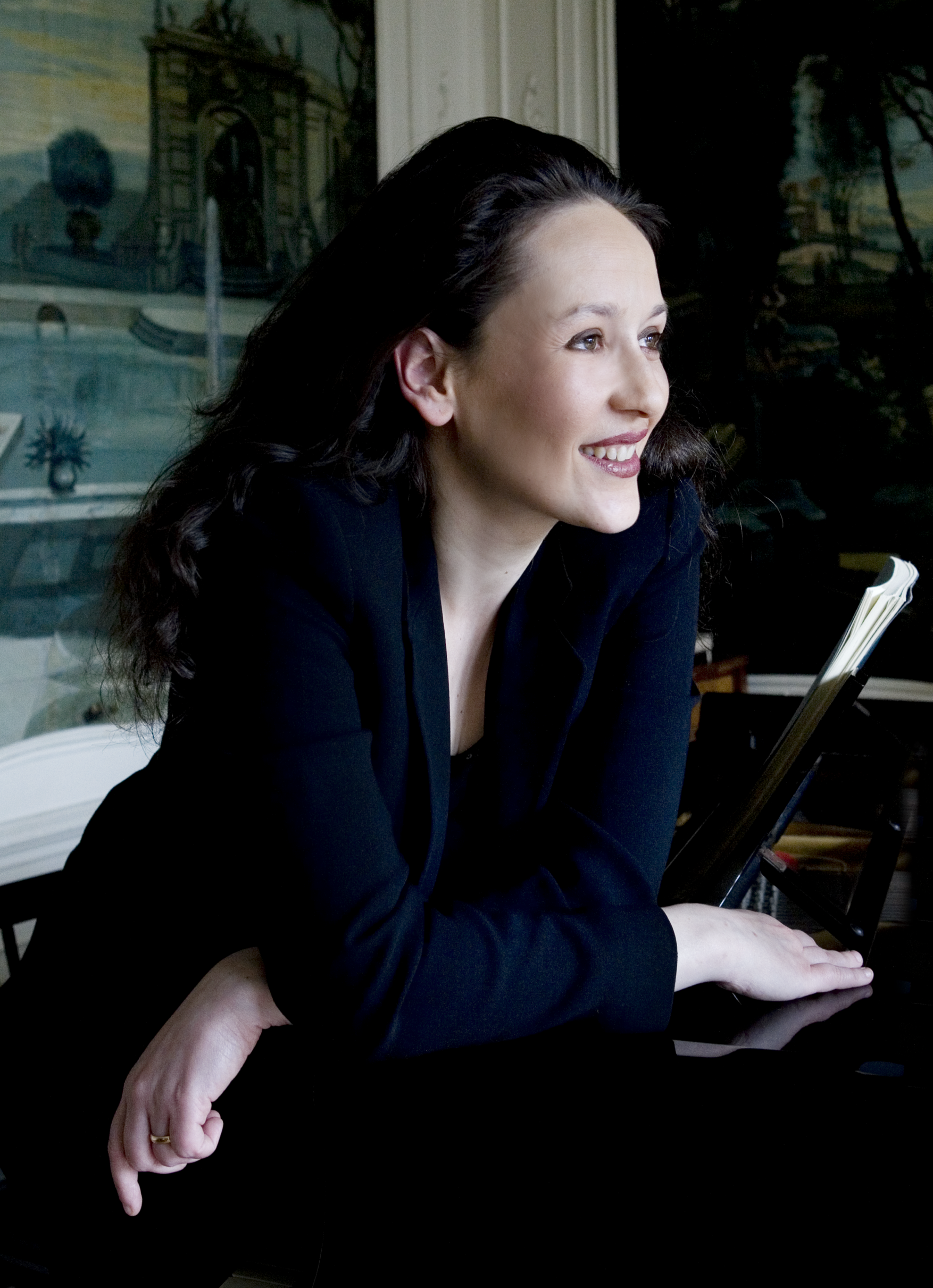
- Occupation: Pianist
- Family: Xak Bjerken (husband)

Miri Yampolsky (Russian: Мири Ямпольский, Hebrew: מירי ימפולסקי) is a Russian pianist and a naturalised Israeli citizen.

In 1994, Yampolsky won the IX José Iturbi Competition. A lecturer at the Cornell University's Department of Music, she has organised a Shostakovich Festival at Ithaca.

Her relatives include pianists Vladimir Yampolsky and Tatiana Yampolsky, and conductor Victor Yampolsky. She is married to Xak Bjerken, and has three children, Misha, Anna, and Maya.
