= Duncan Gifford =

Australian concert pianist (born 1972)

Duncan George Gifford is an Australian-born concert pianist and teacher.

== Early life and education ==
Gifford was born in Sydney. He was educated at Newington College (1985–1990), the Sydney Conservatorium of Music and in Russia at the Moscow Conservatory.

== Career ==
Gifford has performed with orchestras and in recitals throughout Europe, Russia, Japan, Australasia, and in the United States, where he gave his Carnegie Hall debut recital in 1999.

In 1993 he released his first CD featuring the music of Tchaikovsky and Rachmaninoff.

From 1996 Gifford was based in Madrid, where he was professor of piano. He has been a professor of piano at the Conservatory of Palma on the island of Mallorca, Spain, since 2006.

== Recognition and awards ==
Musica Viva described him as a "major artist of his generation". The Sydney Morning Herald described him as "a virtuosic and musically eloquent soloist".

He was the recipient of a David Paul Landa Memorial Scholarship for Pianists sometime before 2004.

=== Piano competitions ===
- In 1989 Gifford was a finalist in the ABC Symphony Australia Young Performers Awards.
- In 1992 he won the 3rd Prize in the Sydney International Piano Competition. He was the highest placed Australian competitor in the history of the competition (this has since been equalled by Daniel Hill, who placed 3rd at the 2004 competition).
- He won 4th Prize in the 1994 Dublin International Piano Competition and 3rd Prize in the 1996 Montreal International Piano Competition.
- He was awarded 1st Prize, and the Beethoven and Chopin Prizes, in the 1998 José Iturbi International Piano Competition in Spain.
- He won 1st Prize in the 1999 Concours Prix Mozart in Lausanne
- He won 1st Prize in the 2000 Maria Callas Grand Prix de Piano in Athens.

=== ARIA Music Awards ===
The ARIA Music Awards is an annual awards ceremony that recognises excellence, innovation, and achievement across all genres of Australian music. They commenced in 1987.

Year	Nominee / work	Award	Result	Ref.
1995	Debussy Preludes Books I & II	Best Classical Album	Nominated	
