= Michigan Philharmonic =

- Orchestra
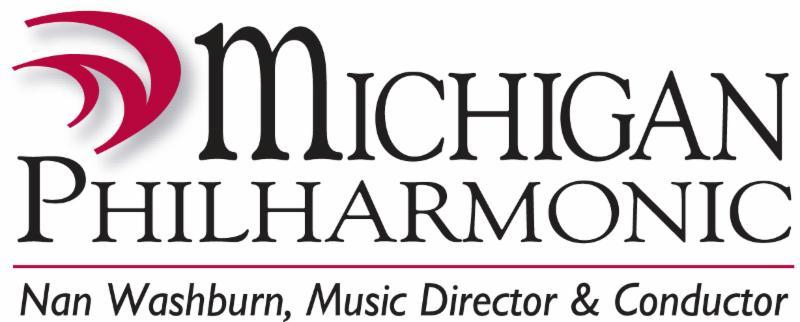
- Founded: 1947
- Location: Plymouth, Michigan
- Music director: Nan Washburn
- Website: www.michiganphil.org

The Michigan Philharmonic (or “Michigan Phil”) is a professional symphony orchestra in Southeast Michigan. The Michigan Phil has grown from a small community orchestra to an award-winning professional regional orchestra serving several Michigan communities, including Plymouth, Canton, Birmingham-Bloomfield, Grosse Pointe, Detroit. Nan Washburn has served as Music Director and Conductor since 1999.

== History ==
The Michigan Philharmonic was established as the Plymouth Symphony in 1945 by local residents Evelyn and Carl Groschke and Paul Wagner, director of the Plymouth High School music program, who were looking to organize a community orchestra. The orchestra began performing in the gym at Plymouth High School and then at Plymouth Colony Farms in the 1950s and before settling at the Plymouth-Salem High School Auditorium where they performed for many years.

In 1998, the orchestra began to shift from the role of a community band to a professional regional orchestra performing more progressive, innovative works with a wider geographic outreach within the Southeast Michigan area. This shift was solidified by the hiring of southern California conductor Nan Washburn after an extensive nationwide search.

Now, with 19 ASCAP awards for adventuresome programming, Nan Washburn also introduced her new and unique programming ideas as well as her dedication to music education. The orchestra naturally began to attract new and better players, because of the opportunity to play more challenging repertoire, as well as an interest in performing contemporary classical works by living composers. To serve the orchestra's educational goals, a program was created in 1998 to bring classical music to 3rd and 4th graders. Under the guidance of Nan Washburn, the program was revised and improved in 2001 and given the name CLASSical Music Outreach. in 2003 Nan Washburn founded the Michigan Philharmonic Youth Orchestra, which she served as art director and conductor of until 2017.

Michigan Philharmonic is dedicated to sharing the music of living composers in order to keep classical music alive and relevant. Every classical concert features music by a contemporary composer.

Living composers whose work has been featured by Michigan Philharmonic:

- Lowell Liebermann: Flute Concerto
- Andre Myers: Changes, Apex of R
- Michael Gilbertson
- Miguel del Águila: The Giant Guitar, Concierto con Brio
- Libby Larsen: Concerto for Saxophone
- Evan Chambers: Watershed
- Chen Yi: The Golden Flute
- Peter Taussig: Concerto for Bagpipe and Orchestra
- Michael Daugherty: Ladder to the Moon
- Lee Actor:
- Alice Gomez: Los Voladros
- Victoria Bond: Bridges
- Rick Robinson: Pork 'n Beans
- Nancy Bloomer Deussen
- Carter Pann: Slalom
- Frank Ticheli: Blue Shades for Orchestra
- Kareem Roustom: Hewar (Dialogue) for Takht & Orchestra
- Jesse Ayers: The Passion of John Brown
- Clarice Assad: The Last Song
- Christopher Cerrone: Recovering
- Max Simoncic
- Laura Karpman: Suite from "Taken"
- Katherine Hoover: Four Winds Flute Concerto
- Jim Beloff: Uke Can't Be Serious
- Judith Shatin: Spin
- Mary Watkins: The Initiate
- Zhou Tian A Thousand Years of Good Prayers
- Ricardo Lorenz
- Wael Binali: Earth, Plunder, Wound, Renewal, Hope
- Whitney George: Quoth The Raven
- David Biedenbender: Their Eyes Are Fireflies
- Kristin Kuster
- Brad Phillips: Unfolding
- Mimi Fox: The 39th Parallel
- Jan Bach: Concerto for Steelpan and Orchestra
- Dianne Hartman: My Child Suite
- Jimmy López: Bellido Avec Swing for Chamber Ensemble
- Dai Wei: Invisible Portals
- Jessica Hunt: The Eagle Tree
- Erik Santos: PAN for Oboe and Orchestra

== Conductors ==
- Nan Washburn (1999–present)
- Russell Reed (1987–1999)
- Leon Gregorian (1986–1987)
- Charles Greenwell (1985–1986)
- Johan van der Merwe (1980–1985)
- Wayne Dunlap (1951–1979)
- Paul Wagner (1945–1950)

== Awards ==
- Ernst Bacon Memorial Award in the Performance of American Music, 2016 – Professional Division.
- Detroit Music Award for Outstanding Community Orchestra – 2018
