= Premio Jaén =

Spanish piano competition

Concurso Internacional de Piano "Premio Jaén"
- Current: 64th Premio Jaén
- Venue: Teatro Infanta Leonor, Jaén, Spain
- First award: 1953; 73 years ago
- Website: premiopiano.dipujaen.es

The Premio Jaén (Jaén Prize) is the longest-running piano competition in Spain. It was established in 1958 and is held in the Andalusian city Jaén. The Competition has been a member of the World Federation of International Music Competitions since 2004.

== Prize Winners ==
| Edition | Year | 1st prize | 2nd prize | 3rd prize |
|---|---|---|---|---|
| 65th | 2024 | (South Korea) Jooyeon Ka | (Bulgaria) Roberto Rúmenov | (China) Deren Wang |
| 64th | 2023 | (South Korea) Jinhyung Park | (Japan) Ryusei Horiuchi | (Serbia) (Hungary) Ivan Basic |
| 63rd | 2022 | (United States) Angel Stanislav Wang | (Italy) Alberto Ferro | (South Korea) Yeon-Min Park |
| 62nd | 2021 | (Russia) Valentin Malinin | (Taiwan) Po-Wei Ger | (United Kingdom) Dominic Doutney |
| 61st | 2019 | (Russia) Alexander Koryakin | (United States) Sun-A Park | (France) Nicolas Bourdoncle |
| 60th | 2018 | (South Korea) Honggi Kim | (South Korea) Jin-Hyeon Lee | (Spain) (Bolivia) Jorge Antonio Nava Vasquez |
| 59th | 2017 | (China) Chun Wang | (Russia) Dmitry Mayboroda | (Germany) Leon Bernsdorf |
| 58th | 2016 | (Ukraine) Alexander Panfilov | (South Korea) Soojin Cha | (Ukraine) Denis Zhdanov |
| 57th | 2015 | (Canada) Anastasia Rizikov | (Russia) Alexey Sychev | (South Korea) Dasul Jung |
| 56th | 2014 | (Japan) Akihiro Sakiya | (Spain) Juan Carlos Fernández-Nieto | (Portugal) João Miguel Xavier |
| 55th | 2013 | not awarded | (Cuba) Marcos Raul Madrigal Soto | (Georgia (country)) Nicholas Namoradze |
| 54th | 2012 | (China) Yutong Sun | (South Korea) Miyeon Lee | (Spain) Michael Davidov |
| 53rd | 2011 | (Spain) (Moldova) Mariana Prjevalskaia | (Russia) Tatiana Dorokhova | (Italy) Viviana Pia Lasaracina |
| 52nd | 2010 | (Serbia) Mladen Colic | (Italy) Scipione Sangiovanni | (South Korea) Jae Kyung Yoo |
| 51st | 2009 | (Ukraine) Antonii Baryshevskyi | (Japan) Shinnosuke Inugai | (China) Jingjing Wang |
| 50th | 2008 | (China) Yun Yi Qin | (Russia) Olga Kozlova | (Serbia) Stefan Ciric |
| 49th | 2007 | (Finland) Uki Lauri Aleksi Ovaskainen | (China) Miao Huang | (Japan) Tomoaki Yoshida |
| 48th | 2006 | (Israel) Inesa Sinkevych | (China) Chenyin Li | (South Korea) Ju-Eun Lee |
| 47th | 2005 | (Russia) Ilya Rashkovskiy | (Russia) Tatiana Chernichka | (Japan) Masataka Takada |
| 46th | 2004 | (Estonia) Irina Zahharenkova | (Italy) Domenico Codispoti | (Ukraine) Mariya Kim |
| 45th | 2003 | not awarded | (Australia) Laura McDonald | (Spain) Daniel del Pino Gil (ex aequo) |
| 45th | 2003 | not awarded | (Australia) Laura McDonald | (Israel) Tali Morgulis (ex aequo) |
| 44th | 2002 | (Russia) Anna Vinnitskaya | (Ukraine) Lilian Akopova | (China) Yaou Xie |
| 43rd | 2001 | (Spain) Javier Perianes Granero | (South Korea) Hwang Sung-Hoon | (Russia) Ilona Timtchenko |
