= Bruno Vlahek =

Croatian-born pianist and composer (born 1986)

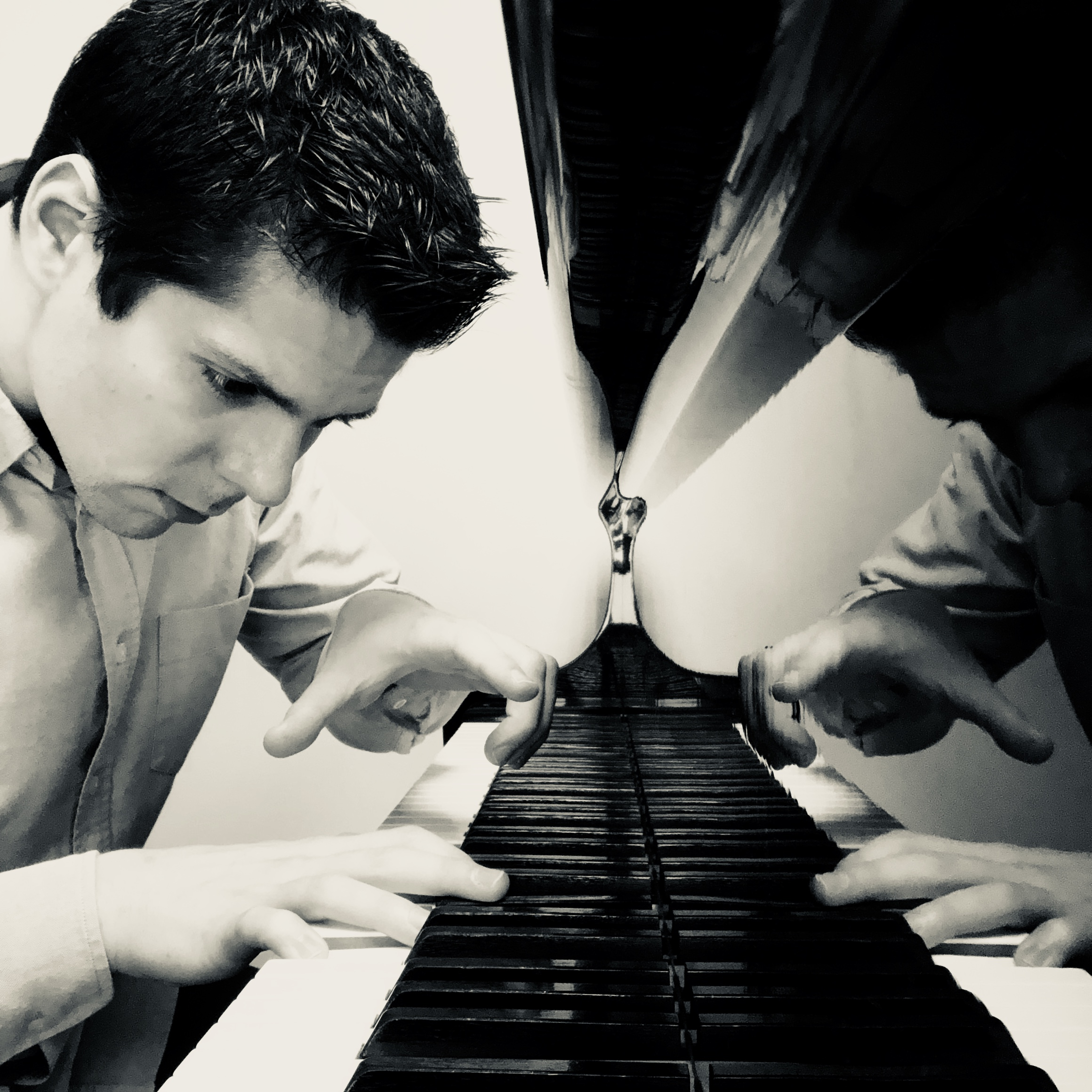
- Born: 11 February 1986 (age 40); Zagreb, Croatia
- Education: University of Zagreb; Lausanne Conservatory; Hochschule für Musik und Tanz Köln; Queen Sofía College of Music
- Occupations: Pianist and composer
- Spouse: Dubravka Vukalović
- Awards: Porin (music award)
- Musical career
- Genres: Classical music
- Website: www.bruno-vlahek.com

Bruno Vlahek (born 11 February 1986 in Zagreb) is a Croatian pianist and composer.

Vlahek started his musical education at the age of nine in his hometown. Immediately recognised as a specially gifted child, he entered the class of Vladimir Krpan and graduated with a degree in piano at the Zagreb Academy of Music as one of the youngest students in the history of this institution. He obtained a soloist diploma at the Conservatoire de Lausanne with Jean-François Antonioli and received a master's degree at the Hochschule für Musik Köln where his teachers were Vassily Lobanov (piano), Tilmann Claus and Johannes Fritsch (composition and improvisation). From 2010 to 2013, he studied with Dmitri Bashkirov at the Reina Sofía School of Music in Madrid.

== Pianist ==
Vlahek's piano playing has been noted for "fantastic virtuosity" and "depth of musical thought that bewitches the audience". The critics have called him a "New Pogorelich". He regularly gives recitals and appears as a soloist with orchestras throughout Europe, in Asia, Africa, South America, Russia and Israel; in the venues such as Palau de la Música Catalana in Barcelona, Franz Liszt Academy in Budapest, Dubai Opera, St Martin-in-the-Fields, National Auditorium of Music in Madrid, Gasteig in Munich, Mozarteum Salzburg, Tel Aviv Museum of Art, Shanghai Concert Hall, Seoul Arts Centre; and at the festivals of Bolzano, Dubrovnik, Vienna, Moscow, Palma de Mallorca, Dar-es-Salaam, Verbier and many others. His performances were broadcast on TV and radio stations such as France Musique, British BBC3, Dutch NPO Radio 4, Catalunya Ràdio, Australian ABC Classic Radio or Radio Suisse Romande, for which he recorded Saint-Saëns' Piano Concerto No. 2 with Orchestre de Chambre de Lausanne. He regularly performs with his wife Dubravka Vukalović as D&B Duo. He also appears as a concert organist.

He is a first prize winner of the international piano competitions “Ricard Viñes” 2008 in Lérida and “Alexander Scriabin” 2010 in Paris, and laureate of the 6th China Shanghai International Piano Competition and Concours International de Piano de Lyon (France), received a title of the Young Musician of The Year 2010 given by Zagreb Philharmonic Orchestra in Croatia, and won prizes such as Swiss Prix Paderewski, Yamaha Foundation's Award in Madrid, Pnina Salzman Memorial Award in Israel and Artists on Globe Award 2014. For his achievements, he was awarded the Honorary Diploma of Her Majesty Queen Sofía of Spain.

== Composer ==
He has composed more than 60 orchestral, chamber, solo and choral works of various genres which have been performed on five continents in cities such as New York City, Chicago, London, Berlin, Amsterdam, Cambridge, Lisbon, Prague, Vienna, Salzburg, Moscow, St. Petersburg, Singapore or Seoul, and at the ISCM's World New Music Days 2010 in Sydney (Australia). In 2012 he won the 1st prize at the XXXIII International competition for organ works "Cristobal Halffter" in Spain. He won the Porin (music award) for the best composition of classical music in 2018 for his Sonata for Clarinet and Piano, and in 2025 for his Acumal for Guitar Trio, as well as Stjepan Šulek Award for the best composition of the year 2019 in Croatia. His works have been published in United Kingdom and USA.

== Discography ==
- Touches - works by Leonard Bernstein, György Ligeti and Igor Stravinsky (Croatia Records)
- Rachmaninoff: Etudes-Tableaux Op. 33 & Op. 39 (PlayClassics)
- Scarlatti: Complete Keyboard Sonatas Vol. 26 (Naxos)
- Ottava alta: Sonatas for violin and piano by Bruno Bjelinski and Stjepan Šulek (Vox primus, with violinist Goran Končar)
- Scaramouche: Piano Duo works by Alfi Kabiljo, Manuel de Falla, Darius Milhaud and Leonard Bernstein (Vox primus, as D&B Duo)

In December 2020, his recording of 22 keyboard sonatas by Domenico Scarlatti was published on Naxos label. Some of those sonatas come from various Italian, Spanish and Portuguese manuscripts and are presented here on the first modern piano recording. The album has been critically acclaimed, while the Belgian classical music magazine Crescendo compared it to those of Christian Zacharias and Vladimir Horowitz.
