= Magda Tagliaferro =

Brazilian pianist (1893–1986)

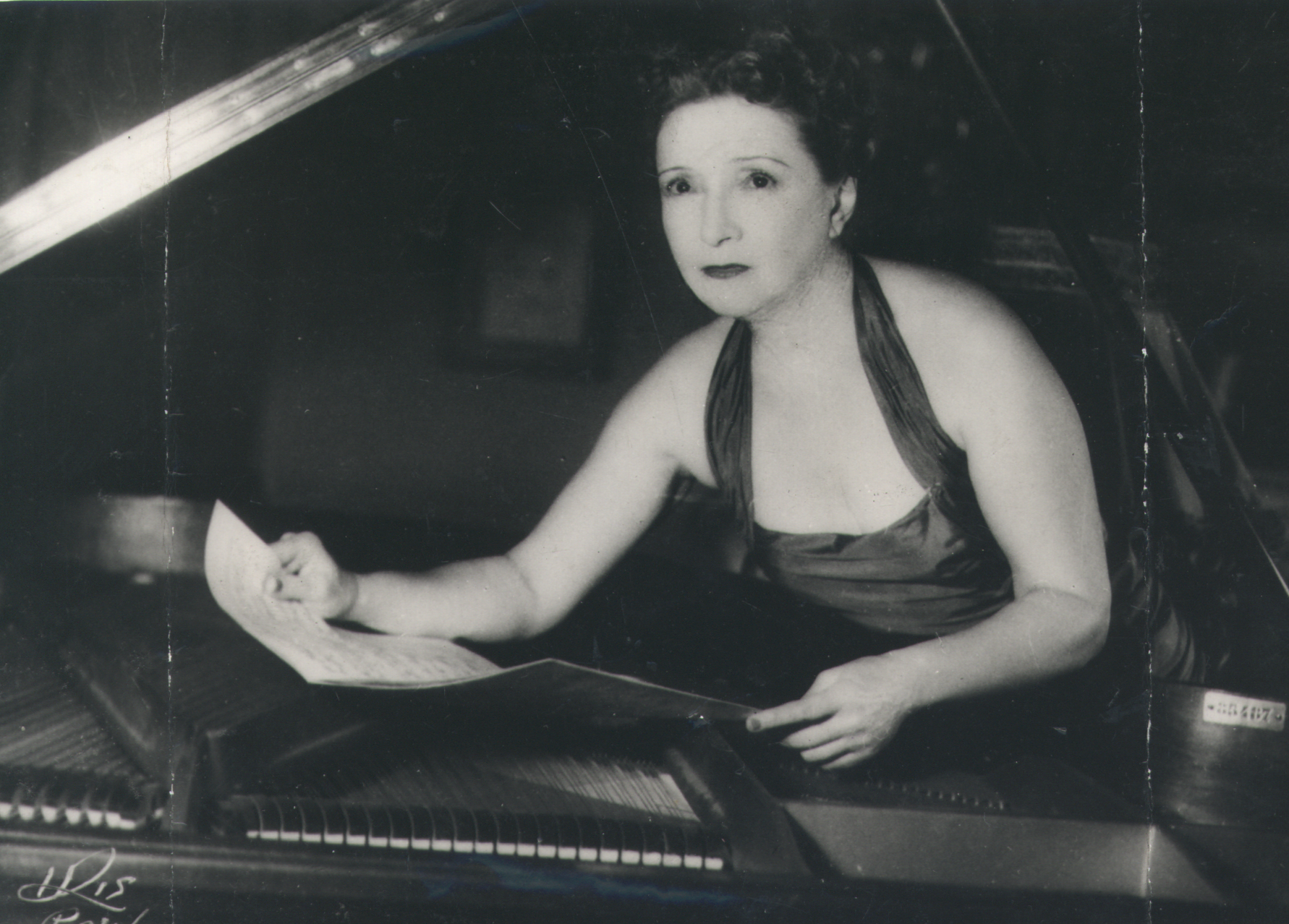
- Magda Tagliaferro, 1955

Background information
- Born: 19 January 1893; Petrópolis, Brazil
- Died: 9 September 1986 (aged 93) Rio de Janeiro, Brazil
- Instrument: Piano

Magdalena Tagliaferro on the cover of Ariel - Musical Culture Magazine

Magdalena Maria Yvonne Tagliaferro (19 January 1893 – 9 September 1986) was a Brazilian pianist.

Magdalena Tagliaferro was born in Petrópolis, Brazil. Her father, who had studied piano with Raoul Pugno in Paris, was a voice and piano professor in São Paulo. He was her first teacher.

The cellist Pablo Casals heard Tagliaferro play in São Paulo when she was eleven, and he encouraged her to study at the Conservatoire de Paris. She went to Paris with her parents. Her father arranged for her to play for Pugno, who was impressed and recommended her to Antonin Marmontel at the Conservatoire. She entered the Conservatoire in 1906 in Marmontel's class and was awarded the Premier Prix (the highest examination award for performance) in 1907. Subsequently, she studied with Alfred Cortot and the two remained friends for the rest of his life. She developed a reputation for striving towards the realization of the musical ideals exemplified by Cortot: a union of "clarity and tenderness, inner strength and emotion and classical balance" in shaping the works being interpreted.

During her studies at the Conservatoire, the director, Gabriel Fauré invited her on a short tour with him. Later, she performed many of his compositions. During her career, her recital engagements took her to the musical centers of more than 30 countries in Europe, Africa, America, and Asia. She was also very active as a soloist, performing with many leading orchestras and performed with many distinguished conductors, including Felix Weingartner, Issay Dobrowen, Pierre Monteux, Wilhelm Furtwängler, Hans Knappertsbusch, Paul Paray, Vincent d'Indy and Désiré-Émile Inghelbrecht. Other solo artists, such as Cortot, Jacques Thibaud, George Enescu, Jules Boucherit and Pablo Casals performed with her in joint recitals. Composers sought her for premieres of their works, sometimes specifically intending that Tagliaferro be the first artist to perform their compositions. She, in turn, applied herself to performing new works by composers such as Reynaldo Hahn, Jean Rivier, Gabriel Pierné and Heitor Villa-Lobos.

Tagliaferro also had a distinguished career as a pedagogue. She taught at the Paris Conservatoire from 1937 to 1939, where Polish pianist Władysław Kędra was among her students, invited by her when she heard him play as she judged the III International Chopin Piano Competition in Warsaw, Poland in March, 1937. She also created her own school in Paris and later in Rio de Janeiro and in São Paulo. She gave numerous masterclasses in many countries and created a piano competition. Her many students included Pnina Salzman, Jeanne Demessieux, Lycia de Biase Bidart, Flavio Varani, Cristina Ortiz, Maria Teresa Naranjo Ochoa, Jorge Luis Prats, Gayle Sharlene Brown, James Tocco and Caio Pagano.

Tagliaferro maintained a capacity for playing into her nineties.

She died of a heart attack in Rio de Janeiro, Brazil, as announced by her agent.

== Selected recordings ==
- “ The Complete 78-rpm solo and concerto recordings”. Works by Fauré, Hahn, Saint-Saëns, Debussy, Mozart, Chopin… recordings, 1928 at 1954). 3 CD APR 2021. Diapason d’or
