= Tristan Pfaff =

French pianist

Tristan Pfaff (born 23 April 1985) is a French pianist, trained at the Conservatoire de Paris under Michel Béroff. He is noted for a Franz Liszt Album on iTunes and may be considered one of the main pianists of his generation.

Palmares
| Year | Competition | Prize | Ex-aequo with... | 1st prize winner | References |
|---|---|---|---|---|---|
| 2002 | (Ukraine) Vladimir Krainev, Kharkiv | 2nd prize | | ? | Scottish IPC |
| 2003 | (France) Arcachon | 1st prize | | | idem |
| 2004 | (Portugal) Vianna da Motta | 7th prize | | not awarded | W.F.I.M.C. |
| 2005 | (Portugal) Porto IPC | 2nd prize | (Latvia) Andrejs Osokins | (Russia) Evgeny Starodubtsev | idem |
| 2007 | (United Kingdom) Scottish IPC, Glasgow | 3rd prize | | (United Kingdom) Tom Poster | Scottish IPC |
| 2007 | (France) Long-Thibaud, Paris | 6th prize | | (Japan) Hibiki Tamura | Concours Long-Thibaud |
| 2008 | (Spain) Cidade de Ferrol | 1st prize | | | El País, November 2008 |
