= International Symphony Orchestra =

Orchestra of Ontario, Canada and Michigan, US

- Orchestra
- Founded: 1957
- Location: Sarnia, Ontario and Port Huron, Michigan
- Concert hall: Imperial Theatre
- Principal conductor: Douglas Bianchi
- Website: theiso.org

The International Symphony Orchestra of Sarnia, Ontario and Port Huron, Michigan began in 1957. The Little Orchestra Society of Sarnia and the Port Huron String Ensemble came together and formed the orchestra. The orchestra is a non-profit, charitable organization and consisted of around fifty-five musicians who are from both sides of the border between the United States and Canada when it was in operation. Many of the musicians work full-time in the music profession. Other members are engineers, teachers, doctors, nurses, and homemakers, and all are well-trained musicians.

From 1997 to 2011, the orchestra's music director was acclaimed Canadian conductor Jerome Summers, who retired in 2011. After Summers's retirement, the orchestra selected Douglas Bianchi of Wayne State University in 2012 as its new music director. The orchestra performed at various venues and churches in the area throughout each season, including the Imperial Oil Center for the Performing Arts in Sarnia and the McMorran Theater in Port Huron.

Imperial Theatre Marquee - 5 May 2012 - Final concert of the 2011–2012 season

== Affiliated organizations ==
In 1984, the Symphony Singers joined forces with the orchestra, and this auditioned chorus remained with the group until the ceasing of operations in 2025. Two auxiliary groups have also supported the organization: the Symphony Association of the Port Huron Area, and the International Symphony Association. It also received support from various sponsors, both private and commercial.

== Notable performers ==
In 2014, harmonica virtuoso Mike Stevens headlined the orchestra's "Classics Cross Country" concert.

== Defunct Operations ==
In November 2024, the orchestra and its executive director, Anthony Wing, parted ways after six years. Just about a year later, the orchestra canceled its 68th season. One former member of the board of directors said that the organization needed better leadership and a better board of directors to go along with a set of dedicated volunteers to return to the orchestra to what it was.

However, the International Symphony Orchestra has put its charitable status in jeopardy because of mismanagement that led to inadequate government filings by the previous leadership. Also, in a clear conflict of interest, the spouse of the music director has assumed the role of executive director. The once successful group reportedly had only $65,000 left, and because of that, had to attempt to sell a piano for $20,000. Whether the piano has been sold or not is not currently known. In addition to the meager assets of the orchestra, the hope that ticket sales might help the orchestra save its season evaporated when only 15% of the tickets for the opening concert of the 68th season had been sold. At this time, it is currently unknown if the orchestra can recover or not.
