= Clarinet Sonata (Vlahek) =

2015 musical composition by Bruno Vlahek

Sonata for Clarinet and Piano, Op. 42 Clarinet Sonata
- Chamber music, Sonata by Bruno Vlahek
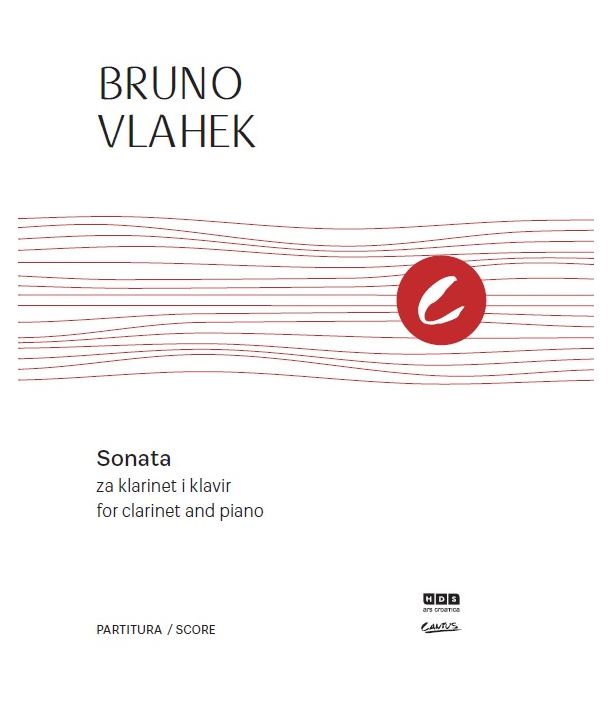
- Catalogue: Opus 42
- Composed: 2015
- Dedication: To Mihael Paar
- Performed: 23 May 2015
- Movements: 3
- Scoring: clarinet, piano

The Sonata for Clarinet and Piano (Clarinet Sonata), Op. 42, for clarinet and piano by Croatian composer Bruno Vlahek dates from 2015. It is dedicated to the clarinetist Mihael Paar, who commissioned the piece and premiered it with pianist Srebrenka Poljak in May 2015, three months after its completion in February same year. According to the composer himself, the process of writing this piece was decidedly unusual – he started with the last movement for which he had a clear vision from the very beginning. This was followed by the second movement based on a theme he had previously been saving for the right piece, and the first movement was created last. It is generally characterized by quirky rhythms combined with lyricism.

The Sonata, marked by an impressionistic character and occasional elements of orientalism, is ultimately distinguished in its final, third movement by refined wit. American musicologist Jane Ellsworth describes it as a stylistically eclectic work, whereby the first movement has a little hint of Hindemith in it, the second movement is developed in a kind of patchwork between folk-like melody and two other therems, one a little Spanish-sounding, the other waltz-like, and the third movement closes the sonata with a catchy tune that ensures an enthusiastic audience response.

== Structure ==
The sonata is in three movements:

1. Moderato
2. Lento meditativo – Tempo di valse
3. Allegro con spirito

The beginning of the Sonata is characterized by opposing elements and ideas, interwoven with uncertainty and indecision but punctuated by definite and powerful piano chords that retain the impression of obscurity and hopelessness.

The following movement is an intermezzo of an elegiac character, representing a suspended time, "a reflection bordering dream with reality, illusion with reality, through melancholic introspection to a reminiscence of memories and questions enveloped in a Spanish or French spirit subtly hinting at a belief in clarity with the final notes.

The Sonata concludes with a harmonious final movement.

== Discography ==
Premiere album by Mihael Paar (Clarinet) and Filip Fak (Piano), released by Cantus.
Croatian Clarinet Legacy album by Marko Zavišić (Clarinet) and Domagoj Guščić (Piano), released by Nota Bene Records.

== Awards ==
The Sonata was awarded by Porin discography award in 2018, as the Best Classical Music Composition.
