= Valencia International Piano Competition Prize Iturbi =

International piano competition in Spain

The Valencia International Piano Competition Prize Iturbi (also referred to as the José Iturbi International Piano Competition) is an international piano competition held in Valencia, Spain. It is named after virtuoso José Iturbi, born in Valencia. Created in 1981, it has been held ever since in the month of September and is part of the World Federation of International Music Competitions.

After four annual editions, in 1986 it became a biennial competition. In 2004 Valencia's Palau de la Música replaced the city's Teatro Principal as the competition's headquarters. In 2013 the competition was changed to a triennial periodicity. The competition consists of five rounds, as shown in the chart below. The prize has always included a cash award, recital and orchestral engagements, and a recording contract. As of 2013, the winner is awarded €18,000 in cash. On two occasions, 1982 and 1992, a First Prize was not awarded.

The Valencia Orchestra takes part in the finals.

== Winners ==
Grand Winners
Year	1st prize	2nd prize	3rd prize
1981	(Poland) Elza Kolodin	(Brazil) Edson Elias	(Turkey) Hüseyin Sermet
1982	Not awarded	Not awarded	(France) Michel Gal
1983	(New Zealand) Patrick O'Byrne	(Soviet Union) Youri Pochtar	(United States) Mary Kathleen Ernst
1984	(Romania) Christian Beldi	Not awarded	Not awarded
1986	(Philippines) Rowena Arrieta	(Japan) Emiko Kumagai	(Japan) Yumiko Urabe
1988	(West Germany) Igor Kamenz	(Italy) Brenno Ambrosini	(Philippines) Jovianney Emmanuel Cruz
1990	(Soviet Union) Aleksey Orlovetsky	(Italy) Luca Chiantore	Not awarded
1992	Not awarded	Not awarded	(Bulgaria) Mariana Gurkova
1994	(Russia) (Israel) Miri Yampolsky	(Cuba) Mauricio Vallina	(Japan) Atsuko Seki
1996	(Germany) Uta Weyand	(Taiwan) Jenny Lin	(South Korea) Jung-Eun Kim
1998	(Australia) Duncan Gifford	Not awarded	Not awarded
2000	(Russia) (Israel) Roman Zaslavsky	(Spain) Ángel Sanzo	(Germany) Sheila Arnold
2002	(Greece) Maria Zisi	(Germany) Severin von Eckardstein (Azerbaijan) Maria Stembolskaya (ex-a.)	Not awarded
2004	(Russia) Alexandre Moutouzkine	(France) Jean-Frédéric Neuburger	(Germany) Ingmar Schwindt
2006	(Spain) Josu de Solaun Soto	(Russia) Valentina Igoshina	(Russia) Andrei Yaroshinsky
2008	(China) Zhengyu Chen	(South Korea) Soyeon Kim	(Russia) (Spain) Marianna Prjevalskaya
2010	(Russia) Andrei Yaroshinsky	(Latvia) Arta Arnicane	(Russia) Aleksey Lebedev
2012	(Japan) Tomoaki Yoshida	(Russia) Ilya Maximov	(Ukraine) Tetiana Shefran
2015	(Georgia (country)) Luka Okros	(Italy) Viviana Lasaracina	(Poland) Aleksandra Jablczynska
2017	(Russia) Fatima Dzusova	(South Korea) Chon Sae-yoon	(Spain) Jorge Nava
2021	Not awarded	(Russia) Alexey Sychev	(Japan) Ryutaro Suzuki (Georgia (country)) Salome Jordania (ex-a.)
