= Uta Weyand =

German pianist

Uta Weyand is a German pianist, who started her concert career in 1989. She is the daughter of a choir conductor and an organist. She studied in Freiburg im Breisgau (Germany), Baltimore (USA) and Madrid (Spain) with Elza Kolodin, Vitaly Margulis, Leon Fleisher and Joaquín Soriano. She has performed with the Barcelona, Madrid, Valencia, Nuremberg and Bamberg orchestras and with the Stuttgart Philharmonic and the National Orchestra of Brazil.

In 2000, she became a professor at Conservatorio Superior de Musica in Madrid, Spain, and, since 2002, she has been teaching at the Madrid Royal Conservatory. In 2007, she founded and is the managing director of the Pianale Piano Academy and Pianale Junior. She created the annual series of concerts in Germany called Schlosskonzerte Osthessen.

== Recognition ==
Weyand won first prize in the Steinway Piano Competition in Berlin and first prize in the José Iturbi Piano Competition in Valencia in 1996. She was selected to be part of the jury for the International Edvard Grieg Piano Competition 2022.
