= Sonata for Clarinet (Cage) =

Sonata for Clarinet is an early work by John Cage, composed in 1933. It is also known under its early title, Sonata for One Voice.

== History ==
The piece was created in 1933 (the first and last movements composed on September 3 and 5, respectively) while Cage was studying music with Richard Buhlig (Nicholls 2002, 63). Buhlig convinced Cage to send the sonata, as well as some other pieces, to Henry Cowell for publication in New Music; thus it became Cage's earliest published piece. Cowell later suggested that the sonata be performed at a New Music Society of California workshop in San Francisco. When Cage arrived, it turned out the clarinetist couldn't play the piece, and Cage had to play it himself, on piano (Nicholls 1990, 176). Cage also tried to get a Los Angeles Philharmonic Orchestra clarinetist to play the sonata, but the clarinetist refused on aesthetic grounds (Kostelanetz 2003, 103). Later in life, Cage made some revisions and the sonata was finally published by Edition Peters, Cage's principal publisher, in 1963. Although he disliked some of his early works, he considered the sonata, according to a late interview, "very interesting" (Duckworth 1999, 8).

== Analysis ==
The sonata is scored for a solo clarinet in B-flat. There are no dynamics, articulation or phrasing indications (Nicholls 1990, 176). Overall, the style is, in the words of Cage scholar James Pritchett, "chromatic, rhythmically complex, and unmetrical" (Pritchett 1993, 7). There are three movements:

1. Vivace
2. Lento
3. Vivace

The first movement is influenced by twelve-tone technique, but is not bound by its formal procedures: there is no row in the strict sense of the word, but the music is based on retrogrades of various melodic and rhythmic fragments. For example, the contents of bars 1–2 is presented in retrograde in bars 20–21, with the same rhythm, and similar symmetries and transformations inform the entire movement (Nicholls 2002, 64).

By contrast, the second movement uses the tone row technique in a much more strict manner, although still only marginally related to Schoenberg's method. It begins with the various forms of the row following one another in close succession: prime (bars 1–5), transposed (bars 5–9), retrograde (bars 10–12). Bars 12–19 are filled with fragments from each of the three used forms, and the movement ends with the retrograde inversion (bars 20–24). The last notes repeat (pitch-wise) the ones from bar 5, where the prime form overlapped with the transposed form (Nicholls 2002, 63–64).

The third movement is an exact pitch retrograde of the first.
