= Lycia de Biase Bidart =

Brazilian pianist, violinist, conductor, music educator and composer

Lycia de Biase Bidart (18 February 1910 – 10 July 1991) was a Brazilian pianist, violinist, conductor, music educator and composer. She was one of the first women to conduct an orchestra in Brazil, leading the Rio de Janeiro Municipal Theater Symphony Orchestra in 1933 and 1934.

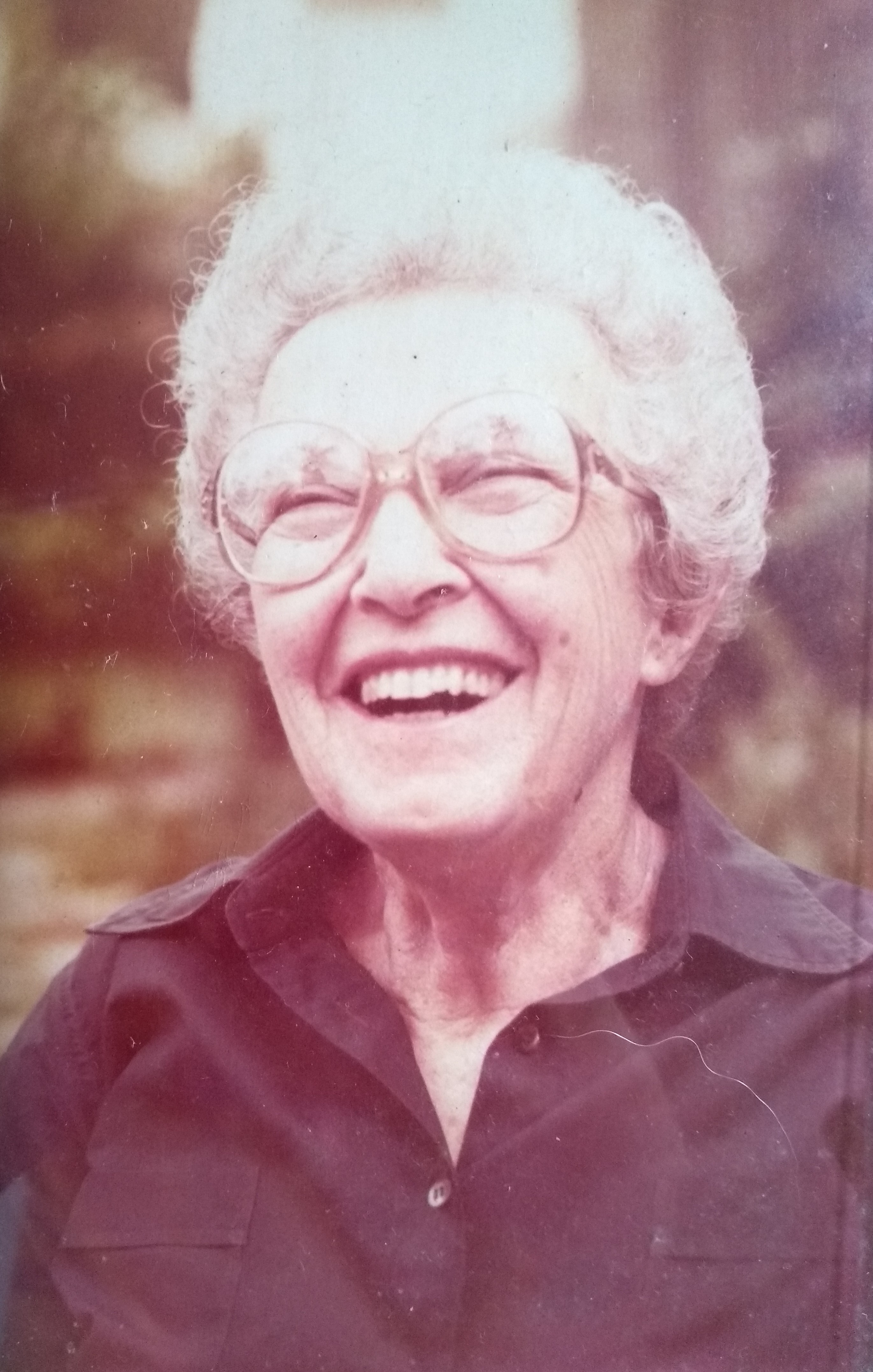
Lycia de Biase Bidart

== Life and career ==
Lycia de Biase was born in Vitoria, Espírito Santo, the daughter of Commander Pietrângelo De Biase, born in Castellucci Superiore, Italy (1884) and Maria Arcângela Vivacqua De Biase, born in Muniz Freire, Espírito Santo. Lycia began her studies in Rio de Janeiro with Neusa Franca for piano and Giovanni Giannetti for harmony and composition, and later continued her studies with Magdalena Tagliaferro.

She married João Baptista Bidart.

== Works ==
Selected works include:

- A noiva do mar, opera, 1939
- Estudos expressionistas for two horns
- Cantos tupis for horn, flute and clarinet, 1975
- Ballet fantasia: simbolismo e vivência do Jardim Botânico do Rio de Janeiro, ballet, 1976
