= Christian Chamorel =

Swiss pianist

Christian Chamorel (born 1979, in Lausanne) is a Swiss pianist.

He was trained at Lausanne, Munich and Zürich's Conservatories, graduating in 2004 and 2006; Chamorel had his recording debut in 2005 with a Franz Liszt monographic; that same year he was prized by Geneva's Societé des Arts.

Chamorel teaches at the Conservatoire de musique de Genève since September 2007.
