= Marianna Prjevalskaya =

Marianna Prjevalskaya (born 1982 in Chişinău) is a Russian concert pianist and a naturalized Spanish citizen, having settled in A Coruña in 1992.

== Education ==
Born to a musical family, Prjevalskaya benefited from early lessons with her mother, Tatianna, her principal mentor for more than eleven years, from age six. She continued her studies at the Royal College of Music in London with Irina Zaritskaya and Kevin Kenner. In 2003, Prjevalskaya moved to the United States where she joined the Toradze Piano Studio at Indiana University. She holds an Artist Diploma and Master of Music from the Yale School of Music, where she studied with Boris Berman, as well as a doctorate in Musical Arts from the Peabody Conservatory of Music at Johns Hopkins University, where she studied under Boris Slutsky.

== Venues ==
As a recitalist, Prjevalskaya performed in the US, Europe, and Japan at venues such as the Mozarteum in Salzburg, the Accademia Santa Cecilia in Rome, the Teatro Goldoni of Florence, the Minato Mirai Hall in Yokohama, the Auditorio Manuel de Falla in Granada, the Palau de la Música in Valencia, the Orpheum Theatre in New Orleans, and Weill Hall and Steinway Hall in New York City. Her debut at Carnegie's Weill Hall with Rachmaninoff's Variations on a Theme by Chopin and the entire Book II of Préludes by Debussy

Prjevalskaya has also appeared at festivals in Europe and the US, such as the Norfolk and Norwich Festival in the UK, the Salzburg Festival, the Festival Russo in Rome, the Bologna Festival, and the Bearcat Piano Festival in Cincinnati. Her performances were broadcast by the Lithuanian, Polish Television, Spanish Television and Radio2 Clásica.

Since her solo debut with orchestra at age nine, Prjevalskaya has appeared with orchestras such as the Cincinnati Symphony Orchestra, the Louisiana Philharmonic Orchestra, the National Lithuanian Symphony Orchestra, the Rzeszow Philharmonic Orchestra, the Korean Symphony Orchestra, the Granada Symphony Orchestra, the Galicia Symphony Orchestra, and the Sendai Philharmonic Orchestra. She has collaborated with conductors such as Ion Marin, Roberto Trevino, Carlos Prieto, David Danzmayr, Stamatia Karampini, Tadeusz Wojciechowski.

== Awards ==
Prjevalskaya's first victory at a piano competition was at the age of fourteen at Marisa Montiel Piano Competition in Linares, a southern town in Spain. Since then, her performances have won her top prizes at over 20 competitions, including the 2014 New Orleans International Piano Competition, the 2013 World Piano Competition in Cincinnati, the 2013 European Piano Competition in Normandy, the 2012 Panama International Piano Competition, the 2011 Jaén International Piano Competition in Spain, the 2010 Sendai International Piano Competition, the 2008 Jose Iturbi International Piano Competition, and the 2007 Paderewski International Piano Competition.

== Albums ==
Her first CD album was released by Naxos in 2012 and features works by Scarlatti, Haydn, Schumann and Zárate, and her second album, dedicated to Rachmaninoff, was released in July 2016 by Fanfare Cincinnati.
