= Tamar Beraia =

Georgian classical pianist

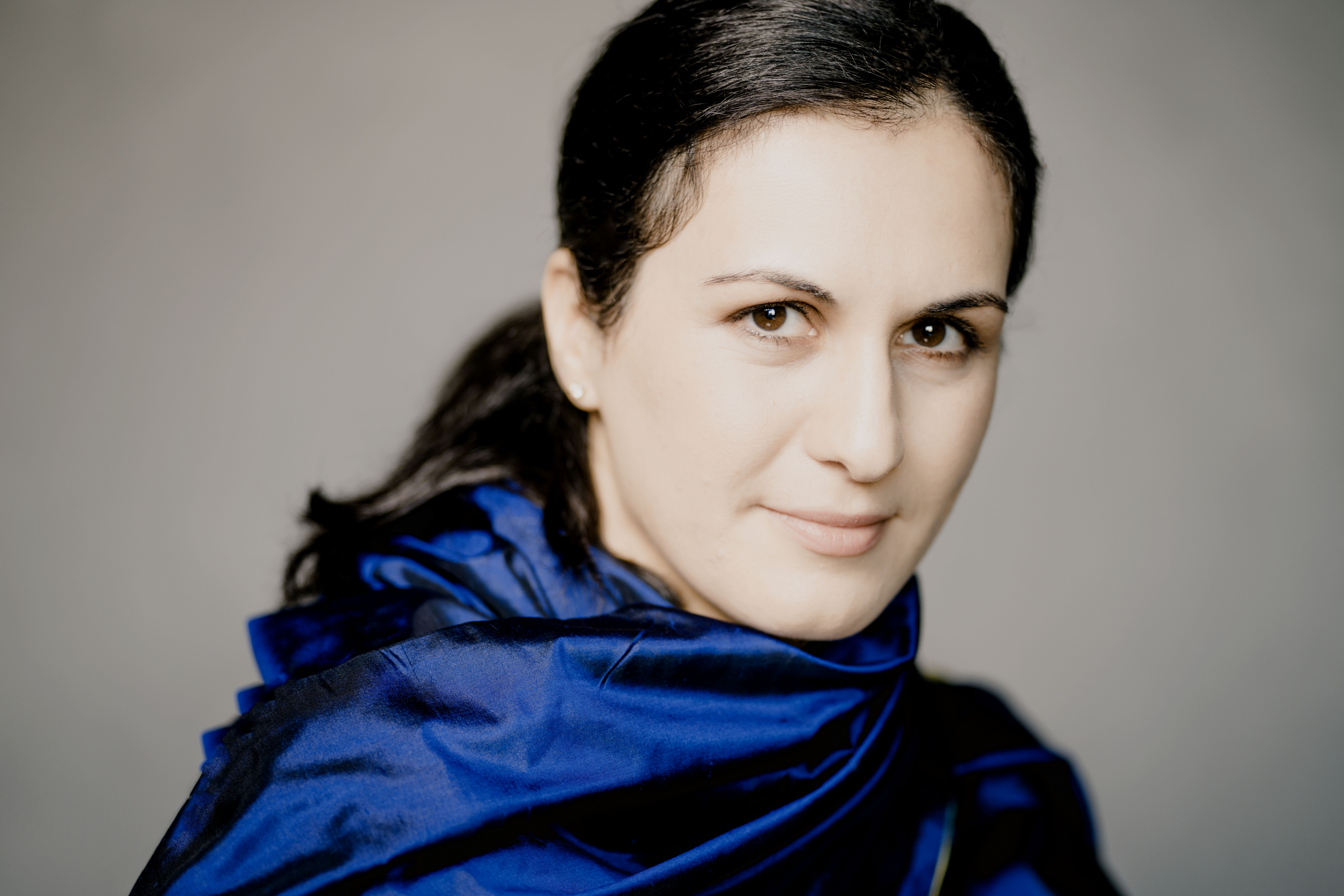
- Beraia in 2017
- Born: თამარ ბერაია 1987 (age 38–39); Georgia
- Education: Vano Sarajishvili Tbilisi State Conservatory, Lucerne University of Applied Sciences and Arts
- Occupation: Classical music pianist

Tamar Beraia (Georgian: თამარ ბერაია, born in 1987) is a Georgian classical music pianist.

== Biography ==
Tamar Beraia was born into a family of musicians and began studying piano at the age of five under her mother’s guidance. She continued her musical education at the Zakaria Paliashvili "Decade of Talents" and later graduated from the Vano Sarajishvili Tbilisi State Conservatory.

She earned her master’s degree from the Lucerne University of Applied Sciences and Arts, where she studied under the distinguished Czech pianist Ivan Klansky.

In 1997, Beraia won first prize at the Vilnius International Competition for Young Pianists and Violinists. · In 2005, she achieved another first-place award at the Tbilisi International Piano Competition.

In 2001, French pianist, composer, and teacher Michel Sogny invited Beraia to attend his master classes at “Villa Schindler” in Austria. She became a regular participant in the master classes organized by Michel Sogny’s SOS Talents Foundation, joining other notable young pianists such as Khatia Buniatishvili and Yana Vasilieva in Austria and Switzerland.

Reflecting on her experience with Michel Sogny, Beraia shared:

Studying with Michel Sogny has always been an inspiring journey. Pianist, composer, writer, philosopher, and teacher — he is a truly unique figure. His teaching method not only guides pianists to technical mastery but also fosters a profound sensitivity to musical phrasing and expression.

Beraia has performed successfully on stages around the world.

In July 2018, she released a CD dedicated to the works of Beethoven and Liszt, marking a significant milestone in her artistic career.

In November 2024, Odradek Records, in collaboration with the SOS Talents Foundation-Michel Sogny, released her latest CD, which features Michel Sogny's musical works. ·
