= Georgia–Kazakhstan relations =

- Georgia: Kazakhstan

Georgia–Kazakhstan relations are the bilateral relations between Georgia and Kazakhstan. Kazakhstan views Georgia as a reliable partner in the South Caucasus, highlighting historical ties and its role in connecting Europe and Asia. Both nations are full members of TRACECA, Baku Initiative, Euro-Atlantic Partnership Council, Partnership for Peace, the Organization for Security and Co-operation in Europe, and the United Nations.

== History ==
Georgia and Kazakhstan established diplomatic relations on 23 July 1992, a year after both nations gained independence from the Soviet Union.

On 29 June 2026, Georgian Prime Minister Irakli Kobakhidze and Kazakh President Kassym-Jomart Tokayev signed a joint statement establishing a strategic partnership to enhance political, economic, transport, and humanitarian cooperation between the two nations. The talks emphasized collaboration in trade, investment, transport, energy, digitalization, and tourism, with Kazakhstan being a significant investor in Georgia. The leaders committed to projects enhancing the Trans-Caspian International Transport Route and highlighted opportunities in digital transformation. Tokayev also awarded Kobakhidze the Order of Friendship for strengthening bilateral ties.

== High-level mutual state visits ==
Guest	Host	Place of visit	Date of visit
(Kazakhstan) President Nursultan Nazarbayev	(Georgia (country)) President Mikheil Saakashvili	Tbilisi	October 2-3, 2005
(Georgia (country)) President Mikheil Saakashvili	(Kazakhstan) President Nursultan Nazarbayev	Astana	March 5-6, 2007
(Georgia (country)) President Giorgi Margvelashvili	(Kazakhstan) President Nursultan Nazarbayev	Astana	June 13, 2017
(Georgia (country)) Prime Minister Irakli Garibashvili	(Kazakhstan) President Kassym-Jomart Tokayev	Astana	July 26-27, 2022
(Georgia (country)) Prime Minister Irakli Kobakhidze	(Kazakhstan) President Kassym-Jomart Tokayev	Astana	February 5-6, 2025
(Georgia (country)) President Mikheil Kavelashvili	(Kazakhstan) President Kassym-Jomart Tokayev	Astana	April 21-24, 2026
(Georgia (country)) Prime Minister Irakli Kobakhidze	(Kazakhstan) President Kassym-Jomart Tokayev	Astana	June 29-30, 2026

== Cooperation ==
On 15 May 2019, Georgia and Kazakhstan signed a memorandum on social and labor cooperation during a meeting between their Prime Ministers, Mamuka Bakhtadze and Askar Mamin. The agreement was signed by Kazakhstan's Labor Minister Berdibek Saparbayev and Georgian Ambassador Zurab Abashidze. It outlined plans for collaboration on legislative exchanges, joint meetings, and events focused on labor, employment, and social protection.

On 22 December 2023, Kazakh Ambassador to Georgia, Malik Murzalin, met with Eliso Bolkvadze, Chairman of the Committee on Culture of Georgia's Parliament. They discussed enhancing cultural and humanitarian ties to foster mutual understanding, particularly through legislative cooperation and joint initiatives. Bolkvadze shared insights from a recent visit to Astana and proposed organizing joint music festivals, including during the Batumi Black Sea Music and Art Festival.

In June 2026, Mariam Kvrivishvili, Georgian Minister of Economy and Sustainable Development, signed memorandums of understanding with Kazakhstan focused on tourism and information technology. The tourism agreement aims to enhance collaboration, develop initiatives, and share expertise to boost tourist flows. The IT agreement targets the digital economy, public digital services, and fostering connections between Georgian and Kazakh startups. Erbol Myrzabosynov and Jaslan Madiyev signed the documents on behalf of Kazakhstan.

== Trade ==
In February 2025, Prime Ministers Irakli Kobakhidze and Olzhas Bektenov met in Astana to discuss enhancing mutual trade and developing the Trans-Caspian International Transport Route. Bektenov emphasized the strong political and economic partnership that has evolved over 30 years, highlighting a growing trend in investment cooperation—$400 million from Georgian investors in Kazakhstan and $620 million from Kazakh investors in Georgia. He expressed commitment to increasing trade relations, focusing on diversifying and expanding the range of products exchanged, including new non-primary goods, despite global supply chain challenges.

On 30 June 2026, Georgia and Kazakhstan decided to strengthen cooperation in trade, investment, energy, transport, and digitalization during a state visit by Prime Minister Kobakhidze to Astana. Prime Minister Bektenov emphasized the strategic partnership between the nations, highlighting the growth of bilateral trade, which reached $184.5 million in 2025. Key discussions included agricultural trade, with a 77% increase noted in 2025, focusing on expanding exports of Georgian agricultural products to Kazakhstan. Both nations aim to strengthen economic ties further, particularly through agricultural initiatives and improved veterinary cooperation.

== Resident diplomatic missions ==
- Georgia has an embassy in Astana.
- Kazakhstan has an embassy in Tbilisi.

== See also ==
- Foreign relations of Georgia
- Foreign relations of Kazakhstan
