= XVII Paloma O'Shea International Piano Competition =

The 17th Paloma O'Shea International Piano Competition took place in the Festival Palace of Santander, Spain from July 27 to August 8, 2012. Twenty pianists from ten countries took part in the competition. For the fifth time the First Prize was not awarded; Ahn Ah-ruem won the Second Prize while Tamar Beraia and János Palojtay shared the Third Prize. Beraia was awarded the Audience Prize.

== Jury ==
(Spain) Antoni Ros Marbà (chairman)
(United Kingdom) Peter Alward (vice-chairman)
(Portugal) Luis Pereira Leal (vice-chairman)
(Italy) Lorenzo Fasolo
(Finland) Ralf Gothóni
(Hungary) Márta Gulyás
(Russia) Elisabeth Leonskaja
(Ukraine) Oleg Maisenberg
(Spain) Tomás Marco
(Hungary) Ferenc Rados
(Switzerland) Gérard Wyss
(Hungary) Jenő Nyári (preselection)
(Spain) Luis Fernando Pérez (preselection)

== Results ==
Contestant	R1	R2	SF	F	Notes
(South Korea) Ahn Ah-ruem				Silver medal	
(Georgia (country)) Tamar Beraia				Bronze medal	Awarded the Audience Prize
(Hungary) János Palojtay				Bronze medal	
(Hungary) Benedek Horváth					
(Italy) Daniele Rinaldo					
(Kazakhstan) Samson Tsoy					
(Russia) Yulia Chaplina					
(Russia) Vladislav Kozhukhin					
(Spain) Marta Liébana					
(Russia) Nadezhda Pisareva					
(China) Song Zihui					
(Russia) Diana Tkachenko					
(United States) Charlie Albright					
(Russia) Polina Bogdanova					
(Finland) Marko Hilpo					
(South Korea) Kim Tae-hyung					
(Russia) Eduard Kiprskiy					
(Cuba) Marcos Madrigal					
(Italy) Scipione Sangiovanni					
(South Korea) Sung Jenna					
