= Charlie Albright =

American pianist and composer

Charlie Albright 찰리 박 올브라이트
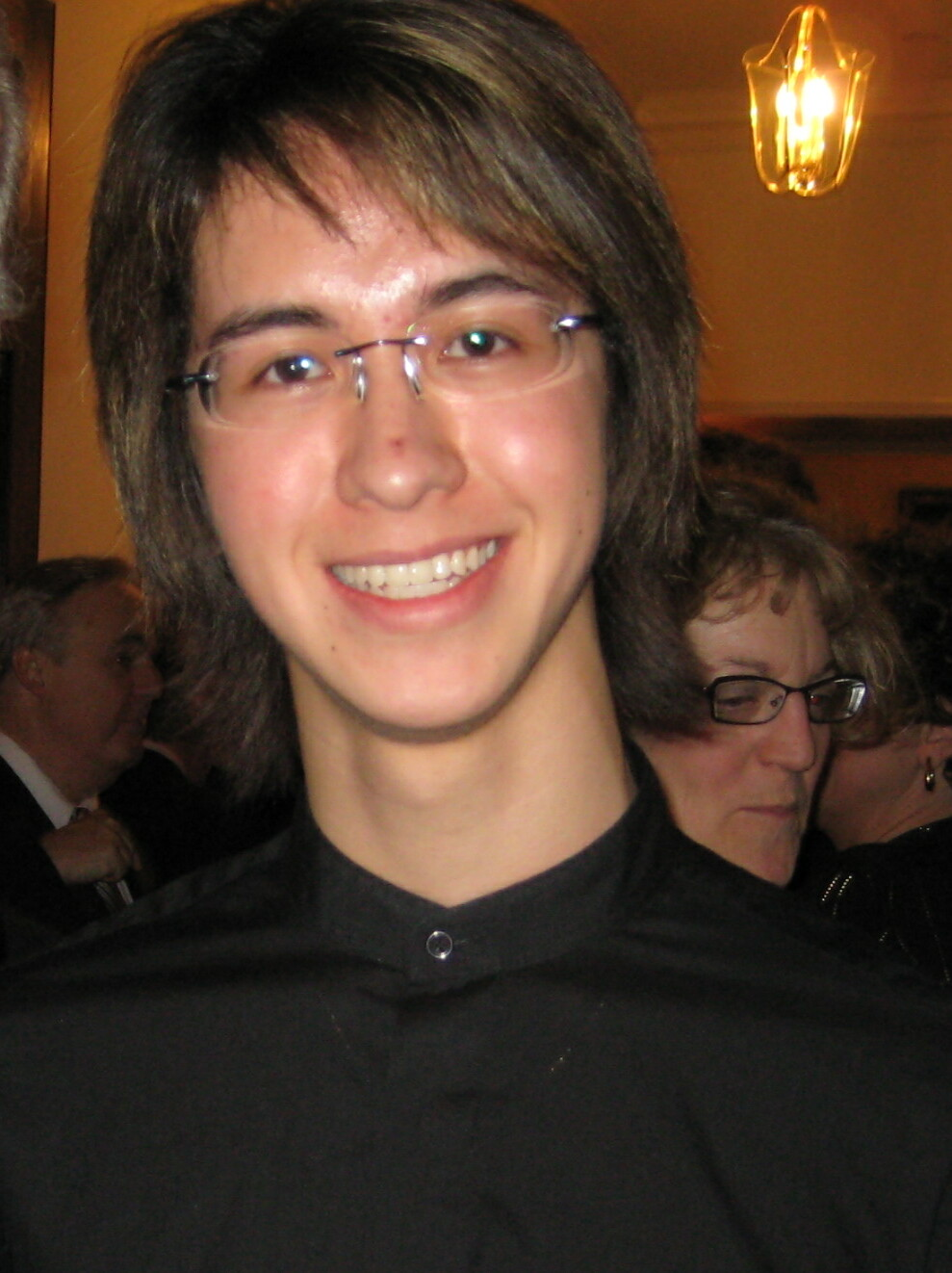
- Charlie Albright in December 2008

Background information
- Born: 1988 or 1989 (age 37–38); Fort Lewis, Washington, U.S.
- Origin: Centralia, Washington
- Genres: Classical, Crossover
- Occupations: Pianist, Composer
- Instrument: Piano
- Years active: 2000–present
- Label: CAPC Music
- Website: http://www.CharlieAlbright.com

Charlie Albright (Korean: 찰리 박 올브라이트; born 1988 or 1989) is an American pianist and composer. He is an official Steinway Artist, 2014 Avery Fisher Career Grant Recipient, 2010 Gilmore Young Artist, former Young Concert Artist, and 2026 Centralia College Distinguished Alumni Award recipient. He graduated from Harvard College (AB) and the New England Conservatory (MM) as the first classical pianist in the schools' five-year AB/MM Joint Program, was named the Leverett House Artist in Residence for 2011–2012, and was one of the 15 Most Interesting Seniors of the Harvard College Class of 2011. He graduated from the Juilliard School of Music with his post-graduate Artist Diploma (AD) in 2014.

Albright is a frequent collaborator with Yo-Yo Ma. Albright lives in Seattle and in New York City.

== Childhood ==
Albright was born in the U.S. Army hospital within Fort Lewis, near Tacoma, Washington. His mother, Hyesoo, was a computer database specialist who was born in Seoul, and his father, Jeff Albright, was a U.S. Navy serviceman; the two married in Korea and then settled in Washington. Albright was born and his family moved to Centralia where he was raised. Albright has a younger sister named Lillian. Albright says he began to play the piano at age three-and-a-half, starting with "Twinkle, Twinkle, Little Star" played by ear. From the age of four he appeared on state and national television. He began formal training in 1996, studying with Nancy Adsit of Olympia, Washington.

During his years with Adsit, Albright was selected five times as an Olympia Chapter representative to the Washington State Music Teachers Convention (WSMTA) and received a Beaux Arts Society scholarship. In 1998, he made his orchestral debut with the University of Puget Sound symphony. In 2000, he won prizes at the Central Washington University Sonatina/Sonata Festival and won the Olympia Chapter Concerto Festival, which led to a guest artist appearance with the Capital Area Youth Symphony in 2001.

Continuing to develop his performance career, Albright performed as part of the "Wonder Kids" concert in the Elsinore Piano Series in Salem, Oregon, in 2001 and performed in a concert with Tanya Stambuk of the University of Puget Sound the following January. Other performances throughout Washington included solo debuts with the Olympia Symphony Orchestra and the Seattle Philharmonic in 2002.

Albright's success continued as a prizewinner in the Northwest Chopin Festival on February 1, 2003, and first prize winner in the 2003 Washington State MTNA Senior Piano Competition. Other concerts that year included appearances on the Steinway Young Artists Series in Seattle, and a guest artist appearance with the Port Angeles Symphony in Port Angeles, Washington.

== High school/early college ==
Albright attended Centralia High School, graduating in 2007. He also attended Centralia College as part of the Running Start Program, earning his Associate of Science degree with highest honors in 2007.

=== 2004 ===
At age 15, Albright was selected as the youngest pianist in the Young Artist program of the 2004 TCU/Cliburn Piano Institute in Fort Worth, Texas. Additionally, he won the Washington State MTNA Senior Piano Competition a second time, the Northwest Division MTNA Senior Piano Competition in Missoula, Montana, and the Olympia Music Teachers Association Concerto Competition.

=== 2005 ===
Albright was among the five winners in his division at the Northwest Chopin Competition held in February 2005. He played in the festival's Prizewinners' Concert at the Community Concerts Series in Centralia, Washington, and a concert with the Northwest Wind Symphony.

Albright was the First Prize winner in the 2005 International Institute for Young Musicians (IIYM) International Piano Competition in Lawrence, Kansas.

=== 2006 ===
Albright won Second Prize in the 2006 Schimmel Senior International Piano Competition in Tempe, Arizona.

In June, he was the first pianist ever to win both the Solo and Ensemble Divisions of the 2006 New York Biennial National Piano Competition in New York, New York.

In August, he won first prize and all other prizes in the 2006 Eastman Young Artists' International Piano Competition at the Eastman School of Music in Rochester, New York. Other prizes included the "Audience Prize," the "Best Performance in a Master Class" prize, and the "Best Performance of a 21st Century Work" prize.

Albright won the 2006 Washington State MTNA Senior Piano Competition for the fourth time, in November. He won in his age group at the Chopin Northwest competition.

Albright gave a concert at the 5-year memorial of the 9/11/01 World Trade Center Attacks at New York's Trinity Church, a concert with the Metropolitan Opera Chamber Ensemble, and other concerts in Washington, D.C. and Massachusetts.

=== 2007 ===
Albright was the youngest participant in the 2007 Hilton Head International Piano Competition held in South Carolina, where he placed third.

== College/graduate school career ==
Albright was the first classical pianist in the Harvard/New England Conservatory 5-Year BA/MM Joint Program, where he received a bachelor's degree in economics and completed a pre-medical curriculum at Harvard College (Class of 2011). He was also simultaneously a Master of Music student in Piano Performance at the New England Conservatory of Music (Class of 2012). He was named the Harvard University Leverett House Artist in Residence for 2011–2012. He also played upwards of 77 concerts worldwide per year while in college. In addition to piano, he pursued his business and finance interests while working on Wall Street.

=== 2008 ===
Albright won the 2007-2008 Harvard Bach Society Orchestra Competition as a freshman and performed the Tchaikovsky Piano Concerto, No. 1 with the group in February 2008.

During the summer, he competed in the 2008 Sydney International Piano Competition in Sydney, Australia, where he finished as a semi-finalist and won the category for playing a Franz Liszt study piece (étude), and was given a prize for the "Best Performance of a 21st Century Work in Stage 1."

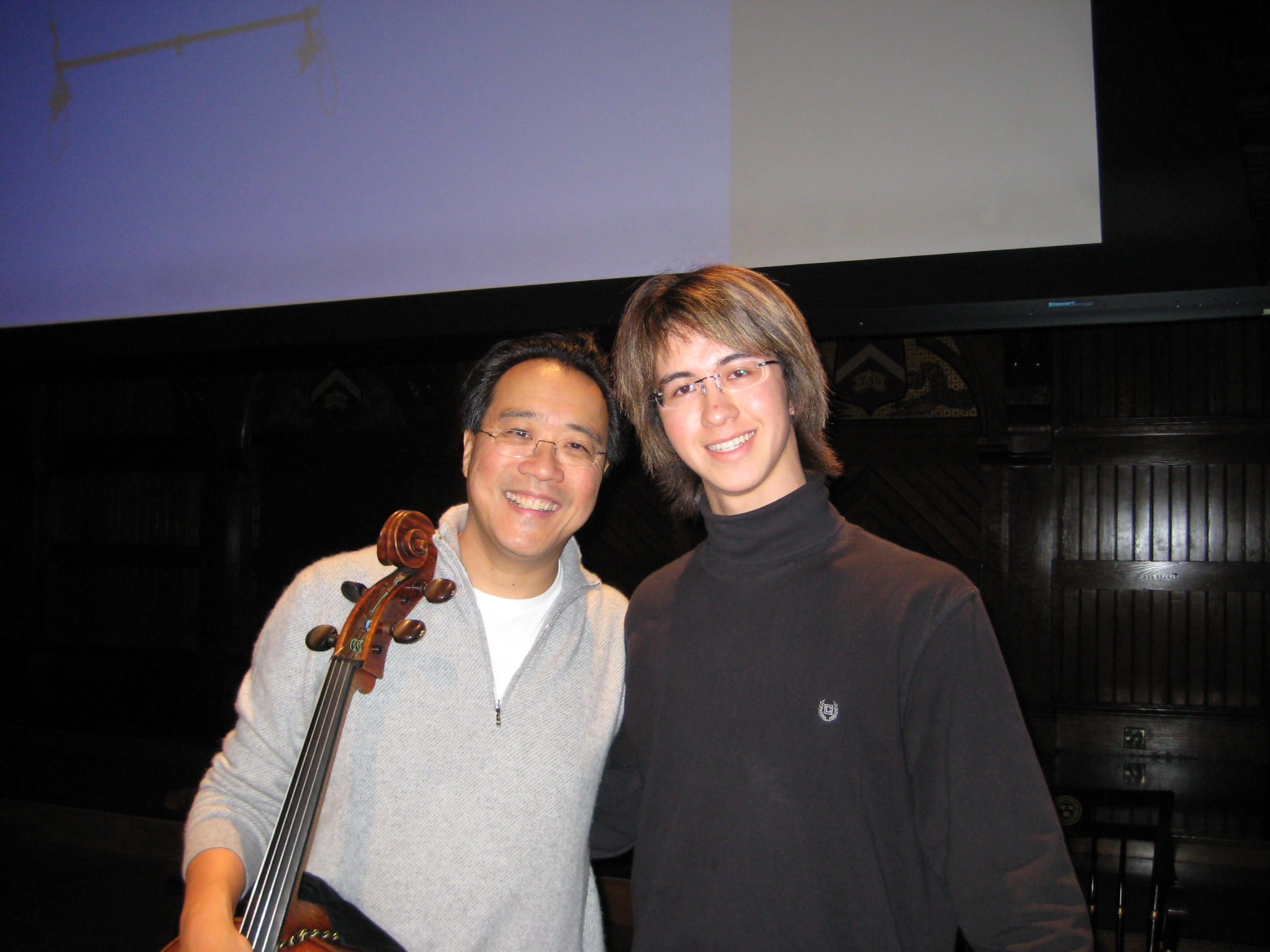
Yo-Yo Ma with Albright in December 2008

=== 2009 ===
In February, Albright competed in the IV Minnesota International Piano-e-Competition, performing at a piano salon in New York City. Albright competed at the Top of the World International Piano Competition in Norway in June 2009, where he competed through the semi-final round. He competed in the Vendome Prize International Piano Competition in Vienna and, though he was not selected among the top five finishers, he was given a special award by pianist and jury member Elisabeth Leonskaja.

In October, Albright gave a concert and taught his first master class at Western Washington University in Bellingham, Washington, as a guest artist for the Sanford Piano Series.

Albright was one of four winners of the 2009 Young Concert Artists International Auditions where he won the Paul A. Fish First Prize, the Ruth Laredo Award, the Sander Buchman Prize, the Ronald A. Asherson Prize, and the Sander Buchman Prize, as well as four performance prizes.

Albright performed approximately 28 times in the 2009-2010 Concert Season. Concert venues included those in Paris, Los Angeles, Boston, Michigan, and New York. In November 2009 Albright received the 2010 Gilmore Young Artist Award, given to two pianists biannually. Albright was granted $15,000 with an additional $10,000 for the commissioning of a new composition for piano.

He gave six concerts as a 2010 Gilmore Young Artist at the 2010 Gilmore Keyboard Festival in Michigan, where he received a review describing his playing as "Poetry in motion... with flair as well as fireworks... Maturity might be a given for a Gilmore Young Artist. But Albright's professional polish was evident, not simply in the way he played the piece, but in the manner he played with the orchestra, as opposed to against or merely alongside it." The review concluded that "This college kid... is going places in music," and that "In Royce Auditorium on Thursday, Albright was number one all the way."

=== 2010 ===
In Salt Lake City in June, Albright competed in the XV Gina Bachauer International Piano Competition, but he was not among the six finalists. On July 22, 2010, Albright made his San Francisco Symphony debut with the Duke Ellington "New World A-Comin'" with conductor Alondra de la Parra. He ended with an encore of Liszt's La Campanella to a standing ovation.

Albright made his Seattle Symphony debut with the Beethoven Piano Concerto, No. 3 with conductor Gerard Schwarz on September 10, 2010.

Performances in Albright's 2010-2011 Concert Season also included concerts in Boston (Isabella Stewart Gardner Museum and the New England Conservatory's Jordan Hall with the Longwood Symphony Orchestra), New York (Merkin Concert Hall), and Washington, D.C. (John F. Kennedy Center for the Performing Arts). He also gave master classes throughout the country.

After Albright's debut at the Kennedy Center for the Performing Arts on February 14, 2011, The Washington Post wrote that "Albright is among the most gifted musicians of his generation." It continued that "An impressive range of differently colored sounds at the keyboard was matched by overwhelming virtuosity" and that Albright "leapt the most outrageous technical hurdles... with a sense of dangerous self-abandon that was thrilling to hear. At the same time, musical shape was never sacrificed to showmanship."

Albright was named the Harvard University Leverett House Artist in Residence for 2011-2012. Previous Artists in Residence at Leverett have included the likes of cellist Yo-Yo Ma (1979–1981). In December 2010, he was named one of the 15 Most Interesting Seniors of the Harvard College Class of 2011.

=== 2011 ===
On May 26, 2011, Albright graduated from Harvard College with a Bachelor of Arts (B.A.) degree in economics.

Albright released his first commercial album, Vivace, in February 2011.

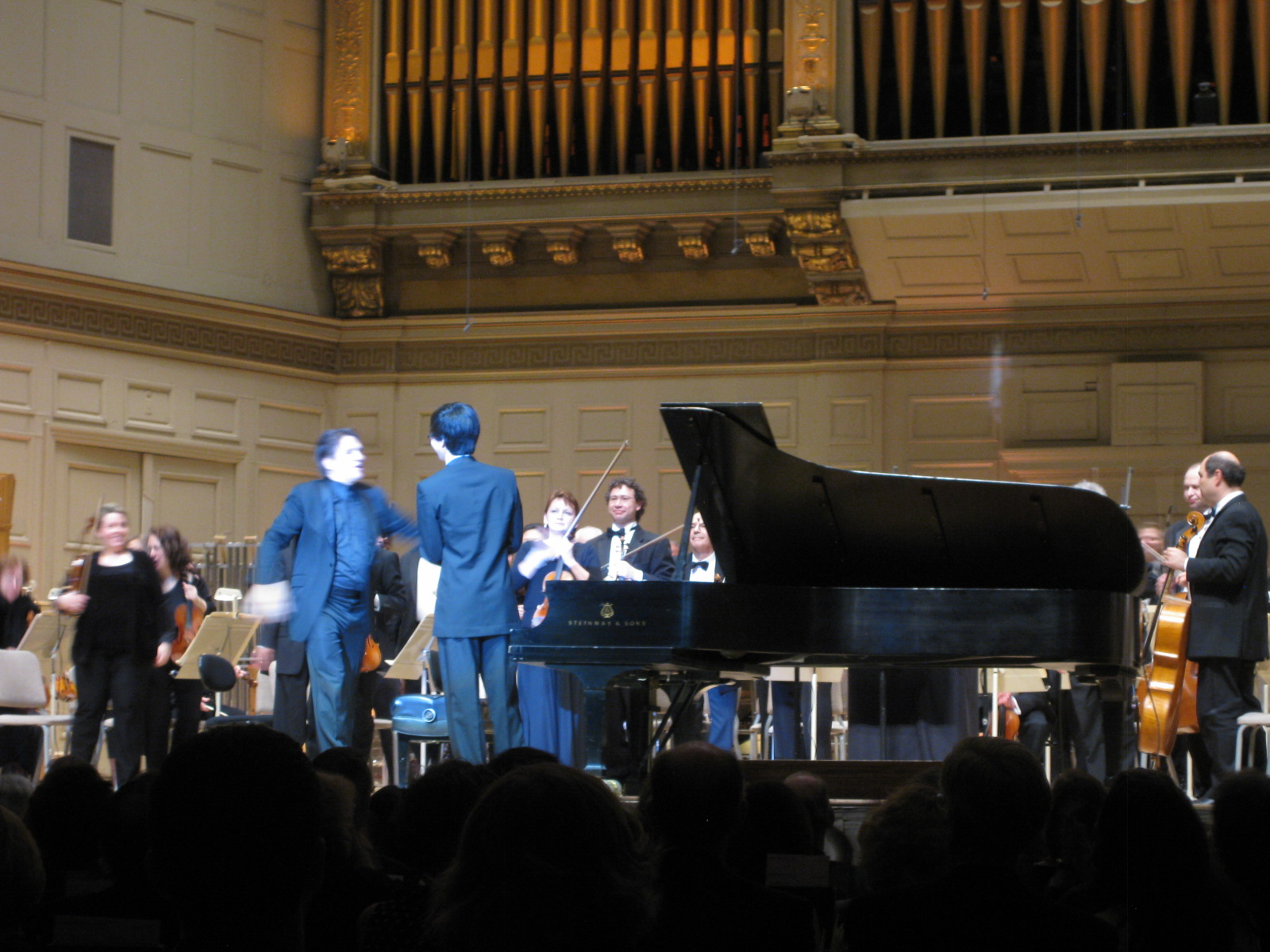
Keith Lockhart with Albright in May 2011

In June, 2011, Albright was accepted to the roster of Steinway Artists.

Albright was the first artist-in-residence of the 2011–2012 season of American Public Media's Performance Today, hosted by Fred Child. As such, he gave a weeklong series of performances and interviews for the national radio program.

=== 2012 ===
On May 20, 2012, Albright graduated from the New England Conservatory of Music with a Master of Music (M.M.) degree in Piano Performance, having studied under Wha-Kyung Byun. He traveled to Spain to compete in the Paloma O'Shea Santander International Piano Competition, but he did not move past the first round. He was accepted as one of three pianists to the Juilliard School of Music's Artist Diploma (AD) program, where he studies with Yoheved Kaplinsky.

=== 2013 ===
In 2013, Albright was named the recipient of the Arthur W. Foote Award of the Harvard Musical Association in Cambridge, Massachusetts.

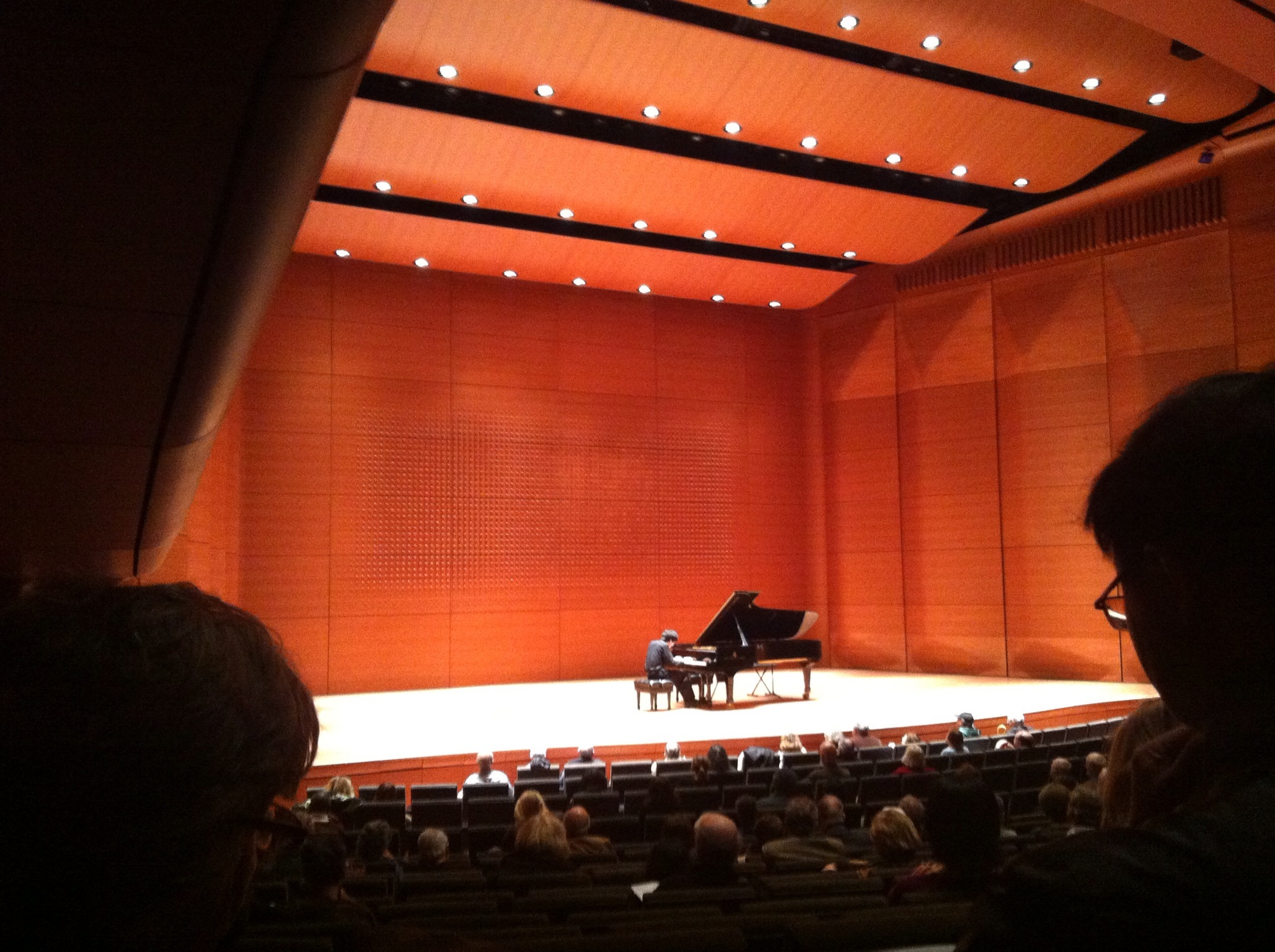
Albright in concert at Lincoln Center's Alice Tully Hall in February 2013

Albright was invited to give three All-Schubert solo concerts at the Isabella Stewart Gardner Museum in 2013, to which the Boston Musical Intelligencer wrote that the pianist was "unsurpassed" and "on the top tier." The author continued by writing that "It was gripping, frankly, both spellbinding and spellbound, quite unlike most such solo recitals I've heard over the decades."

The second of the three Schubert-cycle concerts at the Isabella Stewart Gardner Museum was met with praise, with reviews hailing that "Albright is a born Schubert player. Albright has the requisite chops of a competition winner, but the beauty, sensitivity, and taste of a mature artist. His Schubert was ravishing, imaginative, poetic—full of poignancy and lyricism. His interpretation sounded spontaneous, but this was also heartfelt, mature playing. Everything had been thought out by a mind brimming with musical intelligence."

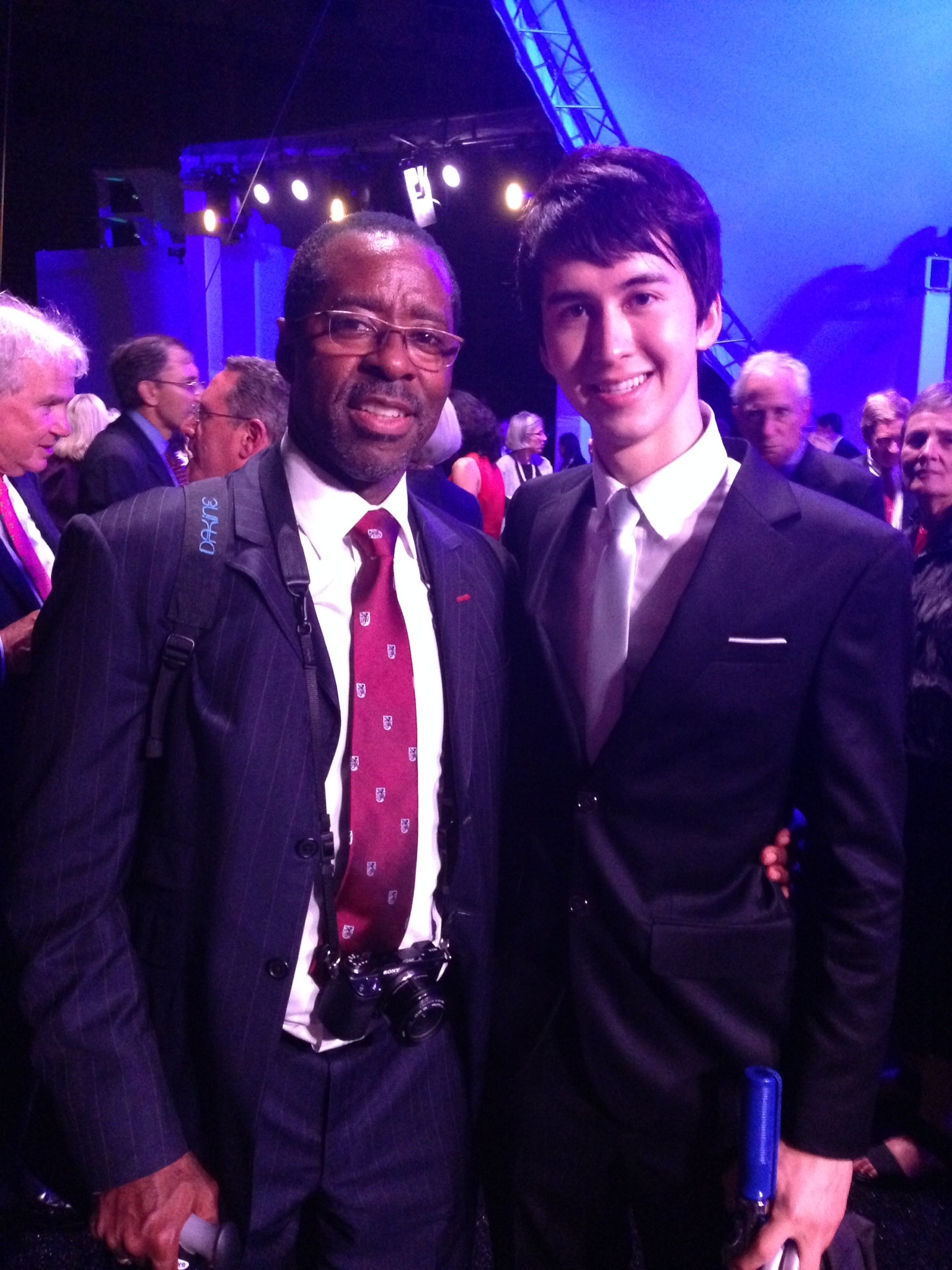
Actor Courtney Vance and Albright at Harvard University in September 2013

=== 2014 ===
On March 18, 2014, Albright was awarded the 2014 Avery Fisher Career Grant at the Lincoln Center for the Performing Arts. The award is "designed to give professional assistance and recognition to talented instrumentalists...who the Recommendation Board and Executive Committee of the Avery Fisher Artist Program believe to have great potential for major careers," and included a $25,000 grant. The executive committee consists of such artists as pianist Emanuel Ax and cellist Yo-Yo Ma.

== 2011-2026 concert seasons ==
Albright's 2011-2012 concert season included about 30 concerts and residencies throughout the United States. Highlights included a concert with cellist Yo-Yo Ma and the Silk Road Project commemorating the 10-year remembrance of the 9/11 attacks (September, 2011); guest artist appearances with such orchestras as the Phoenix Symphony (November, 2011) and the Lansing Symphony Orchestra in the 2012 Gilmore Keyboard Festival (May, 2012); masterclasses at universities; and solo concerts.

Albright's 2012-2013 concert season included about 38 concerts and residencies, including a fifth concert with cellist Yo-Yo Ma in a roundtable discussion with dancer Damian Woetzel by the Aspen Institute Arts Program; guest artist appearances with the San Francisco Symphony (CA, 2nd time), Fort Smith Symphony (AK), Whatcom Symphony (WA), Great Falls Symphony (MT), Lafayette Symphony (IN), Fargo-Moorhead Symphony (ND), Olympia Symphony (WA), and Hilton Head Symphony (SC); and solo concerts at the Phillips Collection, Isabella Stewart Gardner Museum, and the Mondavi Center at UC Davis.

Albright performed 77 concerts and outreaches/residencies during the 2013–2014 season. He made his orchestral and solo Canadian debuts with the Edmonton Symphony Orchestra and on the Vancouver Recital Society series. He also made a solo debut in South Korea at the Kumho Art Hall as part of the Kumho Asiana Cultural Foundation's Rising Stars Series.

Albright was awarded the 2014 Ruhr Klavier Festival Young Artist Scholarship, presented by pianist Marc-André Hamelin and included a debut at the 2014 Ruhr Festival in Germany.

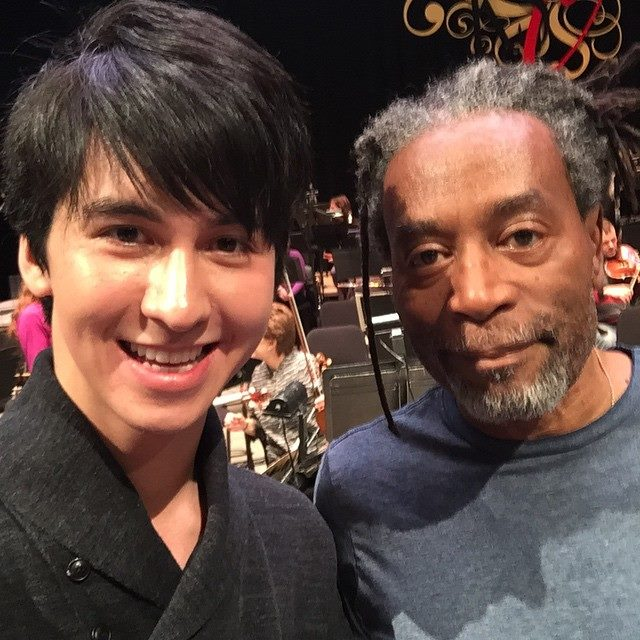
Albright with Bobby McFerrin in January, 2015

Albright gave a debut solo concert at the Rockport Music Festival on June 13, 2014, to critical acclaim (see "Reception" below). Highlights of the season include a 14-concert tour with conductor Keith Lockhart and the BBC Concert Orchestra, solo debuts at the Music Academy of the West, as well as debuts with vocalist/conductor Bobby McFerrin, the Kalamazoo Symphony Orchestra, the Tacoma Symphony, and the Victoria Symphony. Albright also made his debut in Finland with the Kymi Sinfonietta and conductor Alpesh Chauhan to critical acclaim. Tacoma Symphony was moved from the Rialto Theater to the larger Pantages Theater due to high demand for tickets.

Albright's 2015 BBC Concert Orchestra recording of the Shostakovich Piano Concerto No. 2 with Keith Lockhart was chosen as among the "BBC Performing Groups Best of 2015." The tour was met with rave reviews, claiming that "the orchestra and Albright proceeded to demonstrate how much they deserve all their honors and awards" and that "The BBC and Albright (were) the best of the year."

Albright made his solo debut at Avery Fisher Hall in the Lincoln Center for the Performing Arts' Mostly Mozart Festival on August 11 and 12 of 2015. He also debuted as the guest artist with the Houston Symphony, Des Moines Symphony, Alabama Symphony, and California Symphony; and again with the Seattle Symphony. He performed solo concerts in such venues as Detroit's Orchestra Hall, and also returned to begin a cycle of three theme-and-variations themed concerts at the Isabella Stewart Gardner Museum.

In April 2016, Albright made his Chinese debut at the National Centre for the Performing Arts with the NCPA Orchestra in Beijing, performing the Starry Sky Concerto written by Xiaogang Ye, which premiered at the 2008 Beijing Olympics' Opening Ceremony.

Albright's 2016–2017 season included debuts and engagements with the Baltimore Symphony, the Colorado Springs Symphony, and the Mobile Symphony. Solo recitals include performances at the Portland Piano International Summer Festival, the Rockefeller University, the Society of Four Arts, the Isabella Stewart Gardner Museum for the conclusion of a Themes and Variations cycle (Albright's second 3-concert cycle and 7th appearance at the venue), and a benefit concert at the Centralia College, which raised nearly $15,000 for the Charlie Albright Scholarship and Charlie Albright Piano.

In May 2017, Albright was asked last minute to perform at the Bergen International Festival at Grieg Hall in Bergen, Norway after a cancellation by pianist Lang Lang. The reception was overwhelmingly positive with Albright giving five encores.

Albright's 2018/2019 Concert Season includes his Isaac Stern Auditorium main stage Carnegie Hall debut with the American Symphony Orchestra and maestro Leon Botstein on January 25, 2018, performing the New York City debut of the Vivian Fine Concertante for Piano and Orchestra. The New York Classical Review praised his "tender phrasing," "Brahmsian sonorities," and improvised cadenza that "branched into "Lisztian extravagance." "The cherry on the sundae was the pianist's 60-second encore, hammering out a chorus of "Great Balls of Fire" in the rockin'est Jerry Lee Lewis style. Talk about '50s American music!"

In May 2019, Albright returned to the Bergen International Festival where he gave both a solo concert at the historic Hakonshallen with five encores, and also had the honor of performing the Grieg Piano Concerto in A minor with conductor Berit Cardas and the Bergen Philharmonic Orchestra at Grieg Hall, a yearly tradition of the festival. The Bergensavisen newspaper's raving review of Albright published that "Albright can imagine complex musical structures and share them with the audience. Everything is woven together by crazy technical electricity and rare musical understanding. During a flash he can imagine complex musical structures - and share them with us."

In 2020 and 2021, Albright's appearances and performances included a return to the Newport Music Festival for his fourth concert on the series, a celebration performance of Bergen, Norway's 950th birthday at the National Nordic Museum, fundraising for the arts, podcasts, interviews, and recordings. He was a featured guest artist with the Philly Pops and conductor David Charles Abbell on A Philly Pops Christmas: Spectacular Sounds of the Season, which was broadcast online, and I'll Be Home For Christmas: A Salute to the Military and First Responders, which was broadcast both online and over the American Forces Network to "approximately 500,000 servicemembers domestically and 500,000 internationally at both military bases and seafaring vessels," performing with singer Mandy Gonzalez from Broadway's production of Hamilton.

Albright's 2021/2022 season includes eight live performances with the Philly Pops for A Philly Pops Christmas: Spectacular Sounds of the Season with conductor David Charles Abbell, Broadway's Scarlett Strallen, and Broadway's Hugh Panaro, including broadcast on the American Forces Network to about 500,000 servicemembers worldwide, on television on 6ABC, and online. The concert featured the Liberace-Albright Christmas Medley, where Albright wore the Emmy-winning costume worn by Michael Douglas from the HBO film "Behind the Candelabra" and performed with Liberace's own real candelabra on the piano, both shipped in from the Liberace Museum in Las Vegas. Albright returned to Verizon Hall for three additional performances with the Philly Pops, conductor/vocalist/trumpeter Byron Stripling, and Broadway vocalists Allison Blackwell, Ryan Silverman, and Nikki Renee Daniels.

Albright's 2022/2023 season includes a performance in a fundraiser for WQXR radio in New York City in a program honoring Robert Sherman, alongside pianist Emanuel Ax, violinist Joshua Bell, the Emerson String Quartet, violinist Chee-Yun Kim, violinist Ani Kavafian, and pianist Ursula Oppens. He is also scheduled to give performances, recitals, speeches, and masterclasses nationwide in the US and Europe, including at the Bard Music Festival and with the Knoxville Symphony, the Signature Symphony, and the Des Moines Symphony.

In June 2023, Albright debuted at the Walt Disney Concert Hall in Los Angeles with Korean conductor Gum Nanse and the Seongnam Philharmonic Orchestra in a Peace Concert celebrating the 70th anniversary of U.S./Korean alliance following the Korean War, while raising money for the Korea-US Alliance Foundation to aid with the welfare of retired and current soldiers. The performance was also held in Fullerton, California.

In 2024, Albright performed as the guest artist for 8 performances with conductor Keith Lockhart and the Boston Pops at Symphony Hall in programs alongside Harry Connick Jr., Marc Martel, and Branford Marsalis. His South Korean orchestral debut with conductor Gum Nanse and the Seongnam Philharmonic at the Seongnam Arts Center sold out within a few hours of tickets being released, and he also made his Busan recital debut.

Albright performed several concert tours throughout the United States and South Korea in 2025, including at such venues as the Lotte Concert Hall at Lotte World Tower, Bundang Central Park, UC Irvine, GMC Music Center, Seoul Arts High School, and Sejong Center (Seoul). Collaborating with such conductors as Gum Nanse and Scott Speck, he performed with orchestras including the New World Philharmonic, the Seongnam Philharmonic, the Mobile Symphony, and the West Michigan Symphony.

== Discography ==
Vivace is Albright's commercial debut album, released in February 2011. The album holds six works, concluding with a piece composed by Albright. The others are by Haydn, Menotti, Schumann-Liszt, Janáček and Chopin. All of the works were recorded on the Albright Steinway in Corbet Theatre at Centralia College.

The Schubert Series - Live - Pt. 1 was commercially released in April 2017 as the first installment of a three-part series all-Schubert albums, recorded live in concert. Part 1 features Schubert's Opus 90 Impromptus and the Sonata in B-flat major, D 960, along with a live improvisation performed as an encore. This concert was described by the Boston Musical Intelligencer as "gripping, frankly, both spellbinding and spellbound, quite unlike most such solo recitals I've heard over the decades."

The Schubert Series - Live - Pt. 2 was released commercially in 2020. It includes Schubert's Six Moments Musicaux and Sonata in A Major, D. 959, along with a live improvisation performed as an encore. In a review of this concert, the Boston Musical Intelligencer raved that "His Schubert was ravishing, imaginative, poetic—full of poignancy and lyricism. It would seem Albright is a born Schubert player, whose taste is simply impeccable. His interpretation sounded spontaneous, but this was also heartfelt, mature playing. Everything had been thought out by a mind brimming with musical intelligence. Albright is a master of improvisation, and treated the audience to a fanciful three-minute riff on a short Schubertian-sounding theme. I have heard him do this musical stunt before—there are also examples on YouTube. Each time Albright's musical imagination and spontaneity amaze."

== Philanthropy ==
During September 2009, seven students at the Centralia College received the "Charlie Albright Scholarship," organized by the Centralia College Foundation from funds raised by a concert Albright gave in 2008. In December 2009, Centralia College purchased an instrument they called the "Charlie Albright Piano". Albright gave the inaugural performance on the nine-foot Model D Steinway, purchased for Corbet Theatre, on March 27, 2010.

On February 7, 2015, Albright raised over $14,000 at a fundraising benefit concert at the Centralia College for the benefit of the "Charlie Albright Scholarship" and maintenance of the piano named after him. Albright regularly performs benefit concerts to maintain the named scholarship and piano at the college.

Albright returned on November 18, 2023, to perform a benefit concert to raise money for the scholarship and piano fund in a sold-out concert titled "A Classical Christmas with Charlie Albright".

The Charlie Albright Scholarship at the Centralia College Foundation was officially endowed in May 2026, following a benefit concert on May 2.

Albright's philanthropic endeavors include performances raising money at Harvard for Haiti after the major earthquake in 2010. In 2019, Albright volunteered the guest artist for the sold-out Symphony Tacoma Gala event at the Museum of Glass in Tacoma, WA. The event raised over $185,000 for the non-profit organization.

== Sponsorship ==
Albright has been sponsored by individuals and organizations, including Elizabeth and James Watson; he lived in their Manhattan apartment. Albright was also sponsored by the Bagby Foundation for the Performing Arts.

== Reception ==
Albright has received positive reviews in the media.

The Washington Post declared that "Albright is among the most gifted musicians of his generation." It continued that "An impressive range of differently colored sounds at the keyboard was matched by overwhelming virtuosity" and that Albright "leapt the most outrageous technical hurdles... with a sense of dangerous self-abandon that was thrilling to hear. At the same time, musical shape was never sacrificed to showmanship." With regards to Albright's 2015 tour with Keith Lockhart and the BBC Concert Orchestra, they wrote that Albright "made quite an impression. He is full of ideas...and has a dazzling natural keyboard affinity. He does not have an overpowering sonority (fingers more velvet than steel) but a lot of nuance." After an April 24, 2015, concert, the DC Metro Theater Arts wrote that "Albright was brought back to perform an encore: the audience picked four musical notes and he improvised a piece using those four notes as a base. To hear the initial sequence of four notes and then what an elaborate, beautiful piece Albright turned those simple notes into was thrilling. To listen to his own improvisation, and the emotion he poured into this simple piece...really showed his skill and passion for the piano and for music."

The New York Times praised Albright's "Jaw-dropping technique" and described his playing as "virtuosity with a distinctive musicality throughout"

The Philadelphia Inquirer published that ""Such a display still has novelty, though Albright didn't need it, so distinctive were his improvisational ideas and overall presence. Though the demure lyricism of "Fur Elise" is something one associates with music boxes, Albright took off from it in what turned into a tour of 19th-century pianism. As clever as he sounds, Albright, in fact, gave the improvisation something I rarely witness in such settings: a highly personal emotional depth, as if he was expressing his inner self rather than simply exercising his powers of invention. This concert brought the art of classical-music improvisation to a new level. Of course, Beethoven's Piano Concerto No. 3 was bound to show a more filtered version of Albright — it's a tightly written concerto — though his personality was evident in his way of shaping a phrase with a kind of extravagance that had showmanship but never felt cheap. With a fresh, clean, crystalline sound, he played with a kind of ease and smoothness that refuses to airbrush the music, but animates it from within. You simply hear more Beethoven than usual and with a kind of rhythmic momentum that makes you listen more closely, no matter how familiar the music has become. And yes, he improvised the first-movement cadenza as Beethoven himself might have."

The Boston Musical Intelligencer wrote that if Albright "is not indisputably first among equals, he seems to me unsurpassed, anyway, and on the top tier. I will be surprised to hear another performance at this level very soon. It was gripping, frankly, both spellbinding and spellbound, quite unlike most such solo recitals I've heard over the decades." On a separate occasion, they wrote that "Albright has the requisite chops of a competition winner, but the beauty, sensitivity, and taste of a mature artist. is Schubert was ravishing, imaginative, poetic—full of poignancy and lyricism. It would seem Albright is a born Schubert player, whose taste is simply impeccable. His interpretation sounded spontaneous, but this was also heartfelt, mature playing. Everything had been thought out by a mind brimming with musical intelligence." In response to his improvised encore, they wrote that "Albright is a master of improvisation."

The New York Concert Review wrote that "Albright is a pianist whose name music-lovers will be hearing more and more. Winner of a slew of awards, most prominently a 2014 Avery Fisher Career Grant, Mr. Albright is now in the company of musicians who have become household names…Ursula Oppens, Richard Stoltzman, Joshua Bell, Hillary Hahn, Yuja Wang, and many others who have made their marks. Mr. Albright will undoubtedly lend his own additional distinction to this already illustrious group. This concert, an evening not to be forgotten. He displayed a joy in his playing that was utterly infectious. Beethoven, for one, felt new, because as casual as Mr. Albright was in his stage style and commentary, he was equally intense in his high-powered performances. The finale…took on a fire of the master's Op. 57 or 111. It was brilliant, precise, and powerful. In fact, throughout the entire evening, he displayed a joy in playing that was utterly infectious. He disarms jaded concertgoers with an openness and humility that for some reason we are not prepared to expect. Albright brings a vibrant spirit and limitless range for performances. He possesses a kind of intellect that doesn't stop growing and will no doubt continue to surprise as his career progresses. The Etude No. 11 ("Winter Wind"), was, as they say, "as good as it gets" – and so was No. 12 ("The Ocean"). The improvisation was…spectacular, and the spontaneity, even with stylistic similarity to Chopin and Rachmaninoff, kept one on the edge of one's seat. The improvisation alone was worth the trip. Bravo – and encore!"

On June 13, 2014, Albright gave a debut solo recital in the Rockport Music Festival, where the Boston Musical Intelligencer declared that the "piano sensation gave an impassioned and masterful performance." It continued that "Albright, who possesses titanic technical skill and much emotional sensitivity, parted the gloomy skies with a sparkling stage-side manner, a welcoming sense of informality, and the artistic willingness and musical chops to include improvisation on the program, a still-rare skill that is being resuscitated by our best artists." Regarding Chopin's Op. 25 etudes, the review stated that "Albright launched into the 12-piece set, forming it with the coherency of a piano symphony."

Albright's European orchestral debut in Finland with the Kymi Sinfonietta was met with critical acclaim. The Kymen Sanomat wrote that "Charlie Albright captured its sound world and structures with unfailing mastery. His total immersion in the composer's innermost being continued in the dreamy, bubbling Andante, from which burst the majestic Grande Polonaise for piano and orchestra. It is a most brilliant work of its kind. In the hands of this soloist, the texture, bathed in full splendour, flowed along with an effortless virtuosity enlivened by a primitive rhythmic drive and a refined piano tone. The arrangement of W.A. Mozart's Rondo 'alla Turca' heard as an encore soared like a magnificent firework in which virtuosity knew no bounds."

After Albright's May 15, 2015, concert with the West Michigan Symphony Orchestra, mLive.com wrote that "The ultimate goal is to enjoy music with pure delight and unbridled passion. The virtuoso talent of (Albright)...offered a glimpse of how that can be achieved."

Albright's 2015 US tour with conductor Keith Lockhart and the BBC Concert Orchestra was chosen as one of the "BBC Performing Groups Best of 2015."

On October 3, 2016, Albright concluded a second three-concert cycle at the Isabella Stewart Gardner Museum, where he was raved as the "Undisputed Master of Variations." It was published that "Many pianists possess great technique; many retain a broad repertoire. Charlie Albright has something extra: the propensity to make concerts riveting, fun and exhilarating. His unique way of communing with the music merges his intentions with the composer's, bringing freshness of vision and unique expressive ability to his performances." In his performance of Handel, "Albright played it as a fellow musician-composer, in intimate communion with the essentials of the music." With regard to Albright's Kapustin, "Two right hands are just what Albright has, and in his hands the jazziness was not only emphasized, but was perfectly executed in the best rendition of this work that you are likely to hear. At times he seemed to be channelling Art Tatum, the difficult rhythms seeming effortless and natural, the variations the essence of jazz." In the improvised encore of themes-and-variations based on notes from the audience "Each new variation disclosed a distinctive quality, ranging from urgent to lyrical, solemn to adventurous, shifting from waltz to march to ballade and more—all while maintaining the overall coherence of the idiom. A vast momentum gathered before coming to a convincing cadence."

The Omaha World-Herald raved about Albright's two sets of appearances with the Omaha Symphony Orchestra in 2016 and 2019. Albright's Chopin, Andante Spianato and Grande Polonaise Brillante was described as "inspired." "His acrobatics on the keyboard earned another swift standing ovation. Then his frenzied encore of "Great Balls of Fire" by Jerry Lee Lewis summoned the crowd to their feet a third time." They wrote that he is "widely and rightly hailed as a virtuoso to be watched" who performed the Ravel Concerto in G Major with "dynamism," "gorgeous technique," "impeccable phrasing," "and just the right amount of inspired improvisation." "His commanding performance was the kind that leaves audiences speechless."

Arts Knoxville described Albright's performance of the Grieg Concerto as "sensational" and "rewarding," writing that "The key to the Grieg concerto in the 21st Century lies in finding a fresh point of view, and that is exactly what Albright...did. From the opening passage, Albright's passionate attention to the details of phrases offered nuances that are often glossed over by other pianists. In dynamics, too, Albright created a storyline using massaged tempos and steps of volume that drift off into intense softness, passages that brought the listener forward in their seat in order to catch every note. And, while he didn't shy away from Grieg's waves of Romantic emotion in the orchestration, Albright kept the focus on the crisp melodic storytelling throughout. The cadenza of the opening Allegro molto moderato movement was a feast of emotional playing that has, as its ultimate destination, a flash and bang close that often urges the unwary listener to applaud without restraint, admittedly understandable under the circumstances. With the KSO audience fully enthralled by Albright's performance and hungry for more, the pianist offered an ear-opening encore, his own hyper-speed take on "Great Balls of Fire.""

After a 2022 concert with the Signature Symphony in Tulsa, Oklahoma, Tulsaworld.com raved that "Albright's performance...was one of the best I've ever heard."

After Albright's debut with the Pittsburgh Symphony Orchestra in April 2024, Onstage Pittsburgh wrote that "Stellar and captivating, this young star will undoubtedly be a legend himself."

Albright's appearance on Opening Night of the Boston Pops' 138th Season with Harry Connick Jr. was met with a raving review by the Boston Globe. For "Rhapsody (in Blue)" itself, Charlie Albright attacked his piano with hungry speed, more like a hotshot jazz pianist than a classical player. He took ample advantage of the free time of his solo sections, teasing out some passages and charging heedlessly through others; his quick crumpling of the ending notes of one passage garnered a laugh from the audience. And Albright's choice of encore — a careening "Great Balls of Fire" — showed that Jerry Lee Lewis wasn't miles off from "Rhapsody in Blue."" Broadway World Boston also raved of his "piano mastery," writing that "Albright wasted no time demonstrating the talent that made him a onetime wunderkind, delivering a fresh, vigorous, and imaginative take on the Gershwin classic that was the stand-out opening-night selection. As his richly earned encore, Albright all but attacked the keyboard – while leaving both feet planted on the floor – for a rousing rendition of “Great Balls of Fire,” a 1957 hit for Jerry Lee Lewis."
