= Jules Gentil =

French pianist (1898–1985)

- Jules-Gentil.jpg

Jules Gentil
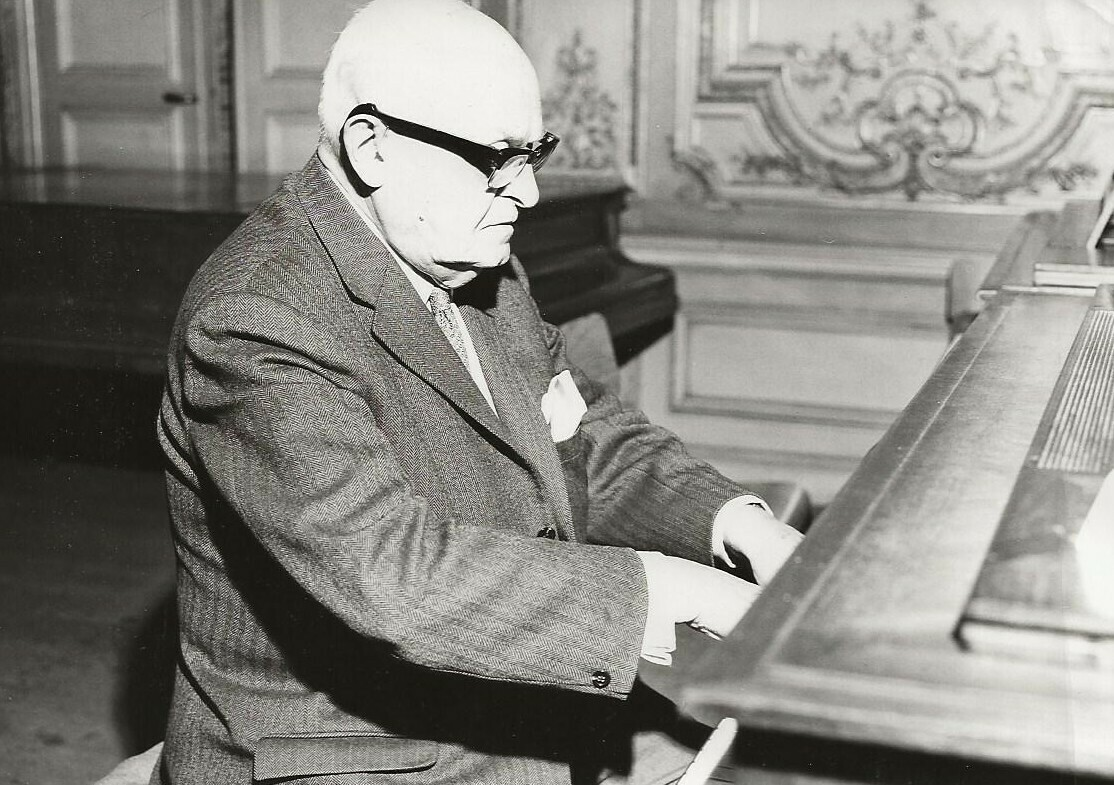
- Jules Gentil playing piano
- Born: Jules Charles Henri Gentil; 10 February 1898; Annecy
- Died: 20 May 1985 (aged 87); La Verrière
- Occupation: Piano teacher

Jules Charles Henri Gentil (10 February 1898 – 20 May 1985) was a French pianist and pedagogue.

== Biography ==
Born in Annecy, son of music compositor Jules Marie Victor Gentil (1864–1940) (1864–1940), Jules Charles Henri Gentil first studied the piano with his mother Anna Mockers (1861–1937), who had been a student of Georges Mathias, then with Santiago Riera (1867–1959) at the Conservatoire de Paris, where he won a first prize in 1916. Having also worked with Lazare-Lévy he often played with his brother violinist Victor Gentil (1892–1973) and with cellist Gérard Hekking. He taught at the École normale de musique de Paris from 1920, then shared the management of the school with Alfred Cortot from 1938. He was also a teacher at the Conservatoire de Paris, from 1941 to 1969, and also gave several masterclasses in the United States.

Gentil died in La Verrière at age 87.

== Teaching ==
Gentil helped train many pianists including Jean Micault, Gail Delente, Pierre Froment, Marie-Catherine Girod, Ramzi Yassa, Seth Carlin, David Lively, Michel Sogny, and also composers such as Alain Weber, André Mathieu, and Alain Bernaud.

According to his students' accounts, his teaching was turned towards the research of gestures allowing an easy execution, if necessary with unconventional fingerings, giving importance to the role of shoulders and arms, by bringing a particular care to the pedal. He did hardly any scale or exercise work, and thus moved away from the habits of his time in French piano teaching.

== Bibliography ==
- Timbrell, Charles (2003). French pianism, a historical perspective. Portland, Oregon: Amadeus Press. p. 370. ISBN 978-1-57467-045-5.
