= Michel Sogny piano method =

System of teaching music and piano

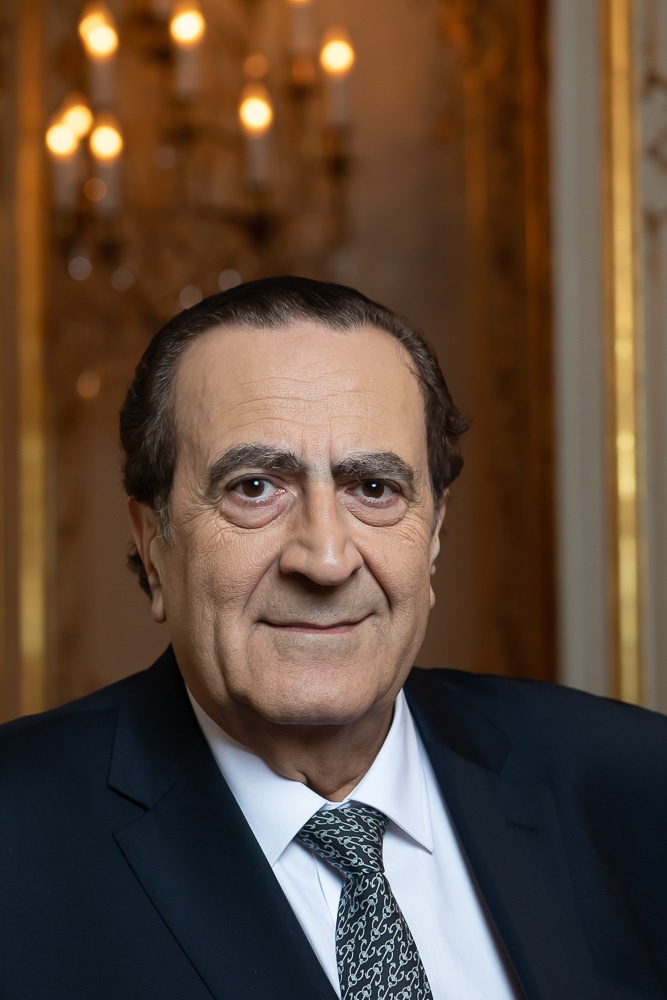
Michel Sogny in Paris in 2012

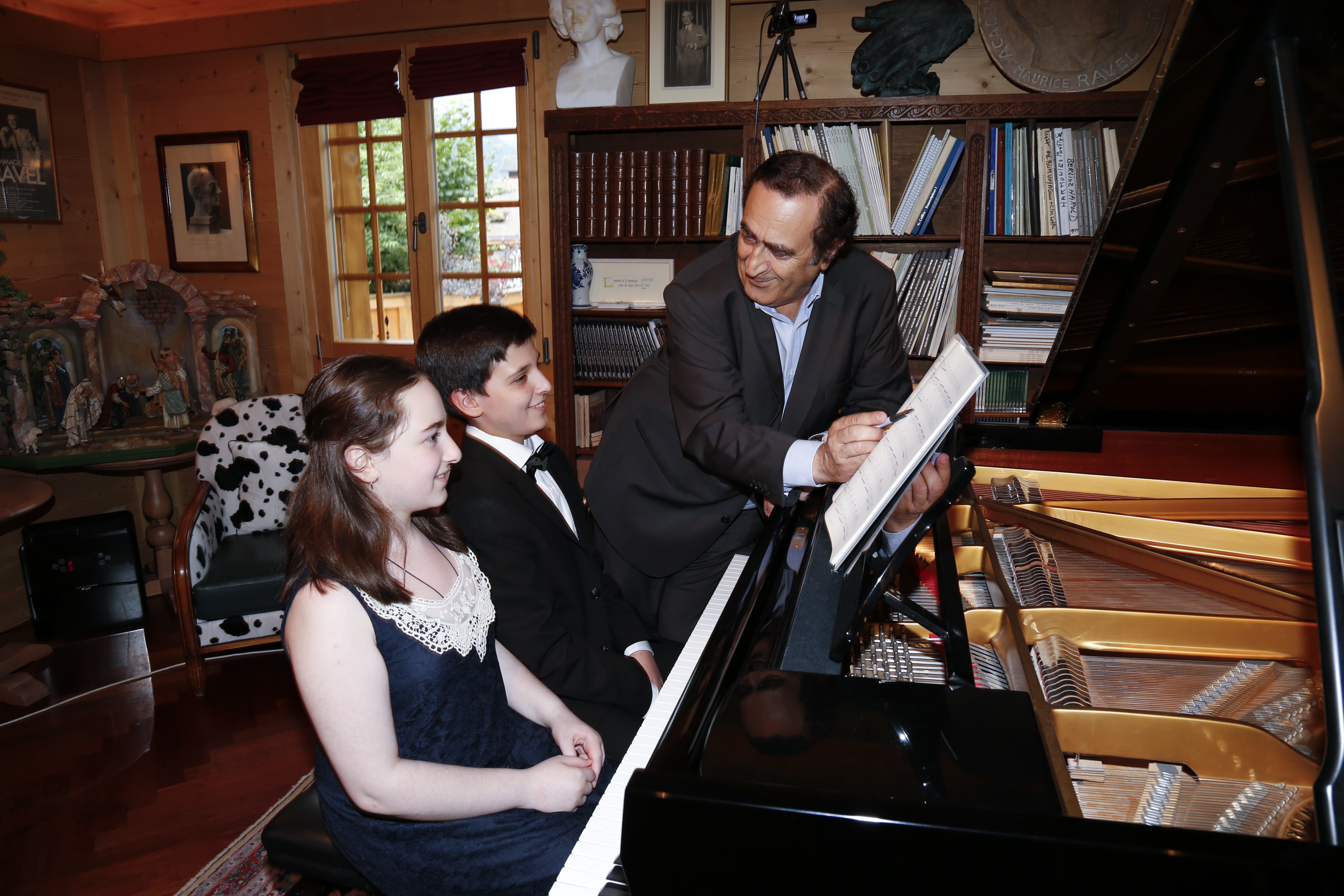
Barbara Tataradze and Ilia Lotatidze with Michel Sogny

Michel Sogny piano method is a system of teaching music and piano created by French pianist, composer and teacher Michel Sogny.

Sogny's methodology is taught at his schools in Paris and Geneva. Since 1974, it is claimed that more than 20,000 students have used this method to learn piano method.

The method consists of two main components: Didactic works - Prolégomènes, which represent small exercises. Prolégomènes are supposed to develop the perception of musical symphony and sound. The second direction consists of the cycle of etudes, where the concentration is on development of technical skills, as hand gestures and positions.

In 1981, one senator formally addressed the Minister of Culture, Jack Lang to discuss Michel Sogny's methodology, receiving a reply that stated that this method falls in line with other subsidies that the government was already giving for adult musical education.

Michel Sogny founded SOS Talents Foundation in 2002. The stated goal of the foundation is to support talented young musicians from economically poor backgrounds (who mostly come from Eastern European countries). Pianists who are the nominees of the foundation, follow Sogny's piano method and perform their program during various concerts.

The first gala concert of SOS Talents Foundation was held in 2001 at the Marcel Dassault Palace in Paris, with patronage of Serge and Nicole Dassault, participants included, Sogny's students Yana Vassileva and Khatia Buniatishvili. Same year at the Théàtre des Champs-Élysées performed: Elisso Bolkvadze, Yana Vassilieva, Khatia Buniatishvili and her sister Gvantsa.
