= Michel Sogny =

French pianist

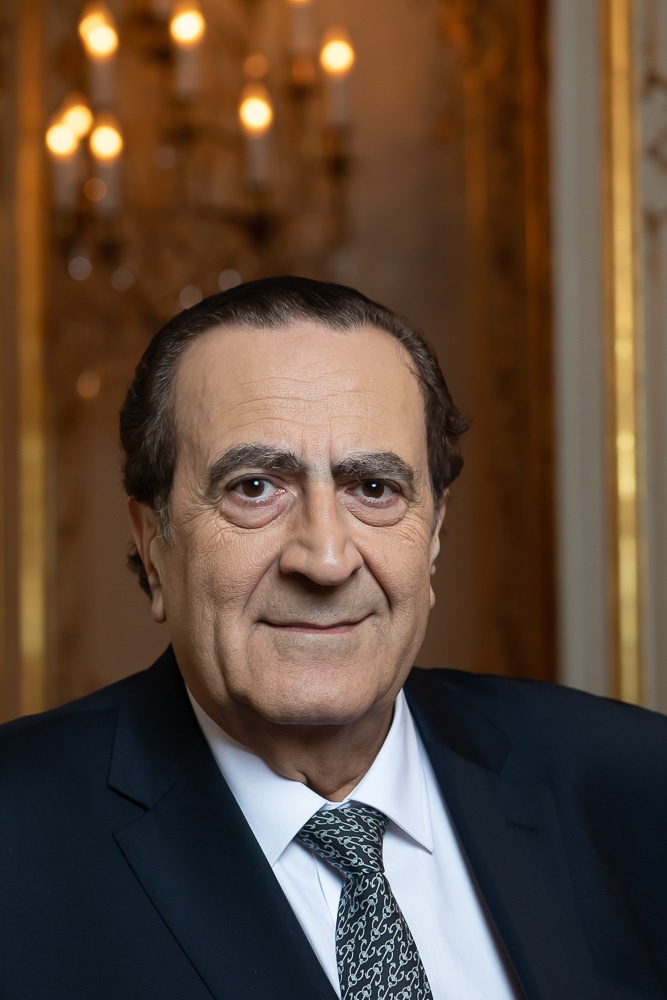
- Michel Sogny in Paris in 2012
- Born: 21 November 1947 (age 78); Pau, France
- Occupations: Pianist, composer, pedagogue, writer,
- Website: michelsogny.ch

Michel Sogny (born 21 November 1947 in Pau, France) is a French pianist, composer, and writer of Hungarian descent who developed a new approach to teaching the piano.

== Biography ==
Michel Sogny attended École Normale de Musique de Paris, where he pursued piano studies under the direction of Jules Gentil and Yvonne Desportes. He holds a master's degree in psychology, a bachelor's degree in literature and a PhD in philosophy, which he completed at the Sorbonne in 1974 under the direction of Vladimir Jankélévitch. Michel Sogny is the founder of SOS Talents Foundation.

Along with Valéry Giscard d'Estaing and Franz Liszt's great-granddaughter, Blandine Ollivier de Prévaux, Sogny was one of the founding members of the Franz Liszt French Association.

In 1974 Michel Sogny founded a music school in Paris as well as opening a literary and musical salon where he gathered artists, writers and intellectuals.

In 1975, he published his first book, Admiration Créatrice chez List. The preface to his book was written by György Cziffra.

In 1981 he appeared in the television series Grâce à la Musique – Franz Liszt directed by François Reichenbach. He also opened a second music school in Geneva.

In 1990, Michel Sogny gave a remarkable recital at the Espace Cardin in Paris, where he premiered his works: Triptych, Aquaprism, and Furia. This recital was recorded on CD as Michel Sogny at the Espace Cardin.

In 1995, Sogny was invited to be the artistic director at Villa Schindler, a musical institution in Austria, under the patronage of Yehudi Menuhin. Under his guidance young pianists follow masterclasses and perform at international festivals. Some of Villa Schindler students, include pianists: Elisso Bolkvadze, Tamar Beraia, Khatia Buniatishvili, Yana Vassilieva and Anna Fedorova.

Michel Sogny founded the SOS Talents Foundation whose main goal is to support talented young musicians from economically poor backgrounds (mostly Eastern European countries). Pianists who are the nominees of the foundation follow Sogny's piano method and perform in various concerts.

The first gala concert of SOS Talents Foundation was held in 2001 at the Marcel Dassault Palace in Paris, under the patronage of Serge and Nicole Dassault. Participants included Sogny's students Yana Vassileva and Khatia Buniatishvili. The same year Elisso Bolkvadze, Yana Vassilieva, Khatia Buniatishvili and her sister Gvantsa performed at the Théàtre des Champs-Élysées.

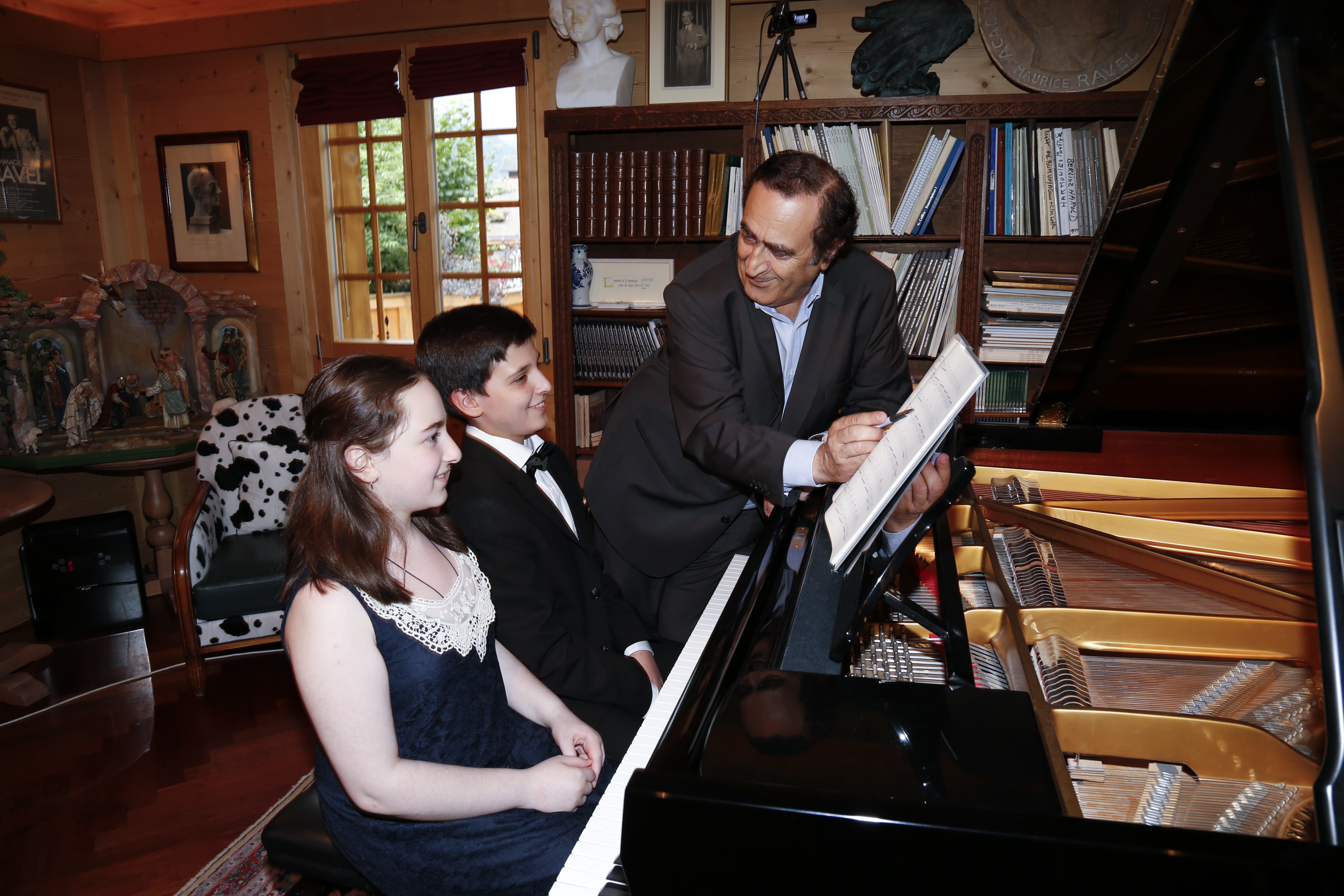
Barbara Tataradze and Ilia Lotatidze with Michel Sogny

In 2002, SOS Talents Foundation hosted an international festival in Montreux, Switzerland. Aldo Ciccolini performed along young pianists Elisso Bolkvadze, Tamar Beraia, Khatia Buniatishvili and Yana Vaissileva.

In 2004, in Coppet, Switzerland, Michel Sogny founded the new festival Festival de Piano Michel Sogny.

In 2009, under the patronage of President of Lithuania, Valdas Adamkus, Sogny hosted a gala concert of SOS Talents Foundation in Vilnius.

In 2013, Michel Sogny introduces thriller L’Adulte Prodige. The book narrates the story of a young musician Michele Paris.

In 2014, Michel Sogny publishes his philosophical work, De Victor Hugo à Dostoïevsky, a dialogue with Alexis Philonenko.

Throughout 2017–2019, Michel Sogny is invited to Georgia to hold master classes in the framework of the Batumi International Festival. He is accordingly invited to Japan, at Ishikawa Music Academy.

== Michel Sogny piano method ==
Sogny's methodology is taught at his schools in Paris and Geneva. Since 1974, over 20,000 students have learned piano by Sogny's method.

The method consists of two main components: Didactic works (Prolégomènes), which are small exercises developing the perception of musical symphony and sound, and a cycle of etudes, which concentrate on developing of technical skills, as hand gestures and positions.

One of Sogny's students, who started piano practice as an adult, was French language professor Michel Paris. After completing Sogny's four-year methodology course, at the age of 30 she performed a solo concert at Théâtre des Champs-Élysées with the patronage of Ministry of Culture.

In 1981, the French Senate formally addressed the Minister of Culture, Jack Lang to discuss the introduction of Sogny's methodology throughout France.

On June 24, 2023, Michel Sogny received the Grand Prix Alain Fournier for his book "L'Adulte Prodige" awarded at La Sorbonne by "Accademia Euromediterrania delle ARTI"

== Literary works ==
- L'admiration créatrice chez Liszt
- Le solfège sans soupir (Nouvelle édition entièrement remaniée éditions Sirella) (1984)
- Abrégé de solfège (Sirella)
- La méthode en question(s) (Sirella)
- La méthode en action (Guide de l’Élève éditions Sirella)
- Initiation à l'art de la composition musicale (Sirella)
- La Musique en Question, entretiens avec Monique Philonenko Ed. Michel de Maule (2009)
- L'adulte prodige – Le rêve au bout des doigts Editions France-Empire (2013)
- De Victor Hugo à Dostoïevski – Entretiens philosophiques avec Alexis Philonenko, Editions France-Empire (2013)

== Scores ==
- Dérive pour piano (Durand)
- Entrevisions 12 pièces pour piano (Durand)
- 12 études pour piano dans le style hongrois Séries I à IV (Durand)
- Hommage à Franz Liszt (Durand)
- Aquaprisme (Durand)
- 3 Pièces dans le style hongrois (Durand)
- 12 pièces pour piano pour la main droit seule (à France Clidat) (Artchipel)
- 48 Etudes de Perfectionnement (Artchipel)
- Etudes pour piano Séries I à IV (Artchipel)
- 24 Pensées Vagabondes (Artchipel)
- Paralipomènes à une eidétique musicale 14 pièces pour piano (Artchipel)
- Pièces de concert pour piano (Artchipel)
- Prolegomenes à une eidetique musicale (series I à VII) (Artchipel)

== Honours and awards ==
- Order of Honor, Georgia (2017)
- Honorary Consul of Lituania in Switzerland
- UNESCO Diploma of Honour (1994)
- United Nations Peace Medal (1986)

== Related links ==
- Michel Sogny Official Website
- Michel Sogny, l’art de la résilience Le Figaro
- Michel Sogny Academy
- Michel Sogny Personal Website
- SOS Talents Foundation
- Works at Artchipel
- Works at la Flute de Pan
