= Batumi Black Sea Music and Art Festival =

Annual international festival in Batumi, Georgia

- Genre: Various
- Locations: Georgia, ბათუმი
- Years active: 2013 — present
- Founders: Elisso Bolkvadze

Batumi Black Sea Music and Art Festival (Georgian: ბათუმის შავი ზღვის მუსიკისა და ხელოვნების საერთაშორისო ფესტივალი) is an international festival that takes place in Batumi, Georgia every year.

The festival was founded in 2013 by Georgian pianist, and UNESCO Artist for Peace Elisso Bolkvadze and by the producer Ms. Tamar Ghoghoberidze. Since then, the Elisso Bolkvadze Charity Foundation "Lira" together with the " Pragma Art Group" has been the event organizer. One of the project's main focuses is the promotion of young Georgian talents. Batumi Black Sea Festival features many projects and contests, such as the 'Pearl of Batumi' and the 'Pearl of NY- International"

Musicians from all regions of Georgia take part in the festival. The outstanding among them are invited to participate in international programs and concerts abroad.

Along with Georgian musicians, famous foreign musicians regularly participate in the festival.

The Batumi Black Sea Music and Art Festival is the only cultural event in Georgia that has received the high patronage of UNESCO five times.

On July 23–31, 2022, the Batumi Black Sea International Music and Art Festival was held for the ninth time. On July 23, the festival opened with a charity gala concert, and the proceeds were used for Ukrainian children affected by the war waged by Russia in Ukraine.

At the invitation of the project's founder, Elisso Bolkvadze, the Wikimedia Community User Group Georgia also participated in the 2022 festival. Members of the group introduced Wikipedia's essence, purpose, principles, and plans to the public.
