= Gum Nanse =

South Korean conductor (born 1947)

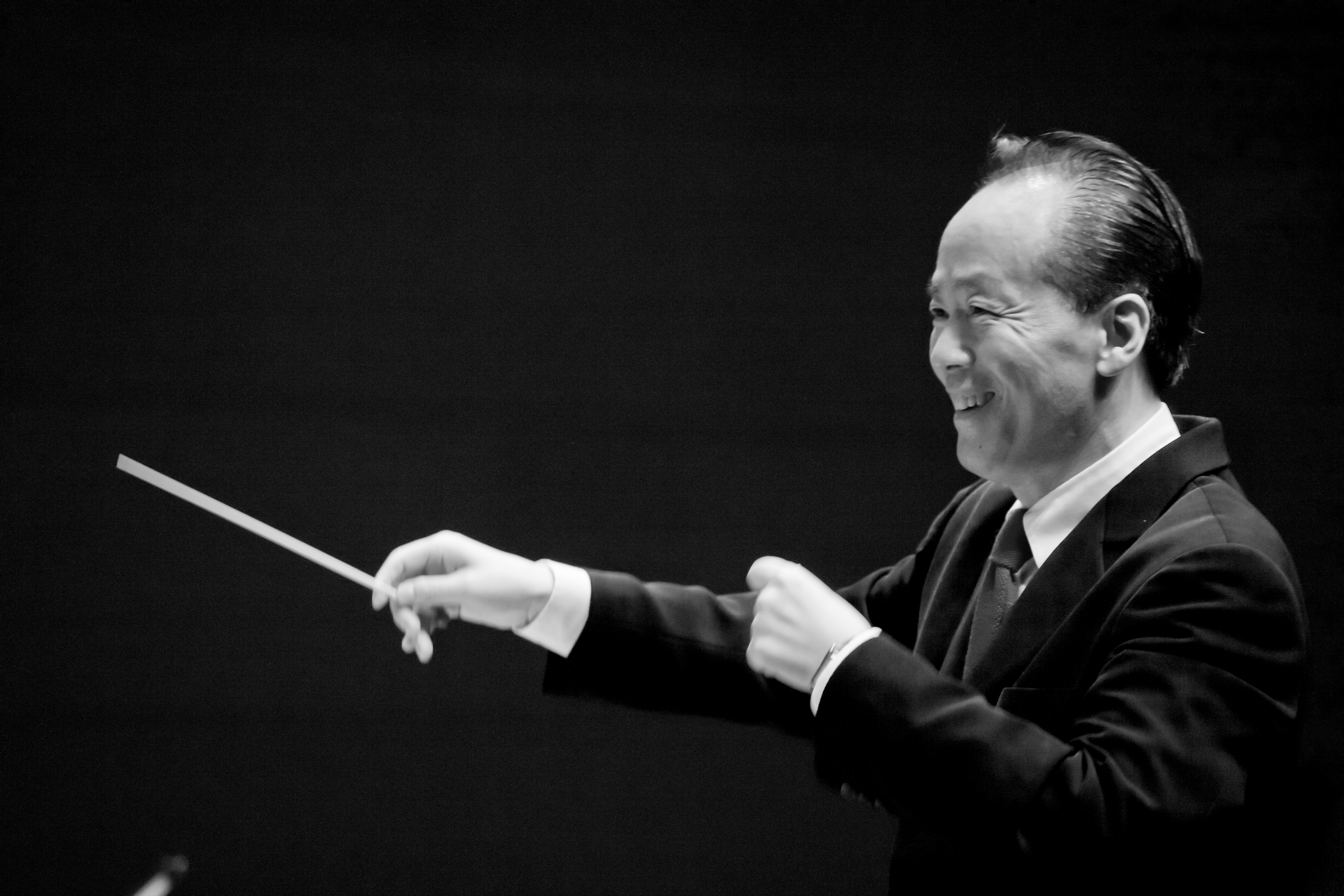
- Born: Gum Nanse; September 25, 1947 (age 79); Busan, Southern Korea
- Occupation: Conductor

Korean name
- Hangul: 금난새
- RR: Geum Nansae
- MR: Kŭm Nansae

Gum Nanse, also known as Maestro Nanse Gum (Korean: 금난새; born September 25, 1947), is a conductor from South Korea. He is the founder, director general, and artistic director of the Seongnam Philharmonic Orchestra, established in 1997. He served as the principal of Seoul Arts High School from 2013 to August 2019. In April 2021, the Gum Nanse Music Center, a concert hall dedicated to chamber music was opened in Busan.

== Early life ==
Gum was born in Busan, South Korea, to Suhyun Gum, a composer and music educator. He developed an early interest in music and pursued formal education in the arts. He attended Seoul Arts High School. After high school, Gum enrolled at Seoul National University, where he studied musical composition and explored theoretical and practical aspects of music. He continued his education in Germany, studying conducting at the Universität der Künste in Berlin. Under the guidance of Professor Hans-Martin Rabenstein, he gained experience in orchestral performance and direction.

== Career ==
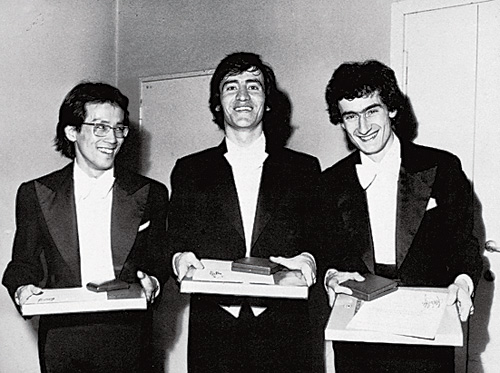
Karajan Conductors' Competition in 1977. Gum Nanse (left), Valery Gergiev (middle), Jacek Kaspszyk (right)

In 1977, Gum was awarded the fourth prize at the Herbert von Karajan Conductor's Competition and became the first Korean conductor to lead the Berlin Philharmonic Orchestra. After returning to Korea in 1980, he was appointed the conductor of the KBS Symphony Orchestra, which he held for 12 years.

In 1992, Gum became the conductor of the Suwon Philharmonic Orchestra. He introduced initiatives to improve the Suwon Philharmonic Orchestra's performances and public profile.

While in Suwon, Gum organized special concerts, including a 7-hour Marathon Concert and a New Year's Eve Concert at Seoul Arts Center. In 1994, he started an educational concert series with the Seoul Arts Center for young students titled "Young People's Concerts with Gum Nanse." These concerts were held from 1994 to 1999 and drew large audiences.

During Gum's tenure as Art Director, the Suwon Philharmonic's annual performances grew from 10 to more than 60 concerts. In 1995, Samsung Electronics (headquartered in Suwon) constructed a new outdoor concert hall and rehearsal facilities for the Suwon Philharmonic. Samsung Electronics sponsored the orchestra and supported international tours, including performances at the 1998 Asian Games in Bangkok.

Since 1997, Gum has led the Euro-Asian Philharmonic Orchestra, later renamed the New World Philharmonic Orchestra. In addition to the New World Philharmonic, he served as the Art Director of the Gyeonggi Philharmonic Orchestra (2006–10) and the Incheon Philharmonic Orchestra (2010–14).

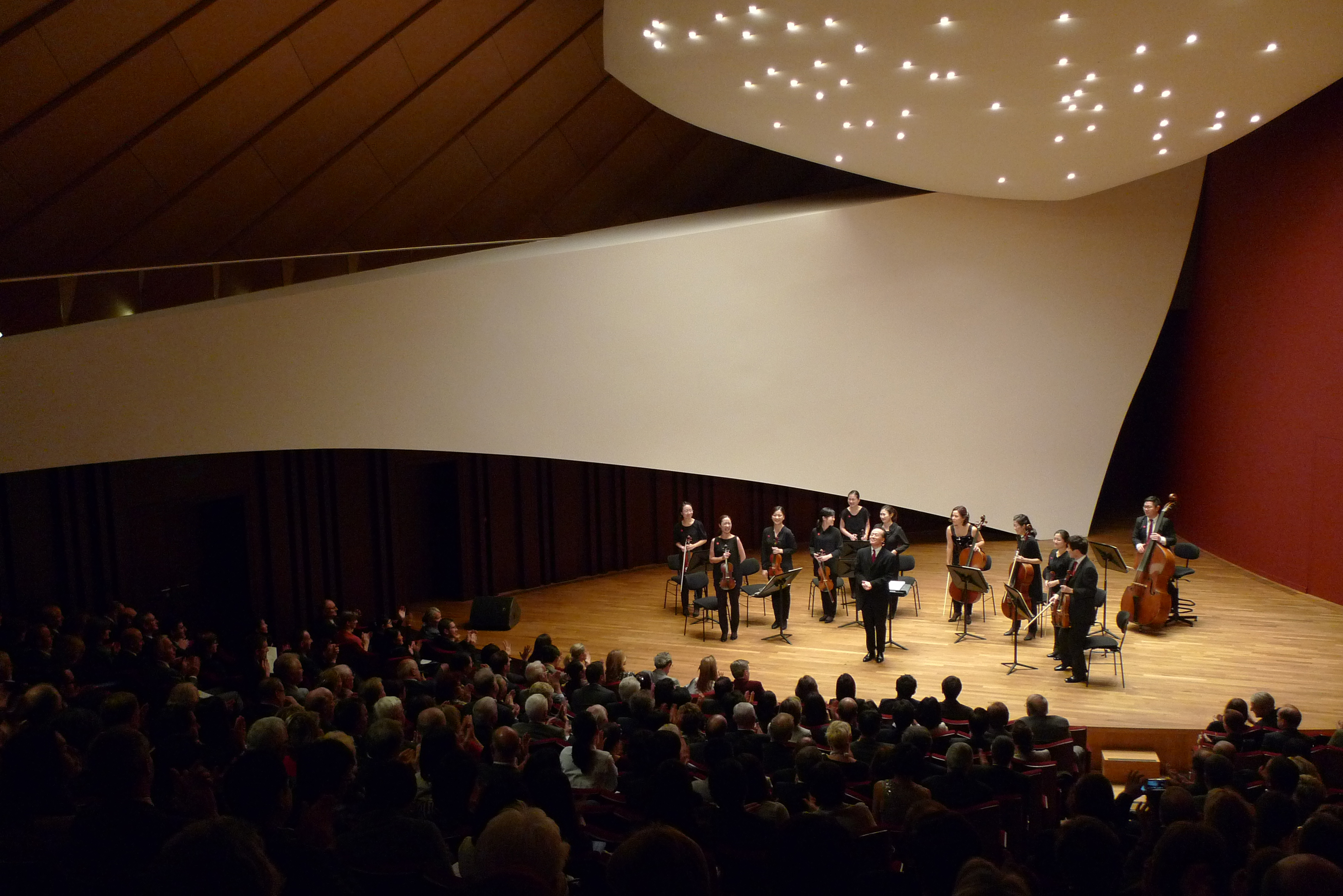
Conductor Gum Nanse and Camerata Salzburg at Salle de Musique de Chambre, Luxembourg in 2013

In 1999 he conducted a series of symphonic concerts in the lobby of the POSCO Center headquarters building in Seoul, which included complete symphonies by Beethoven, Tchaikovsky, and Brahms.

In recent years, Gum has been active as a festival director, founding the Music Isle Festival in Jeju in 2005 and the Manhattan Chamber Music Festival in 2012. The Music Isle Festival in Jeju became a member of the European Festivals Association (EFA) in 2010.

Gum served as the principal of Seoul Arts High School (Seoul Yego) until 2019 and regularly conducts the Korea United College Orchestra (KUCO), which consists of non-music major students from 25 universities nationwide. He also conducts the Korea Young Dream Orchestra (KYDO) annually, composed of young amateur musicians from 25 small provincial towns.

Gum is currently the artistic director of the Seongnam Philharmonic Orchestra and Hankyung Philharmonic Orchestra. In September 2015, he became the principal guest conductor of the Slovak Radio Symphony Orchestra.

Gum holds the following positions:

- Artistic director and conductor of the New World Philharmonic Orchestra – since 1997
- Artistic director and conductor of Seongnam Philharmonic Orchestra – since 2015
- Artistic director and conductor of Hankyung Philharmonic – since 2015
- Principal guest conductor of Slovak Radio Symphony Orchestra – since 2015
- Artistic director of Raum Art Center – since 2012
- Artistic director of Manhattan Chamber Music Festival – since 2012
- Artistic director of Jeju Music Isle Festival – since 2005
- Artistic director of Busan Chamber Music Festival – since 2014
- Artistic director of Euro-Asian Music Festival – since 2015
- Artistic director of Korea United College Orchestra (KUCO) – since 2010
- Artistic director of Korea Young Dream Orchestra (KYDO) – since 2011
- Chairman of Korea Orchestra Association (KOA) – since 2011
- Honorary Consul of Slovakia – since 2017
- Artistic Director of Gum Nanse Music Center (GMC) – since 2021

== Awards and honors ==
- 1977 – Herbert von Karajan Young Conductor's Competition, Fourth Prize
- 1995 – Order of Cultural Merit, Okgwan
- 1999 – Grand Prize of Korea Music Critics Association
- 2008 – Honorary Doctorate Degree from Keimyung University
- 2009 – Grand Prize of Performing Arts Management Association of Korea
- 2010 – Hyoryung Prize – Cultural sector
- 2011 – Presidential Prize of Sejong Cultural Award – Cultural Sector

== TV appearances ==
- 2010. 5. 19 MBC <황금어장-무릎팍도사>
- 2011 KBS Prime <Kids Classic Audition> / <키즈 클래식 오디션>
- 2012 KBS <Qualifications of Men> – Family Choir / <남자의 자격> 시즌 3 – 패밀리 합창단
- 2012. 12. 4 KBS <Kim Seungwoo's WinWin> – Episode 140 / <김승우의 승승장구> – 140회
- 2014–2015 tvN <Always Cantare> Season 1, 2 / <언제나 칸타레> 시즌 1,2

== Publications ==
- 《나는 작은새, 금난새》 Design House, 1996-12-31 ISBN 9788970410722
- 《금난새의 클래식 여행》 Think Tree, 2003-9-30 ISBN 9788984982840
- 《금난새의 클래식 여행 1》 Think Tree, 2006–10 ISBN 9788984986190
- 《금난새의 클래식 여행 2》 Think Tree, 2006–10 ISBN 9788984987098
- 《내가 사랑한 교향곡》 Think Tree, 2008-12-23 ISBN 9788984989238
- 《모든 가능성을 지휘하라》 Yaekyung, 2015-3-2 ISBN 9788970845272
- 《아버지와 아들의 교향곡》 Dasan Book, 2019-11-18 ISBN 9791130625935
