= Elisso Bolkvadze =

Minister of Culture of Autonomous Republic of Adjara

Elisso Bolkvadze ელისო ბოქლვაძე
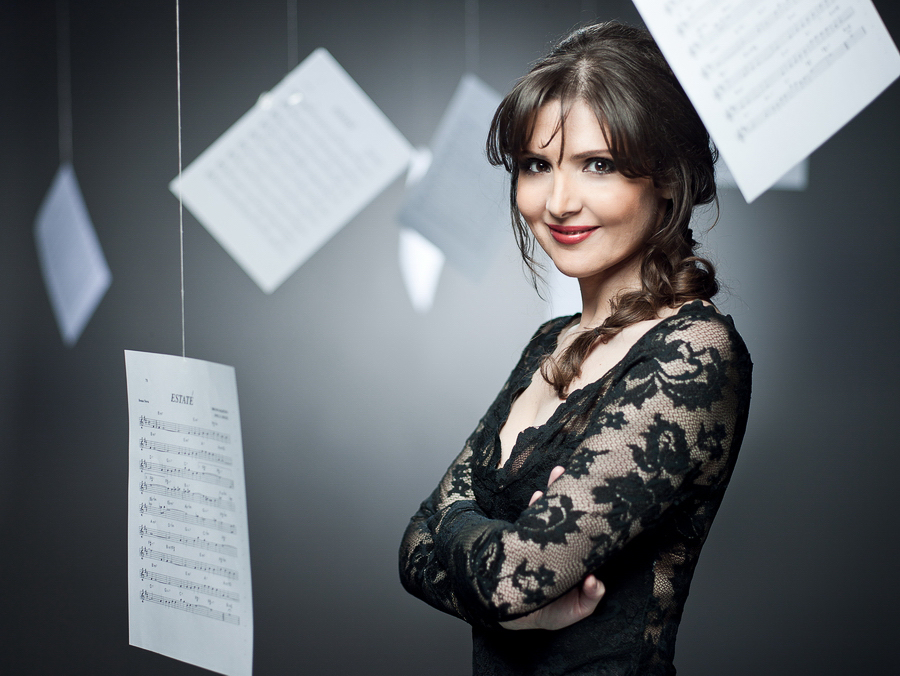

Background information
- Also known as: Elisso Bolkvadze
- Born: Eliso Bolkvadze; January 2, 1967 (age 59); Tbilisi, Georgia
- Origin: Tbilisi
- Genres: Classical music
- Occupation: Pianist
- Instrument: Piano
- Labels: Audite Musikproduktion; Discogs; Sony Classical Records
- Website: elisso-bolkvadze.com

Elisso Bolkvadze or Eliso Bolkvadze (Georgian: ელისო ბოლქვაძე) is a Georgian classical pianist born in Tbilisi, Georgia.

She has been a member of the Parliament of Georgia since 11 December 2020, for the ruling Georgian Dream party. As an MP, she has served as the chair of the Culture Committee. Since March 4, 2025, she has served as the Minister of Culture of the Autonomous Republic of Adjara.

== Life and activity ==
Elisso Bolkvadze comes from a literary family. She gave her first public concert at the age of seven. She studied in a special music school for gifted children in Tbilisi, and continued her study in the conservatory of Tbilisi with professor Tengiz Amirejibi, and at the same time she followed a master class with Professor Tatiana Nikolayeva in Moscow. Later she moved to Paris and continued her education with the composer and philosopher Michel Sogny in France and Austria.

== Musical career ==
=== Awards and recognitions ===
Elisso Bolkvadze has won some prizes at international piano competitions, such as second prize at Vianna da Motta International Music Competition in Lisbon (1987), 6th prize at Van Cliburn International Piano Competition in the United States (1989), best interpretation of French music at Long-Thibaud-Crespin Competition in Paris France, 1995), 3rd prize at Axa International Piano Competition in Dublin (1997), etc.

On October 7, 2015, she was awarded the Order of Arts and Literature, by France's Culture Minister Fleur Pellerin.

January 22, 2015, she became UNESCO Artist for Peace. This title was awarded to her by UNESCO General Director, Irina Bokova. Following her vote for a controversial law in 2023, widely seen as designed to repress civil society, a petition by the PEN Center of Georgia asking the UNESCO Secretary General to withdraw this title drew more than 100 signatures.

In 2018, she was also awarded "The Medal of Honor of the Georgian Government" by the Georgian president.

Elisso Bolkvadze was interviewed by the Piano Performer Magazine (USA) and was featured on the cover of the fall 20016 issue.

=== Concerts ===
Elisso has played sold out recitals and concerts throughout Europe, United States, Japan and China in major concert halls: such as John F. Kennedy Center for the Performing Arts (Washington) Pasadena Auditorium (Los Angeles), Orange County Convention Center, Salle Pleyel, Salle Gaveau, Théâtre des Champs Elysées in Paris, Gewandhaus Orchestra (Leipzig), Herkulessaal (Munich, Germany) Alte Oper (Frankfurt, Germany), Saint Petersburg Philharmonic Hall (Russia), Wiener Konzerthaus, Victoria Hall (Geneva), Cadogan Hall in London, Konzerthaus Berlin, Teatro Manzoni in Milan, Orchestra Hall, Chicago, Knight Concert Hall, etc.

In addition, Elisso Bolkvadze has performed with number of orchestras, including Qatar Philharmonic Orchestra, Lithuanian National Symphony Orchestra (Lithuania), National Philharmonic of Ukraine, Tiroler Symphonieorchester Innsbruck, Orchestre National de France, Dallas Symphony Orchestra and so on.

In June, 2018 Elisso performed at UNESCO Headquarters on the occasion of the 100th anniversary of the Proclamation of Independence of the Democratic Republic of Georgia.

Elisso Bolkvadze is also the Founder and Artistic Director of Batumi Black Sea Music and Art Festival in Georgia.

=== Labels ===
Elisso Bolkvadze has recorded a broad program for piano and orchestra by Ludwig van Beethoven, Pyotr Ilyich Tchaikovsky, Sergei Rachmaninoff, Camille Saint-Saëns and Franz Liszt for the label Sony Classical Records under the direction of Jansug Kakhidze. She also recorded a live recital at the Festival Michel Sogny in August 2007 for the Cascavelle label. In 2015 she recorded a new CD for the label Audite with the piece of Schubert and Prokofiev.

=== Selected recordings ===
- Prokofiev, Piano Sonata No.2 / Schubert, Impromptus D 899. Audite, 2015
- Récital au Festival Michel Sogny (Œuvres de Beethoven, Mozart, Ravel & Michel Sogny). Cascavelle, VEL 3129, Distribution Abeille Musique, 2007
- Camille Saint-Saëns, Piano Concerto Nº 2 / Fantasies, Liszt / Rhapsodie, Rachmaninov, Tbilisi Symphony Orchestra, conducted by Jansug Kakhidze. Cascavelle, 2010

=== Charity ===
In 2013, Elisso founded her own charitable music foundation, Lyra, with the mission of inspiring and promoting the young generation of Georgian classical pianists. The same year, she performed a recital "Piano for Peace" at Nobel Prize World Summit in Warsaw, in presence of Sharon Stone.

Elisso Bolkvadze gave the series of charity concerts for supporting Georgian children who have suffered from war as well to help individual patients and children affected by cancer.

In March 2017, she participated in a conference organized by United Nations General Assembly in Geneva with Angelina Jolie to honor the memory of Sérgio Vieira de Mello.
