= Khatia Buniatishvili =

Georgian-French concert pianist

Khatia Buniatishvili ხატია ბუნიათიშვილი
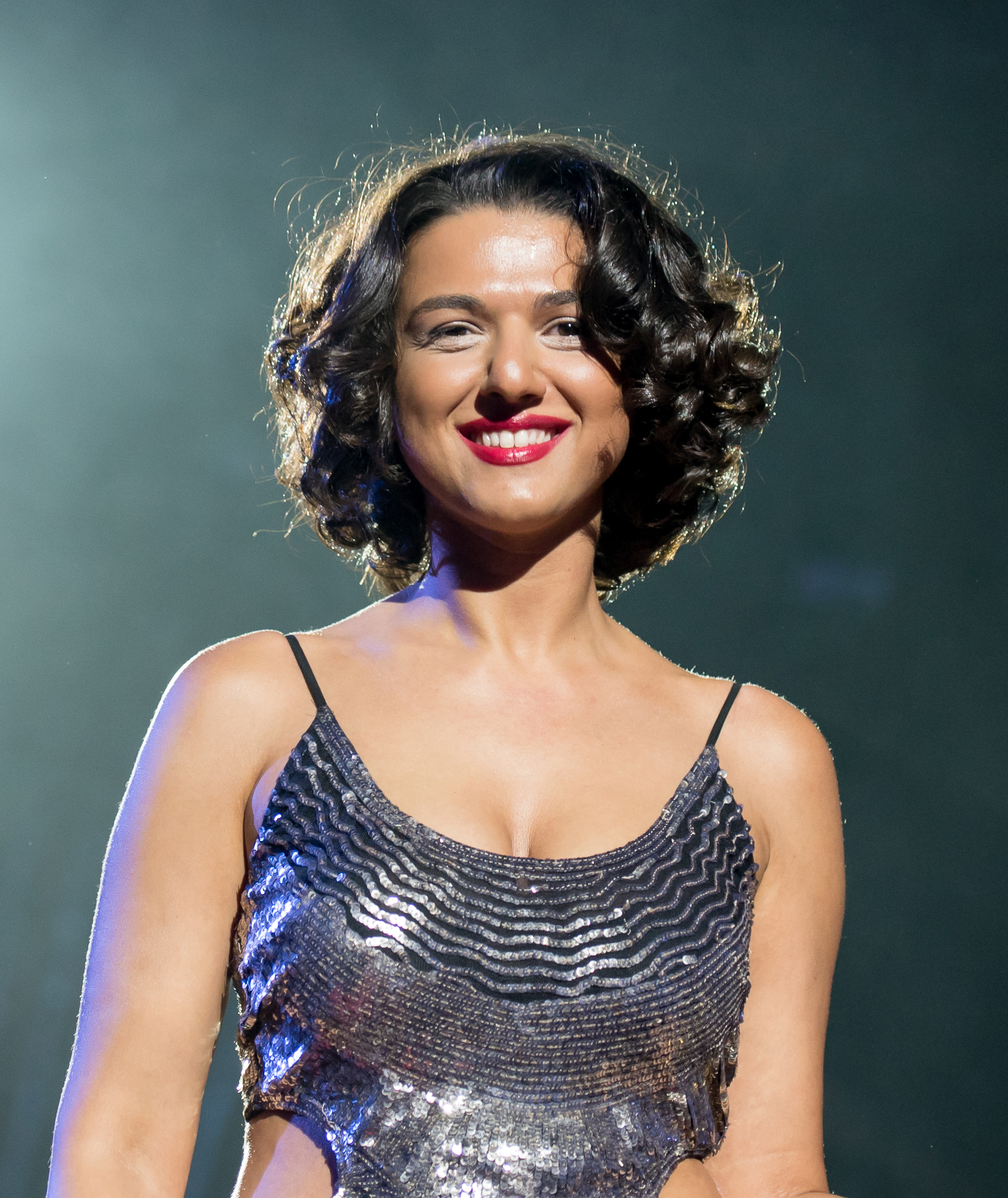
- Buniatishvili in 2017
- Born: 21 June 1987 (age 39); Batumi, Georgian Soviet Socialist Republic
- Occupation: Classical pianist
- Children: 1
- Website: khatiabuniatishvili.com

Khatia Buniatishvili (Georgian: ხატია ბუნიათიშვილი [χatʼia buniatʰiʃʷili]; born 21 June 1987) is a Georgian and French concert pianist.

== Early life and education ==
Born in 1987 in Batumi, Georgia, Khatia Buniatishvili began studying piano under her mother at the age of three. She gave her first concert with Tbilisi Chamber Orchestra when she was six and appeared internationally at age ten. She studied in Tbilisi with Tengiz Amirejibi and in Vienna with Oleg Maisenberg at the University of Music and Performing Arts Vienna.

Between the ages of eleven and fifteen, she left school in Georgia to follow intensive training with the French pianist and pedagogue of Hungarian origin Michel Sogny at the Villa Schindler in Austria, where she studied Sogny's innovative piano methodology.

Her older sister, Gvantsa Buniatishvili, is also a pianist, and they have played together on numerous occasions.

== Career ==
Buniatishvili signed with Sony Classical as an exclusive artist in 2010. Her 2011 debut album included Liszt's Sonata in B minor, Liebestraum No. 3, and Mephisto Waltz No. 1. Buniatishvili is a regular attendee of the Verbier Festival, where she performed Liszt's Sonata in B minor in 2011.

In 2012, Buniatishvili released her second album, Chopin, which featured solo piano works as well as Chopin's Piano Concerto No. 2 accompanied by the Orchestre de Paris and Paavo Järvi. The Guardian reported, "This is playing straight from the heart from one of today's most exciting and technically gifted young pianists."

On 7 December 2024, she was one of the featured artists who performed at the reopening of Notre-Dame de Paris.

== Discography ==
- 2011 – Franz Liszt, solo piano album (Sony Classical) OCLC 741021791
- 2012 – Chopin, with the Orchestre de Paris, conducted by Paavo Järvi (Sony Classical) OCLC 936044843
- 2014 – Motherland, solo piano album (Sony Classical)
- 2016 – Kaleidoscope, solo piano album (Sony Classical) OCLC 951603042
- 2016 – Liszt Beethoven, with the Israel Philharmonic Orchestra, conducted by Zubin Mehta (Sony Classical) OCLC 1441808778
- 2017 – Rachmaninoff, with the Czech Philharmonic, conducted by Paavo Järvi (Sony Classical) OCLC 1023627471
- 2019 – Schubert, solo piano album (Sony Classical) OCLC 1100419156
- 2020 – Labyrinth, solo piano album (Sony Classical) OCLC 1246179245
- 2024 – Mozart Piano Concertos Nos. 20 & 23, with the Academy of St Martin in the Fields (Sony Classical) OCLC 1506243772
