= List of music venues in Asia =

1,000+ capacity music venues

This is a list of music venues in Asia. Venues with a capacity of 1,000 or higher are included.

== List ==
=== Bahrain ===
Opened	Venue	City	Capacity
June 2020	Al Dana Amphitheatre	Sakhir	10,000

=== Brunei ===
Opened	Venue	City	Capacity
July 16, 1996	Jerudong Park Amphitheater	Bandar Seri Begawan	60,000+

=== Cambodia ===
Opened	Venue	City	Capacity
1964	Phnom Penh Olympic Stadium	Phnom Penh	50,000

=== China ===
Opened	Venue	City	Capacity
Mainland China
2007	National Center for the Performing Arts	Beijing	2,416 (Opera Hall); 2,017 (Music Hall); 1,040 (Theater Hall)
September 1959	Great Hall of the People	Beijing	10,000
1961	Workers' Gymnasium	Beijing	13,000
November 26, 2007	National Indoor Stadium	Beijing	18,000
January 11, 2008	Cadillac Arena	Beijing	19,000
June 28, 2008	National Stadium	Beijing	80,000
2016	Hunan International Convention & Exhibition Center	Changsha	Unknown
1991	Helong Sports Center	Changsha	55,000
2008	Xincheng Gymnasium	Changzhou	6,200
2008	Changzhou Olympic Sports Centre	Changzhou	38,000
December 28, 1991	Sichuan Provincial Gymnasium	Chengdu	7,000
December 28, 1991	Chengdu Sports Centre	Chengdu	42,000
2014	Chongqing International Convention & Exhibition Center	Chongqing	Unknown
1951	Dalian People's Culture Club	Dalian	1,000
October 2, 2013	Damai Center	Dalian	18,000
July 3, 2013	Dalian Sports Center Stadium	Dalian	61,000
2014	Bank of Dongguan Basketball Center	Dongguan	15,000
2006	Lingan Mingzhu Gymnasium	Foshan	8,324
2006	Century Lotus Stadium	Foshan	36,686
1989	Fuzhou Stadium	Fuzhou	30,000
June 30, 2001	Guangzhou Gymnasium	Guangzhou	10,000
September 30, 2010	Guangzhou International Sports Arena	Guangzhou	18,000
2000	Guangdong Stadium	Guangzhou	80,012
September 21, 2003	Huanglong Gymnasium	Hangzhou	8,000
2000	Huanglong Sports Center Stadium	Hangzhou	51,000
2017	Hangzhou Sports Park Stadium	Hangzhou	80,000
2004	Harbin International Convention and Exhibition Center Gymnasium	Harbin	10,603
1996	Harbin International Convention Exhibition and Sports Center Stadium	Harbin	48,000
Unknown	Binhu International Convention & Exhibition Center	Hefei	10,000
2008	Hefei Olympic Sports Center Stadium	Hefei	60,000
Unknown	Inner Mongolia Arena	Hohhot	6,000
2010	Jiangyin Stadium	Jiangyin	30,161
1979	Shandong Arena	Jinan	8,800
2009	Jinan Olympic Sports Center Gymnasium	Jinan	12,226
2009	Luoyang Stadium	Luoyang	39,888
1995	Nangang Gymnasium	Nangang	6,000
2012	Guangxi Gymnasium	Nanjing	9,247
2005	Nanjing Olympic Sports Center Gymnasium	Nanjing	13,000
2010	Guangxi Sports Center	Nanjing	60,000
2009	Conson Gymnasium	Qingdao	12,500
1997	Guoxin Stadium	Qingdao	45,000
2008	Quanzhou Sports Center	Quanzhou	34,000
1988	Shandong Provincial Stadium	Shandong	43,700
1976	Shanghai Indoor Stadium	Shanghai	10,000
October 5, 2005	Qizhong Forest Sports City Arena	Shanghai	13,779
2010	Mercedes-Benz Arena	Shanghai	18,000
1976	Hongkou Football Stadium	Shanghai	35,000
March 14, 1999	Shanghai Stadium	Shanghai	80,000
2007	Liaoning Gymnasium	Shenyang	10,000
2007	Shenyang Olympic Sports Centre Stadium	Shenyang	60,000
2011	Shenzhen Bay Sports Center	Shenzhen	12,793
2011	Shenzhen Bay Sports Stadium	Shenzhen	20,000
1993	Shenzhen Stadium	Shenzhen	32,500
2002	Suhzou Sports Center Arena	Suzhou	6,000
2018	Suzhou Industrial Park Sports Center	Suzhou	13,000
2002	Suzhou Sports Center Stadium	Suzhou	35,000
1995	Tianjin Arena	Tianjin	10,000
2007	Tianjin Olympic Centre	Tianjin	54,696
2002	Hongshan Arena	Ürümqi	3,800
Unknown	Wenzhou Sports Center	Wenzhou	20,000
January 19, 2007	Wuhan Sports Center Gymnasium	Wuhan	13,000
1954	Xinhua Road Sports Center	Wuhan	22,100
Unknown	Xiamen Sports Centre Stadium	Xiamen	32,000
1999	Shaanxi iRENA	Xi'an	50,100
Unknown	Xuzhou Olympic Sports Centre Stadium	Xuzhou	35,000
2013	Yanji Stadium	Yanji	30,000
Unknown	Zhengzhou International Convention & Exhibition	Zhengzhou	10,000
Unknown	Henan Provincial Sports Center Stadium	Zhengzhou	48,000
1991	Zhongshan Sports Center Stadium	Zhongshan	12,000
Hong Kong
October 14, 2025	TIDES	Hong Kong	1,500
1989	Hong Kong Cultural Centre	Hong Kong	2,019 (Concert Hall); 1,734 (Grand Theatre)
1997	Hong Kong Convention and Exhibition Centre	Hong Kong	3,800 (Grand Hall)
1981	Hong Kong Coliseum	Hong Kong	12,500
August 27, 1980	Queen Elizabeth Stadium	Hong Kong	3,500
December 21, 2005	AsiaWorld–Arena	Hong Kong	14,000
September 7, 1953 (reopened 2013)	MacPherson Stadium	Hong Kong	1,850
June 12, 2013	East Kowloon Cruise Terminal Outdoor Activities Square	Hong Kong	20,000
March 1, 2025	Kai Tak Sports Park	Hong Kong	50,000
Macau
February 13, 2018	MGM Cotai Dynamic Theatre	Macau	2,000
October 27, 2015	Studio City Events Center	Macau	5,242
April 8, 2007	Venetian Arena	Macau	13,000
August 8, 2005	Macau East Asian Games Dome	Macau	7,000 (Pavilion 1); 2,000 (Pavilion 2)
2021	Galaxy Arena	Macau	16,000
December 28, 2024	Macau Outdoor Performance Area	Macau	50,000

=== India ===
Opened	Venue	City	Capacity
February 24, 2020	Narendra Modi Stadium	Ahmedabad	132,000
1993	Jawaharlal Nehru Indoor Stadium	Chennai	8,000
1994	Abhay Prashal Indoor Stadium	Indore	10,000
1975	Netaji Indoor Stadium	Kolkata	12,500
1957	Sardar Vallabhbhai Patel Indoor Stadium	Mumbai	5,000
Unknown	Jio Garden	Mumbai	11,000
1883	Mahalaxmi Racecourse	Mumbai	50,000
March 4, 2008	DY Patil Stadium	Mumbai	56,000
1977	MMRDA Grounds	Mumbai	60,000
2014	Vivekananda Nagar Indoor Sports Complex	Nagpur	5,000
1982	Indira Gandhi Arena	New Delhi	14,348
1982	Jawaharlal Nehru Stadium	New Delhi	60,000
1976	Shri Krishna Memorial Hall	Patna	2,000

=== Indonesia ===
Opened	Venue	City	Capacity
1992	Garuda Wisnu Kencana Cultural Park	Bali	12,500
Unknown	Taman Bhagawan	Bali	4,000
1985	Eldorado Dome	Bandung	6,000
2005	Sentul International Convention Center	Bogor	11,000
2009	Aula Simfonia	Jakarta	1,200
March 11, 1973	Balai Sarbini	Jakarta	1,300
2016	The Pallas	Jakarta	2,000–2,400
2017	The Establishment	Jakarta	2,500
2018	SCBD Lot 8 Livespace	Jakarta	2,500
2011	Skenoo Hall	Jakarta	3,000
2014	Kuningan City Ballroom	Jakarta	3,000
Unknown	The BritAma Arena	Jakarta	4,000
1993	Tennis Indoor Senayan	Jakarta	3,750
2019	JIExpo Theatre	Jakarta	2,447
Unknown	Kota Kasablanka Hall	Jakarta	5,500
May 21, 1961	Istora Gelora Bung Karno	Jakarta	7,166
1973	Jakarta International Velodrome	Jakarta	8,500
December 1961	Gelora Bung Karno Madya Stadium	Jakarta	9,170
1974	Jakarta International Convention Center	Jakarta	10,000
2010	Jakarta International Expo	Jakarta	12,000
August 7, 2023	Indonesia Arena	Jakarta	16,500
2012; reopened 2022	Beach City International Stadium	Jakarta	20,053
July 24, 1962	Gelora Bung Karno Stadium	Jakarta	77,193
2022	Jakarta International Stadium	Jakarta	82,000
Unknown	De Tjolomadoe	Karanganyar	4,000
2008	Celebes Convention Center	Makassar	15,000
1971	Palembang Sport and Convention Center	Palembang	4,000
Unknown	Sam Poo Kong	Semarang	Unknown
August 9, 2015	Indonesia Convention Exhibition	South Tangerang	18,000
July 25, 2008	DBL Arena	Surabaya	4,000
2009	Grand City Convention Center	Surabaya	5,000
Unknown	Dyandra Convention Center	Surabaya	5,000
Unknown	Edutorium UMS	Surakarta	15,000
Unknown	Benteng Vastenburg	Surakarta	20,000
Unknown	Jogja Expo Center	Yogyakarta	9,700
Unknown	Stadion Kridosono	Yogyakarta	15,000

=== Israel ===
Opened	Venue	City	Capacity
1985	Malha Arena	Jerusalem	2,000
1956	Ussishkin Auditorium	Jerusalem	3,104
2014	Pais Arena	Jerusalem	15,000
1992	Teddy Stadium	Jerusalem	31,733
1957	Charles Bronfman Auditorium	Tel Aviv	2,412
2014	Shlomo Group Arena	Tel Aviv	3,504
1963	Menora Mivtachim Arena	Tel Aviv	5,941
1959	Expo Tel Aviv	Tel Aviv	10,000
1962	Bloomfield Stadium	Tel Aviv	29,400
1973	Yarkon Park	Tel Aviv	100,000

=== Japan ===
Opened	Venue	City	Capacity
February 2, 1975	Asahikawa Civic Culture Hall	Asahikawa	1,546 (Main hall)
1968	Akita Prefectural Gymnasium	Akita	6,000
November 2, 1982	Link Station Hall	Aomori	2,031
April 2024	LaLa Arena Tokyo-Bay	Chiba	Approx 11,000
February 2, 1990	Zozo Marine Stadium	Chiba	29,645
October 9, 1989	Makuhari Messe	Chiba	9,000 (Makuhari Event Hall); 200,000 (Entire complex)
1995	Sun Dome Fukui	Echizen	9,000
1994	Rose Theater	Fuji	1,630
September 23, 1997	Harmony Hall	Fukui	1,456
November 9, 1985	Phoenix Plaza	Fukui	2,000 (Large hall)
December 7, 2018	Zepp Fukuoka	Fukuoka	1,526
May 1, 1981	Fukuoka Sunpalace	Fukuoka	2,316
April 2, 1993	Marine Messe	Fukuoka	15,000
1993	Mizuho PayPay Dome Fukuoka	Fukuoka	40,142
December 14, 2001	Ecopa Arena	Fukuroi	10,000
Unknown	Okinawa Convention Center	Ginowan	5,000
1993	ACT City Hamamatsu	Hamamatsu	2,336
1990	Hamamatsu Arena	Hamamatsu	8,000
October 12, 1985	Bunka Gakuen HBG Hall	Hiroshima	2,100
September 1985	Hiroshima Sun Plaza	Hiroshima	6,052
1994	Hiroshima Green Arena	Hiroshima	10,000
June 5, 1994	Sun Arena	Ise	11,000
1992	Kagoshima Arena	Kagoshima	5,700
July 1, 2004	Muza Kawasaki Symphony Hall	Kawasaki	1,997
1973	Kobe Culture Hall	Kobe	2,043
1956	Kobe International House	Kobe	2,112
1984	World Memorial Hall	Kobe	8,000
March 1, 2025	Glion Arena Kobe	Kobe	10,000
March 6, 1988	Hotto Motto Field Kobe	Kobe	35,000
August 1, 1924	Hanshin Koshien Stadium	Kobe	47,359
September 2019	Kumamoto Castle Hall	Kumamoto	2,304 (Main hall)
1995	Kyoto Concert Hall	Kyoto	1,833
March 21, 1966	Kyoto International Conference Center	Kyoto	1,840 (Main hall)
April 29, 1960	Kyoto Kaikan	Kyoto	2,005
1990	Yamada Green Dome Maebashi	Maebashi	20,000
July 10, 1965	Matsuyama Civic Center	Matsuyama	1,845 (Large hall)
October 2, 1996	Shimin Bunka Hall	Miyazaki	1,867 (Main hall)
December 10, 1995	Big Hat	Nagano	8,000
1996	M-Wave	Nagano	20,000
October 1, 1998	Benex Brick Hall	Nagasaki	2,002
1992	Diamond Hall	Nagoya	1,014
March 11, 2005	Zepp Nagoya	Nagoya	1,864
October 1, 1972	Niterra Civic Hall	Nagoya	2,291 (Forest Hall); 1,146 (Village Hall)
October 30, 1992	Aichi Prefectural Arts Theater	Nagoya	2,480
1989	Nagoya Congress Center	Nagoya	3,012
July 19, 1987	Nippon Gaishi Hall	Nagoya	10,000
August 30, 2019	Aichi Sky Expo	Nagoya	10,000
November 1973	Port Messe	Nagoya	12,000
July 13, 2025	IG Arena	Nagoya	17,000
March 15, 1997	Vantelin Dome	Nagoya	48,819
November 21, 1967	Niigata Prefectural Civic Center	Niigata	1,730
1998	Ryutopia	Niigata	1,890
May 1, 2003	Toki Messe	Niigata	10,000
October 22, 2005	Hyogo Performing Arts Center	Nishinomiya	2,001
October 18, 1998	iichiko Gran Theater	Oita	1,966
March 2001	Crasus Dome Oita	Oita	40,000
September 23, 1991	Okayama Symphony Hall	Okayama	2,001
1982	Okayama General and Cultural Gymnasium	Okayama	8,000
November 3, 2001	NHK Osaka Hall	Osaka	1,417
April 14, 1968	Orix Theater	Osaka	2,400
2012	Zepp Namba	Osaka	2,513
April 3, 2013	Festival Hall	Osaka	2,700
April 1, 2000	Grand Cube Osaka	Osaka	2,754
February 17, 2017	Zepp Osaka Bayside	Osaka	2,801
May 1, 1985	Intex Osaka	Osaka	5,000
April 1996	Asue Arena Osaka	Osaka	10,000
October 1, 1983	Osaka-jō Hall	Osaka	16,000
March 1, 1997	Kyocera Dome	Osaka	55,000
September 5, 1998	Biwako Hall	Otsu	1,848 (Main theatre)
April 1997	Sekisui Heim Super Arena	Rifu	7,063
1988	Omiya Sonic City	Saitama	2,505
September 1, 2000	Saitama Super Arena	Saitama	37,000
October 1, 2001	Saitama Stadium 2002	Saitama	63,700
July 4, 1997	Sapporo Concert Hall	Sapporo	2,008
April 12, 1998	Zepp Sapporo	Sapporo	2,009
September 20, 1999	Hokkai Kitayell	Sapporo	10,000
1972	Makomanai Ice Arena	Sapporo	13,000
March 14, 2023	Es Con Field Hokkaido	Sapporo	35,000
June 3, 2001	Sapporo Dome	Sapporo	53,820
June 1991	Sendai Sun Plaza	Sendai	2,710
1984	Kamei Arena Sendai	Sendai	5,705
November 1, 1993	Tokorozawa Civic Cultural Centre Muse	Tokorozawa	2,002
2020	Pavilion Tokorozawa Sakura Town	Tokorozawa	2,405
April 14, 1979	Belluna Dome	Tokorozawa	31,552
1982	Bunka Plaza Sun Hall	Toki	1,506
April 17, 2023	Zepp Shinjuku	Tokyo	1,500
October 8, 1994	The Garden Hall	Tokyo	1,500
October 1997	Sumida Triphony Hall	Tokyo	1,801
1964 (Original); October 13, 2019 (Current)	Shibuya Public Hall	Tokyo	1,956
October 30, 1990	Tokyo Metropolitan Theatre	Tokyo	1,999
October 12, 1986	Suntory Hall	Tokyo	2,006
April 7, 1961	Tokyo Bunka Kaikan	Tokyo	2,303
2012	Zepp Diver City	Tokyo	2,473
July 18, 2020	Zepp Haneda	Tokyo	2,925
March 19, 2008	Tokyo Dome City Hall	Tokyo	3,190
June 20, 1937	NHK Hall	Tokyo	3,601
1997	Tokyo International Forum	Tokyo	5,012 (Hall A); 1,502 (Hall C)
June 17, 2020	Tokyo Garden Theatre	Tokyo	8,000
November 25, 2017	Musashino Forest Sport Plaza	Tokyo	10,000
October 3, 2025	Toyota Arena Tokyo	Tokyo	10,000
1987	Ariake Coliseum	Tokyo	10,008
January 9, 1985	Ryōgoku Kokugikan	Tokyo	11,098
1964	Yoyogi National Stadium	Tokyo	12,934
October 3, 1964	Nippon Budokan	Tokyo	14,501
February 3, 2020	Ariake Arena	Tokyo	15,000
March 10, 2001	Ajinomoto Stadium	Tokyo	48,013
March 17, 1988	Tokyo Dome	Tokyo	55,000
December 21, 2019	Japan National Stadium	Tokyo	80,000
1993	Aubade Hall	Toyama	2,196
July 20, 1997	Wakayama Big Whale	Wakayama	8,500
May 12, 2020	Yamagin Kenmin Hall	Yamagata	2,001
March 7, 2020	KT Zepp Yokohama	Yokohama	2,146
August 22, 1991	Pacifico Yokohama	Yokohama	5,002 (National Convention Hall)
July 10, 2020	Pia Arena MM	Yokohama	12,141
April 1, 1989	Yokohama Arena	Yokohama	17,000
September 29, 2023	K-Arena Yokohama	Yokohama	20,033
April 4, 1978	Yokohama Stadium	Yokohama	32,000
April 1, 1998	Nissan Stadium	Yokohama	72,000
Unknown	Naeba Ski Resort	Yuzawa	30,000+

=== Kazakhstan ===
Opened	Venue	City	Capacity
August 5, 2015	Barys Arena	Astana	11,500
July 3, 2009	Astana Arena	Astana	30,224
September 18, 2016	Almaty Arena	Almaty	12,000

=== Kyrgyzstan ===
Opened	Venue	City	Capacity
August 31, 2026	Bishkek Arena	Bishkek	51,000

=== Lebanon ===
Opened	Venue	City	Capacity
November 28, 2001	Beirut International Exhibition & Leisure Center	Beirut	32,000
1957	Camille Chamoun Sports City Stadium	Beirut	49,500
1996	Casino du Liban	Jounieh	1,000
1964	Fouad Shehab Stadium	Jounieh	5,000
Unknown	Platea	Sarba	10,000

=== Malaysia ===
Opened	Venue	City	Capacity
1998	Arena of Stars	Pahang	6,000
2005	KL Live	Kuala Lumpur	2,000
May 26, 2022	Zepp Kuala Lumpur	Kuala Lumpur	2,414
2005	Plenary Hall	Kuala Lumpur	3,000
1997	Mega Star Arena KL	Kuala Lumpur	5,000
April 19, 1962	Stadium Negara	Kuala Lumpur	10,000
November 23, 2016	MITEC Hall	Kuala Lumpur	10,000
1998	Unifi Arena	Kuala Lumpur	16,000
1998	National Hockey Stadium	Kuala Lumpur	18,000
August 21, 1957	Stadium Merdeka	Kuala Lumpur	20,000
September 11, 1996	Bukit Jalil National Stadium	Kuala Lumpur	87,411
2000	SPICE Arena	Penang	18,000

=== Myanmar ===
Opened	Venue	City	Capacity
Unknown	Myanmar Event Park	Yangon	11,000

=== Philippines ===
Opened	Venue	City	Capacity
Unknown	SMX Convention Center Clark	Angeles	450 - 1,000
Unknown	La Salle Coliseum	Bacolod	8,000
April 1998; March 30, 2023	Panaad Stadium	Bacolod	20,000
July 21, 2014	Philippine Sports Stadium	Bulacan	25,000
July 21, 2014	Philippine Arena	Bulacan	55,000
October 12, 2019	New Clark City Athletics Stadium	Capas	20,000
1962	Cebu Coliseum	Cebu City	5,000
January 11, 1998	Waterfront Cebu City Hotel & Casino	Cebu City	7,000
June 2026	SM Seaside Cebu Arena	Cebu City	25,000
Unknown	SMX Convention Center Davao	Davao City	4,500
September 2026	KJC King Dome	Davao City	75,000
February 24, 2023	Marcos Stadium	Laoag	12,000
1976	National Arts Center	Los Baños	1,000
1997	Makati Coliseum	Makati	3,000
Unknown	Metro Concert Bar	Manila	1,000
September 8, 1969	Nicanor Abelardo Theater	Manila	1,853
1989	Ninoy Aquino Stadium	Manila	6,000
1934	Rizal Memorial Coliseum	Manila	8,000
1934	Rizal Memorial Stadium	Manila	~50,000
1946	Quirino Grandstand	Manila	10,000 (Grandstand); ~500,000 (Grounds)
November 5, 2007	SMX Convention Center Manila	Manila	10,240
March 16, 2013	The Theater at Solaire	Parañaque	1,740
2007	SMDC Concert Grounds	Parañaque	~100,000
2009	SM Sky Dome	Quezon City	1,500
May 27, 1967	New Frontier Theater	Quezon City	2,385
November 1998	The Crossroads Center	Quezon City	2,500
March 16, 1960	Araneta Coliseum	Quezon City	20,000
August 28, 2009	Newport Performing Arts Center	Pasay	1,500
September 5, 1976	Philippine International Convention Center	Pasay	3,814 (Plenary Hall); 3,996 (Reception Hall)
1993	Cuneta Astrodome	Pasay	12,000
July 16, 2012	Mall of Asia Arena	Pasay	20,000
October 28, 1996	World Trade Center Metro Manila	Pasay	9,697 (Event Hall)
c 2009	SM Mall of Asia Concert Grounds	Pasay	80,000
May 17, 2013	Samsung Hall	Taguig	1,000
1901	Fort Bonifacio Open Field	Taguig	~70,000
2010	Jesse M. Robredo Coliseum	Naga City	12,000
2006	Tacloban City Convention Center	Tacloban	4,500
2002	Mayor Vitaliano D. Agan Coliseum	Zamboanga City	10,000

=== Qatar ===
Opened	Venue	City	Capacity
December 4, 2011	Qatar National Convention Center	Doha	2,300 (Theatre) 4,000 (Conference Hall)
2014	Ali Bin Hamad al-Attiyah Arena	Doha	7,700
2005	Aspire Dome	Doha	15,500
March 3, 1976	Khalifa International Stadium	Doha	40,000
2014	Lusail Sports Arena	Lusail	15,300

=== Saudi Arabia ===
Opened	Venue	City	Capacity
N/A	F1 Concert Zone	Jeddah	19,000
2021	Jeddah Corniche Circuit	Jeddah	50,000
2012	King Abdullah Sports City Arena	Jeddah	62,345
N/A	Bakr al-Sheddi Theater	Riyadh	2,000
October 17, 2019	BLVD International Festival Site	Riyadh	40,000
N/A	BanBan	Riyadh	50,000
N/A	Azimuth Canyon	Al-'Ula	200,000

=== Singapore ===
Opened	Venue	City	Capacity
1820s	The Padang	Central Area	90,000
October 15, 1965	Singapore Conference Hall	Downtown Core	1,000
Unknown	University Cultural Center	Downtown Core	2,000
2013	Level 6 Auditorium	Downtown Core	10,000
February 23, 1970	Kallang Theatre	Kallang	1,744
December 31, 1989	Singapore Indoor Stadium	Kallang	12,000
June 30, 2014	Singapore National Stadium	Kallang	55,000
December 31, 1989	Esplanade Concert Hall	Marina Bay	1,600
April 27, 2010	Sands Theater	Marina Bay	1,677
April 27, 2010	Esplanade Arts Theater	Marina Bay	2,000
April 27, 2010	Grand Theater	Marina Bay	2,155
April 27, 2010	Sands Grand Ballroom	Marina Bay	6,000
2027	NS Square	Marina Bay	30,000
August 31, 2008	Marina Bay Street Circuit	Marina Bay	90,000
November 1, 2012	Star Performing Arts Centre	Queenstown	5,108
Unknown	SCAPE The Ground Theater	River Valley	2,500
January 20, 2010	Festival Grand Theatre	Sentosa	1,600
September 15, 2005	Arena @ Expo	Tampines	6,700

=== South Korea ===
Opened	Venue	City	Capacity
2008	Yi Sun-sin Sports Complex	Asan	19,283
unknown	BEXCO Auditorium	Busan	4,002
1985	Sajik Arena	Busan	14,099
1985	Sajik Baseball Stadium	Busan	26,800
2001	Asiad Main Stadium	Busan	53,864
1980	Masan Gymnasium	Changwon	5,000
1980	Masan Stadium	Changwon	21,484
2001	Ryu Gwangsun Gymnasium	Cheonan	6,000
2001	Cheonan Baeksok Stadium	Cheonan	30,000
1991	Daegu Culture & Arts Center	Daegu	1,013
1948	Daegu Baseball Stadium	Daegu	5,000
June 28, 2001	Daegu Stadium	Daegu	66,422
1970	Chungmu Gymnasium	Daejeon	6,000
1964	Daejeon Hanbat Baseball Stadium	Daejeon	13,000
2001	Daejeon World Cup Stadium	Daejeon	40,535
2005	KINTEX Hall 6	Goyang	6,000
2003	Goyang Sports Complex	Goyang	40,311
2013	Kia Champions Field	Gwangju	27,000
2001	Gwangju World Cup Stadium	Gwangju	44,118
2006	Samsan World Gymnasium	Incheon	7,220
November 30, 2023	Inspire Arena	Incheon	15,000
2001	Incheon SSG Landers Field	Incheon	26,000
2002	Munhak Stadium	Incheon	50,256
December 9, 2001	Jeju World Cup Stadium	Jeju	35,657
1973	Jeonju Indoor Gymnasium	Jeonju	4,730
2001	Jeonju World Cup Stadium	Jeonju	42,477
June 8, 2005	Sangmu Gymnasium	Seongnam	5,000
Unknown	COEX Convention & Exhibition Center	Seoul	1,080 (Auditorium); 7,500 (Hall D)
2000	LG Arts Center	Seoul	1,103
November 25, 2023	Myunghwa Live Hall	Seoul	1,500
April 29, 1950	Haeorum Theater	Seoul	1,563
September 7, 1991	KBS Hall	Seoul	1,824
June 22, 2011	Olympic Hall	Seoul	2,452
2015	Yes24 Live Hall	Seoul	2,500
1999	Sejong Center	Seoul	3,000
Unknown	Grand Peace Palace Theatre	Seoul	4,500
1977	Seoul Students Gymnasium	Seoul	5,000
June 8, 2005	Seoul National University Gymnasium	Seoul	5,000
June 8, 2005	Ticketlink Live Arena	Seoul	6,500
1997	Jamsil Students' Gymnasium	Seoul	7,500
1989	Mokdong Baseball Stadium	Seoul	10,500
April 18, 1979	Jamsil Arena	Seoul	11,069
April 30, 1986	Olympic Gymnastics Arena	Seoul	15,000
1989	Mokdong Stadium	Seoul	20,236
September 15, 2015	Gocheok Sky Dome	Seoul	25,000
1982	Jamsil Baseball Stadium	Seoul	25,553
November 20, 2001	Seoul World Cup Stadium	Seoul	66,704
September 29, 1984	Olympic Stadium	Seoul	69,950
1 August 2009	Gwanghwamun Square	Seoul	~260,000
1963	Suwon Gymnasium	Suwon	9,000
1988	KT Wiz Park	Suwon	20,000
1971	Suwon Sports Complex	Suwon	30,000
2001	Suwon World Cup Stadium	Suwon	43,959
2001	Dongchun Gymnasium	Ulsan	5,831

=== Syria ===
Opened	Venue	City	Capacity
May 7, 2004	Damascus Opera House	Damascus	1,331

=== Taiwan ===
Opened	Venue	City	Capacity
2005	Hsinchu County Indoor Stadium	Hsinchu	8,000
2005	Hsinchu County Stadium	Hsinchu	15,000
2008	Kaohsiung Arena	Kaohsiung	15,000
2009	National Stadium	Kaohsiung	55,000
2021	Kaohsiung Music Center	Kaohsiung	6,800 (Indoor); 12,000 (Outdoor)
July 31, 2020	Zepp New Taipei	New Taipei City	2,245
2001	New Taipei City Exhibition Hall	New Taipei City	7,000-8,000
2014	Legacy Taichung	Taichung	1,200
September 30, 2016	National Taichung Theater	Taichung	2,014
August 5, 2006	Fulfillment Amphitheater	Taichung	15,000
1998	Tainan County Stadium	Tainan	30,000
2001	National Taiwan University Sports Center	Taipei	4,200
September 5, 2020	Taipei Music Center	Taipei	6,300 (Indoor); 15,000 (Outdoor)
1989	TICC Plenary Hall	Taipei	3,122
2002	Xinzhuang Gymnasium	Taipei	7,125
2008	Nangang Exhibition Center	Taipei	12,000
October 19, 1997	Xinzhuang Baseball Stadium	Taipei	12,500
2005	Taipei Arena	Taipei	15,350
2009	Taipei Municipal Stadium	Taipei	20,000
2009	Legacy Taipei	Taipei	1,200
2017	Legacy Max	Taipei	1,800
1987	Banqiao Stadium	Taipei	30,000
2023	Taipei Dome	Taipei	50,000
2024	Messe Taoyuan	Taoyuan	8,800
2009	Rakuten Taoyuan Baseball Stadium	Taoyuan	20,000
1993	Taoyuan City Stadium	Taoyuan	30,000

=== Thailand ===
Opened	Venue	City	Capacity
October 9, 1987	Thailand Cultural Centre	Bangkok	2,000
November 8, 2007	CentralWorld Live	Bangkok	3,500
Unknown	Thunder Dome	Bangkok	3,900
Unknown	IdeaLive	Bangkok	4,234
October 25, 2024	One Bangkok Forum	Bangkok	6,000
February 11, 2024	UOB Live	Bangkok	6,000
2012	Chanchai Acadium	Bangkok	6,000
October 21, 2024	Paragon Hall	Bangkok	6,520
1966	Indoor Stadium Huamark	Bangkok	8,000
1996	IMPACT Exhibition and Convention Center	Bangkok	9,464
1998	Impact Arena	Bangkok	12,000
2015	Bangkok Arena	Bangkok	12,000
2028	Bangkok Arena (Bangkok Mall)	Bangkok	18,000
February 10, 1938	Suphachalasai Stadium	Bangkok	35,000
1997	Bangkok International Trade & Exhibition Center	Bangkok	43,300 (Event Hall)
1998	Rajamangala Stadium	Bangkok	71,552
July 5, 2005	Chiang Mai International Exhibition & Convention Center	Chiang Mai	10,000
August 10, 2000	MCC Hall at The Mall Nakhon Ratchasima	Nakhon Ratchasima	4,000
2007	Korat Chatchai Hall	Nakhon Ratchasima	5,000
July 6, 2005	Prince Mahidol Hall	Phutthamonthon	2,006

=== United Arab Emirates ===
Opened	Venue	City	Capacity
Abu Dhabi
January 2021	Etihad Arena	Abu Dhabi	18,000
October 29, 2009	du Arena	Abu Dhabi	40,000
October 2009	Yas Marina Circuit	Abu Dhabi	41,093
Dubai
January 21, 2023	Atlantis The Royal	Dubai	1,500
August 31, 2016	Dubai Opera	Dubai	2,000
September 24, 2008	Atlantis The Palm	Dubai	2,500
2022	The Agenda	Dubai	5,000
June 6, 2019	Coca-Cola Arena	Dubai	17,000
October 20, 2020	Dubai Exhibition Centre	Dubai	20,000
February 26, 1979	Dubai World Trade Centre	Dubai	21,472
March 25, 2016	117Live Arena	Dubai	25,000
February 26, 2004	Dubai Media City Amphitheatre	Dubai	25,000
November 28, 2008	The Sevens Stadium	Dubai	50,000
March 27, 2010	Meydan Racecourse	Dubai	60,000
Sharjah
December 14, 2020	Khor Fakkan Amphitheatre	Khor Fakkan	3,600

=== Vietnam ===
Opened	Venue	City	Capacity
2017	Ariyana Convention Center	Da Nang	2,500
December 25, 2010	Tiên Sơn Sports Arena	Da Nang	7,200
August 30, 2016	Hòa Xuân Stadium	Da Nang	20,500
September 1, 1985	Cultural Friendship Palace	Hanoi	1,111
September 19, 2009	Hanoi Indoor Games Gymnasium	Hanoi	3,094
October 15, 2006	Vietnam National Convention Center	Hanoi	3,500
September 2, 2003	Mỹ Đình National Stadium	Hanoi	50,000
April 26, 1985	Hòa Bình Theater	Ho Chi Minh City	2,330
July 2002	Nguyễn Du Gymnasium	Ho Chi Minh City	3,000
September 1997	Lan Anh Music Center	Ho Chi Minh City	3,170
November 20, 2003	Phú Thọ Indoor Stadium	Ho Chi Minh City	7,000
Unknown	Quân khu 7 Stadium	Ho Chi Minh City	18,000
June 30, 2008	Crown Convention Center	Nha Trang	7,500

== Defunct ==
Years active	Venue	City	Capacity
Hong Kong
1995-2024	Star Hall at KITEC	Kowloon	3,600
Japan
2000-2014	Shibuya-AX	Tokyo	1,500
Malaysia
1998-2025	Malawati Stadium	Selangor	13,000
Philippines
1974-2020	Tanghalang Francisco Balagtas	Manila	8,458

== Gallery ==
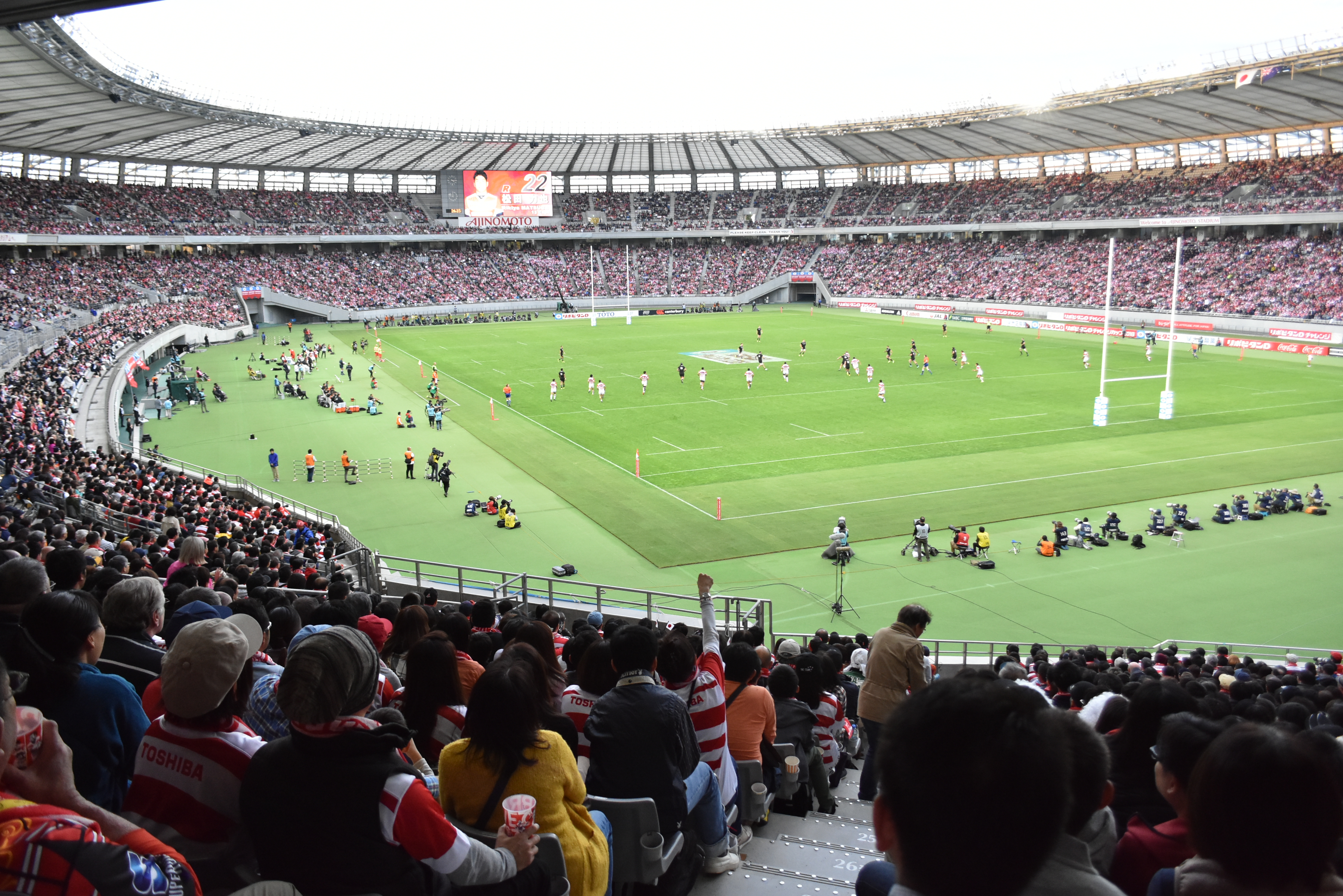
Ajinomoto Stadium

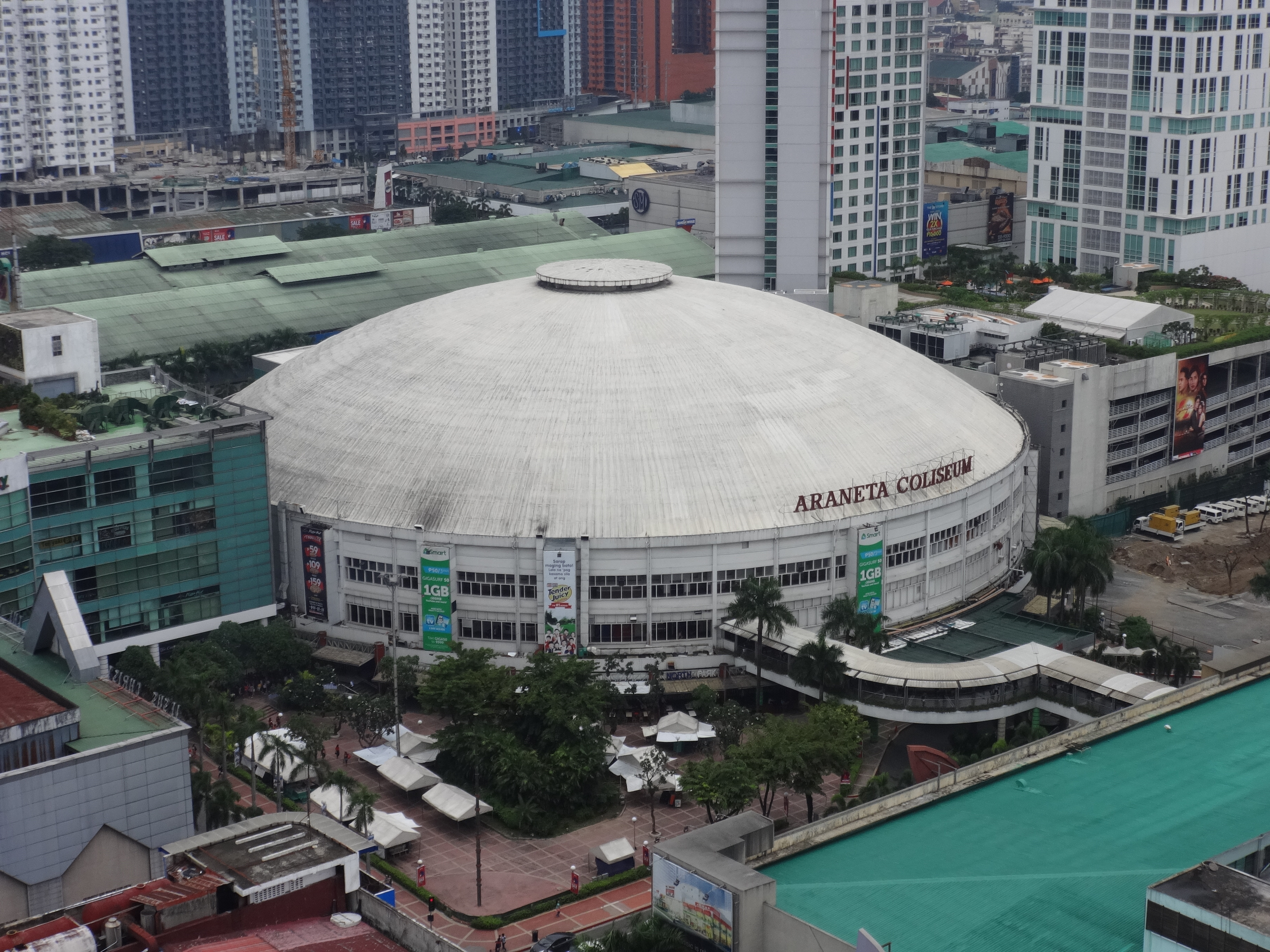
Araneta Coliseum

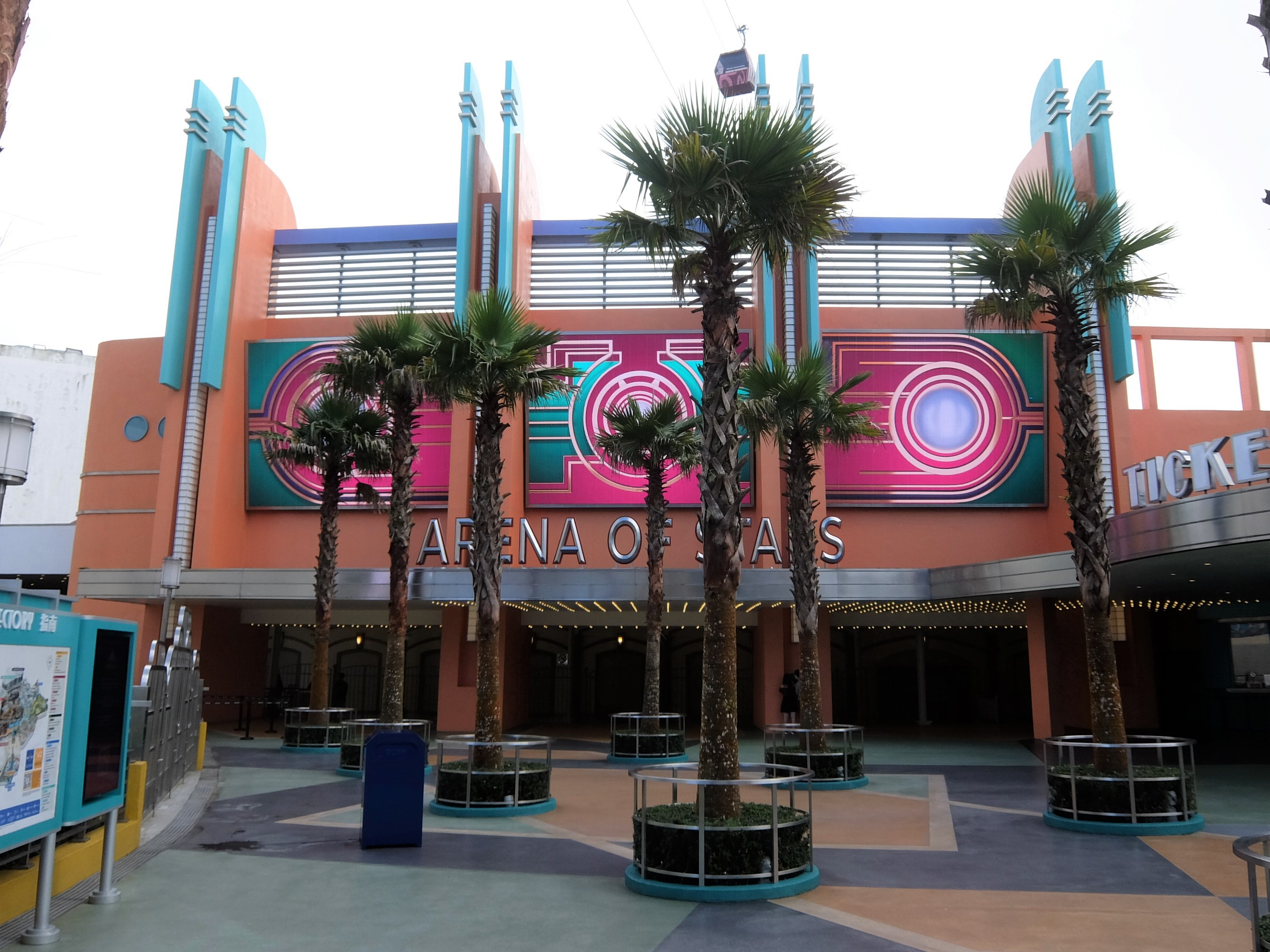
Arena of Stars

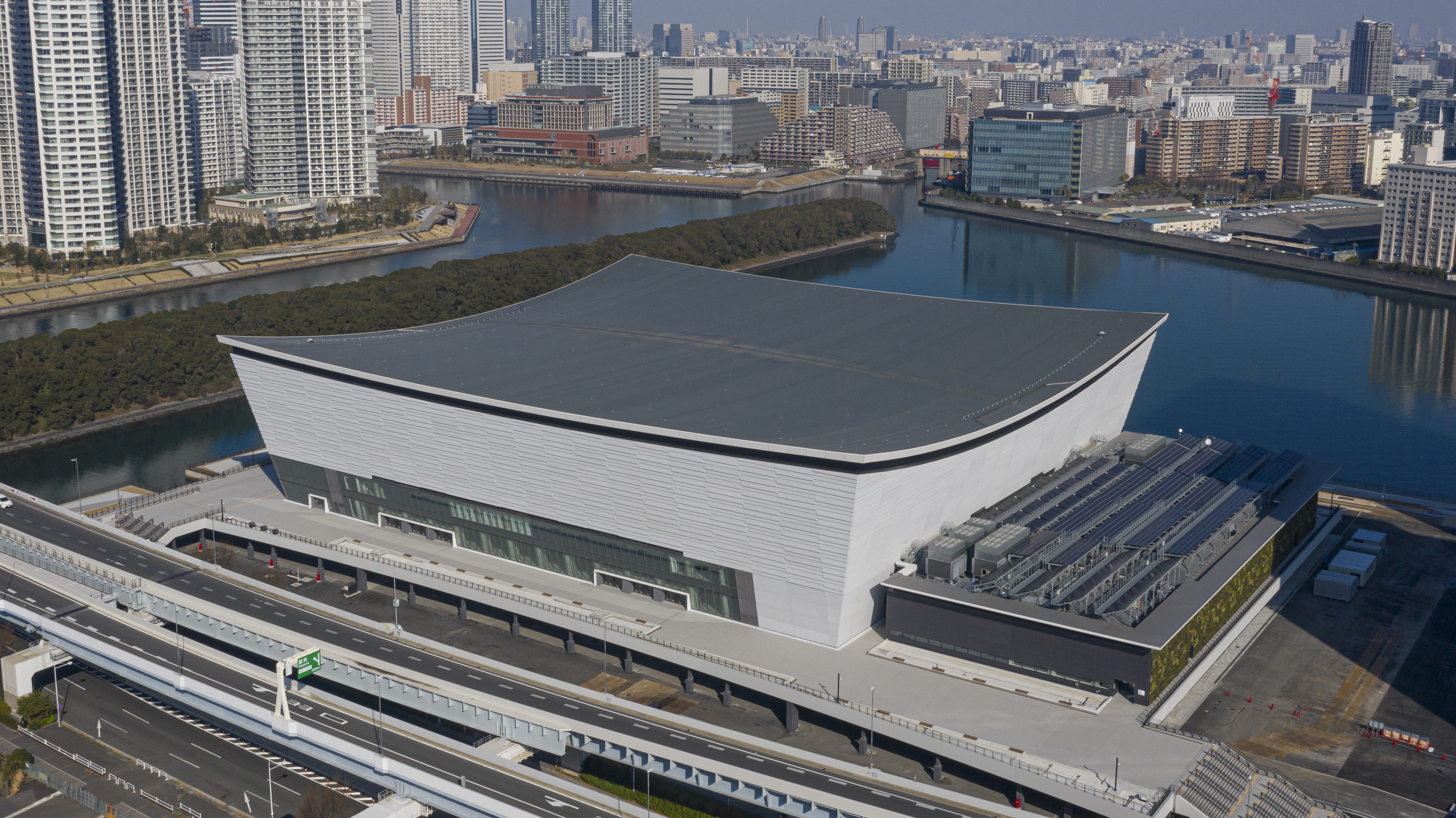
Ariake Arena

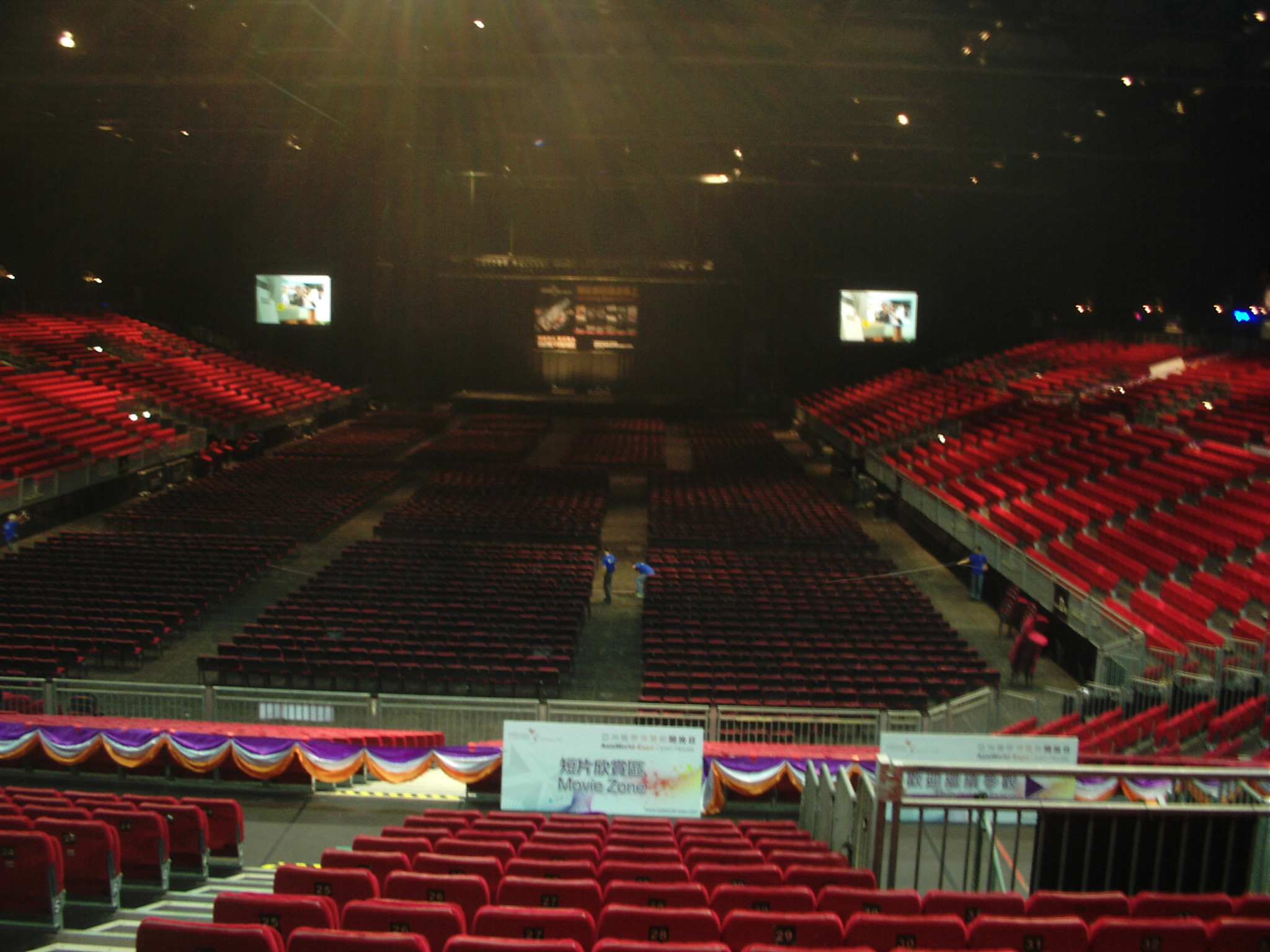
AsiaWorld-Arena

Axiata Arena

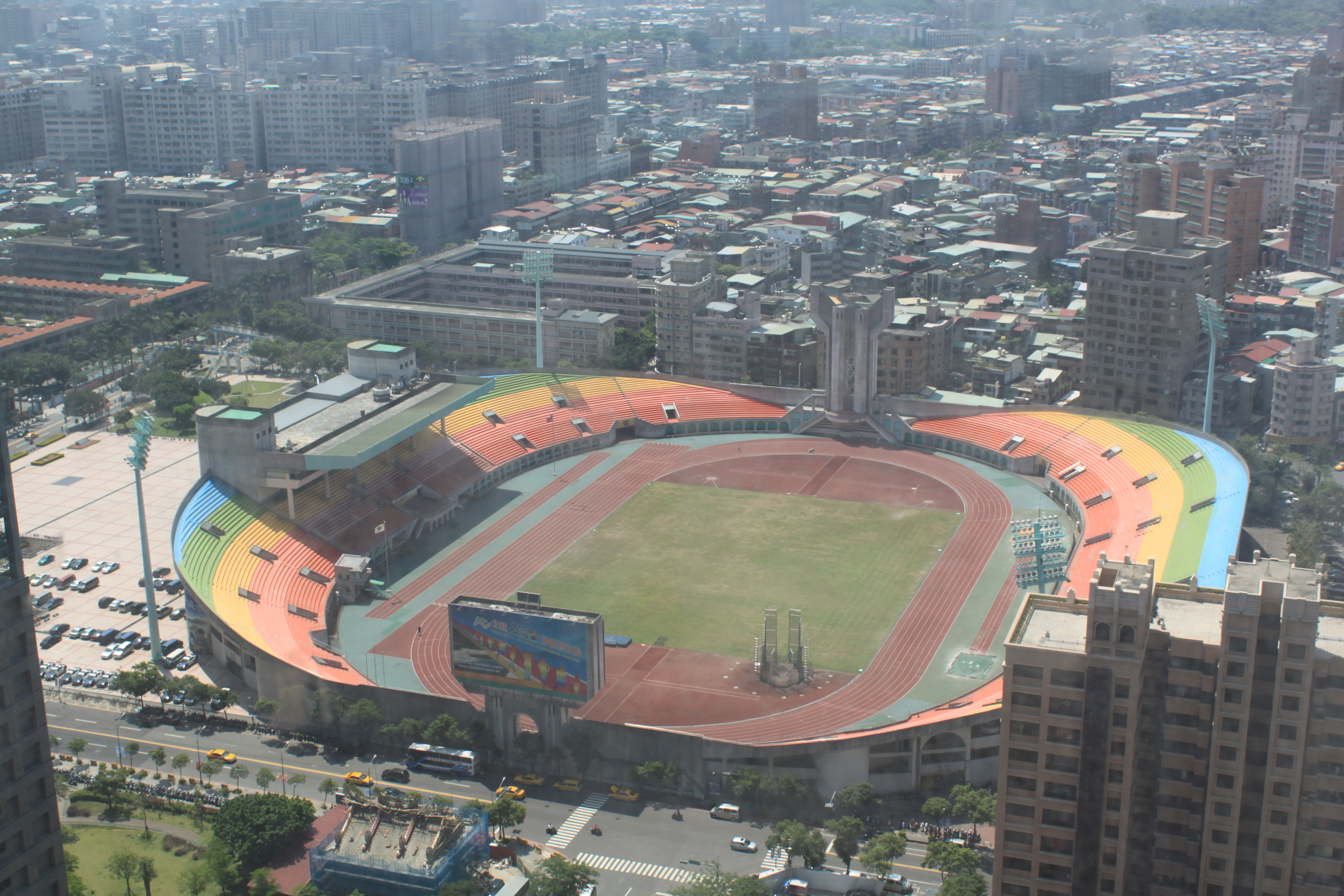
Banqiao Stadium

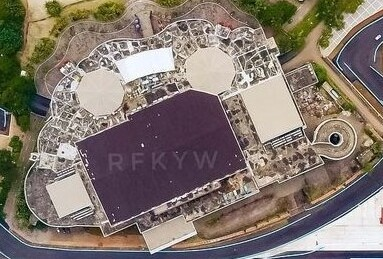
Beach City International Stadium

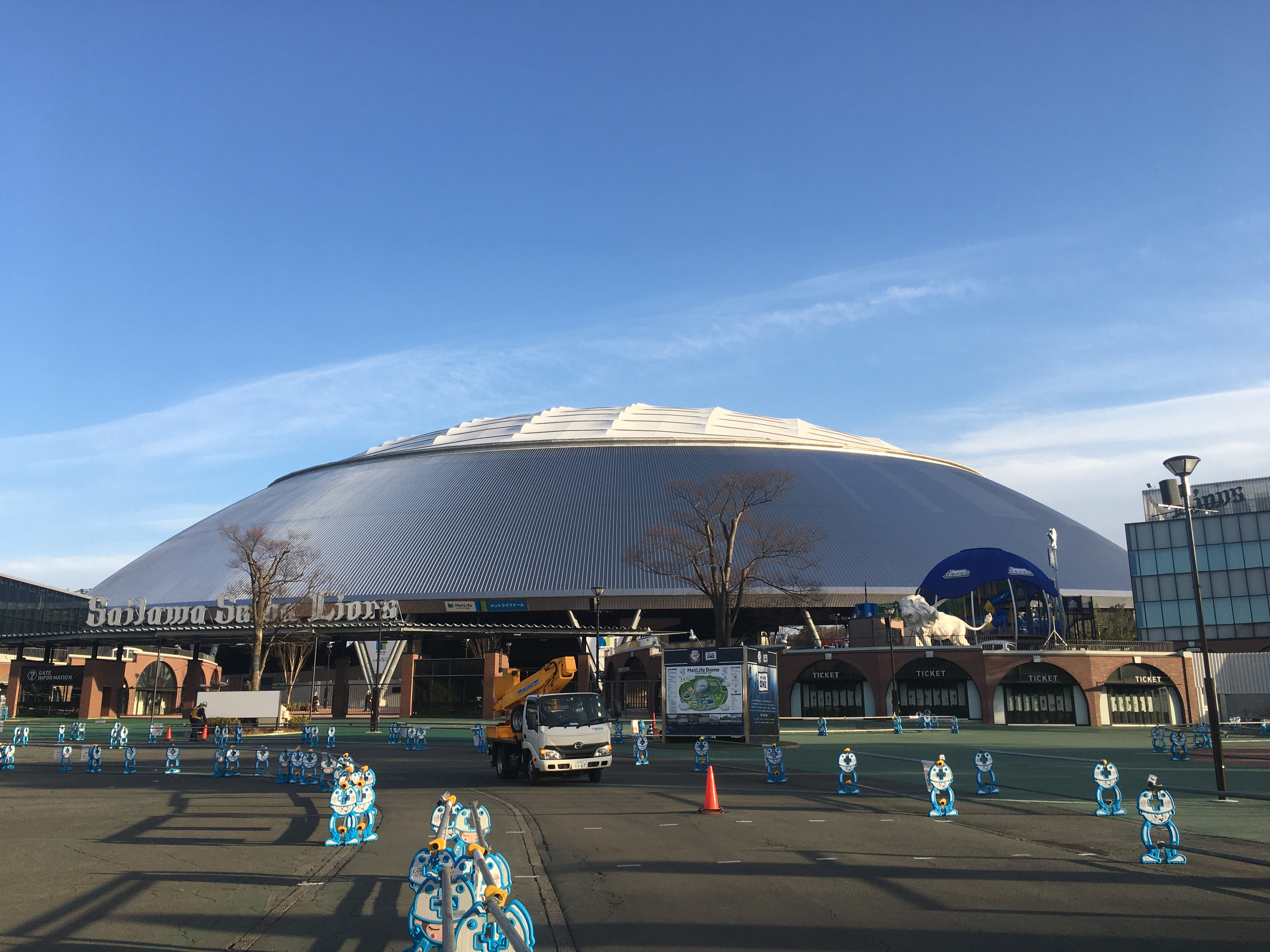
Belluna Dome

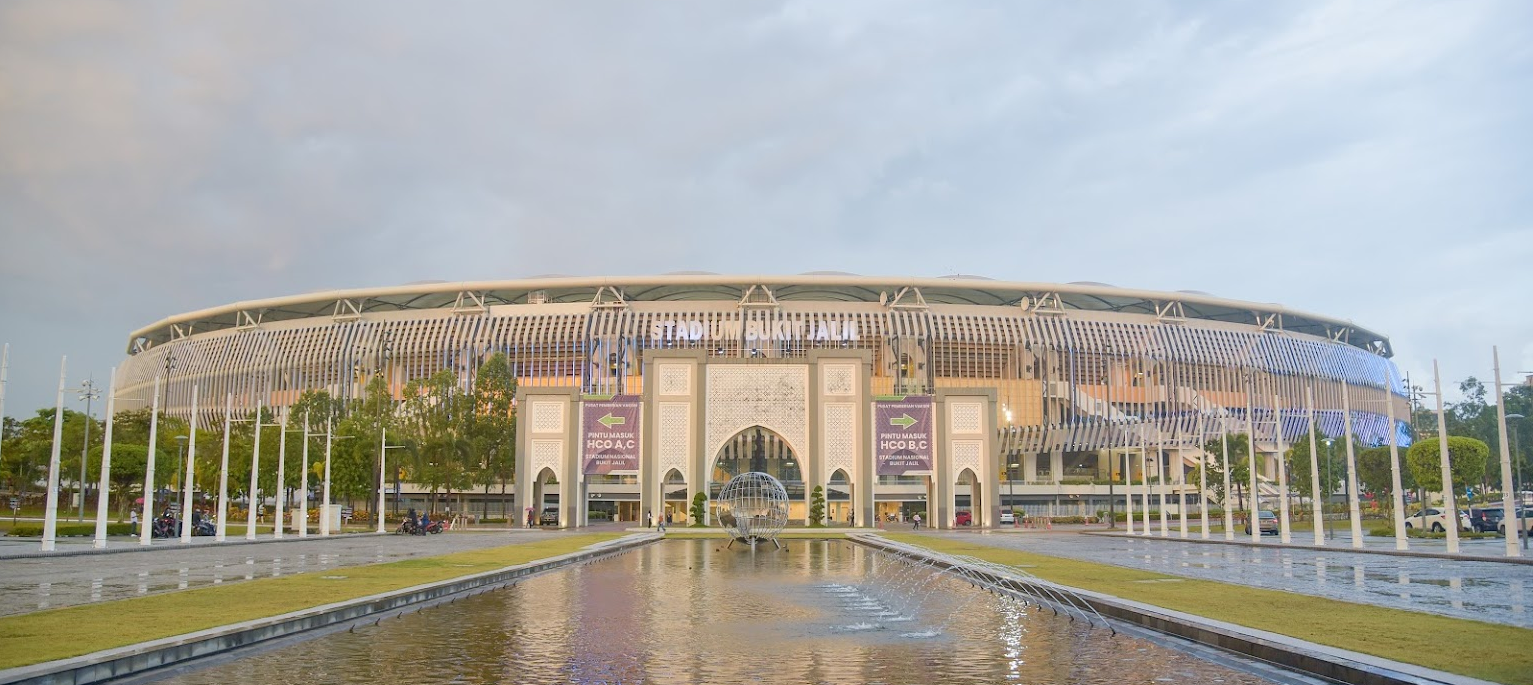
Bukit Jalil National Stadium

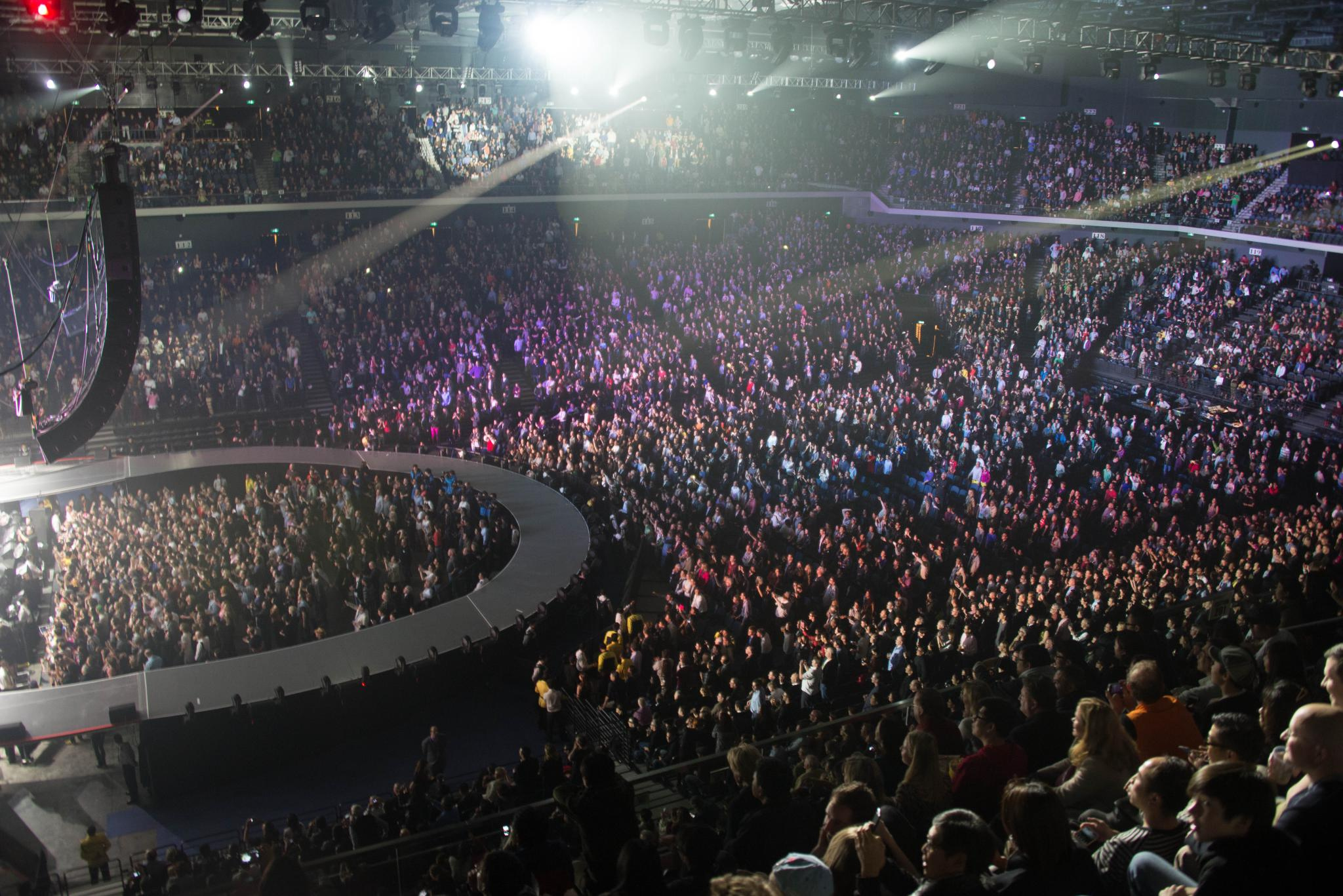
Cotai Arena

Cuneta Astrodome

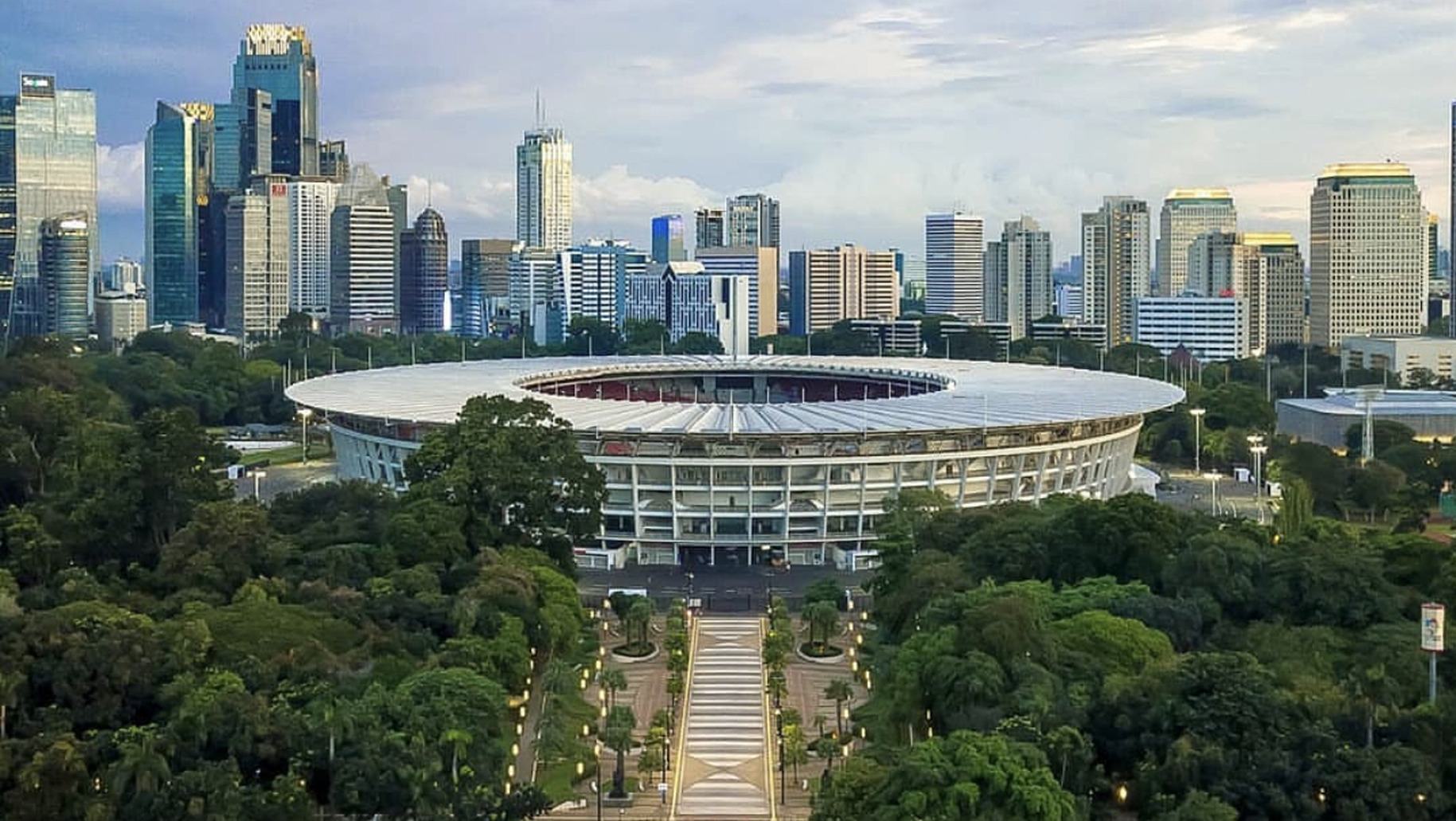
Gelora Bung Karno Stadium

Gocheok Sky Dome

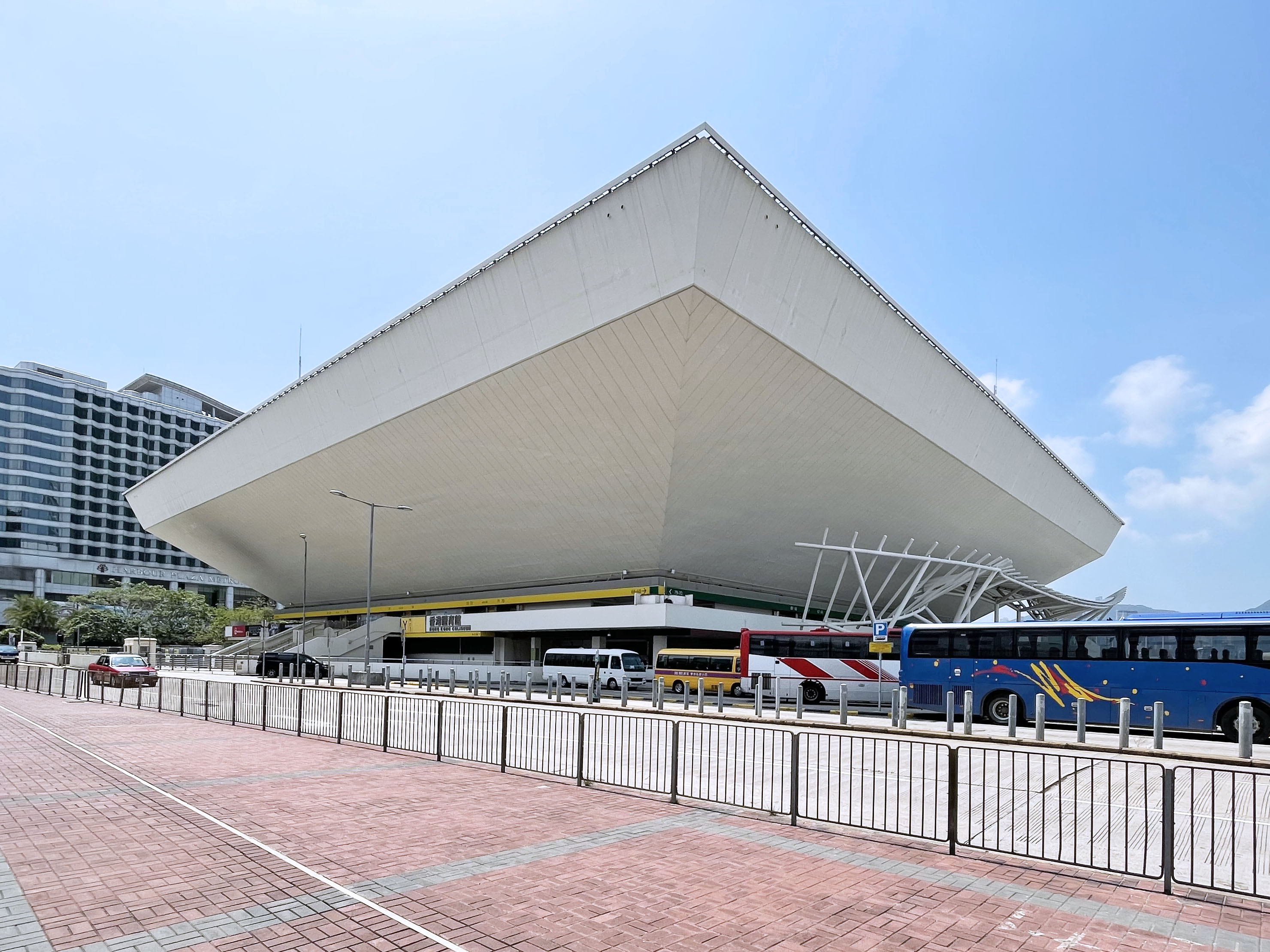
Hong Kong Coliseum

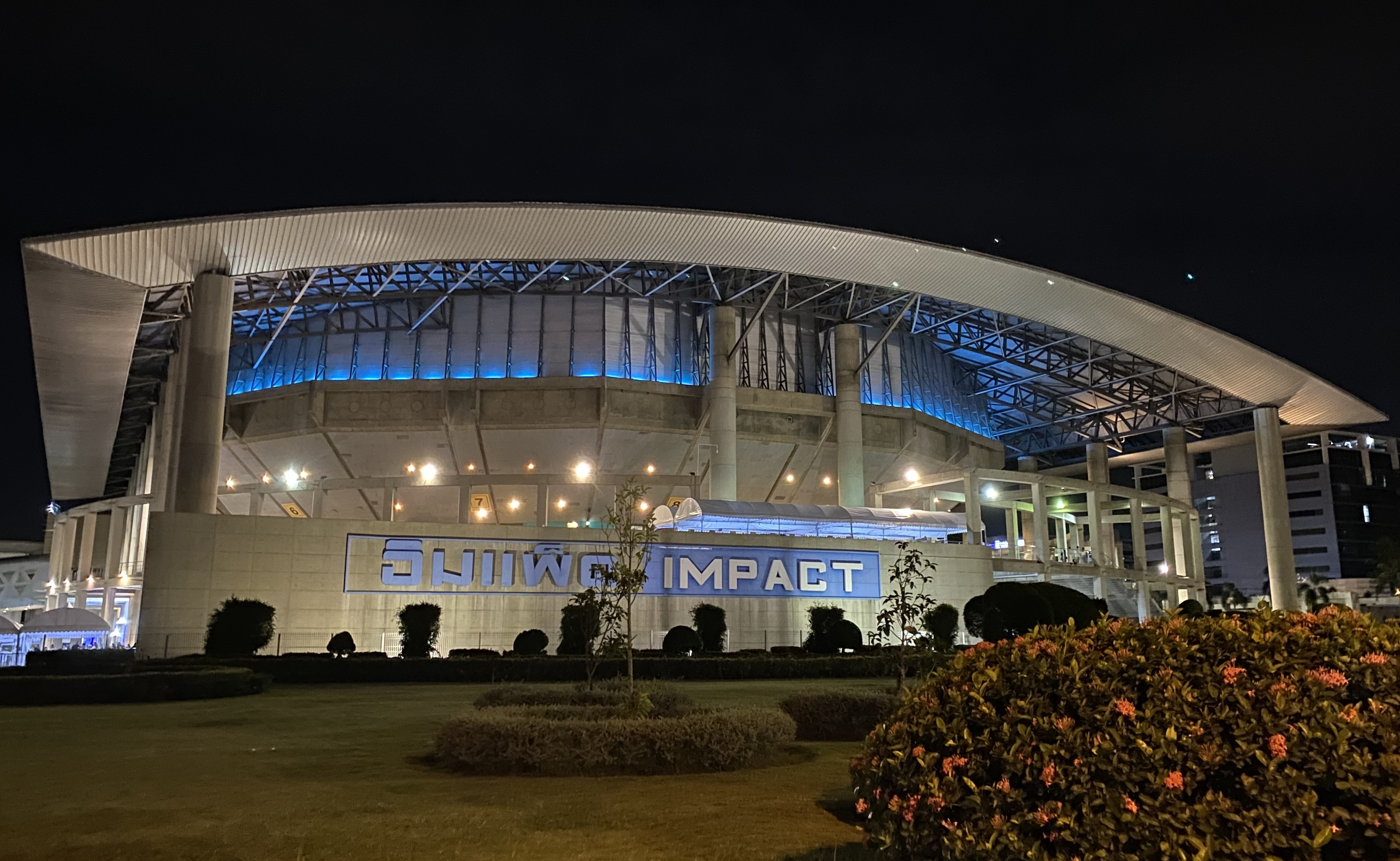
Impact Arena

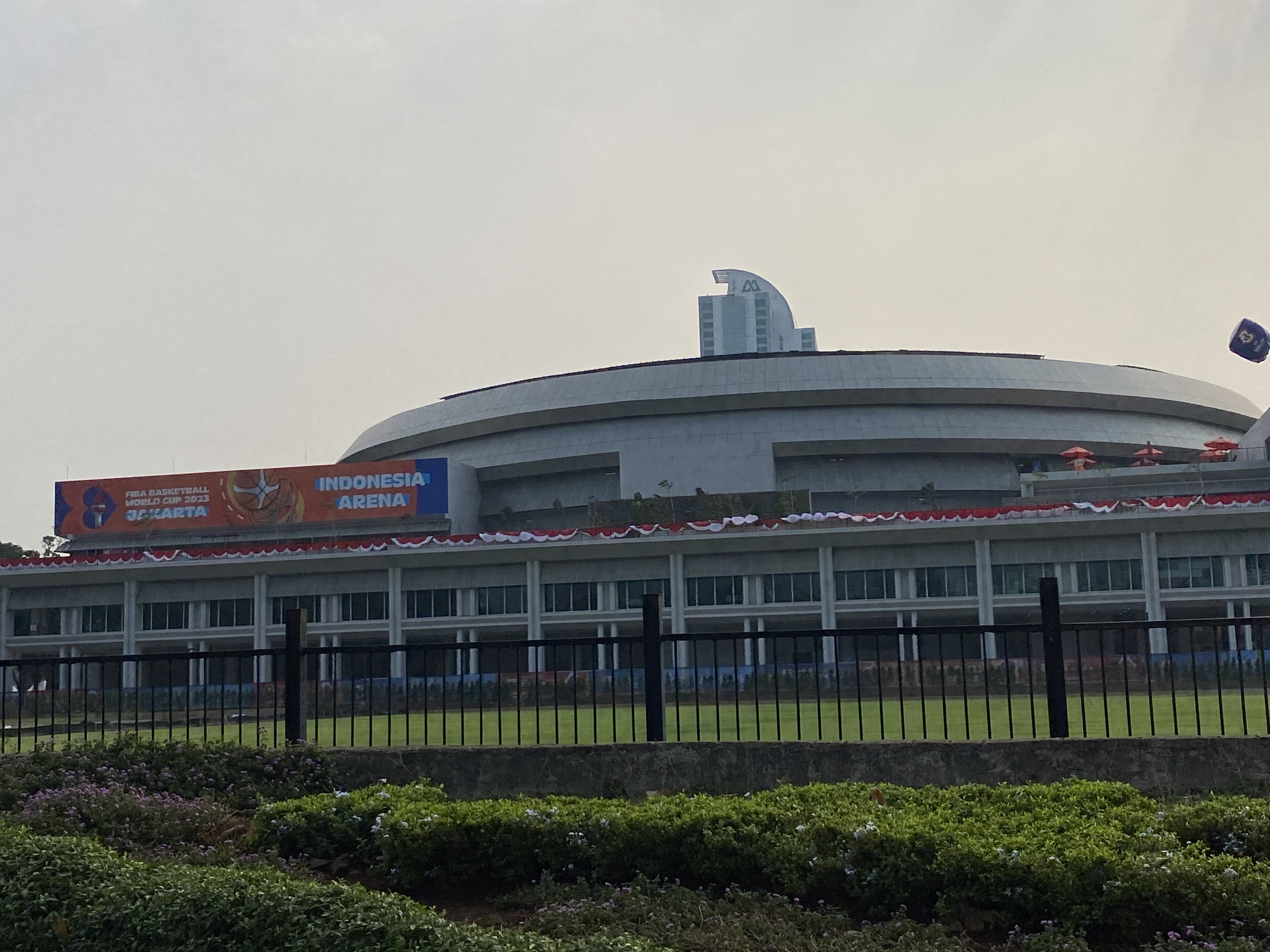
Indonesia Arena

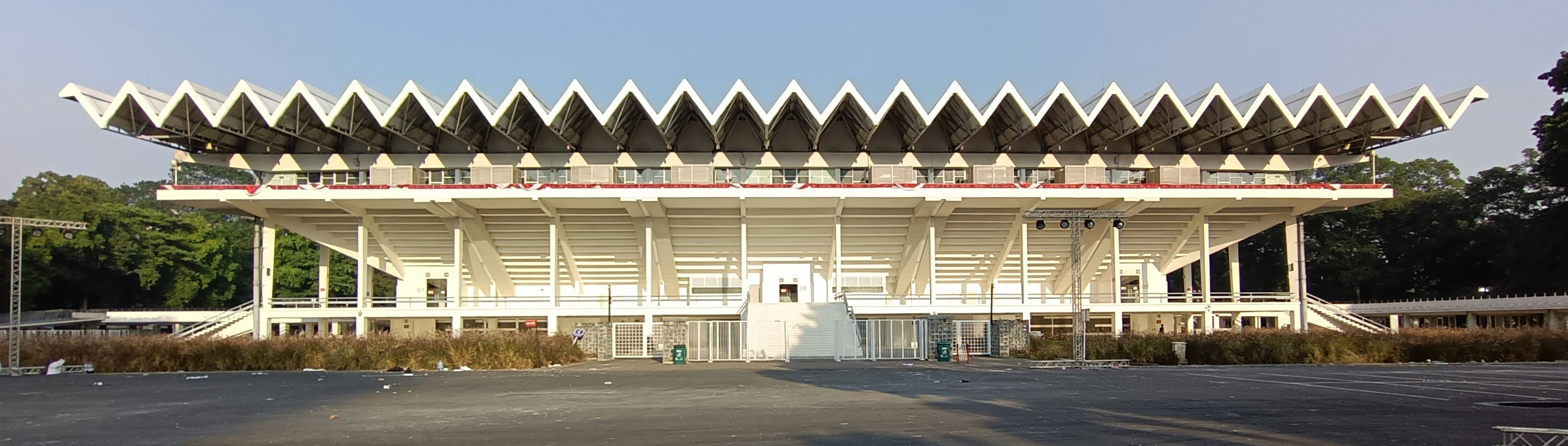
Istora Gelora Bung Karno

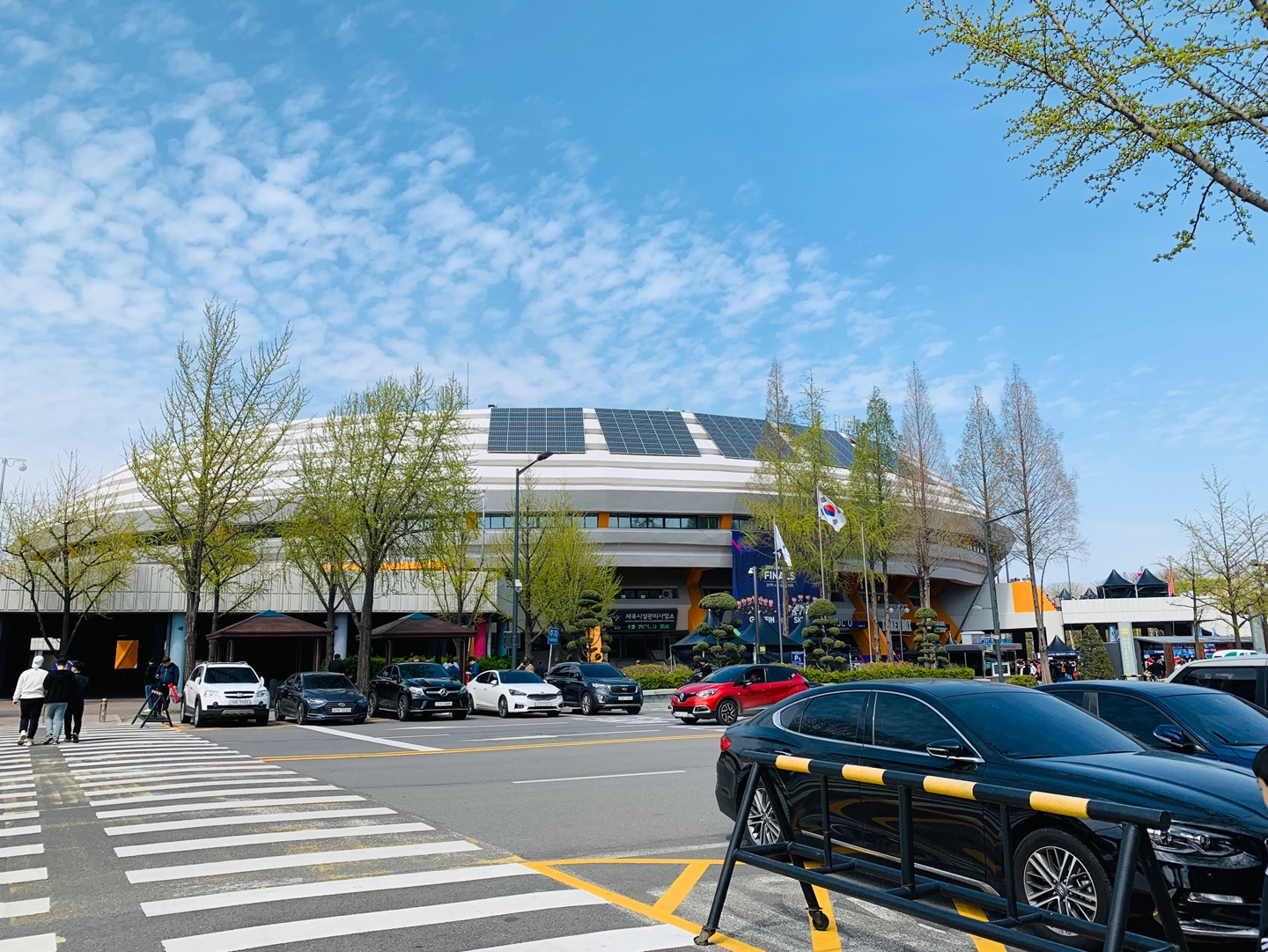
Jamsil Arena

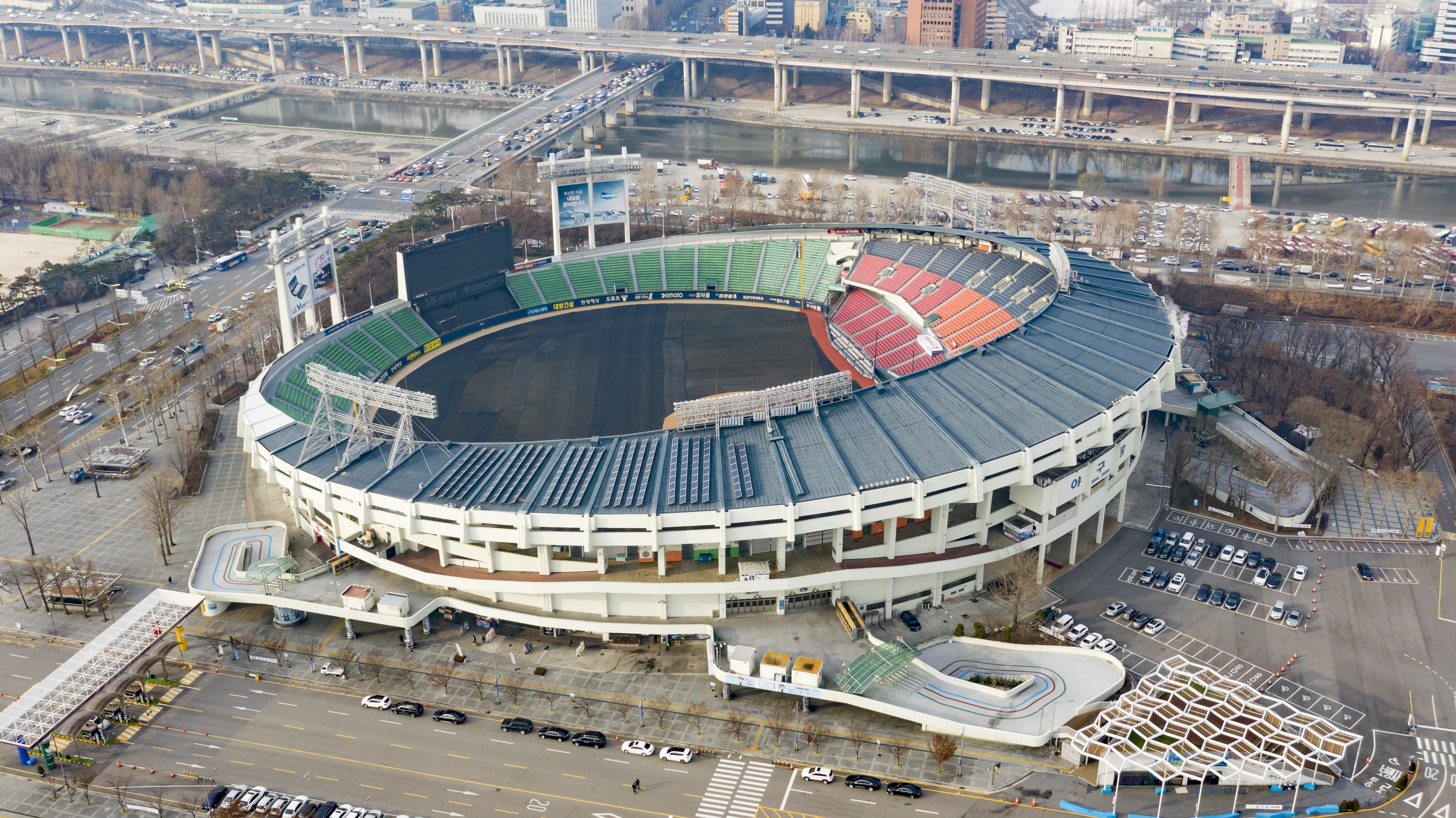
Jamsil Baseball Stadium

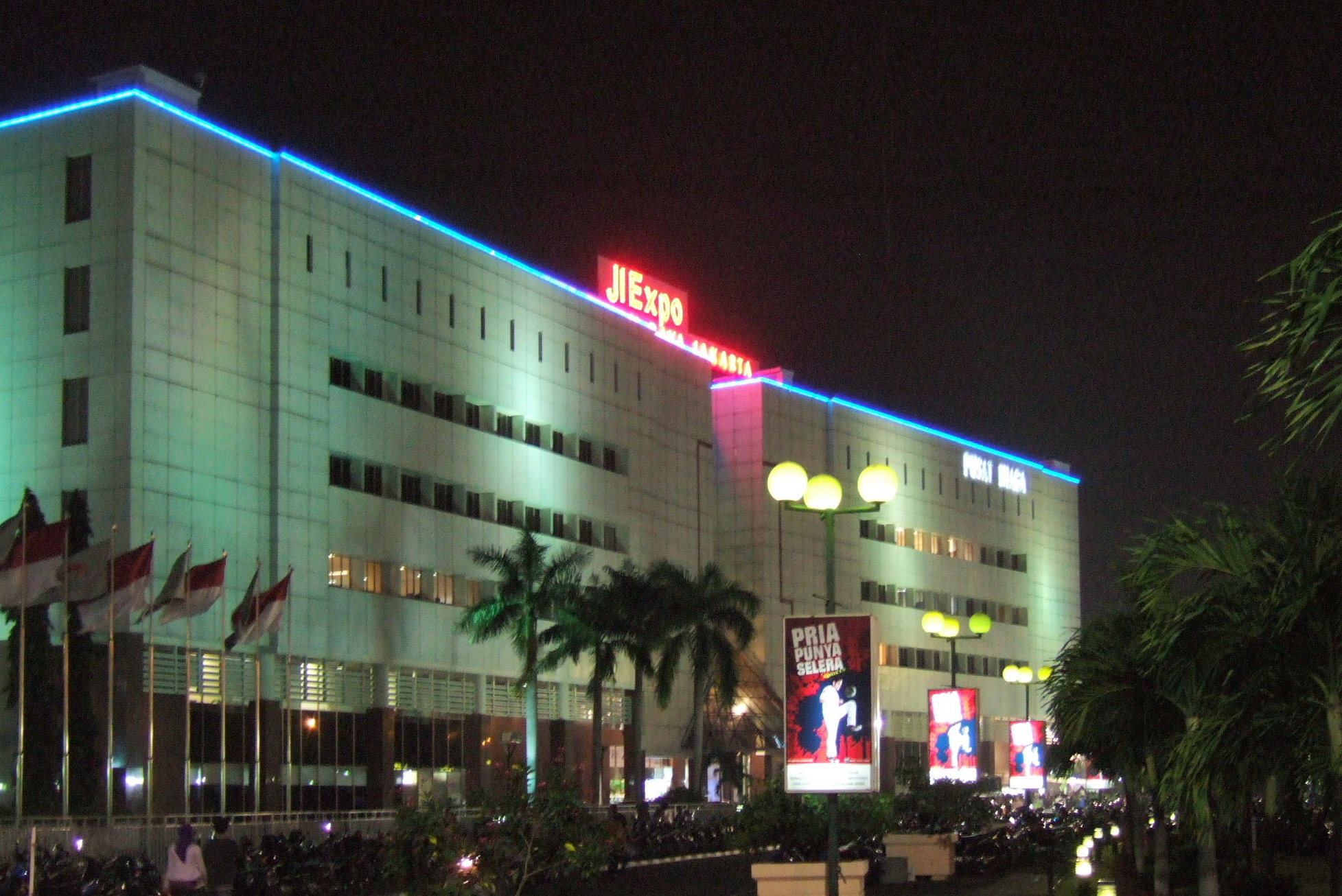
Jakarta International Expo

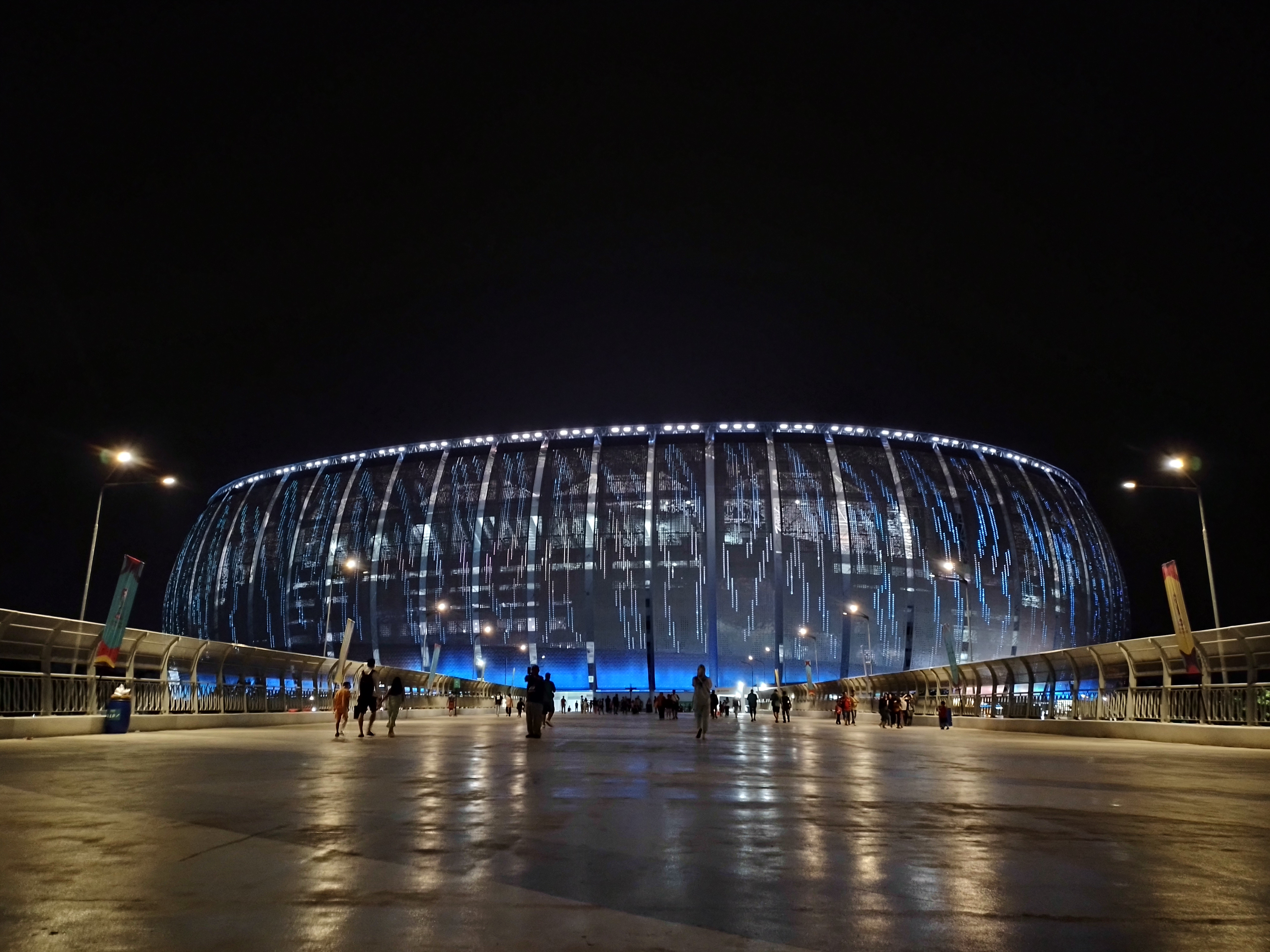
Jakarta International Stadium

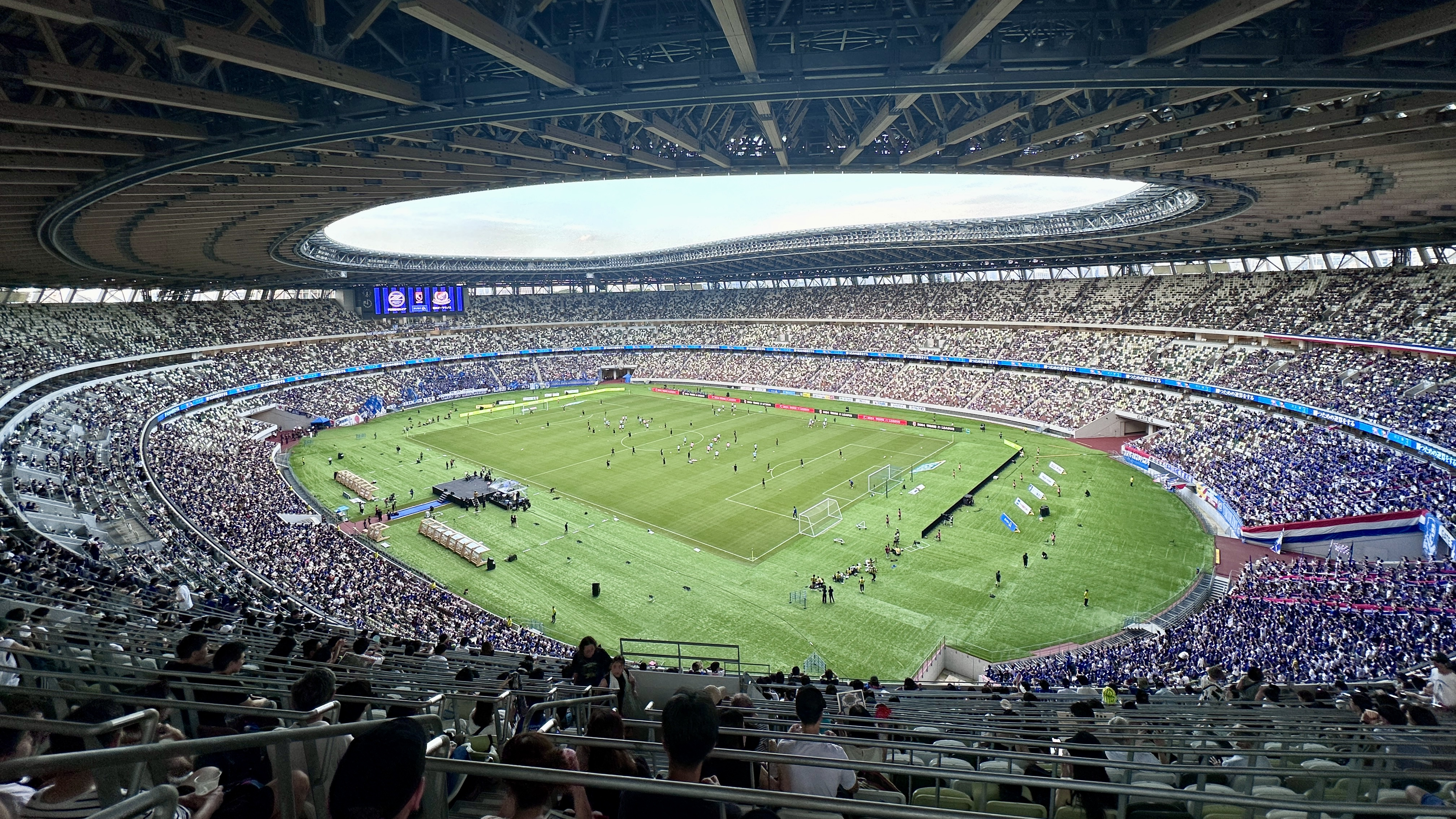
Japan National Stadium

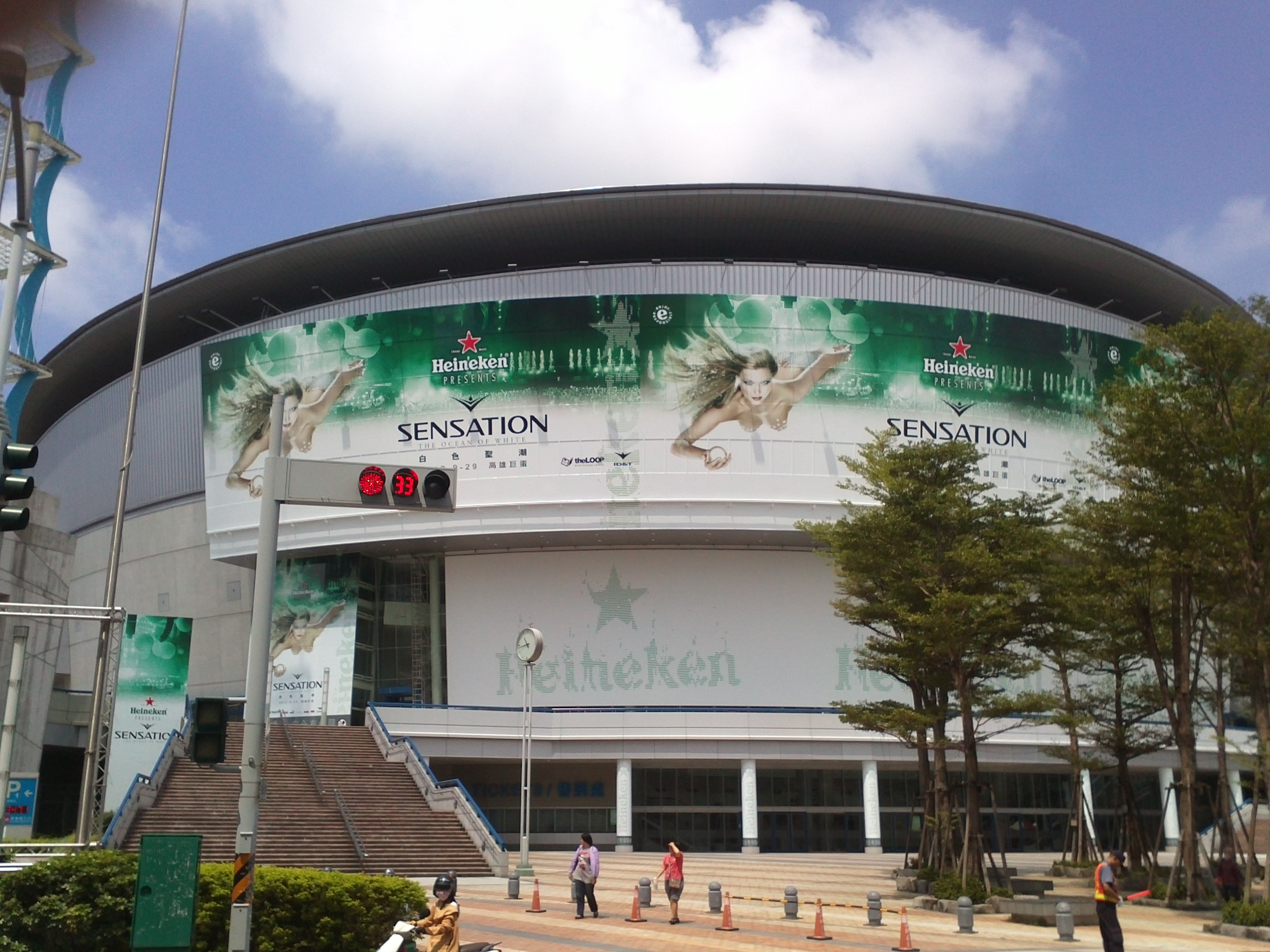
Kaohsiung Arena

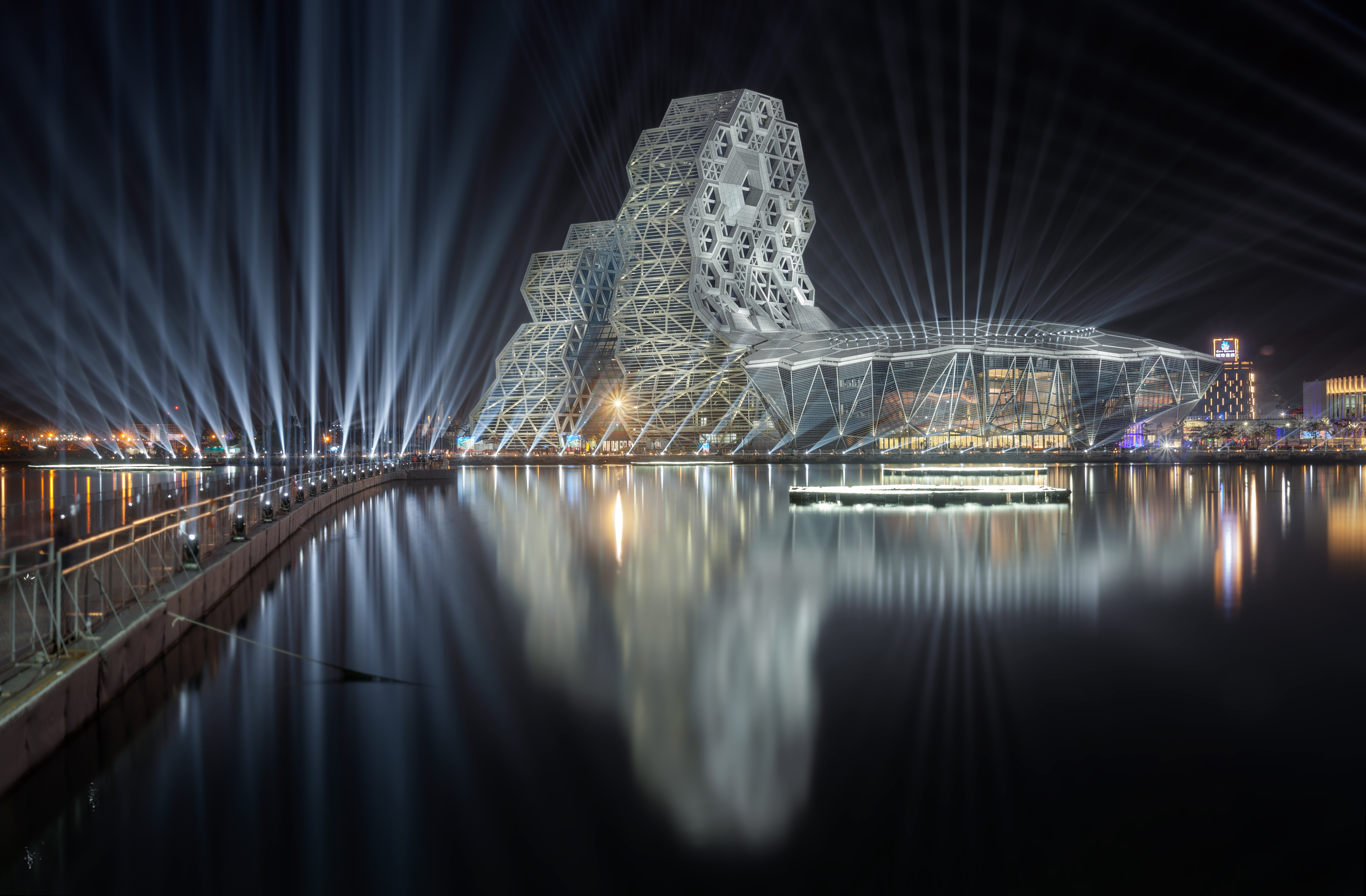
Kaohsiung Music Center

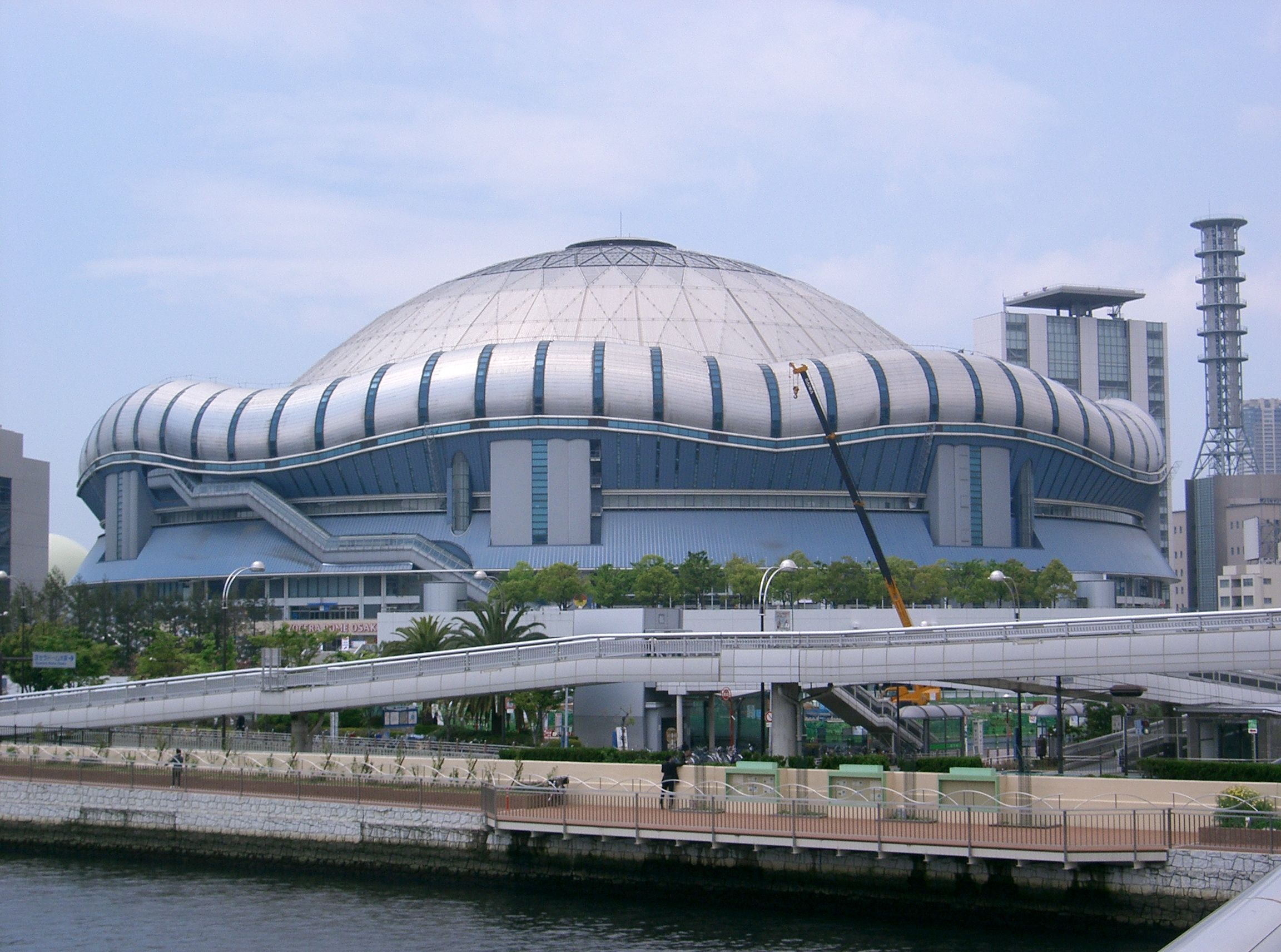
Kyocera Dome Osaka

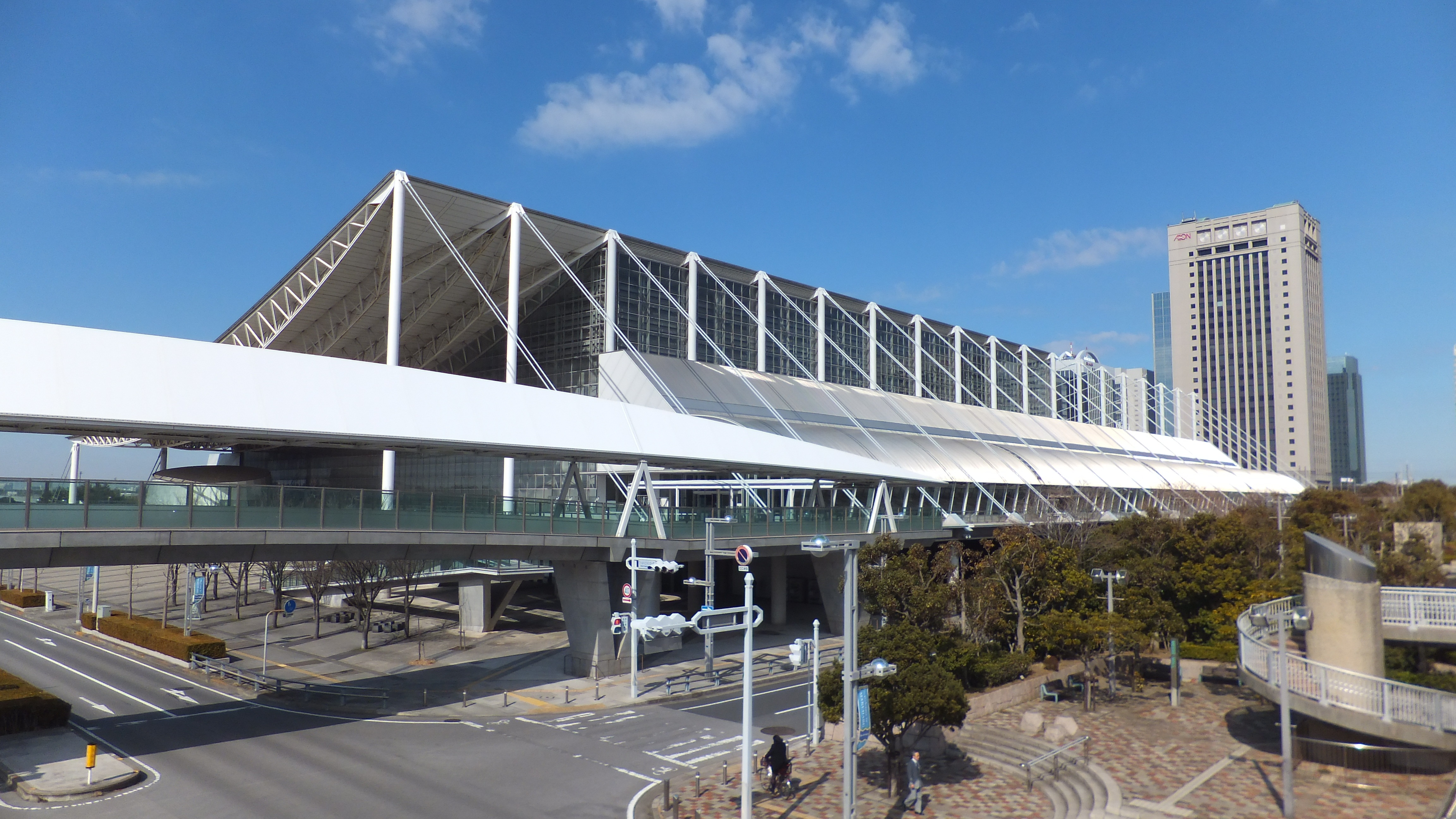
Makuhari Messe

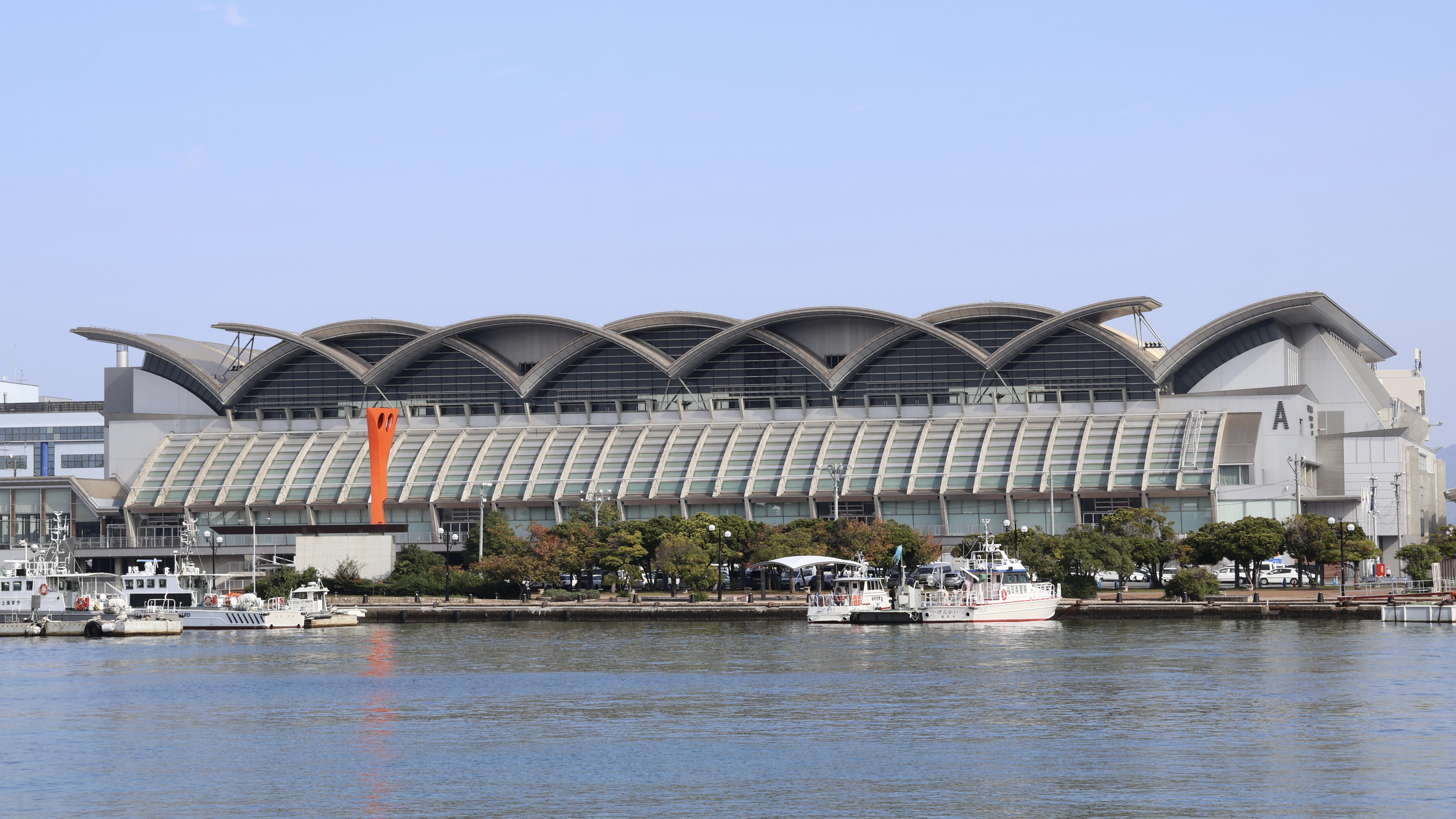
Marine Messe

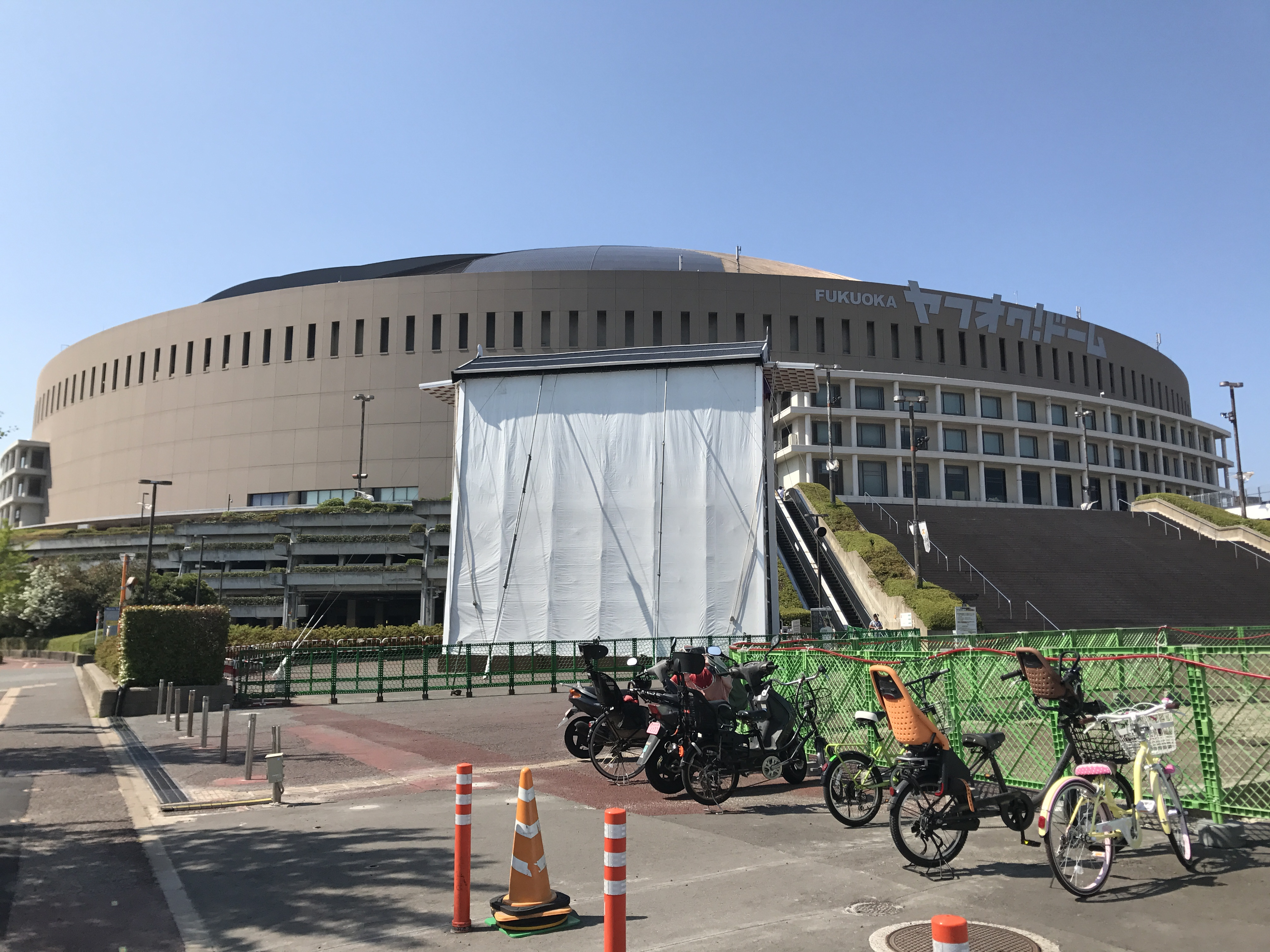
Mizuho PayPay Dome Fukuoka

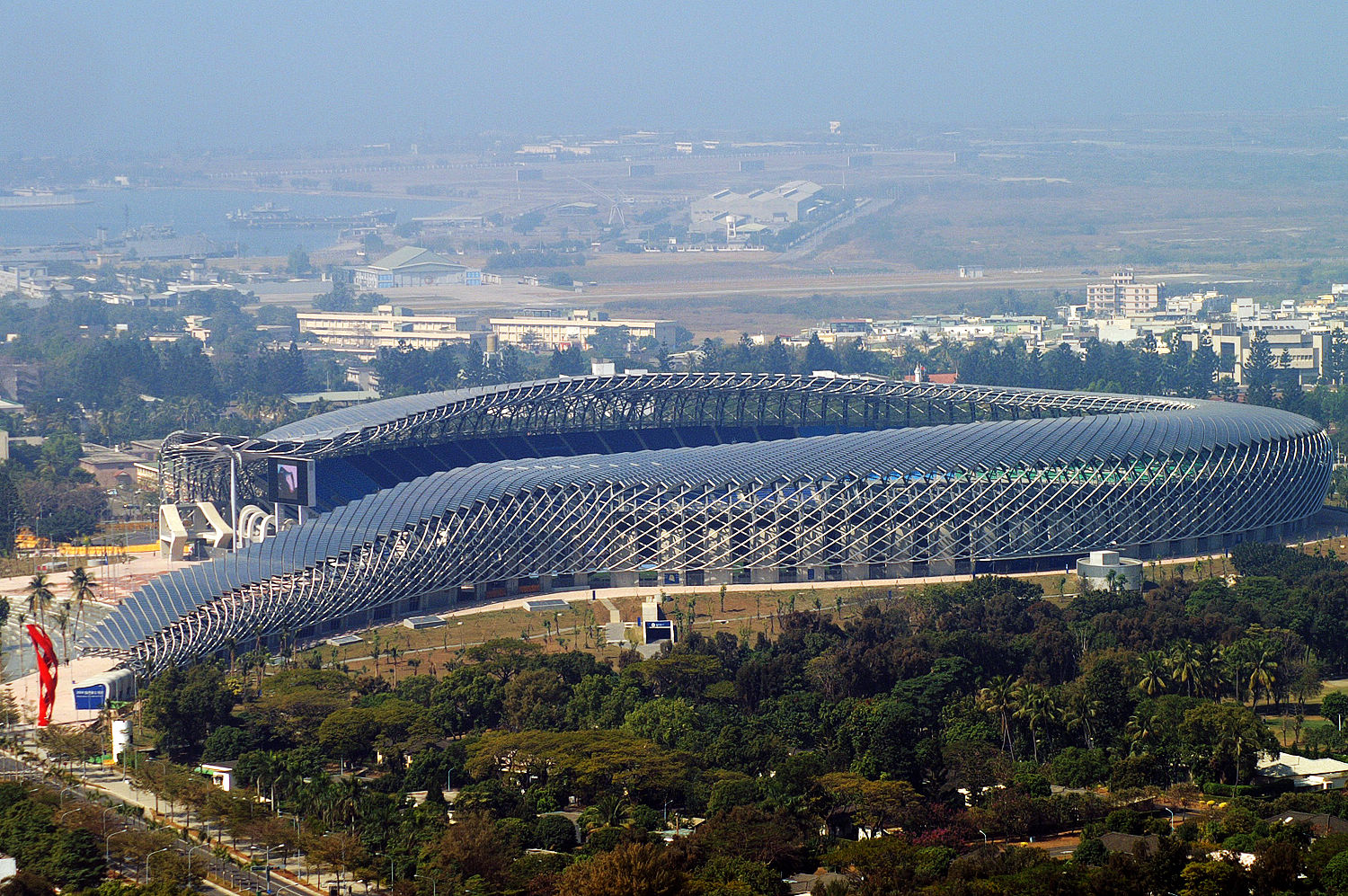
National Stadium

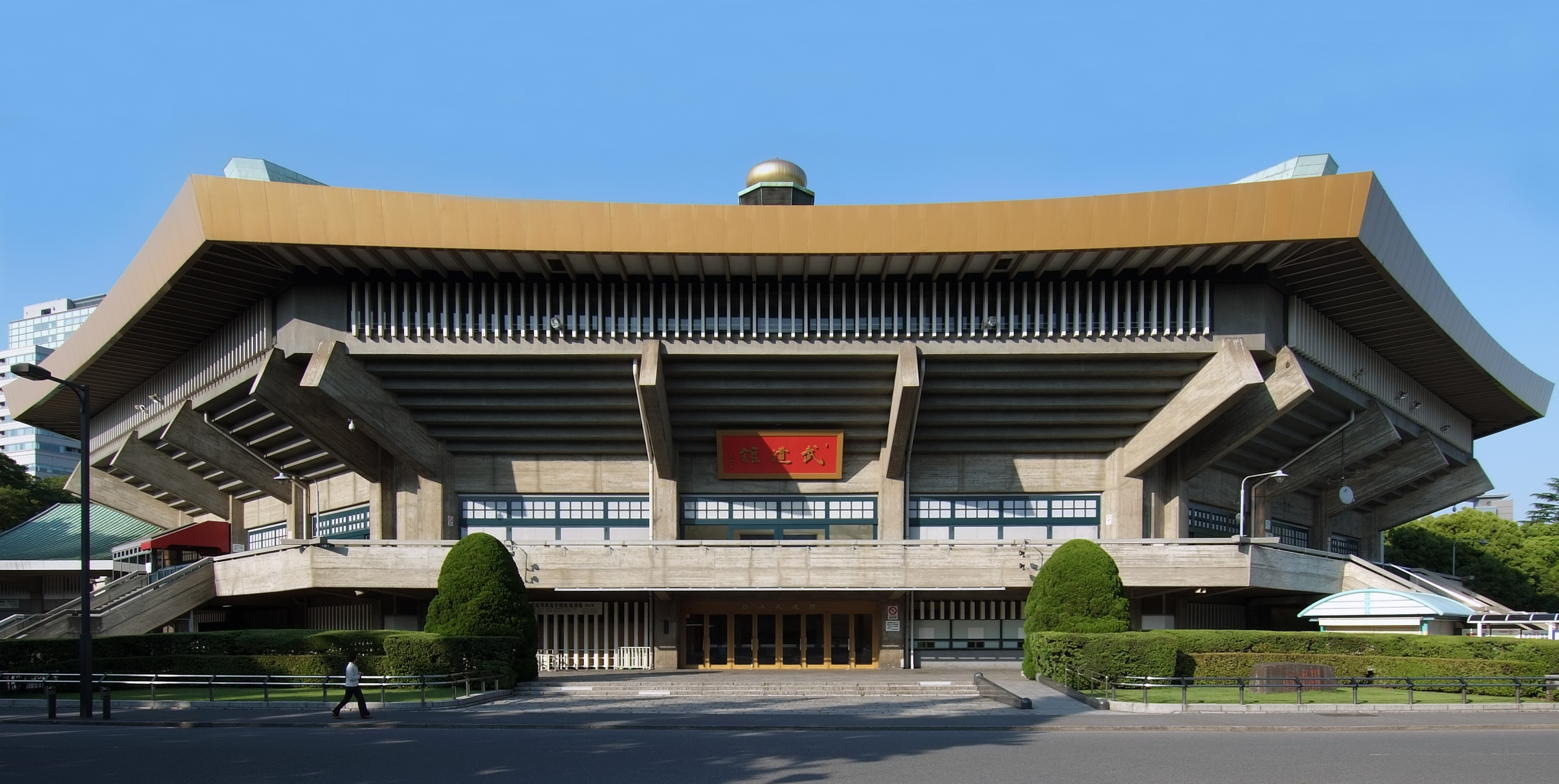
Nippon Budokan

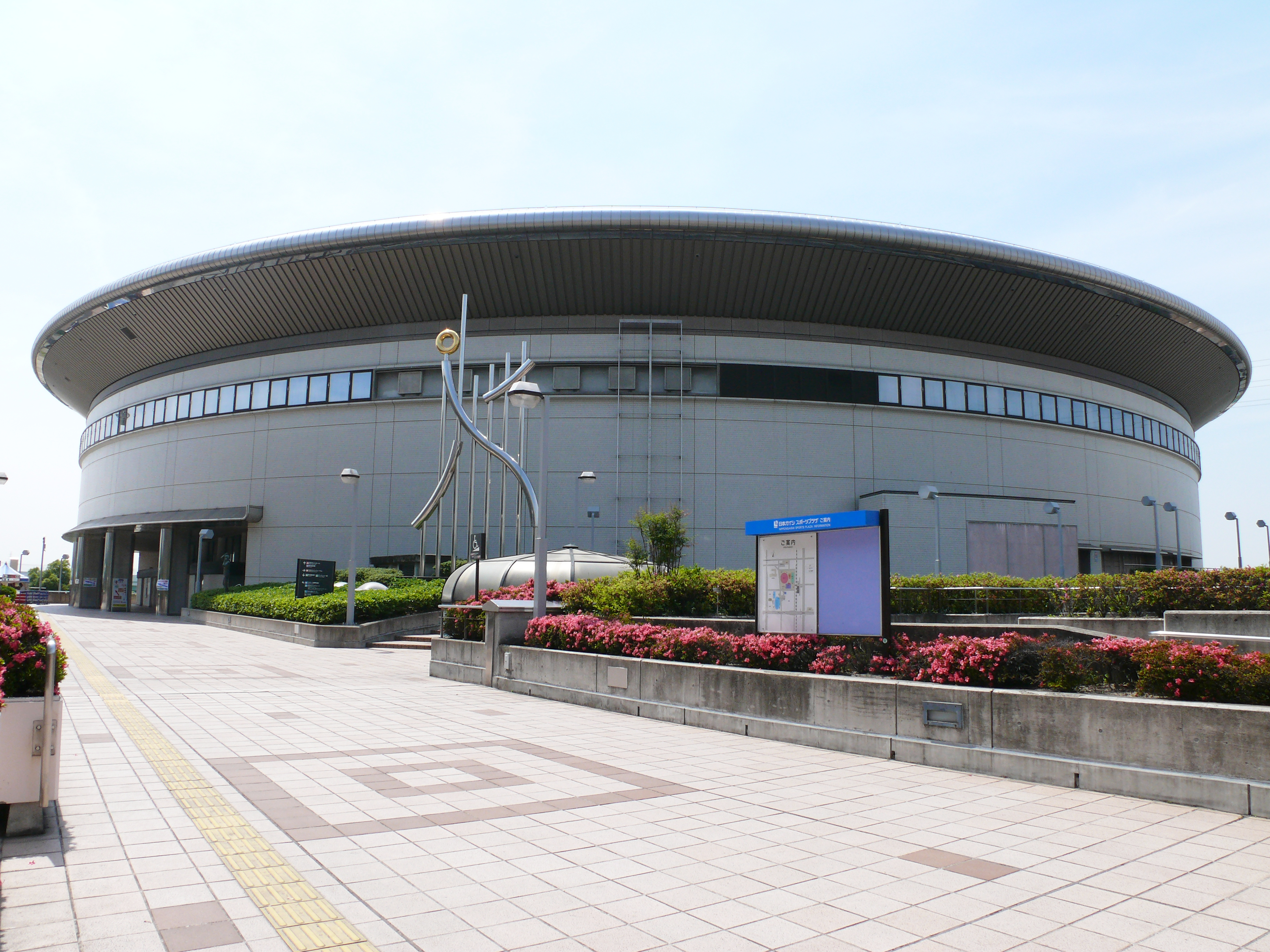
Nippon Gaishi Hall

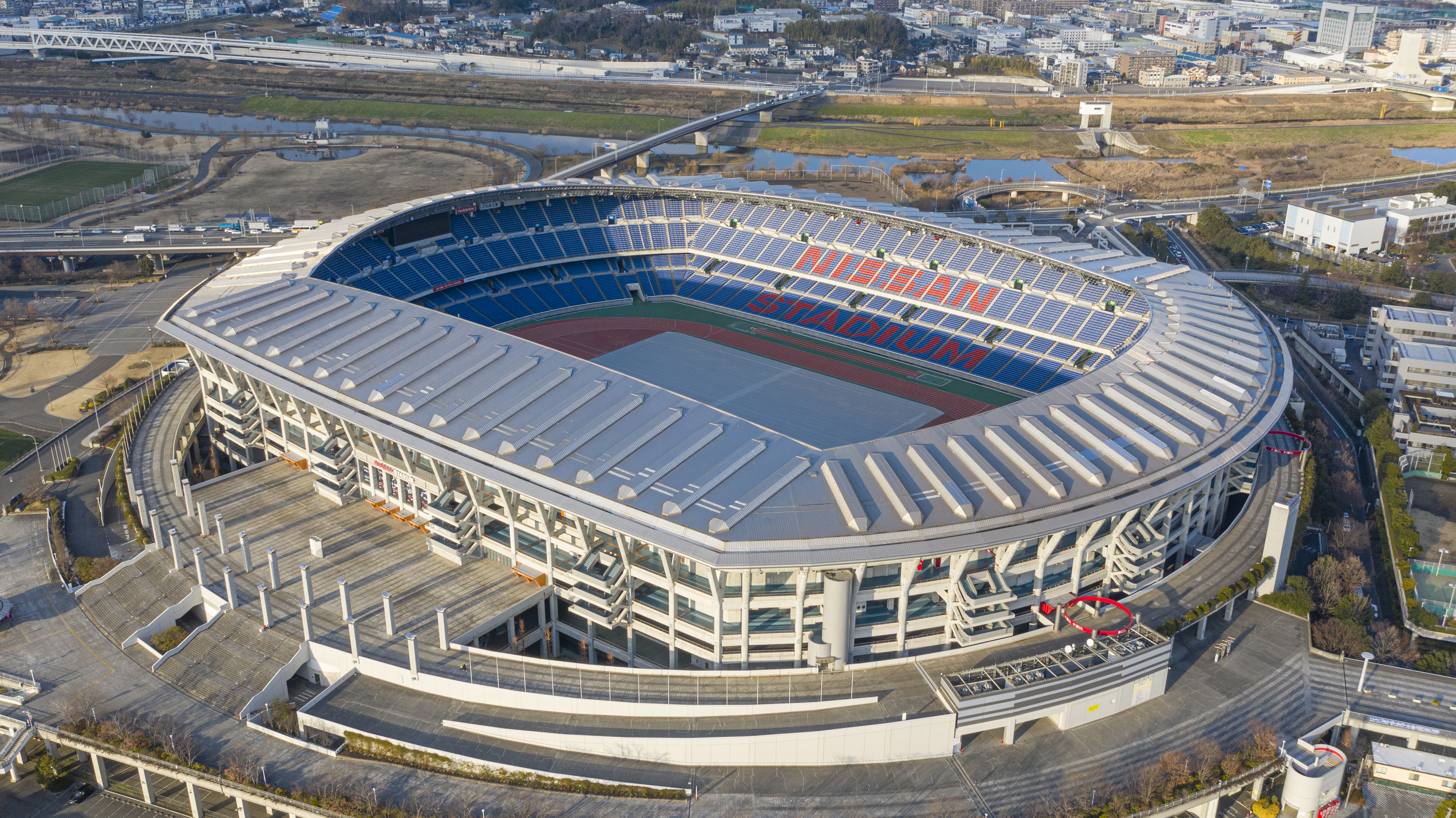
Nissan Stadium

Olympic Gymnastics Arena

Philippine Arena

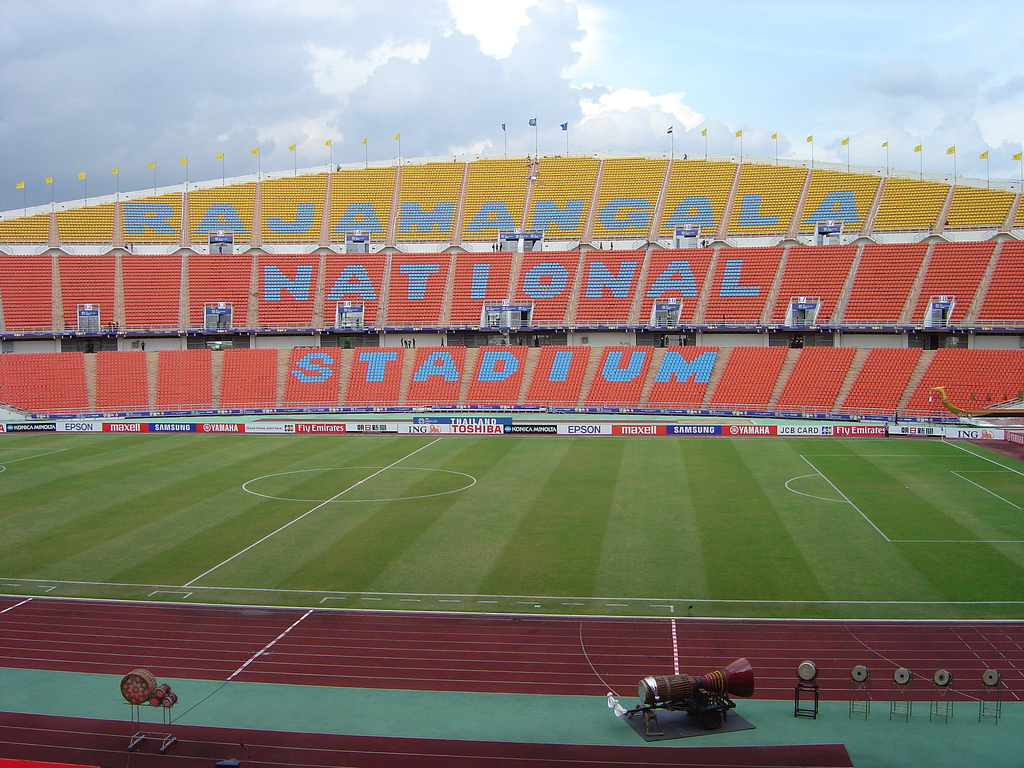
Rajamangala Stadium

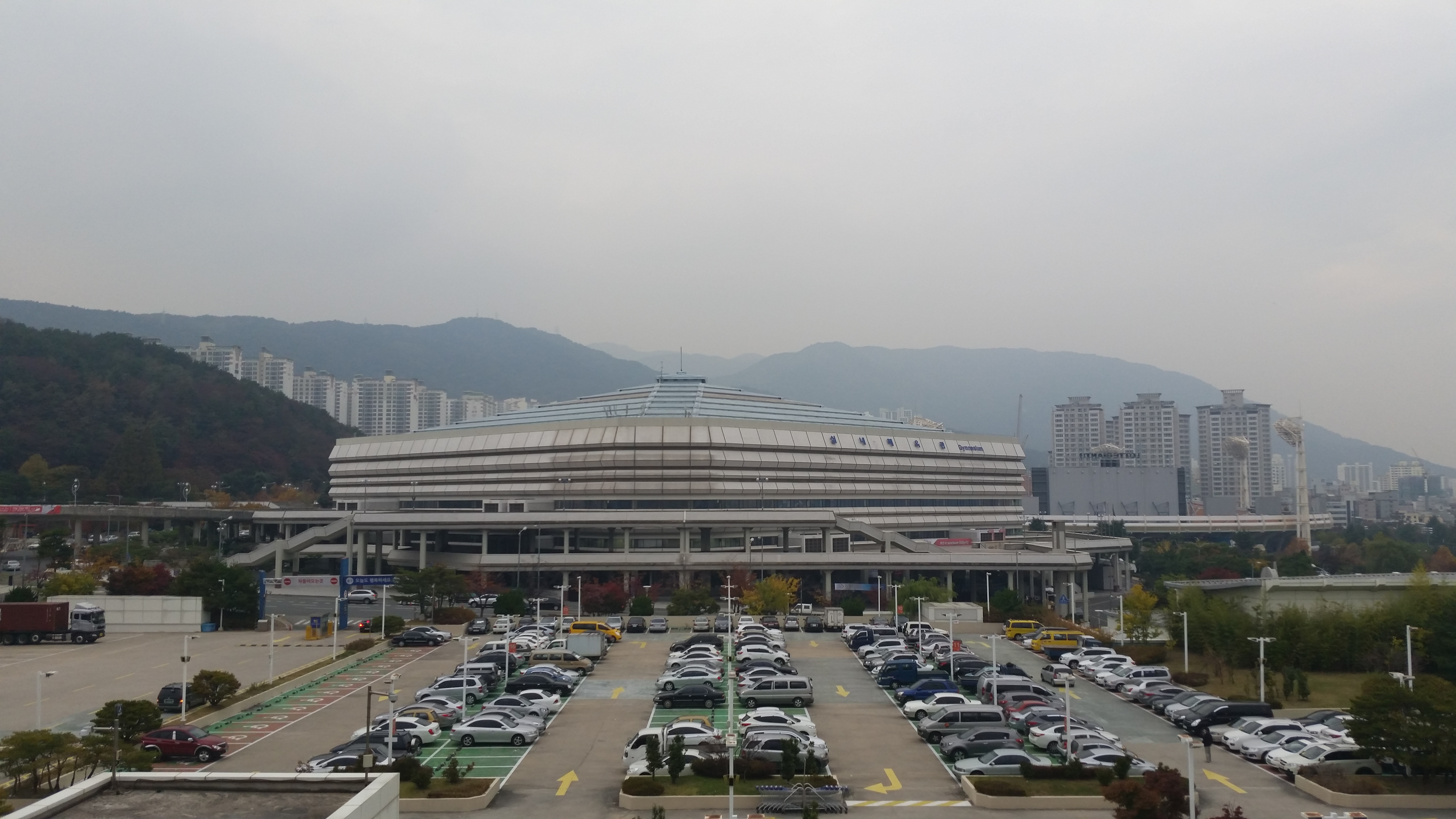
Sajik Arena

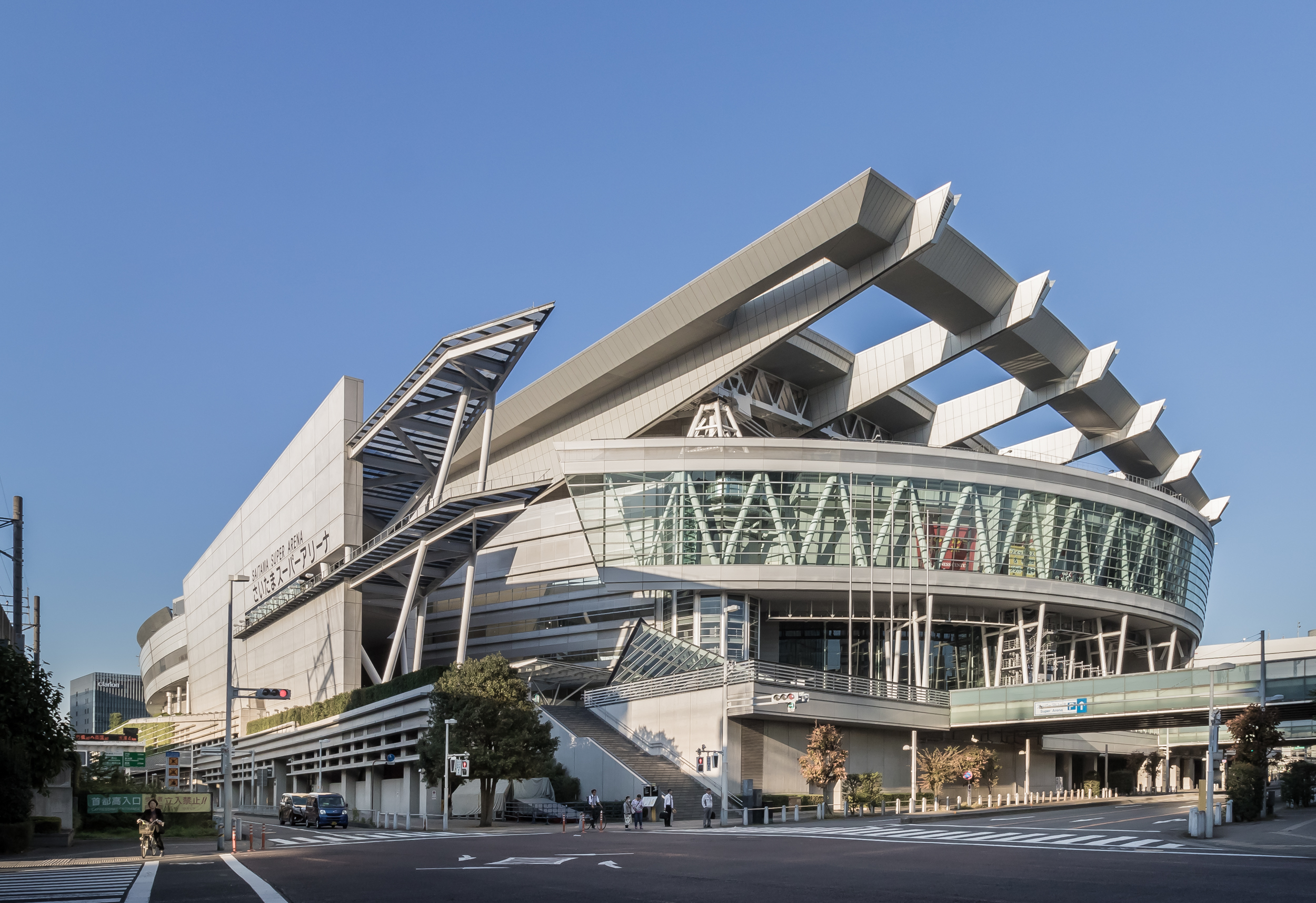
Saitama Super Arena

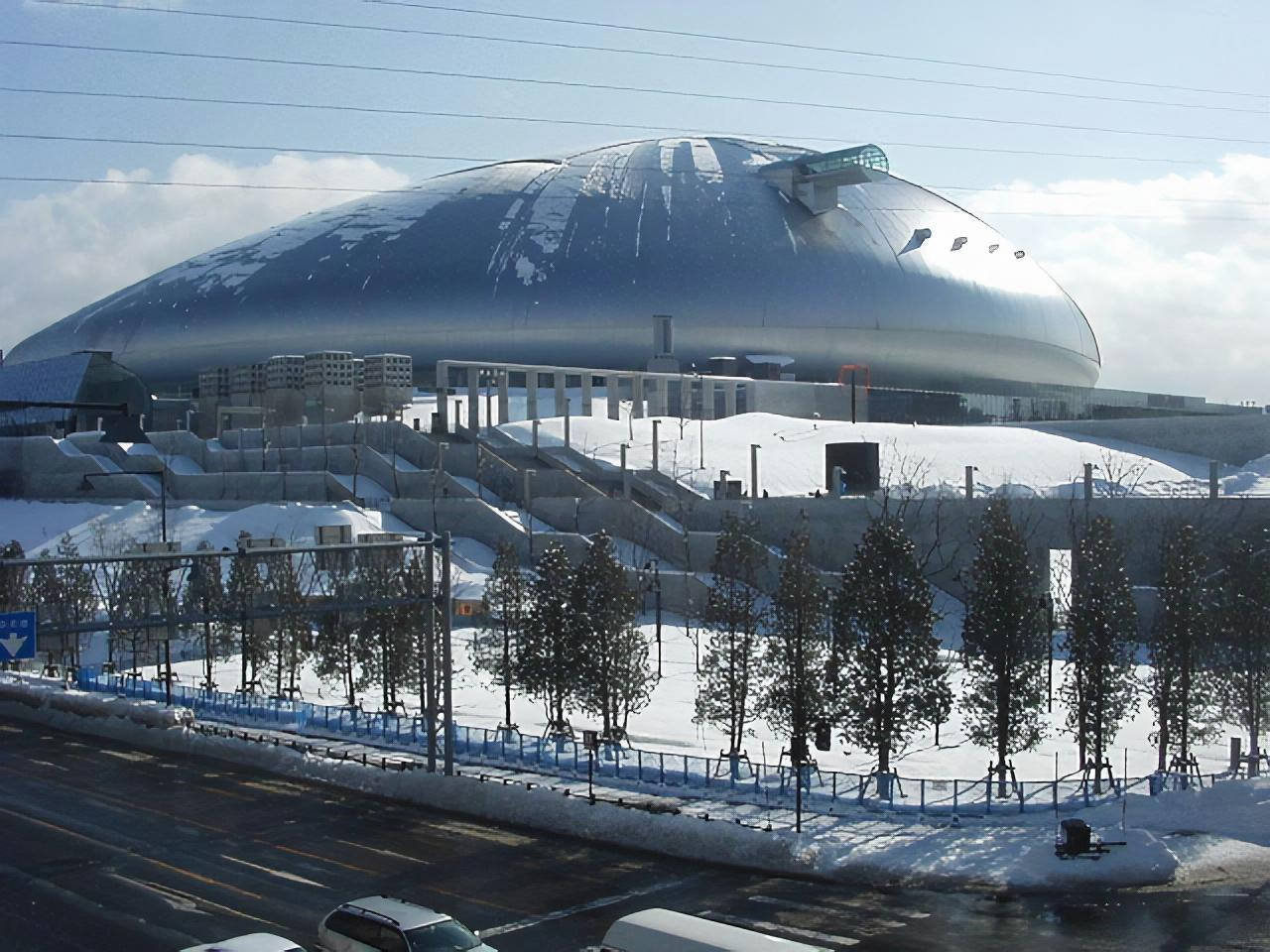
Sapporo Dome

Seoul Olympic Stadium

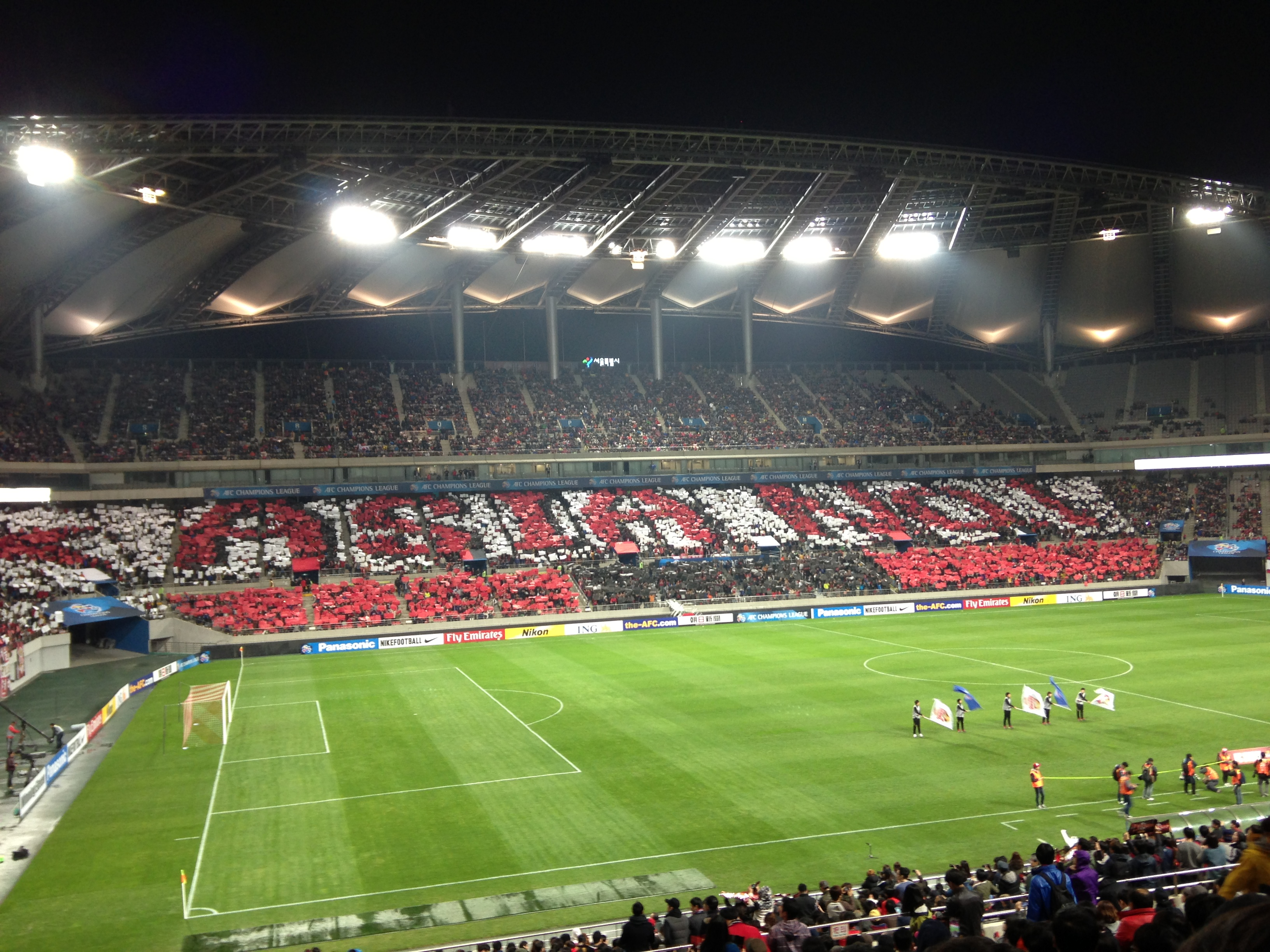
Seoul World Cup Stadium

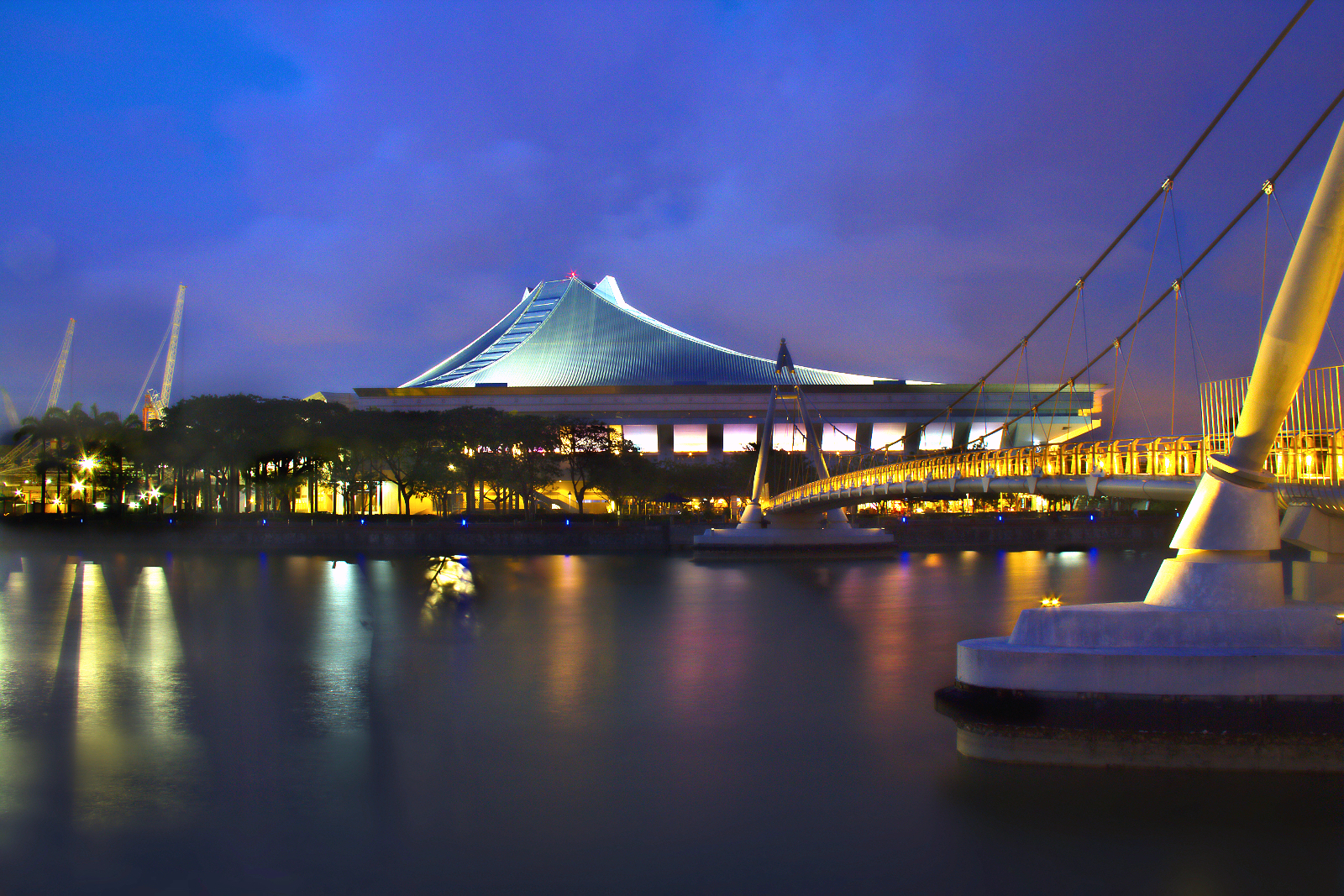
Singapore Indoor Stadium

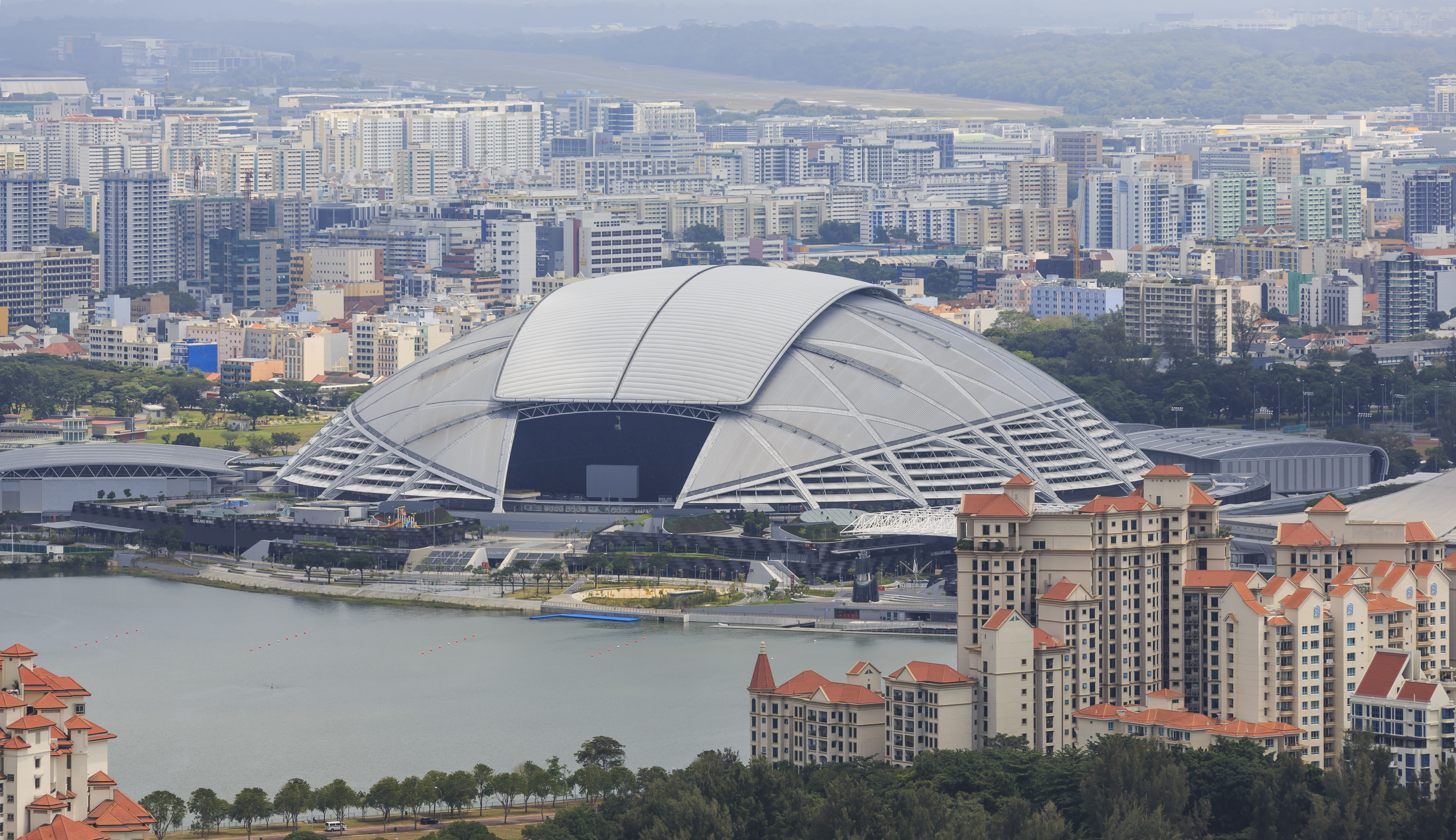
Singapore National Stadium

SK Olympic Handball Gymnasium

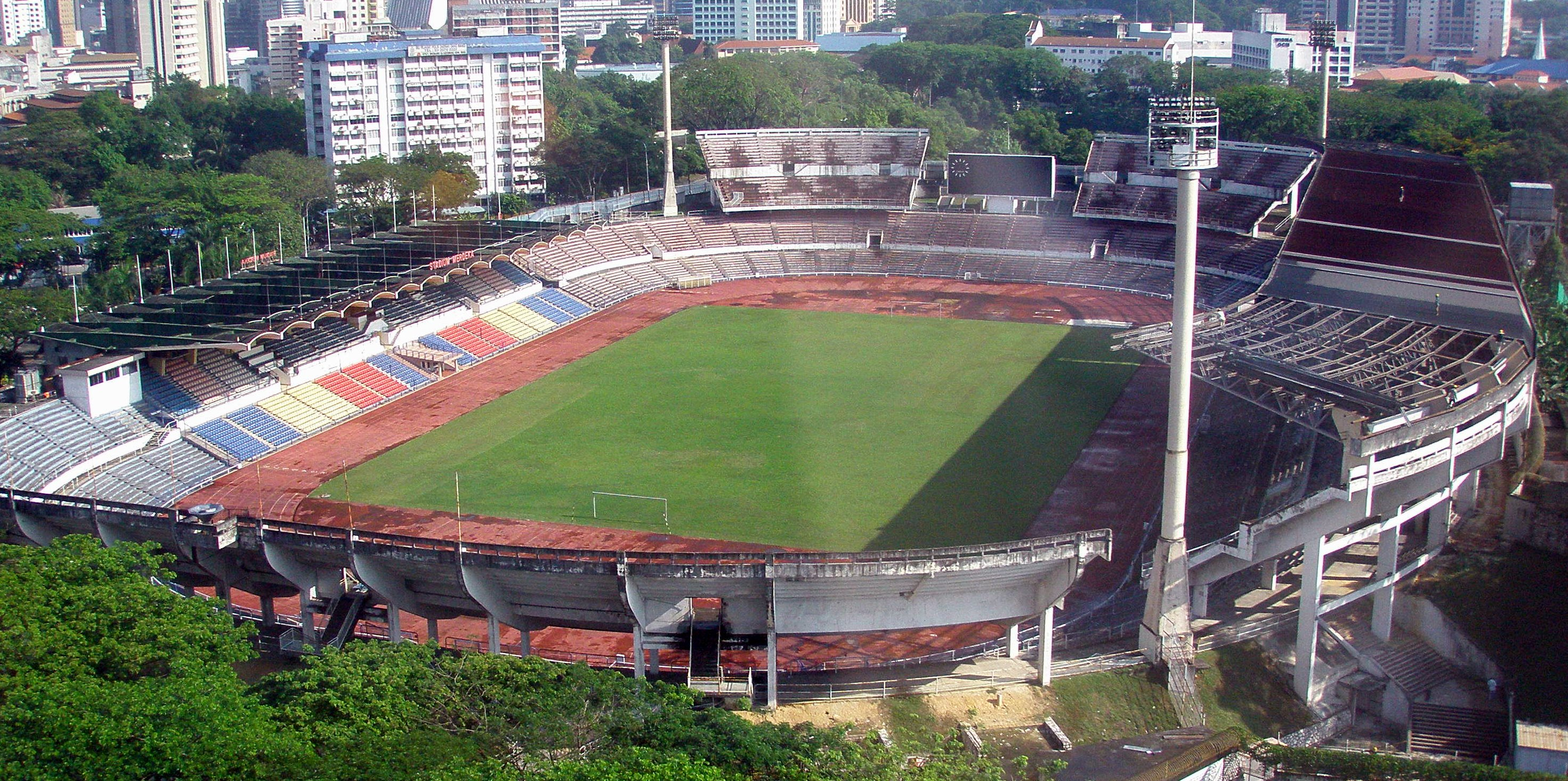
Stadium Merdeka

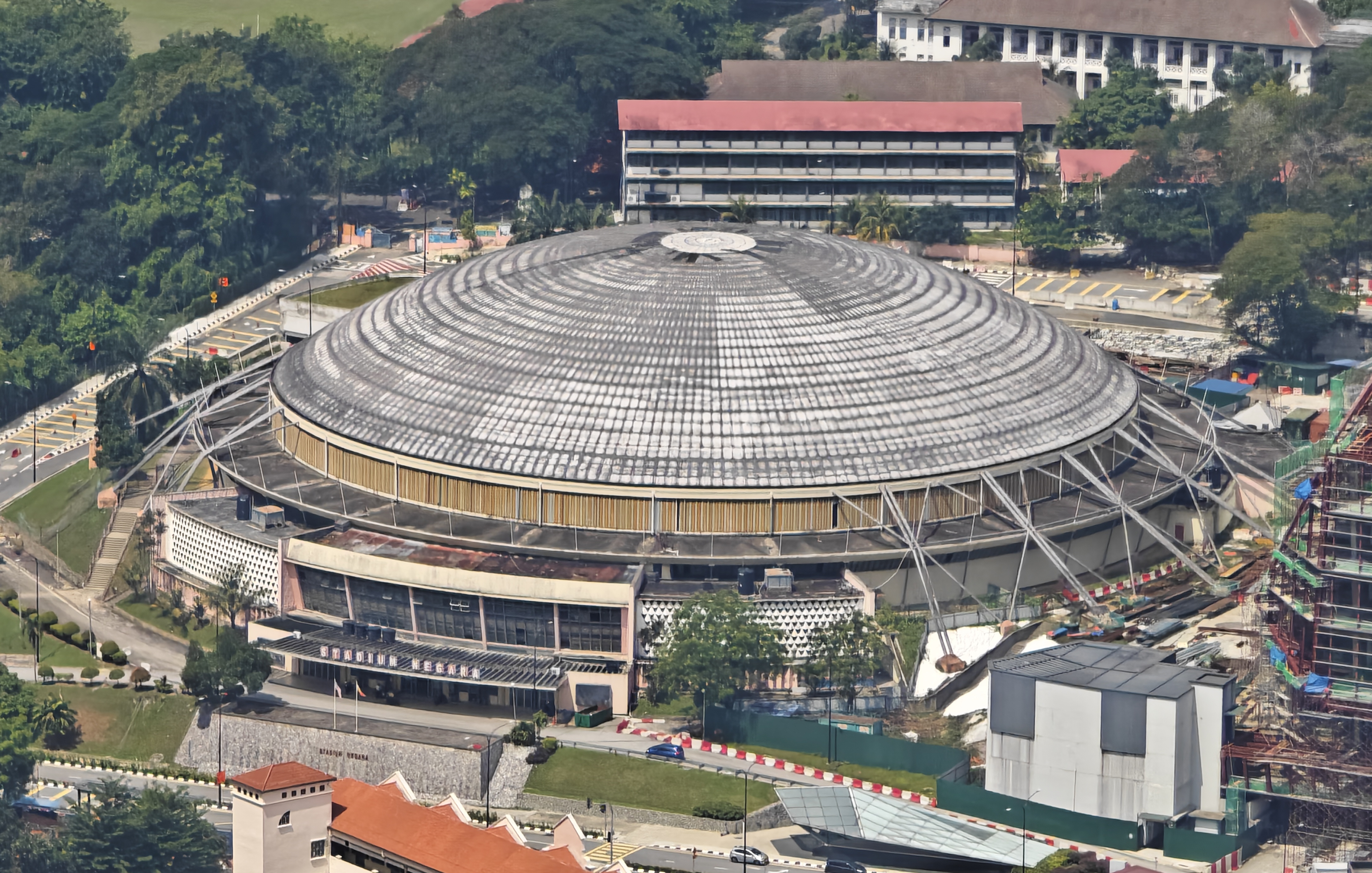
Stadium Negara

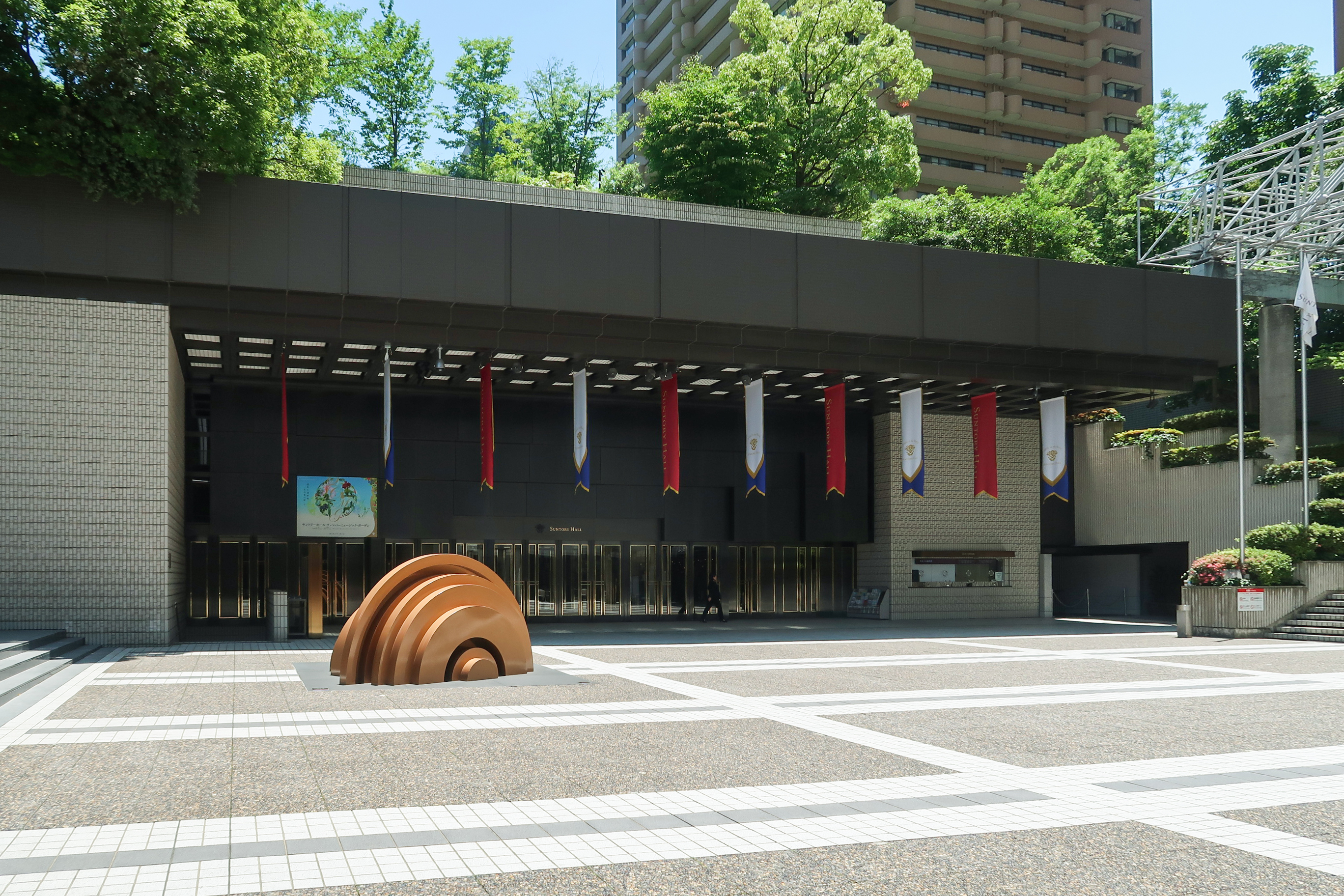
Suntory Hall

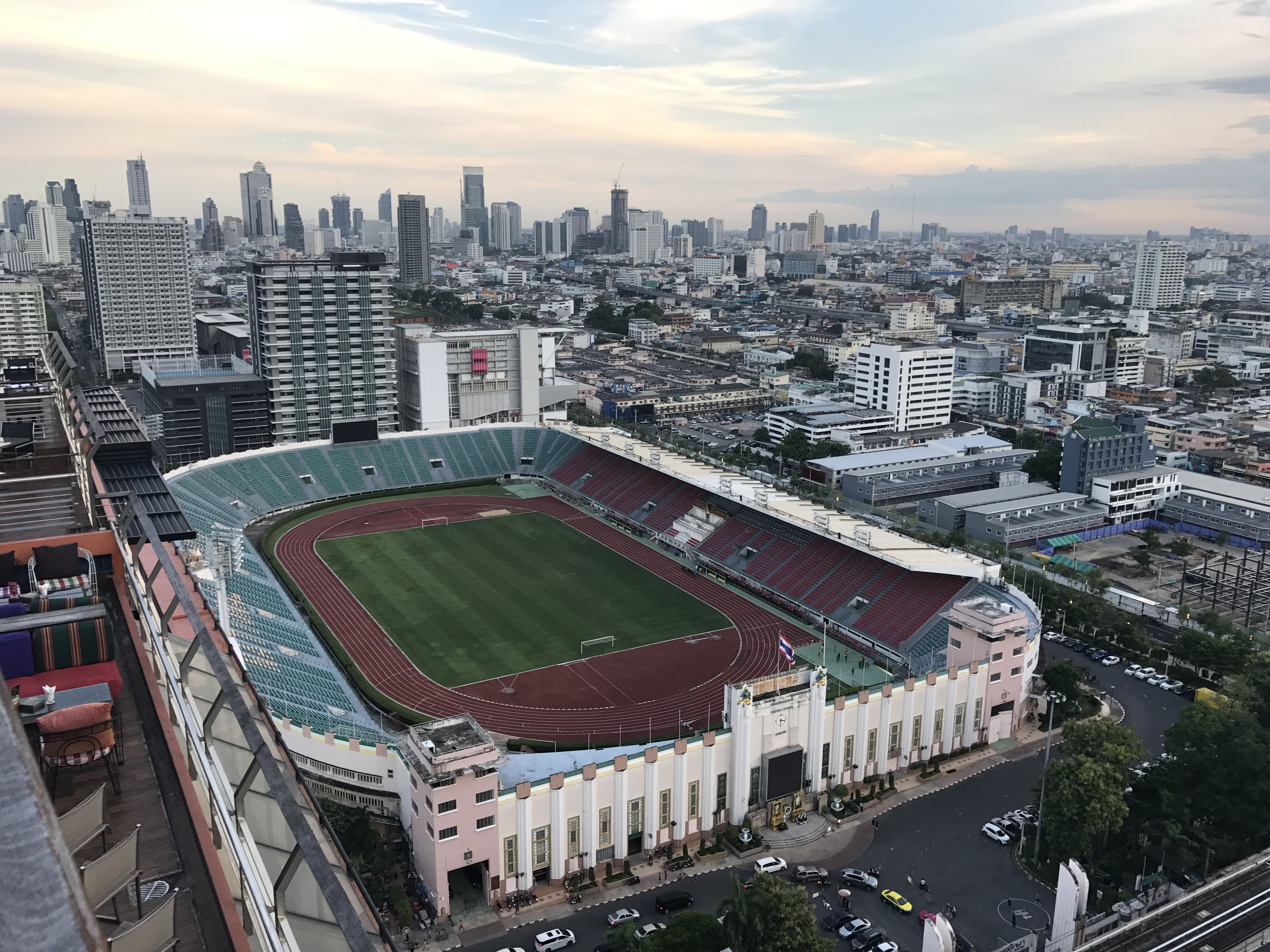
Suphachalasai Stadium

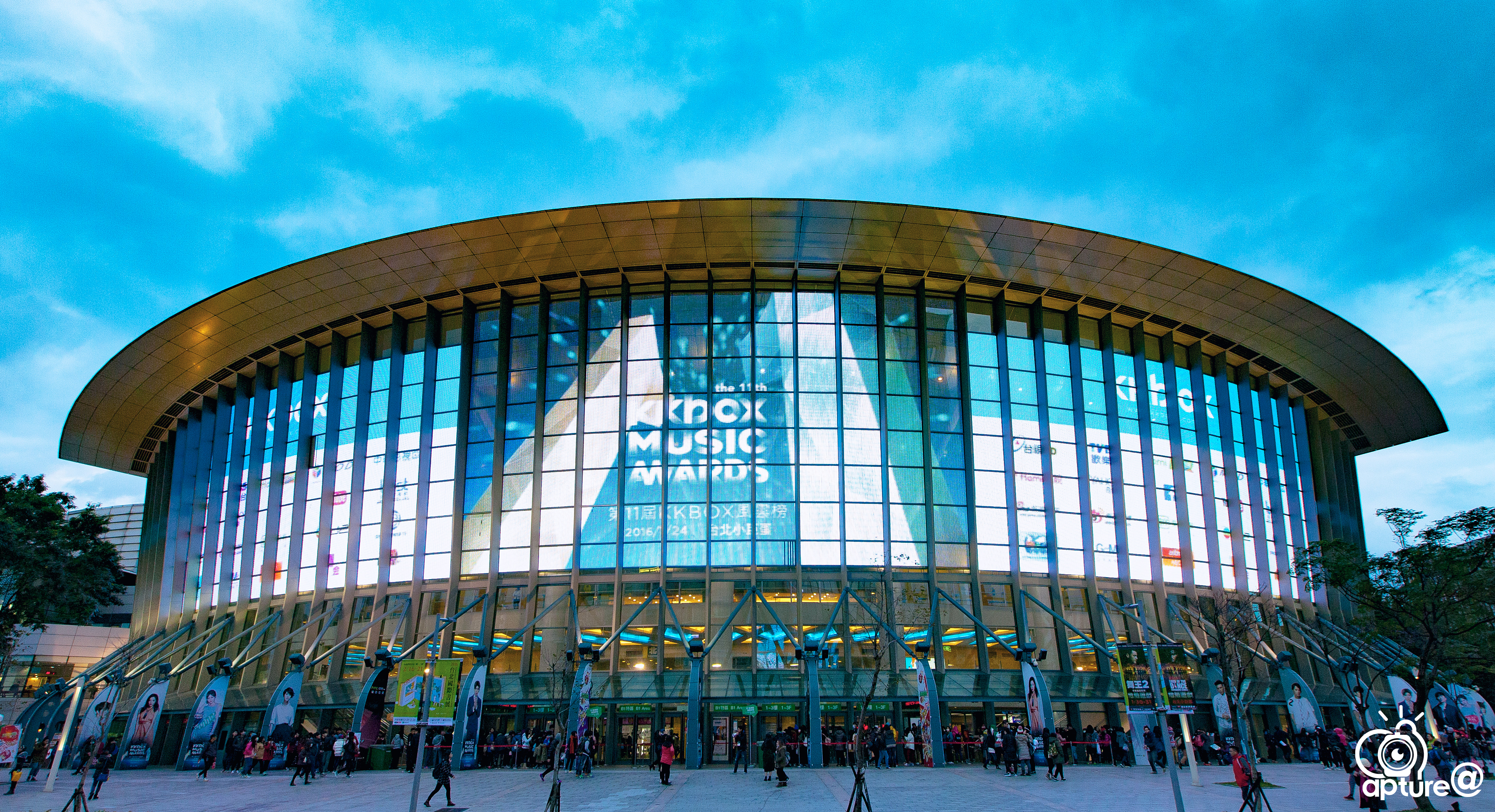
Taipei Arena

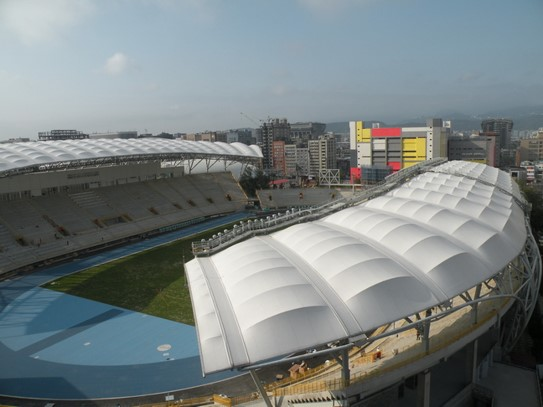
Taipei Municipal Stadium

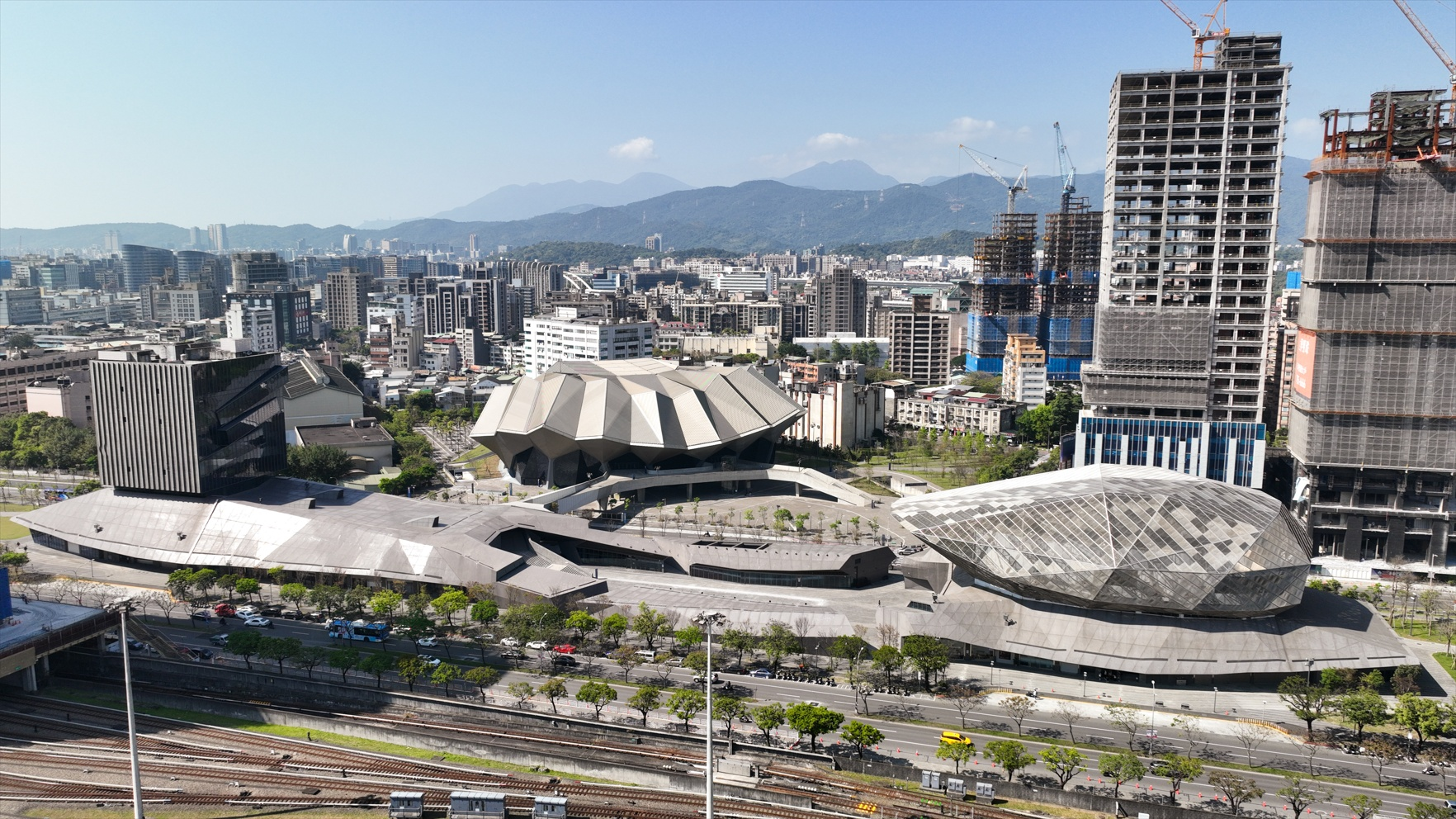
Taipei Music Center

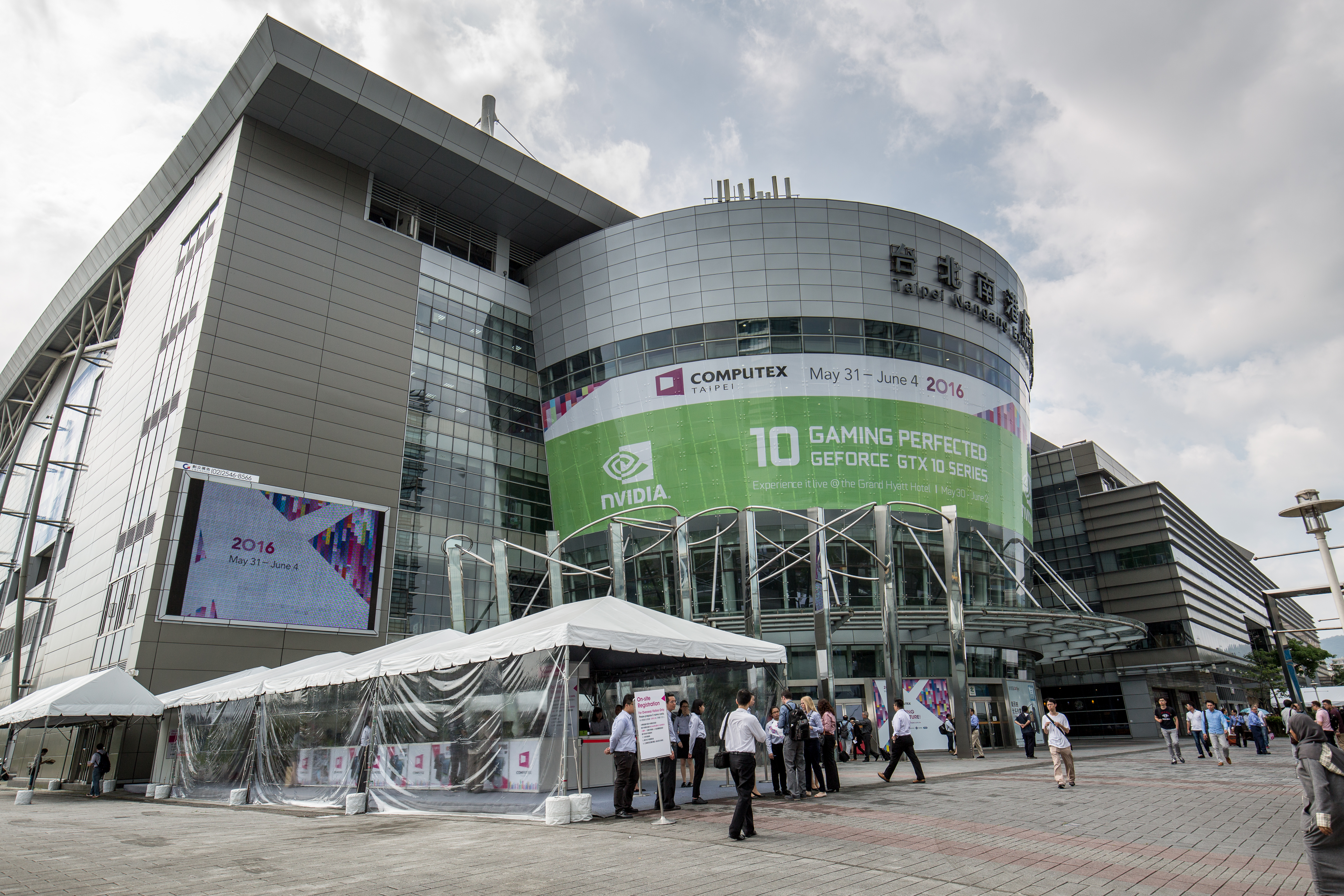
Taipei Nangang Exhibition Center

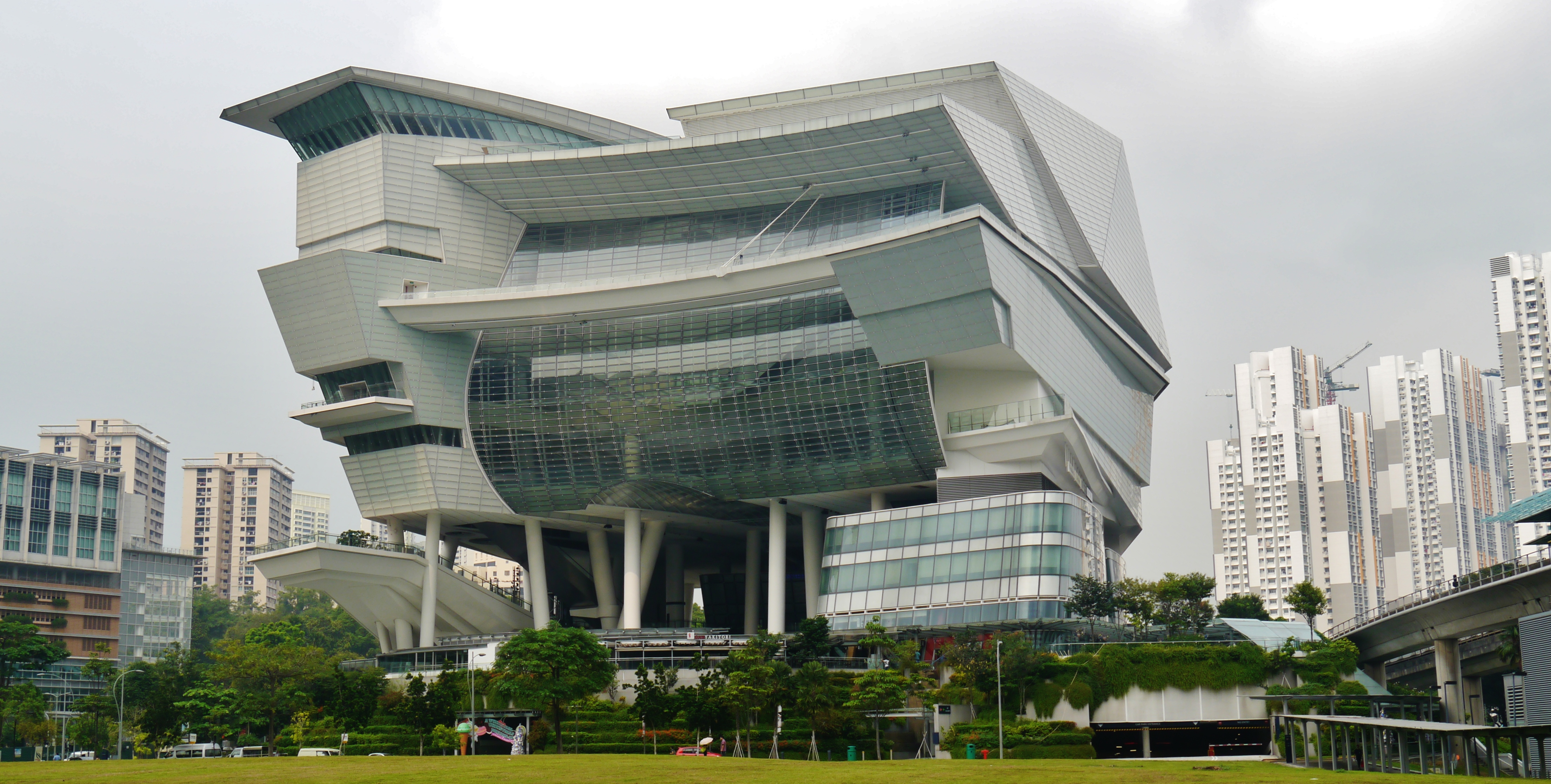
The Star

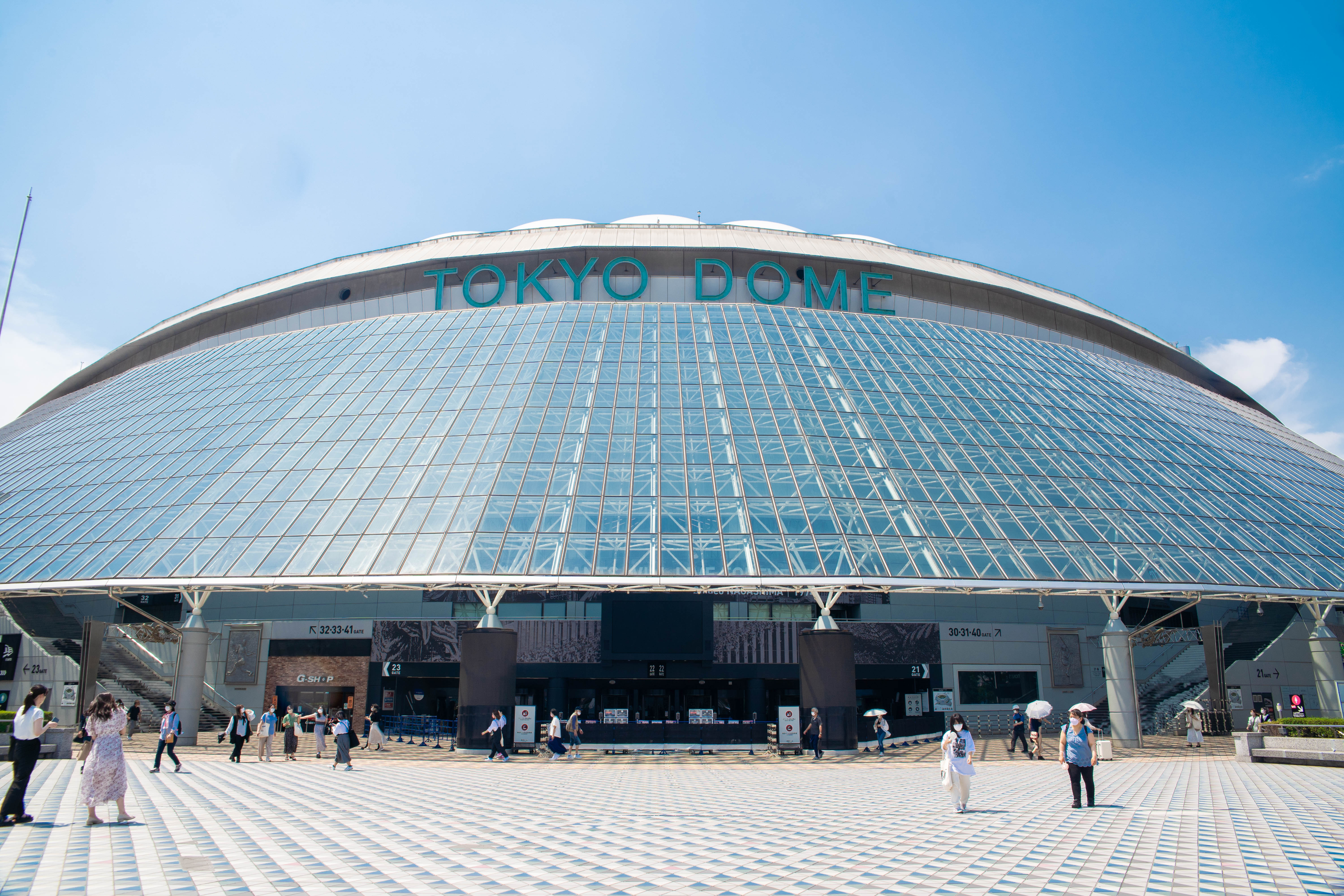
Tokyo Dome

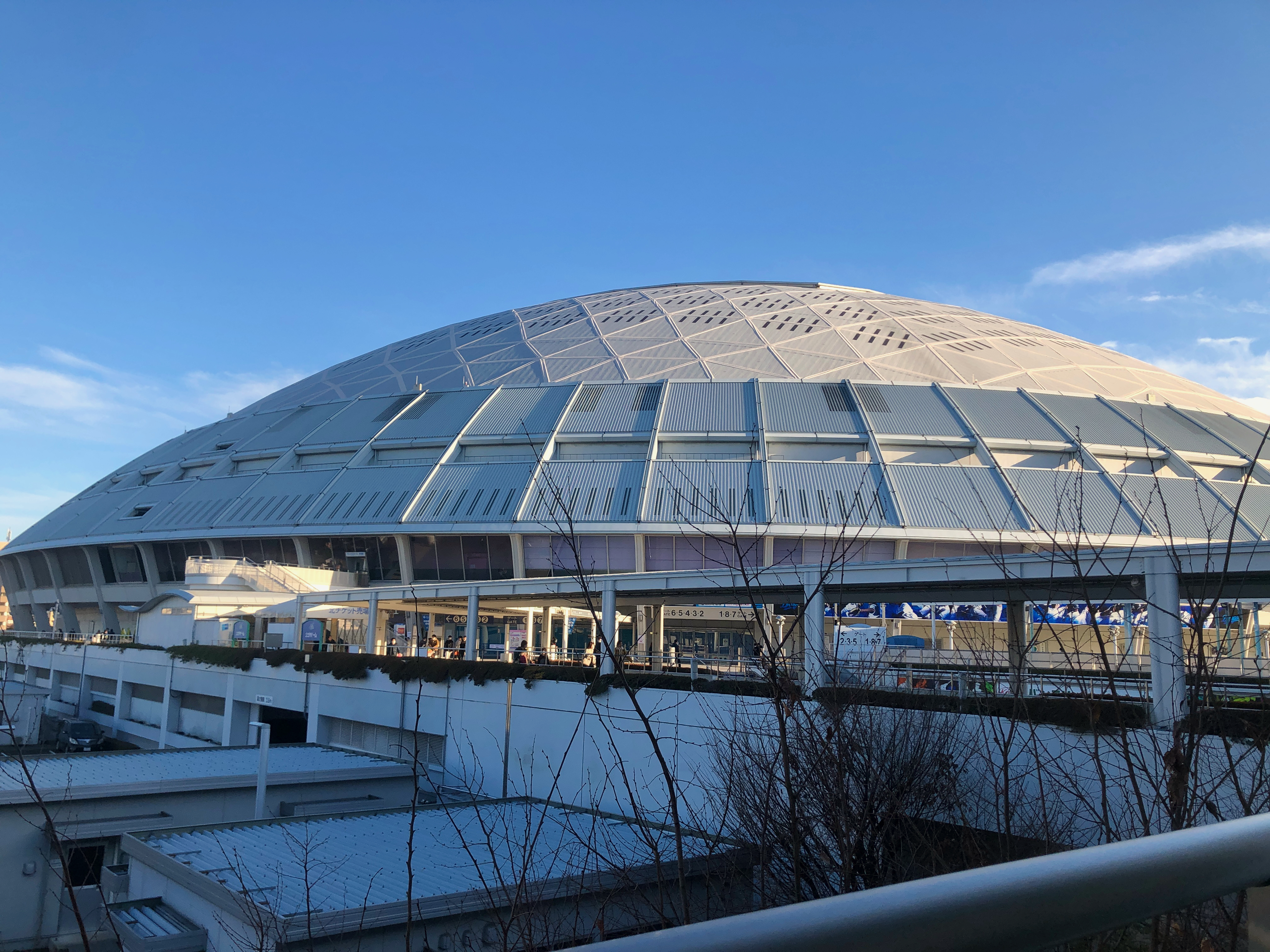
Vantelin Dome Nagoya

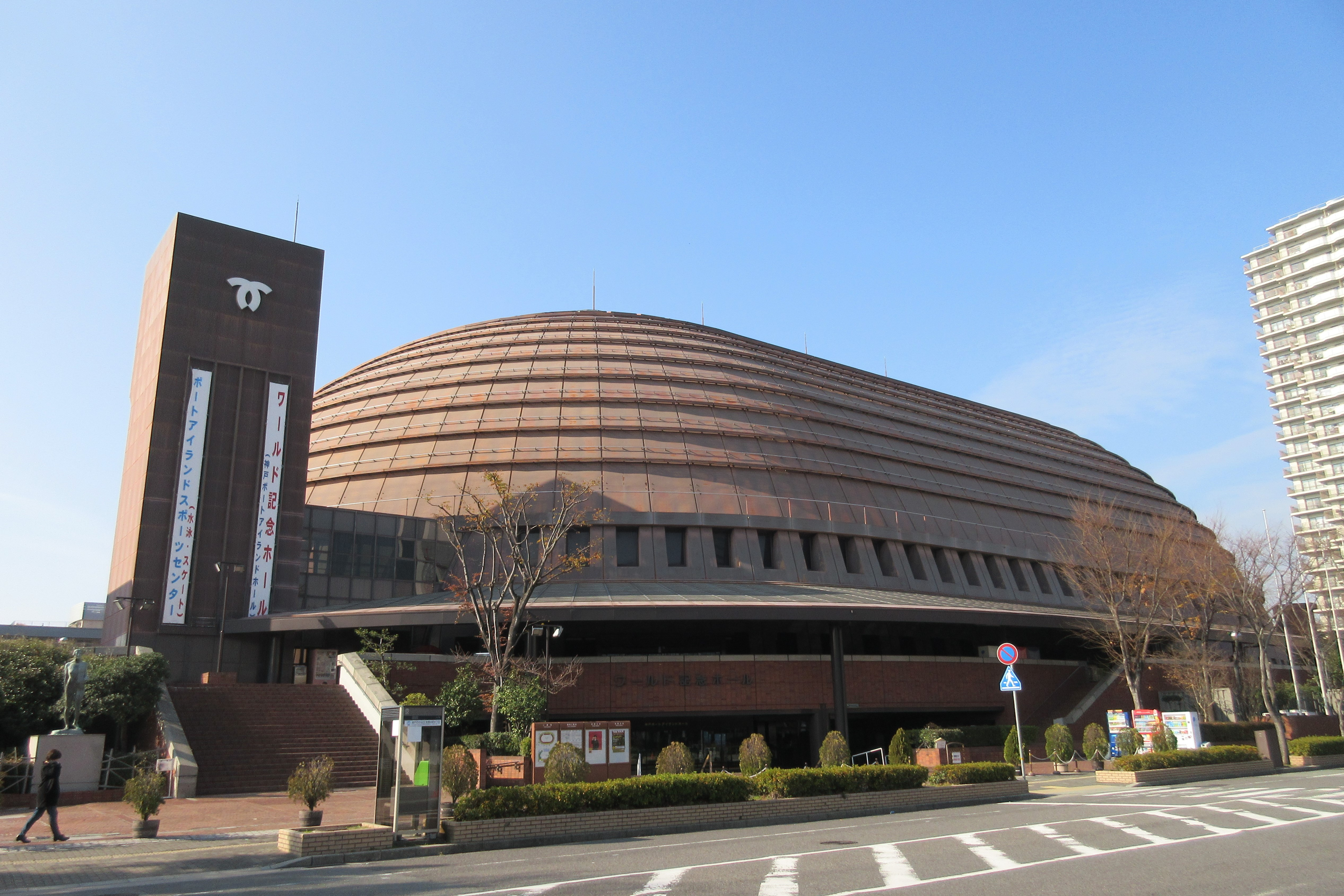
World Memorial Hall

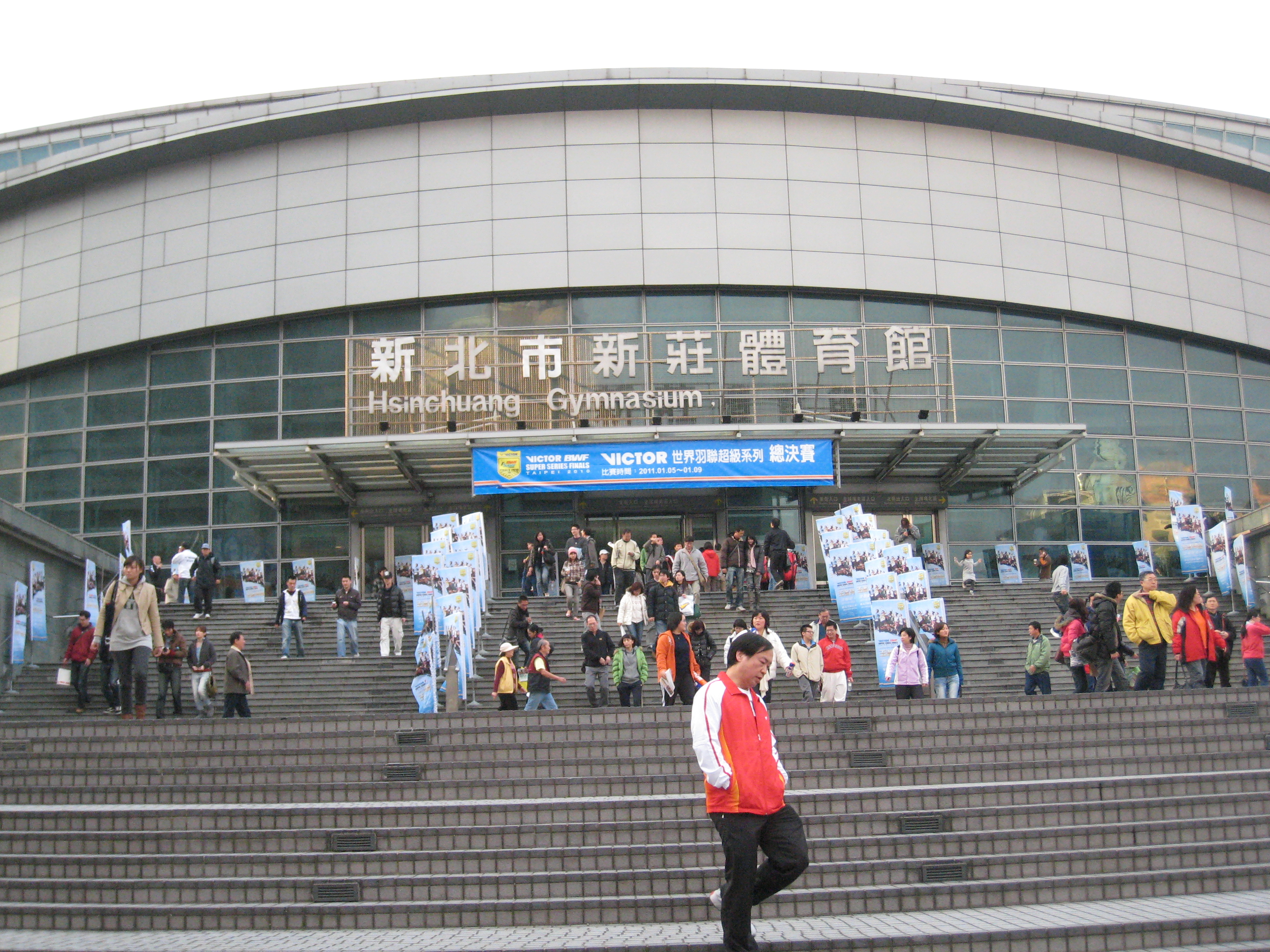
Xinzhuang Gymnasium

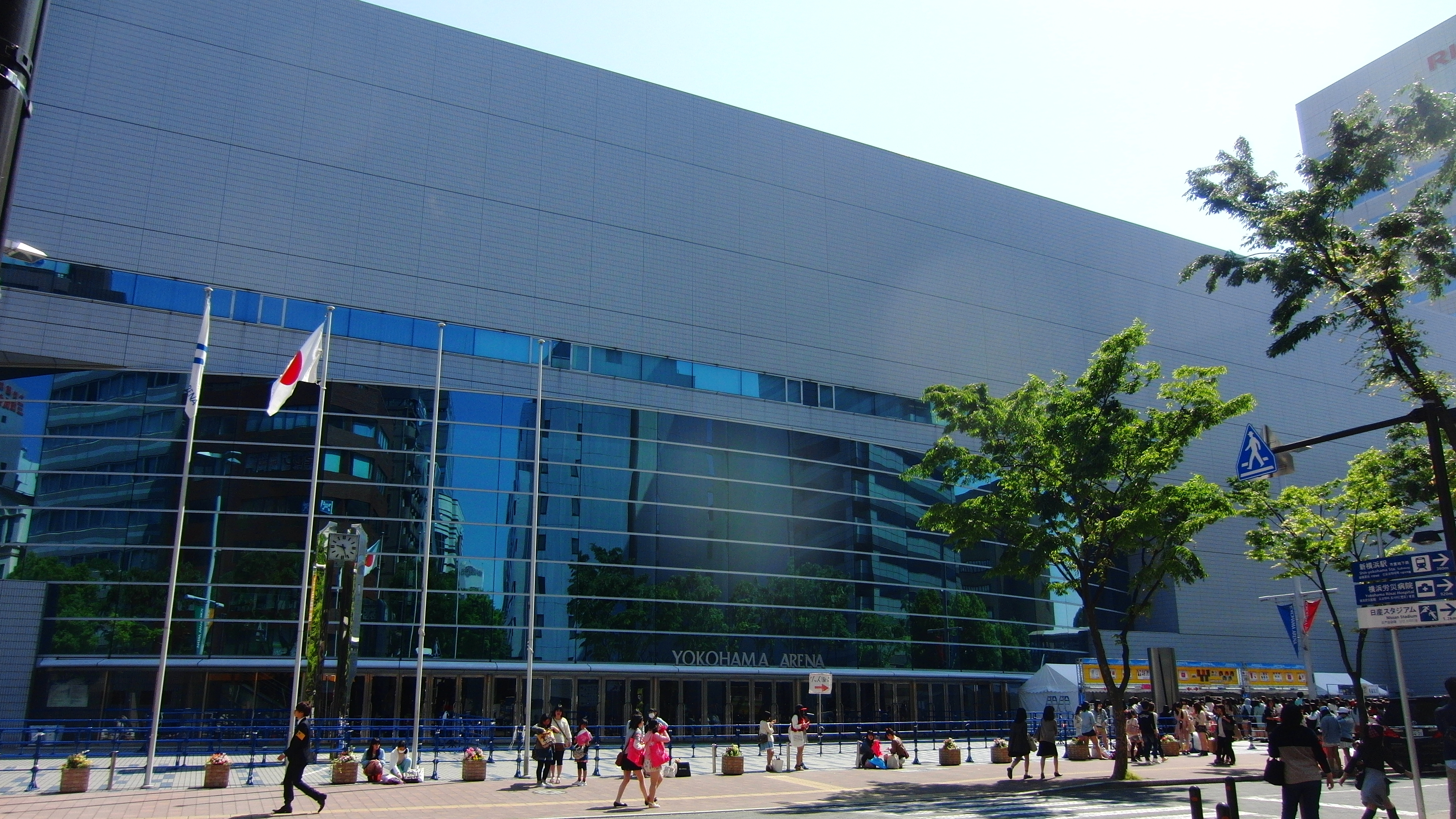
Yokohama Arena

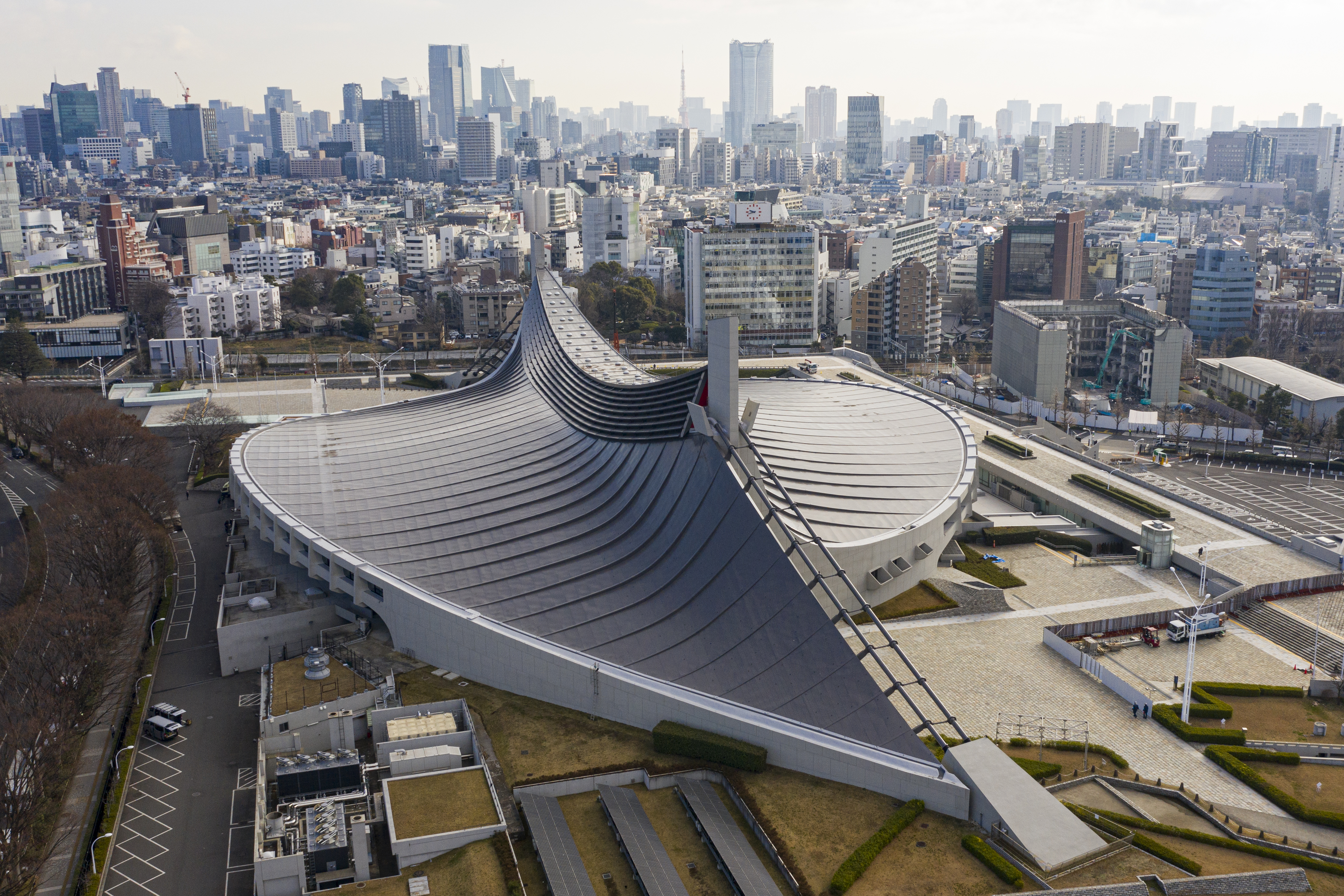
Yoyogi National Gymnasium

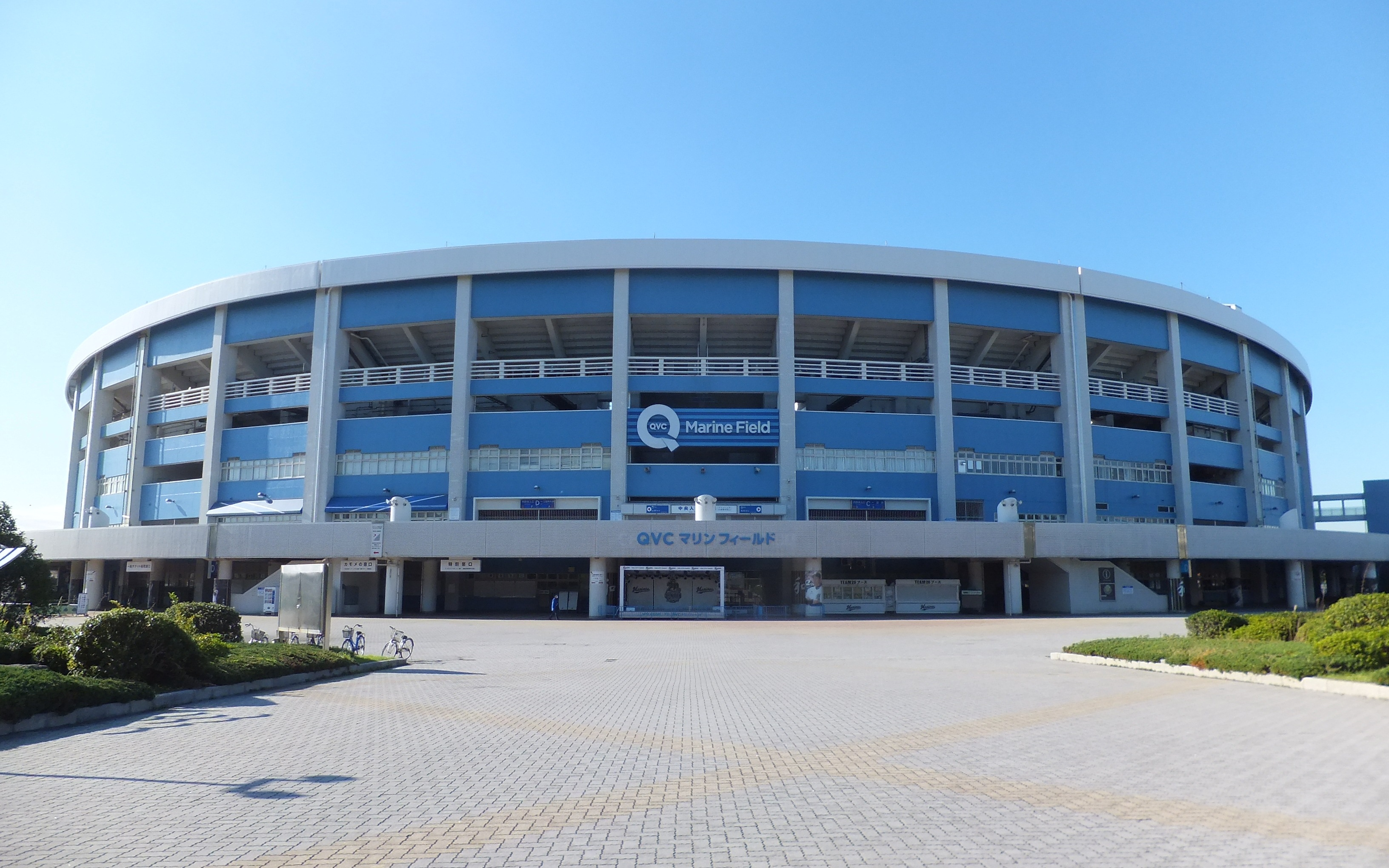
ZOZO Marine Stadium
