= Tokyo Metropolitan Theatre =

Tokyo Metropolitan Theatre 東京芸術劇場
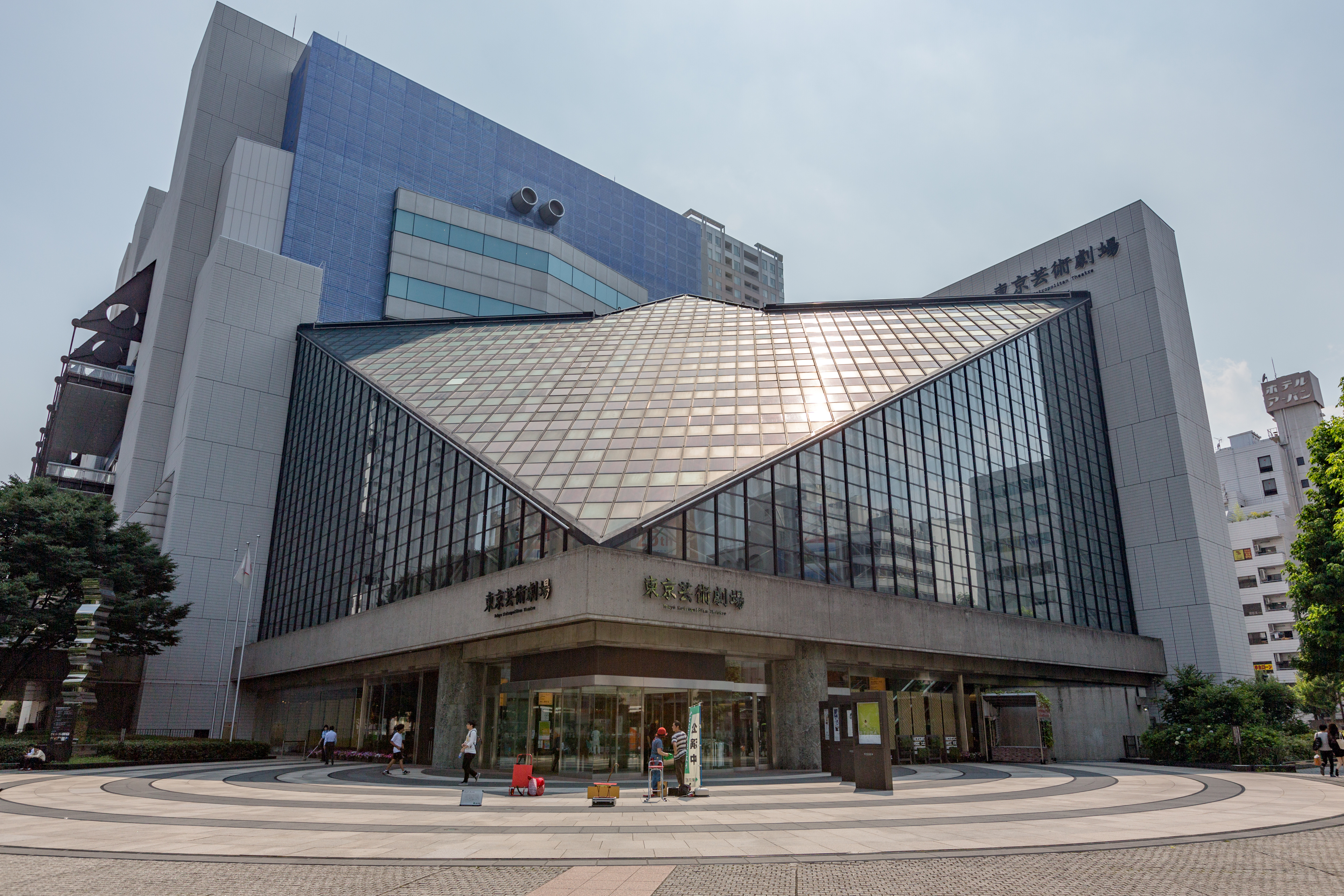
- The Tokyo Metropolitan Theatre in July 2015
- Interactive map of the Tokyo Metropolitan Theatre 東京芸術劇場 area
- Alternative names: Tokyo Metropolitan Art Space (until 2009)

General information
- Location: 1-8-1 Nishi-Ikebukuro, Toshima, Tokyo, Japan
- Coordinates: 35°43′47″N 139°42′29″E
- Opened: October 1990
- Cost: ¥29,100 million

Technical details
- Floor area: 49,739 m^{2}

Design and construction
- Architect: Yoshinobu Ashihara
- Other designers: Nagata Acoustics

Website
- www.geigeki.jp

References
- Factsheet

Tokyo Metropolitan Theatre (東京芸術劇場, Tōkyō Geijutsu Gekijō) is a centre for the performing arts located in Ikebukuro, Toshima, Tokyo, Japan.

== History ==
The theatre opened in 1990 and is operated by the Tokyo Metropolitan Foundation for History and Culture.

Yoshinobu Ashihara was the architect, with acoustical design by Nagata Acoustics.

== Performance spaces ==
The complex contains a concert hall with 1999 seats and a playhouse with 834 seats as well as a number of smaller spaces.

The organ of the great hall, built by the French organ builder Marc Garnier and inaugurated in 1991, is composed of three independent instruments of contrasting aesthetics (Dutch Renaissance, German Baroque and modern French) for a total of 126 sets and more than 9000 pipes. This organ also has the unique feature of having two facades and being able to turn.

== See also ==
- Suntory Hall
- Tokyo Bunka Kaikan
- Sumida Triphony Hall
- Ikebukuro Station
