= Yasuhisa Toyota =

Japanese acoustician

- Born: 1952 (age 73–74); Fukuyama, Hiroshima, Japan
- Education: Kyushu Institute of Design
- Occupation: Acoustician
- Employer: Nagata Acoustics

Yasuhisa Toyota (豊田 泰久, Toyota Yasuhisa) (born 1952) is a Japanese acoustician, who has been chief acoustician for over 50 projects worldwide, including the Walt Disney Concert Hall, Suntory Hall in Tokyo, the Bard College Performing Arts Center in New York, the Elbphilharmonie in Hamburg, and the Kauffman Center for the Performing Arts in Kansas City. He is the company director and U.S. Representative of Nagata Acoustics of Tokyo.

Toyota was born and raised in Fukuyama, Hiroshima Prefecture and graduated from the Kyushu Institute of Design in 1972. He has been employed by Nagata Acoustics since 1977.

His works have included the Shenzhen Cultural Center Concert Hall for the People's Republic of China, Finland's Helsinki Music Centre, the Danish Radio Concert Hall in Copenhagen, Polish National Radio Symphony Orchestra in Katowice, the Bing Concert Hall at Stanford University, Musco Center for the Arts at Chapman University, the Elbe Philharmonic Hall in Hamburg and the renovation of the Sydney Opera House Concert Hall. He has also worked on Miami Beach's New World Center.

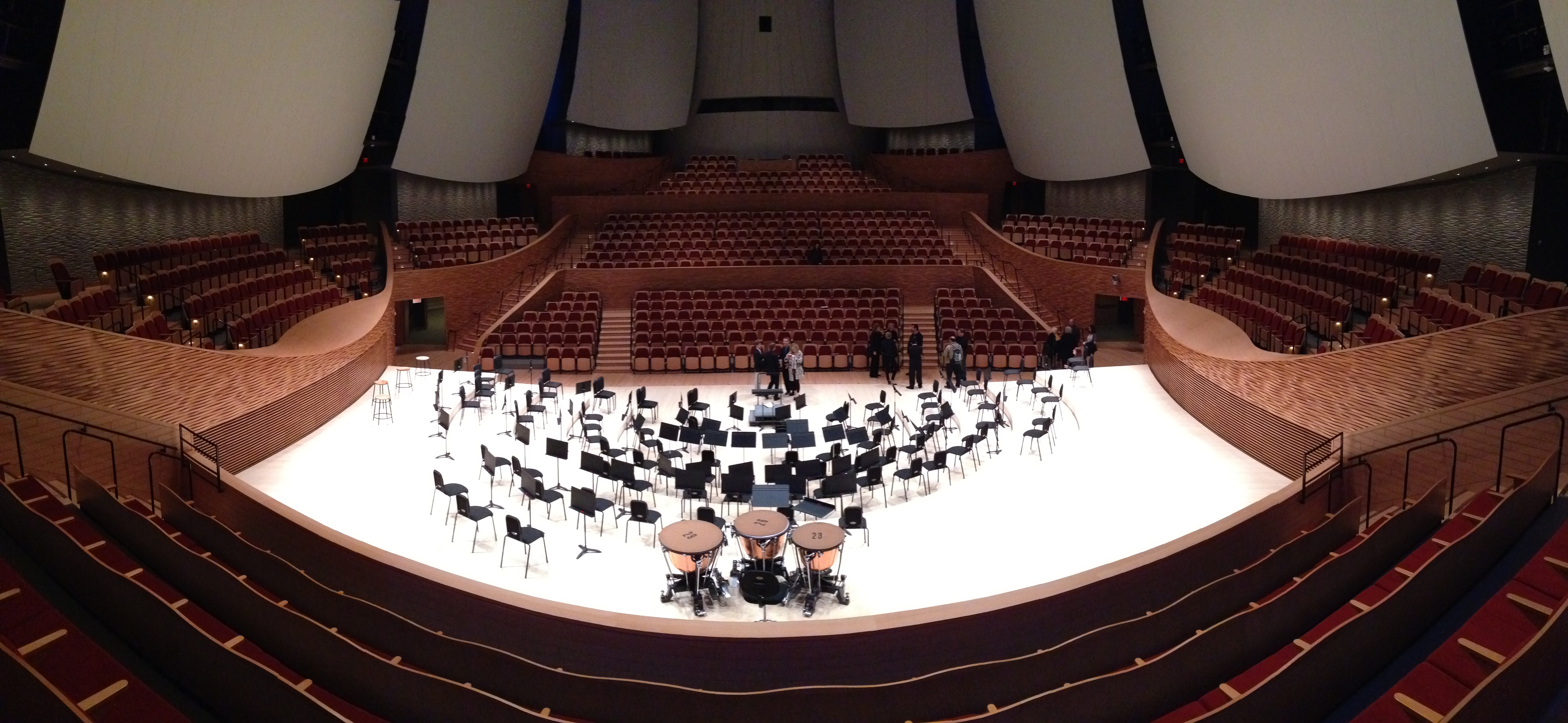
Interior of the Bing Concert Hall from the Choral Terrace, Fotograph Phil King

== See also ==
- Acoustical engineering
- Vineyard style (architecture)
- Nagata Acoustics
