= Fukushima City Concert Hall =

Fukushima City Concert Hall 福島市音楽堂
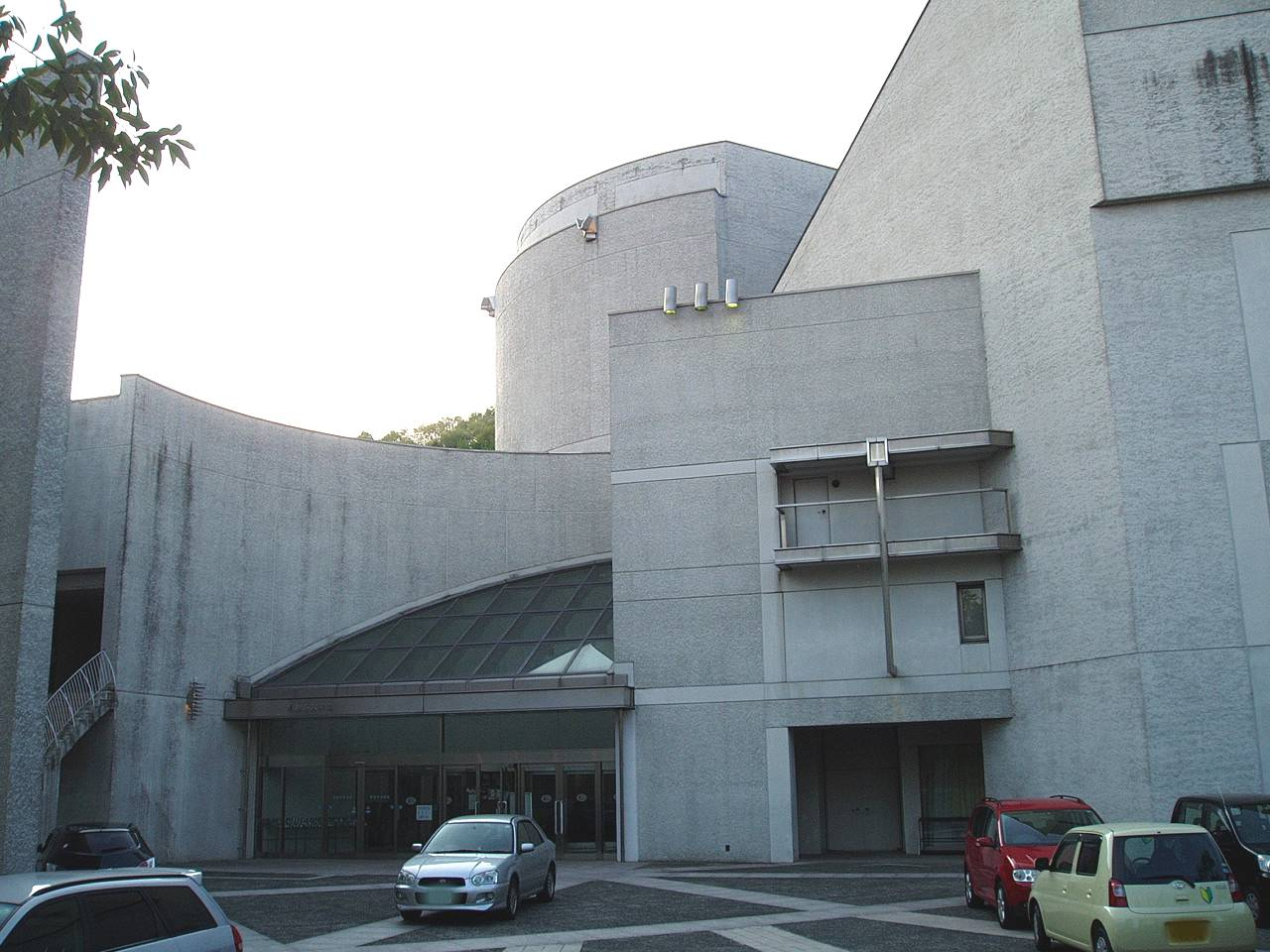
- Alternative names: Fukushima Ongakudō

General information
- Location: 1-1 Irie-chō, Fukushima, Fukushima, Japan
- Coordinates: 37°46′11″N 140°28′43″E
- Completed: 1984
- Cost: ¥ 3,700 million

Technical details
- Floor area: 6,023 m^{2}

Design and construction
- Architect: Okada & Associates
- Other designers: Nagata Acoustics

Website
- Hompepage (Jp)

References
- Factsheet

Fukushima City Concert Hall (福島市音楽堂, Fukushima-shi ongakudō), also known as Fukushin Dream Ongakudo (ふくしん夢の音楽堂, Fukushin Yumeno Ongakudō) is a concert hall in Fukushima city, Fukushima Prefecture, Japan. It opened in 1984 and has a shoebox-style auditorium with 1,000 seats and a smaller hall with a capacity of 200. Okada & Associates were the architects, with acoustical design by Nagata Acoustics. The 41 stop organ is by Marcussen.
