= Kyoto Concert Hall =

Kyoto Concert Hall 京都コンサートホール
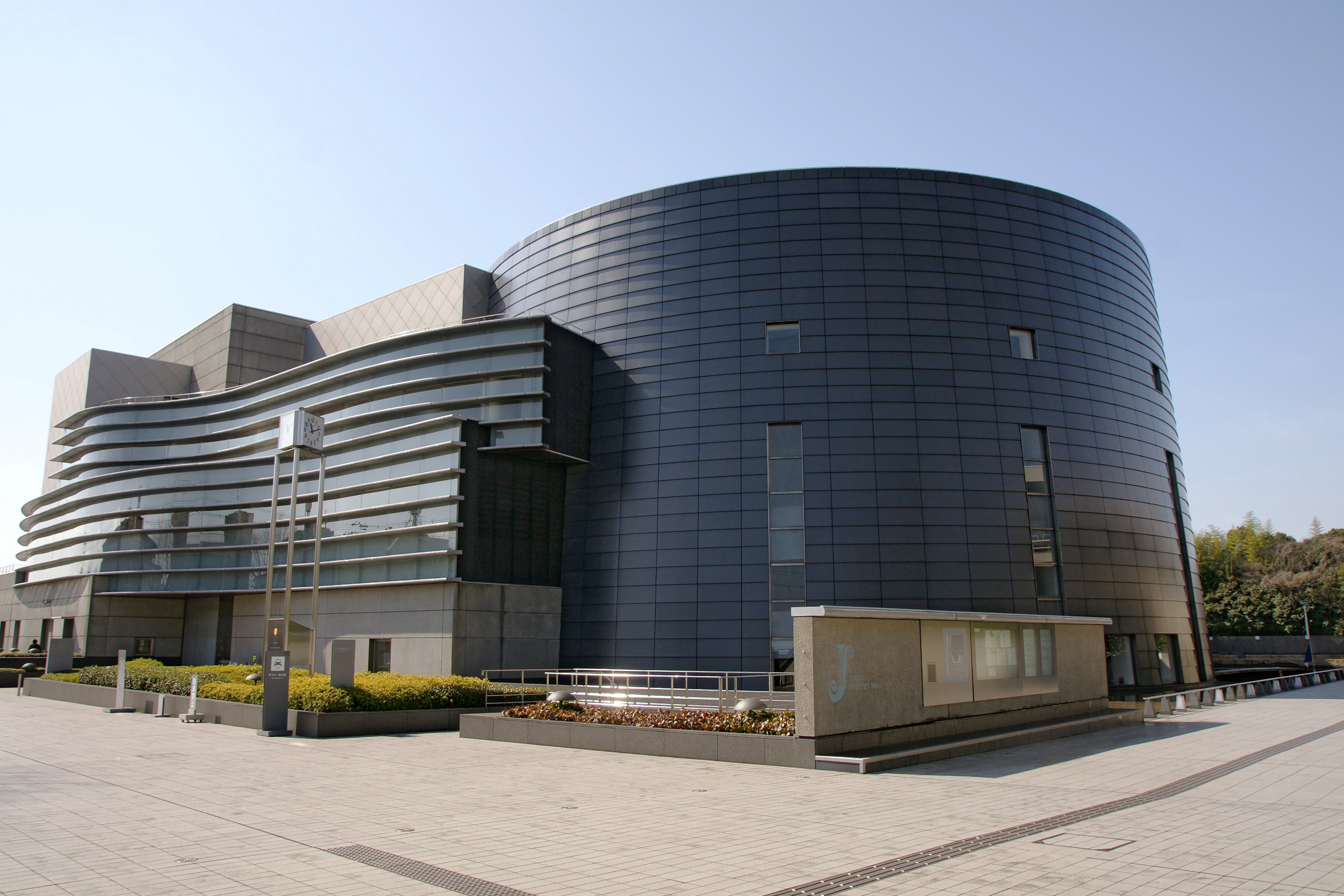
- Interactive map of the Kyoto Concert Hall 京都コンサートホール area

General information
- Location: 1-26 Hangi-chō, Shimogamo, Sakyō-ku, Kyoto, Japan
- Coordinates: 35°3′0″N 135°46′0″E
- Opened: 1995
- Cost: ¥ 16,700 million
- Owner: Kyoto City

Technical details
- Floor area: 3,590 m^{2}

Design and construction
- Architect: Arata Isozaki
- Other designers: Nagata Acoustics

Website
- Hompepage

References
- Factsheet

Kyoto Concert Hall (京都コンサートホール, Kyōto Konsāto Hōlu) is a concert hall in Sakyō-ku, Kyoto, Japan. It opened in 1995 as part of the 1200th anniversary celebrations of the foundation of Heian-kyō. The shoebox-style Main Hall seats 1833 and the Ensemble Hall Murata 500. It is the home of the Kyoto Symphony Orchestra (京都市交響楽団). Arata Isozaki was the architect, with acoustical design by Nagata Acoustics.

== See also ==
- Kyoto Kaikan
- Minami-za
- Shimogamo Shrine
