= Sumida Triphony Hall =

Sumida Triphony Hall すみだトリフォニーホール
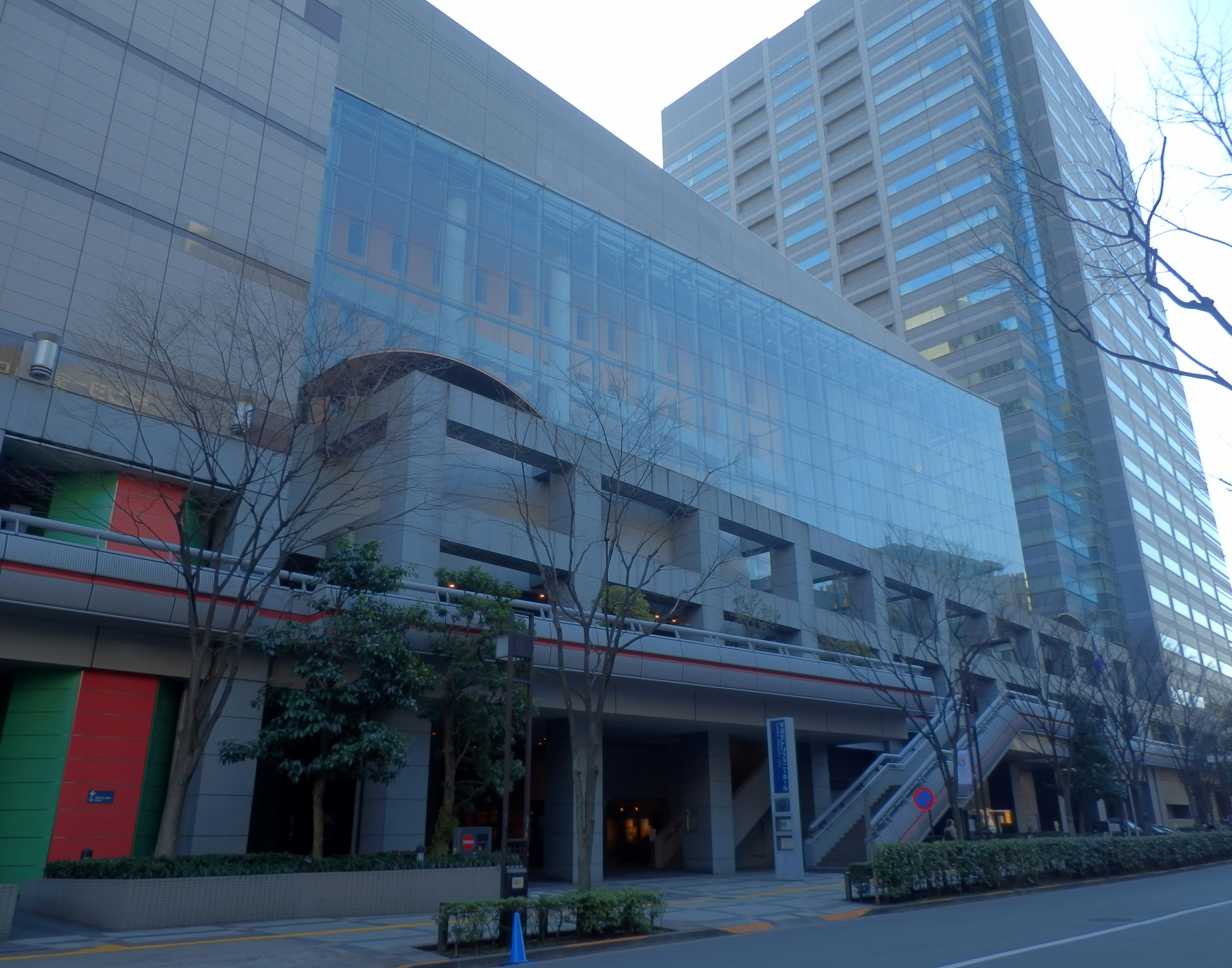
- Interactive map of the Sumida Triphony Hall すみだトリフォニーホール area

General information
- Location: 1-2-3 Kinshi, Sumida, Tokyo, Japan
- Coordinates: 35°41′50″N 139°48′37″E
- Opened: October 1997
- Cost: ¥ 19,960 million
- Owner: Sumida Ward

Technical details
- Floor area: 20,066 m^{2}

Design and construction
- Architect: Nikken Sekkei
- Other designers: Nagata Acoustics

Website
- triphony.com (in Japanese)

References
- Factsheet

Sumida Triphony Hall (すみだトリフォニーホール, Sumida Torifonī Hōlu) is a concert hall in Sumida, Tokyo, Japan. It opened in 1997 and has two auditoria; the main hall, with 1,801 seats; and the small hall, with 252 seats. It is the home of the New Japan Philharmonic. Nikken Sekkei were the architects, with acoustical design by Nagata Acoustics, who tested their concept with a 1:10 model.

== See also ==
- Kinshichō Station
- Suntory Hall
