= Bing Concert Hall =

Performing Arts Facility at Stanford University

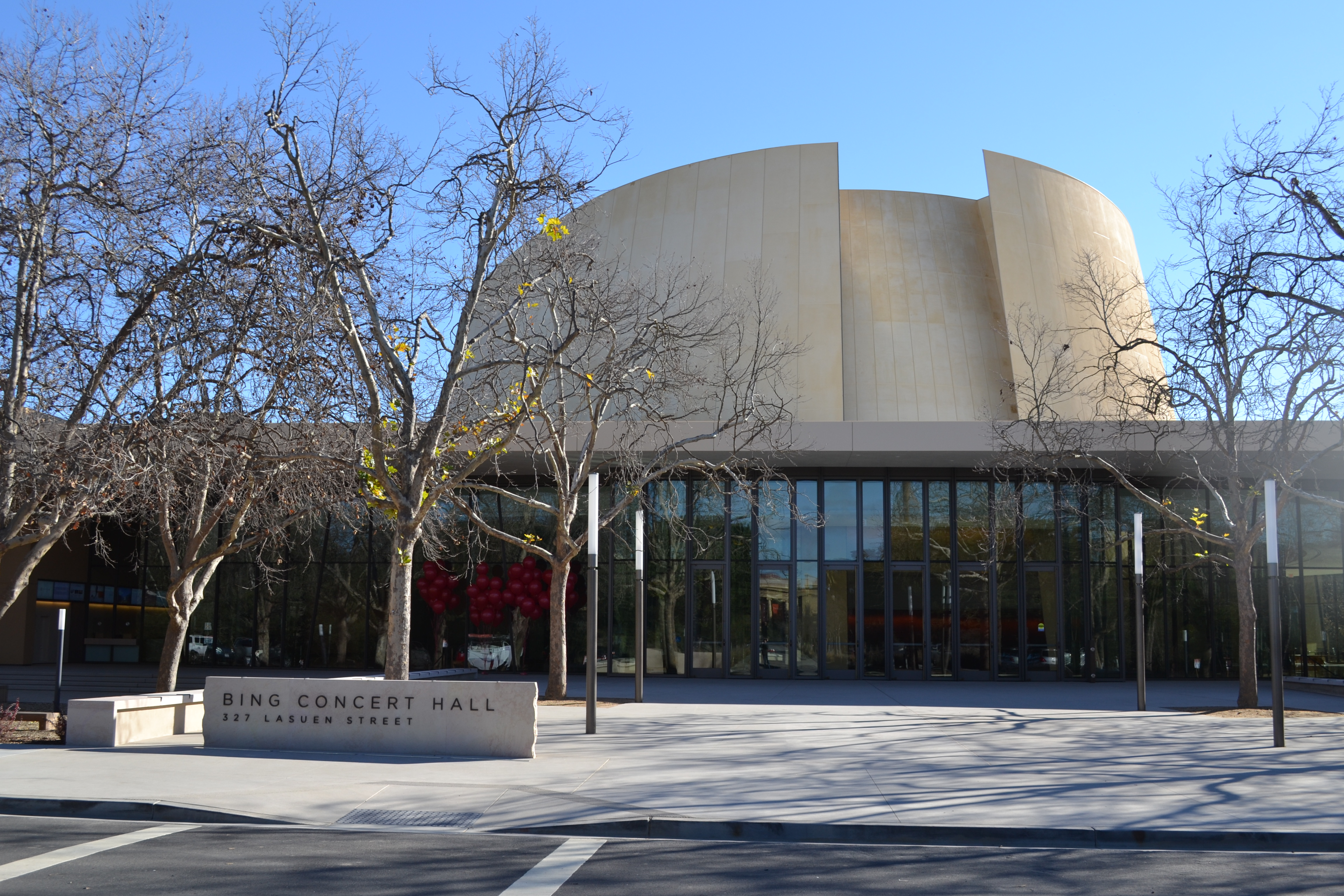
- Interactive map of Bing Concert Hall
- Address: 327 Lasuen Street; Stanford, California; United States
- Coordinates: 37°25′55″N 122°9′58″W
- Owner: Stanford University
- Capacity: 842
- Type: Concert hall

Construction
- Opened: January 2013
- Architects: Richard Olcott, Ennead Architects

Website
- live.stanford.edu

Bing Concert Hall is a performing arts facility at Stanford University that opened in January 2013. The heart of the building is the oval-shaped concert hall, which has 842 seats arranged in a vineyard style surrounding the stage in terraces. All the seats are within 75 feet of the conductor, and the seats in the center section begin at the stage level. On the north side of the central concert hall is the smaller Bing Studio, which can be configured to accommodate a variety of performance types, e.g., cabaret, club, and theater.

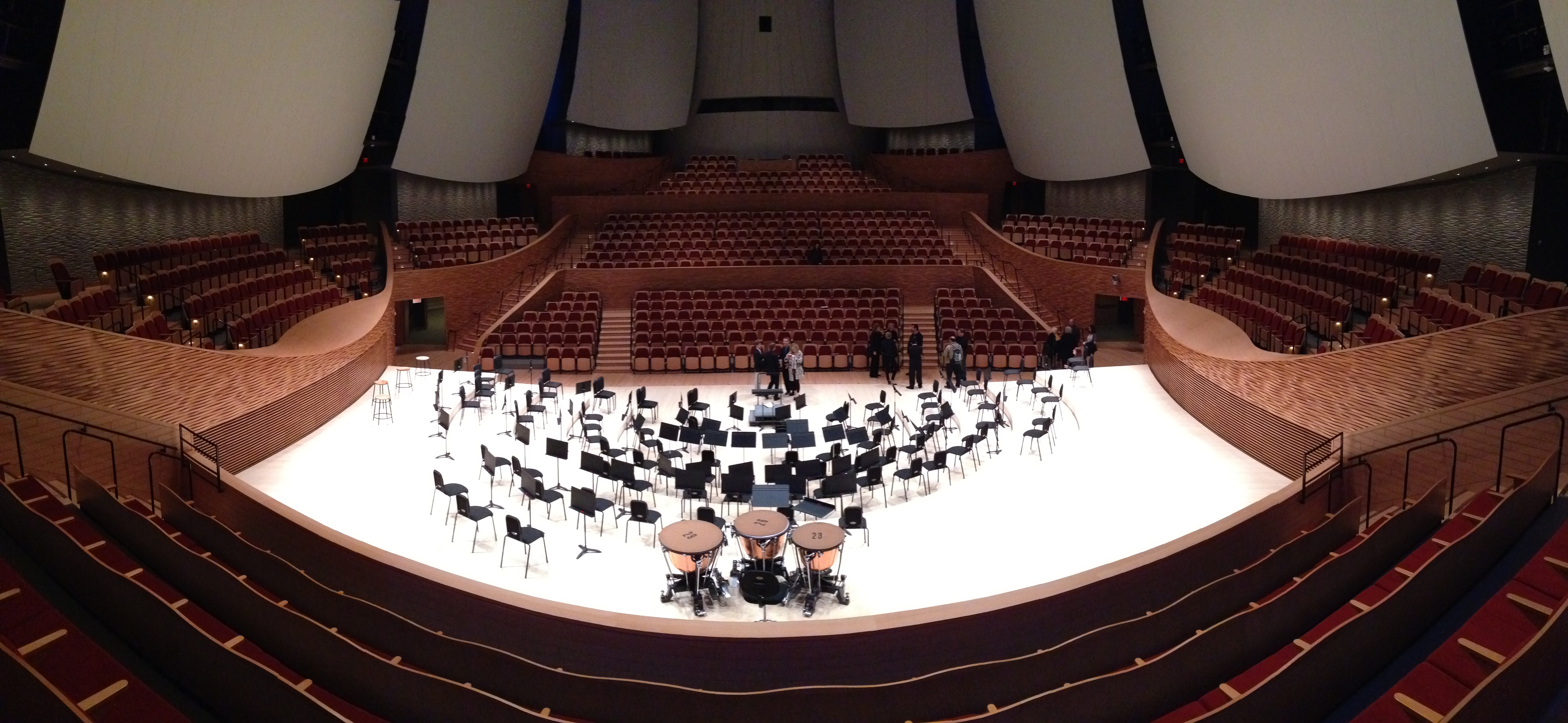
Interior of the Bing Concert Hall from the choral terrace, Fotograf Phil King

The hall is named after the father of Steve Bing, and the son of Leo S. Bing, Peter S. Bing (Stanford 1955) and Helen Bing, notable donors to Stanford who donated the lead gift of $50 million towards its construction Eventual construction cost was $111.9 million.

Bing Concert Hall was designed by Richard Olcott of Ennead Architects, with the acoustics done by Yasuhisa Toyota of Nagata Acoustics, who also worked on Walt Disney Concert Hall in Los Angeles, California and New World Symphony in Miami Beach, Florida.
