= Muza Kawasaki Symphony Hall =

Muza Kawasaki Symphony Hall ミューザ川崎シンフォニーホール
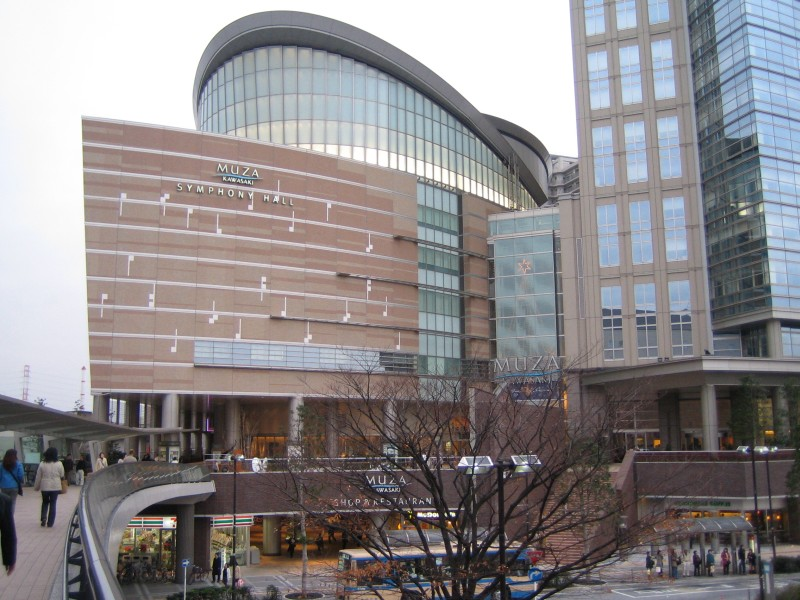
- Interactive map of the Muza Kawasaki Symphony Hall ミューザ川崎シンフォニーホール area

General information
- Location: Kawasaki, Kanagawa, Japan
- Coordinates: 35°31′51.95″N 139°41′40.66″E
- Opened: 2004

Design and construction
- Architects: MHS Planners, Architects & Engineers
- Other designers: Nagata Acoustics

Website
- Hompepage

Muza Kawasaki Symphony Hall (ミューザ川崎シンフォニーホール, Myūza Kawasaki Shinfonī Hōru) is a concert hall in Saiwai-ku, Kawasaki, Kanagawa, Japan. The name is coined from music and za (座) lit. 'seat'. The vineyard-style concert hall, with a capacity of 1,997, was built for the eightieth anniversary of the foundation of the city.

== History ==
The hall opened in July 2004 with a performance of Mahler's Symphony No. 8 by the Tokyo Symphony Orchestra. In that year the orchestra, previously without a permanent home, took up residence. Well known for its acoustics, the hall has seen concerts by Simon Rattle and the Berlin Philharmonic and Riccardo Muti and the Vienna Philharmonic. The bell to announce the imminent start of a concert at the hall is a recording of the bell at Salzburg Cathedral.

At the first time, despite being over 300 kilometres from the epicenter, the hall was greatly damaged in March 2011 Tōhoku earthquake. The ceiling collapsed. Much of the acoustical paneling and related material was destroyed. Ruptures to the automatic fire-sprinkler system caused widespread water damage. As a result, the hall was closed. Performances during much of 2011 were cancelled. Those sufficiently far into the future at the time of the disaster were rescheduled for other Kawasaki and neighboring-city venues, still under the auspices of Muza Kawasaki Symphony Hall. A plan for repair and reconstruction was established. Funds were secured, partly from government sources. A fund-raising concert at the Salzburger Festspiele with Anna Netrebko, Piotr Beczala, and Ivor Bolton conducting the Mozarteum Orchestra Salzburg helped raise additional money. The restored hall is expected to first reopened on 1 April 2013.

At the second time, in early 2020 when the COVID-19 pandemic began in Japan, Muza Kawasaki Symphony Hall was officially temporarily closed and the performances were cancelled. The restored hall is also expected to second reopened on 1 October 2021 as the country ahead of the endemic phase.

== Construction ==
- October 1983 - Kawasaki City makes concept Announcement
- October 1989 - Development begins by the city's public services corporation
- December 2003 - Kawasaki Central Tower is completed
- July 1 and 3, 2004 - Grand Opening performances
- March 2011 - Earthquake, collapse of ceiling, and hall closure
- April 2013 - Expected hall reopening
- March 2020 - Symphony Hall performance cancelled due to COVID-19 pandemic
- October 2021 - Expected hall reopening at second time as the country ahead of the endemic phase

== Facilities ==
- 1997 seats, including 10 wheelchair positions.
- 150 seat assembly hall, practice, study and exhibition rooms.
- Pipe organ & other stage devices designed to support an orchestra

== See also ==
- List of concert halls
