= Vineyard style =

Concert hall design that features sloping terraced seating sections around the stage

The vineyard style is a design of a concert hall where the seating surrounds the stage, rising up in serried rows in the manner of the sloping terraces of a vineyard. It may be contrasted with the shoebox style, which has a rectangular auditorium and a stage at one end (as at the Musikverein). Other possibilities are the fan-shaped (as at the Barbican) and the arena (as at the Royal Albert Hall). The design might be considered a musical theatre in the round.

== History ==
When faced with designing a new home for the Berlin Philharmonic Orchestra to replace Die alte Philharmonie, destroyed by bombing in 1944, architect Hans Scharoun observed that "people always gather in circles when listening to music informally". His design won the ensuing competition, with Herbert von Karajan writing to the judges "of all the designs submitted, one seems to stand out above the others ... founded on the principle that the performers should be in the middle ... the deployment of the walls certainly makes good sense acoustically, but the most impressive of all is the complete concentration of the listener on the musical event".

Following the example of the Berliner Philharmonie, the first example in the New World was the Sala Nezahualcoyotl of 1976 in Mexico City. The style is now found globally. For the Philharmonie de Paris, the vineyard concept is extended with balconies rather than banked terraces.

== Acoustics ==
Echoes occur when there is an audible gap between the direct sound and its reflection. The walls surrounding the stage on which the seats are banked help provide the early reflections of sound from the side that are generally considered favourable. Installation of acoustic reflectors is another way of solving the problem.

== Notable examples ==
Concert hall	Exterior	Opened	Location	Architect	Acoustics	Capacity	Auditorium
Berliner Philharmonie		1963	Berlin, Germany	Hans Scharoun	Lothar Cremer	2,440	
Gewandhaus		1981	Leipzig, Germany	Rudolf Skoda	Wolfgang Fasold	1,900	
Suntory Hall		1986	Tokyo, Japan	Yasui Architects	Nagata Acoustics	2,006	
Sapporo Concert Hall		1997	Sapporo, Japan	Hokkaido Engineering Consultant Company	Nagata Acoustics	2,008	
Walt Disney Concert Hall		2003	Los Angeles, USA	Frank O. Gehry	Nagata Acoustics	2,265	
Muza Kawasaki Symphony Hall		2004	Kawasaki, Japan	MHS Planners, Architects & Engineers Ltd.	Nagata Acoustics	1,997	
Koncerthuset		2006	Copenhagen, Denmark	Jean Nouvel	Nagata Acoustics	1,800	
Shenzhen Concert Hall		2007	Shenzhen, China	Arata Isozaki	Nagata Acoustics	1,680	
Helsinki Music Centre		2011	Helsinki, Finland	Architectural office Laiho-Pulkkinen-Raunio	Nagata Acoustics	1,704	
Philharmonie de Paris		2015	Paris, France	Jean Nouvel	Marshall Day Acoustics	2,400	
Lotte Concert Hall		2016	Seoul, South Korea	Kohn Pedersen Fox	Nagata Acoustics	2,036	Main Hall
Elbphilharmonie		2017	Hamburg, Germany	Herzog & de Meuron	Nagata Acoustics	2,150	
National Kaohsiung Center for the Arts		2018	Kaohsiung, Taiwan	Francine Houben	Albert Yaying Xu	2,000	
Busan Concert Hall		2025	Busan, South Korea			2,011	
