= Ducks Scéno =

Scenography company based in France

Ducks Scéno (Stylized as dUCKS scéno) is a French company based in Villeurbanne specializing in scenography and museography.

== History ==
Ducks Scéno was created in 1991 by Michel Cova as a cooperative with 30 members, 22 of which are partners, who work as scenographers, mechanical engineers, audiovisual engineers, and architects.

== Artistic concepts ==
Michel Cova strives to develop three concepts in particular in its work: asymmetry, natural light, and openness to the surrounding city.

== Projects ==
The company has collaborated with renowned architects such as Jean Nouvel, Rem Koolhaas, and the architecture firm of Herzog & de Meuron.

Large-scale scenographic projects developed by Ducks Scéno include the Philharmonie de Paris, with Jean Nouvel; the Elbphilharmonie, with Swiss architects Herzog & de Meuron; the Casa da Música; the Taipei Performing Art Center with OMA; and the Fondation Louis-Vuitton, with Frank Gehry.

== Notable works ==
Operas and theatres

- 1992: Opéra Nouvel, with Jean Nouvel
- 1997: Bâtiment des Forces motrices in Geneva, with Cattani and Picenni
- 2003: Amphithéâtre d'O in Montpellier, with King Kong
- 2003: Opéra de Lille, with AVA and Atelier P.L. Carlier
- 2006: Guthrie Theater in Minneapolis, with Jean Nouvel
- 2006: Theatre Claude Levi-Strauss in Musée du quai Branly in Paris, with Jean Nouvel
- 2008: The Curve in Leicester, with Rafael Viñoly
- 2011: Théâtre de l'Archipel in Perpignan, with Jean Nouvel and Brigitte Métra
- 2011: Silo in Marseille, with C+T Architecture
- 2013: Cultural Center of West New City, Jinan, with Paul Andreu
- 2018: Oriental Movie Metropolis Grand Theater in Qingdao with Fuksas and IPPR
- 2019: Maison de la Culture of Namur (Belgium) with Samyn & Partners

Concert halls

- 2004: Casa da Música in Porto, with OMA
- 2009: Koncerthuset in Copenhagen, with Jean Nouvel
- 2015: Philharmonie de Paris, with Jean Nouvel
- 2017: Elbe Philharmonic Hall, with Herzog & de Meuron
- 2017: La Seine Musicale of Ile Seguin, with Shigeru Ban

Auditoriums

- 2005: Auditoriums of Museo Nacional Centro de Arte Reina Sofía in Madrid, with Jean Nouvel
- 2005: Auditorium of Torre Agbar in Barcelona, with Jean Nouvel
- 2006: Marseille City Hall, with Franck Hammoutène, laureate of the Prix de l'Équerre d'Argent in 2006
- 2011: Montpellier City Hall, with Jean Nouvel
- 2011: Région Rhône-Alpes Headquarters, with Christian de Portzamparc
- 2014: Fondation Louis-Vuitton, with Frank Gehry
- 2017: Media Library in Caen, with OMA
- 2019: Institut de France in Paris, with Marc Barani

Musical venues

- 1994: Zénith de Lille, with Office for Metropolitan Architecture
- 2004: Maison folie Wazemmes in Lille, with Nox
- 2006: La Commanderie in Dole (Jura), with Brigitte Métra
- 2007: Casino of Toulouse, with Wilmotte
- 2008: Le Fil in Saint Étienne, with XXL
- 2010: Casino de Lille, with Jean-Paul Viguier
- 2010: H106 in Rouen, with King Kong
- 2011: Astrada in Marciac, with King Kong
- 2013: Métaphone in Oignies, with Hérault-Arnod
- 2014: Metronum in Toulouse, with Gouwy Grima Rames
- 2014: The Flow in Lille, with King Kong
- 2015: Belle Électrique in Grenoble, with Hérault-Arnod

Convention centres

- 1993: Congress Center of Tours "Le Vinci", with Jean Nouvel
- 1994: Lille Grand Palais, with Office for Metropolitan Architecture
- 2014: Nancy Congress Center, with Marc Barani
- 2014: Exhibition Center of Agen, with Cardete & Huet
- 2016: Le Carré des Docks in Le Havre, with Paul Andreu and Richez Associés
- 2019: Shenzhen International Convention and Exhibition Center (SZICEC) with Valode & Pistre and Aube Architects
- 2020: Exhibition Centre of Toulouse, with OMA

Movie theatre

- 1998: Institut Lumière in Lyon, with Pierre Colboc

Sports arenas

- 2011: MMArena in Le Mans, with Cardete & Huet
- 2014: Brest Arena, with Hérault-Arnod

Museums and landscape spaces

- 2000: Expo 2000 in Hanover, with Jean Nouvel
- 2000: Parc des Oiseaux in Villars-les-Dombes, with Tectoniques
- 2001: Expo 02 in Morat, with Jean Nouvel
- 2008: TAG Heuer Museum in La Chaux-de-Fonds, with Carbondale
- 2010: Museum of the Prehistory in Lussac-les-Châteaux, with Atelier Beaudoin et Engel
- 2011: Lalique Museum in Wingen-sur-Moder, with Wilmotte
- 2014: Astronomy Center in Vaulx-en-Velin, with S.F. Design
- 2015: Prada Largo Isarco in Milan, with OMA
- 2017:Louvre Abu Dhabi, with Jean Nouvel
- 2018: Danish Architecture Centre in Copenhagen, with OMA
- 2018: Lafayette Anticipations in Paris with OMA
- 2018: Fondation Carmignac in Porquerolles with GMAA and Marc Barani Architects
- 2019: Qatar National Museum with Jean Nouvel
- 2019: MECA (Maison de l’Économie Créative et de la Culture en Aquitaine) in Bordeaux with Bjarke Ingels Group

== Gallery ==
Philharmonie de Paris (Jean Nouvel)

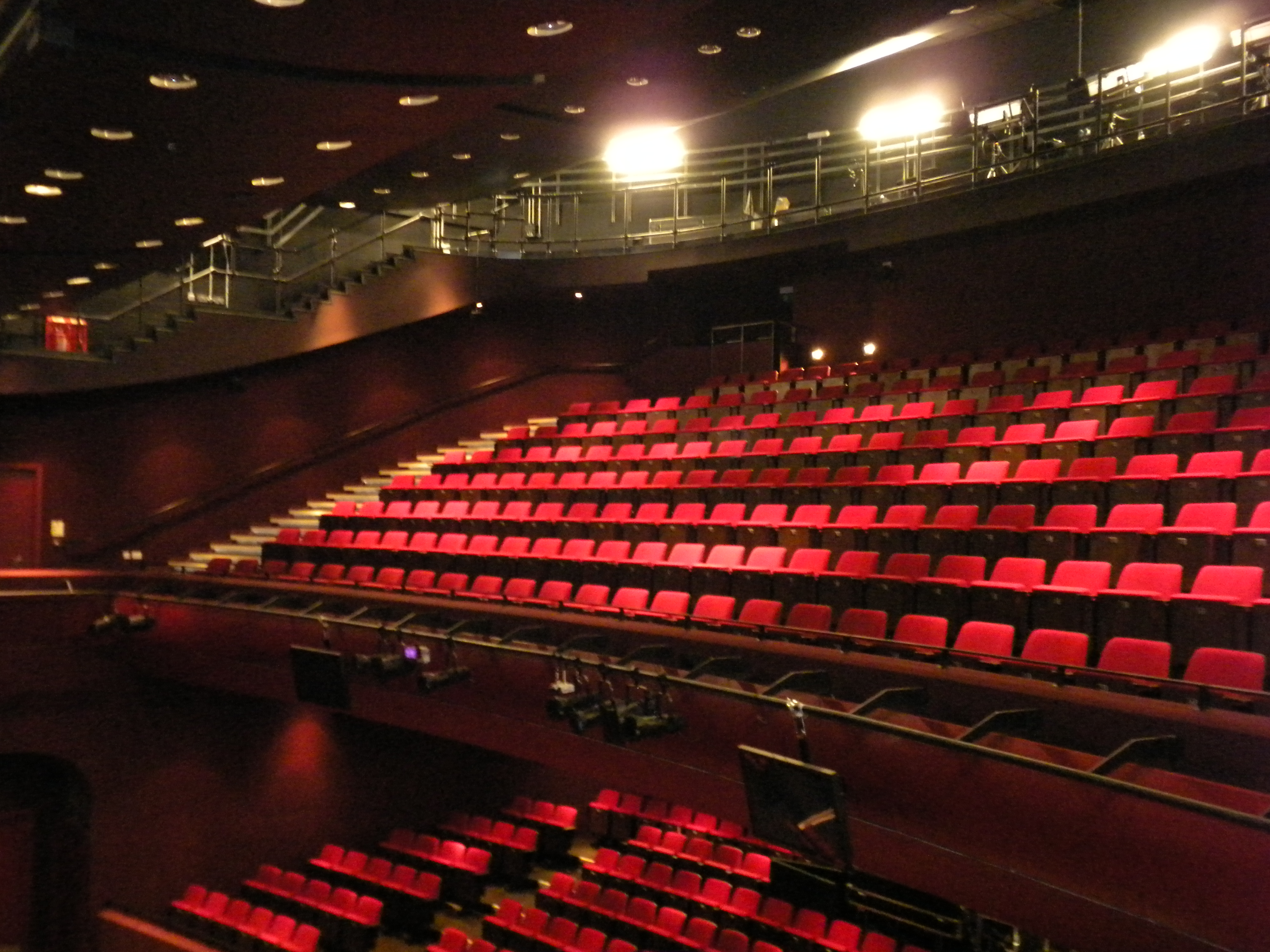
The Curve, Leicester (Rafael Viñoly)

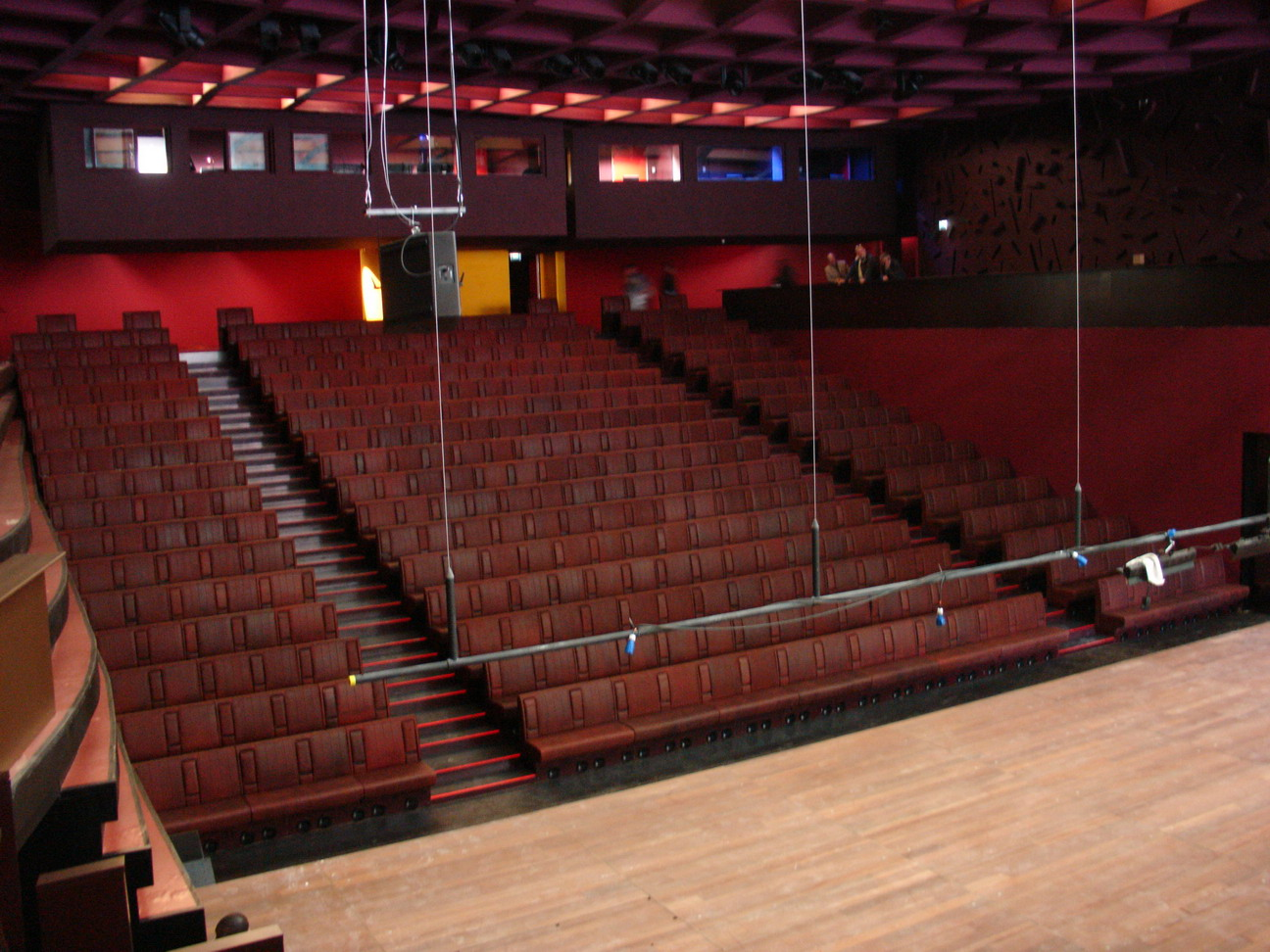
Theatre Claude Levi-Strauss (Jean Nouvel)

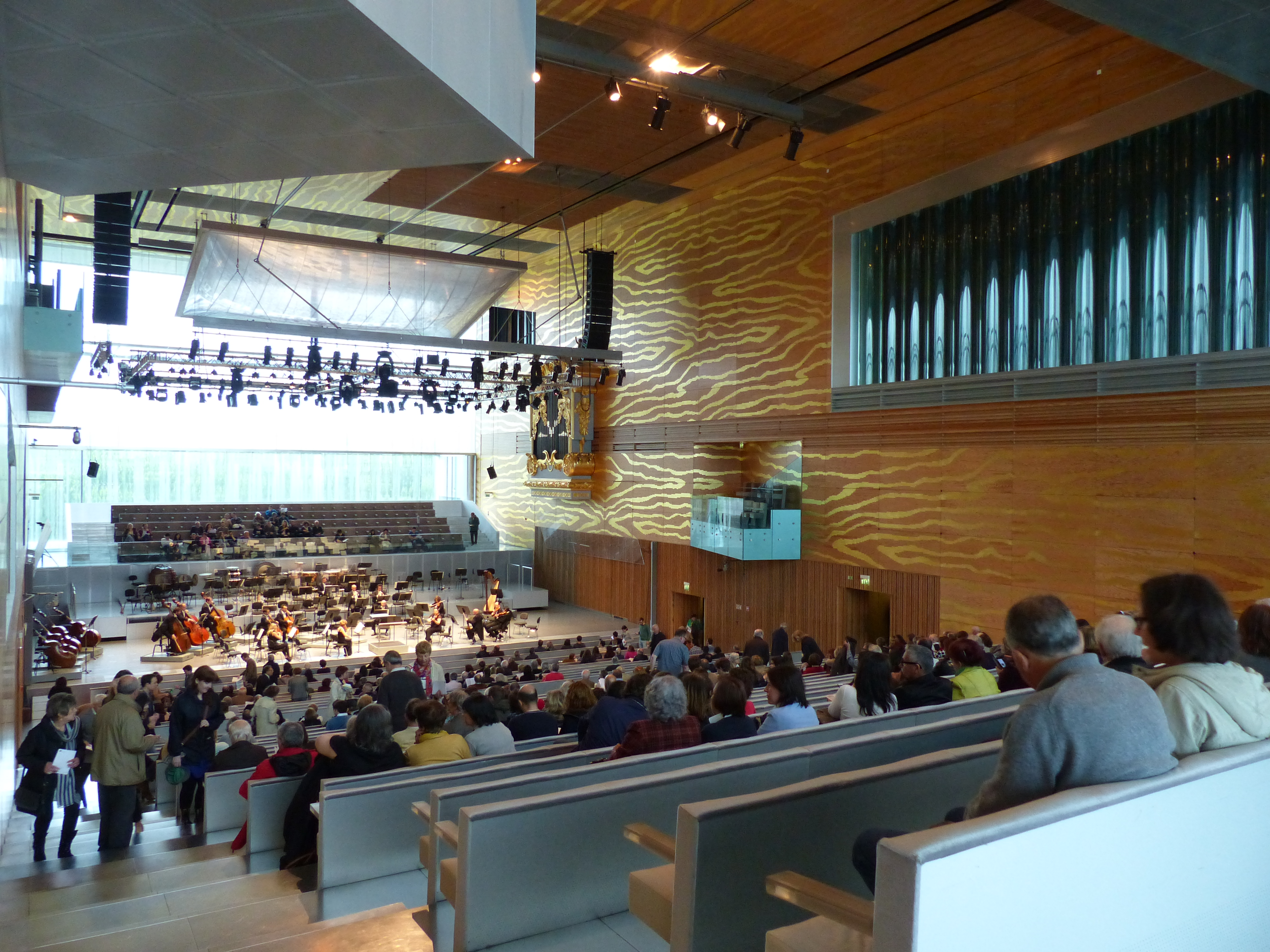
Casa da Musica (OMA)

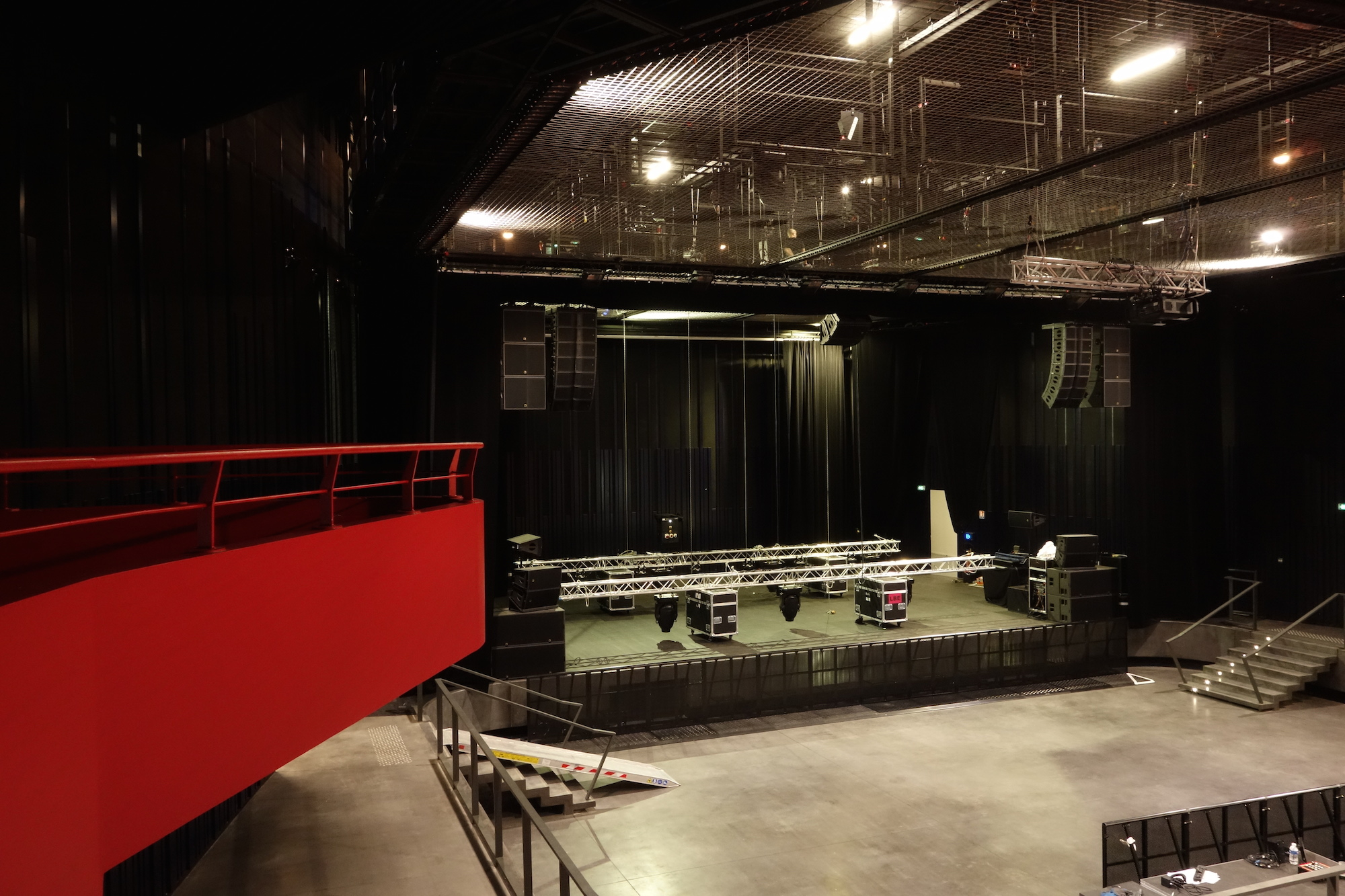
La Belle Électrique (Hérault-Arnod)

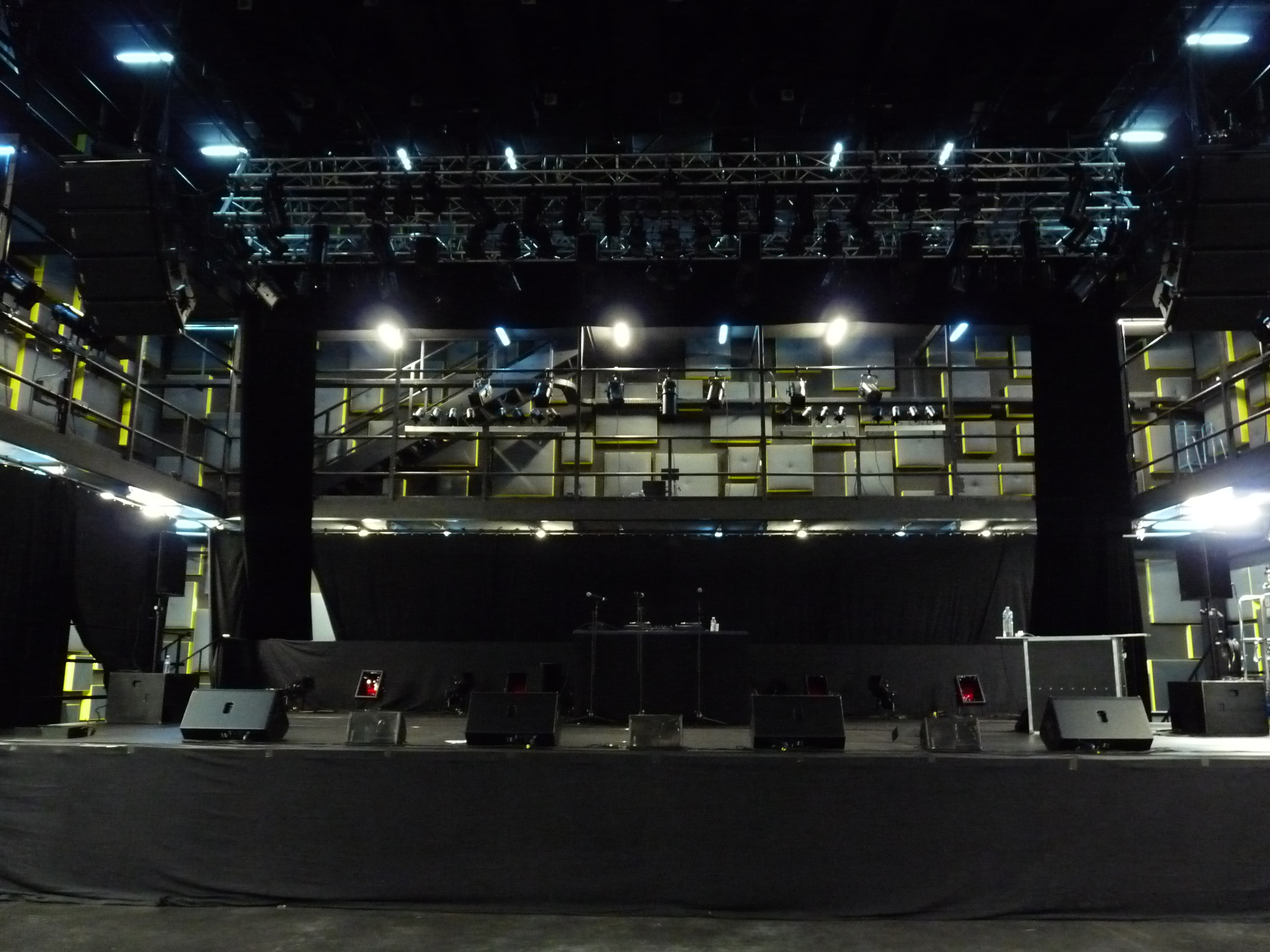
The Flow (King Kong)

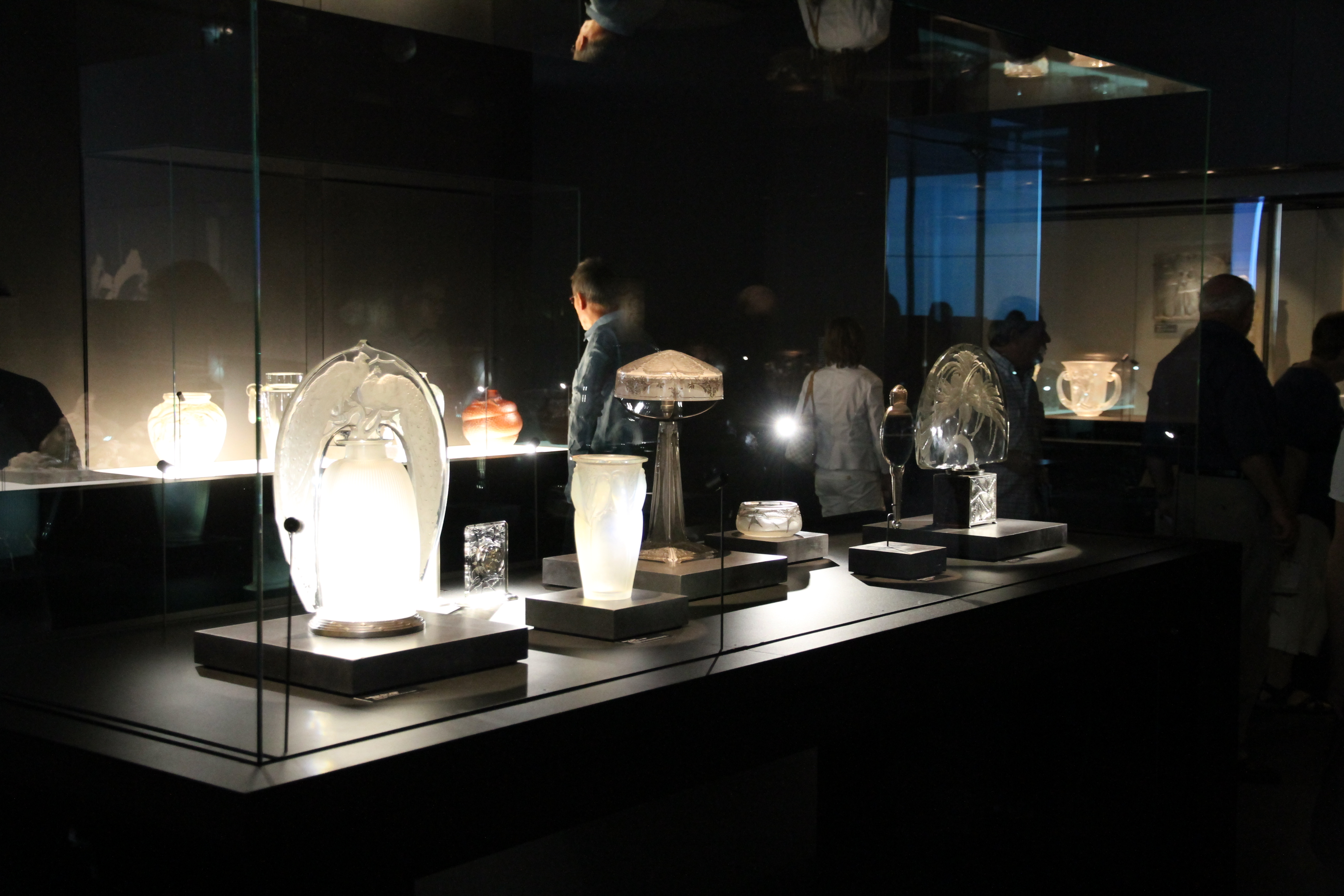
Lalique Museum, Permanent Exhibition (Wilmotte)
