= Suntory Hall =

Concert venue in Tokyo, Japan

Suntory Hall サントリーホール
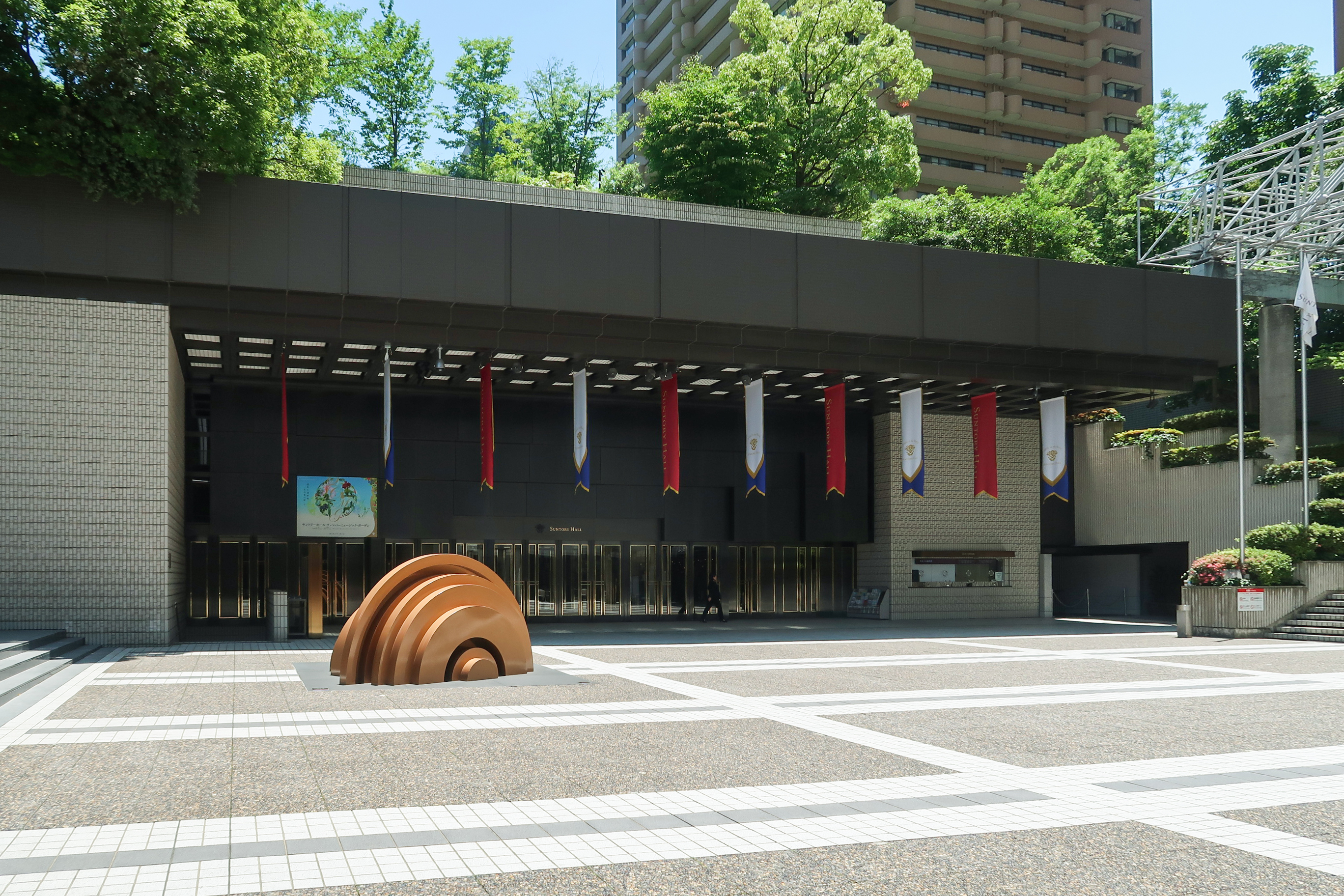
- Interactive map of the Suntory Hall サントリーホール area

General information
- Location: 1-13-1 Akasaka, Minato, Tokyo, Japan
- Coordinates: 35°39′59.9″N 139°44′29″E
- Opened: 1986
- Cost: ¥ 6,000 million
- Owner: Suntory

Technical details
- Floor area: 12,027 m^{2}

Design and construction
- Architect: Yasui Architects
- Other designers: Nagata Acoustics

References
- Factsheet

The Suntory Hall (サントリーホール) is a concert venue in the central Akasaka district of Tokyo, Japan. Part of the Ark Hills complex, it consists of a main concert hall, widely considered one of the finest in the world for its acoustics – Herbert von Karajan called it "a jewel box of sound" – and a smaller side-hall for chamber music. Its roof is an extended, tiered, landscape garden. Construction began in the late 1970s and the facility opened in October 1986.

== History ==
The Suntory Hall opened on 12 October 1986 in commemoration of the sixtieth anniversary of whisky production and twentieth of that of beer by Suntory.

The Herbert von Karajan plaza in front of the Suntory Hall, which was constructed in April 1998, is in remembrance of the maestro, who was involved in the design of the hall and who also recommended its vineyard style as used at the Berliner Philharmonie, in which the audience surrounds the concert floor in the Main Hall. He also helped with its acoustical evaluation. Suntory was designed as a compromise hybrid seating layout, having substantially fewer acoustically-inferior seats sidewards and behind the stage than Berlin Philharmonie, incorporating elements of both the arena layout and vineyard style of the Berlin Philharmonie and classical shoeboxes like Vienna Musikverein. Apparently at the time of construction a visionary modification of the Berlin Philharmonie layout, since recent acoustic research clearly recognizes the advantage of the shoebox halls over Berlin Philharmonie architect Sharoun's unique idea of placing audience all around musicians, even if it meant that many sit in the acoustical offside with weak sound, away from the preferential directions many classical instruments and singers emit sound. Architectural design was by Shoichi Sano, Yasui Architects and that of the acoustics by Minoru Nagata (Nagata Acoustics).

The Suntory Hall has had performers and conductors from all around the world, including Karajan, Leonard Bernstein, Seiji Ozawa, Giuseppe Sinopoli, Claudio Abbado, Wolfgang Sawallisch, Hiroshi Wakasugi, Julian Lloyd Webber, Tsuyoshi Tsutsumi, Ivo Pogorelich, Mitsuko Uchida, and Hermann Prey.

== Performance and other facilities ==
=== Main Hall ===
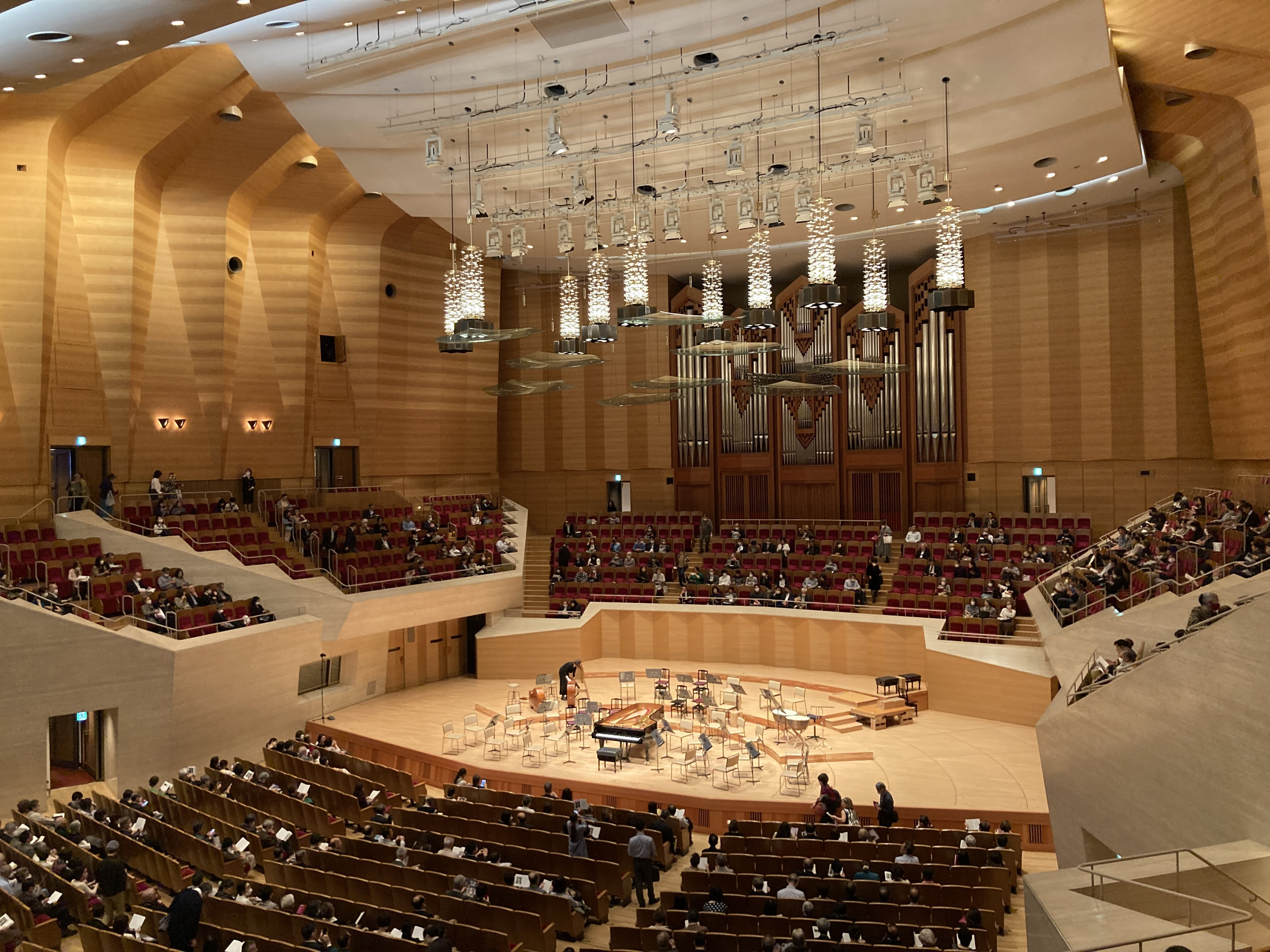
The main hall of Suntory Hall in 2023

The seats in the Main Hall are situated around the concert stage (250 m^{2} in 27 sections), with a capacity of 2,006 people.

Also, the concert pipe organ, with 74 stops and 5,898 pipes, is located in the centre rear of the Hall. It is a large pipe organ, custom built and crafted by Rieger Orgelbau. It has been modified with computerized control mechanisms to allow remote consoles to control it from the stage.

=== Small Hall ===
The seats of the Small Hall (also known as the Blue Rose) can be moved, and the stage consists of three different sections which can be raised by up to 60 centimeters in increments of 20 centimeters. It can seat 384 to 432 people.

The interior 425 m^{2} (25 m x 17 m) consists of wooden paneling. The Hall's main function is for chamber music and solo recitals. Due to its size, (41.6 m^{2}/62.4 m^{2} with 3 platforms), it has also been used for speeches, seminars and lectures.

=== Foyer ===
While waiting for performances and during intermissions, the Foyer provides access to facilities such as the cocktail corner, as well as the "Bar Intermezzo" and "Cafe Intermezzo". Suntory Hall is the first to bring such facilities to Japan. In addition to the box office, there is also a gift shop and cloak room in the foyer.

Artworks in the hall include the Chandelier Symphony of Lights by Motoko Ishii, the stained glass “Growth of Grapes” by Keiko Miura, and wall art by Teppei Ujiyama which are all located in the foyer. Outside the main entrance is a sculpture by Takenobu Igarashi.

== See also ==
- List of concert halls
- Tokyo Bunka Kaikan
- NHK Hall
- Sumida Triphony Hall
