= Philharmonie de Paris =

Concert hall in Paris, France

- The Philharmonie de Paris
- Interactive map of Philharmonie de Paris
- Address: 221 Avenue Jean-Jaurès; 75019 Paris; France
- Coordinates: 48.891566°N 2.39407°E
- Capacity: 2,400 (Grande salle Pierre Boulez)
- Type: Concert hall
- Public transit: Porte de Pantin, Porte de Pantin, Pantin, 75, 151

Construction
- Opened: 14 January 2015
- Architect: Jean Nouvel

Website
- philharmoniedeparis.fr

The Philharmonie de Paris (French pronunciation: [filaʁmoni də paʁi]; English: Paris Philharmonic Hall) is a complex of concert halls in Paris, France. The buildings also house exhibition spaces and rehearsal rooms. The main buildings are all located in the Parc de la Villette at the northeastern edge of Paris in the 19th arrondissement. At the core of this set of spaces is the symphonic concert hall of 2,400 seats designed by Jean Nouvel and opened in January 2015. Its construction had been postponed for about twenty years to complete the current musical institution la Cité de la Musique designed by Christian de Portzamparc and opened in 1995. Mainly dedicated to symphonic concerts, the Philharmonie de Paris also presents other forms of music such as jazz and world music.

== Opening ceremony ==
The hall opened on 14 January 2015, with a performance by the Orchestre de Paris of Faure's Requiem, conducted by Paavo Järvi, played to honour the victims of the Charlie Hebdo shootings which had taken place in the city a week earlier. It is located in the Parc de la Villette in the 19th arrondissement of Paris. This sector of the city was also the home of the two brothers who carried out these killings. The opening concert was attended by French President François Hollande, the President of France but not by Jean Nouvel, because of an ongoing dispute about the final costs and date of the building's completion.

== Philharmonie 1 ==
Philharmonie 1 auditorium.

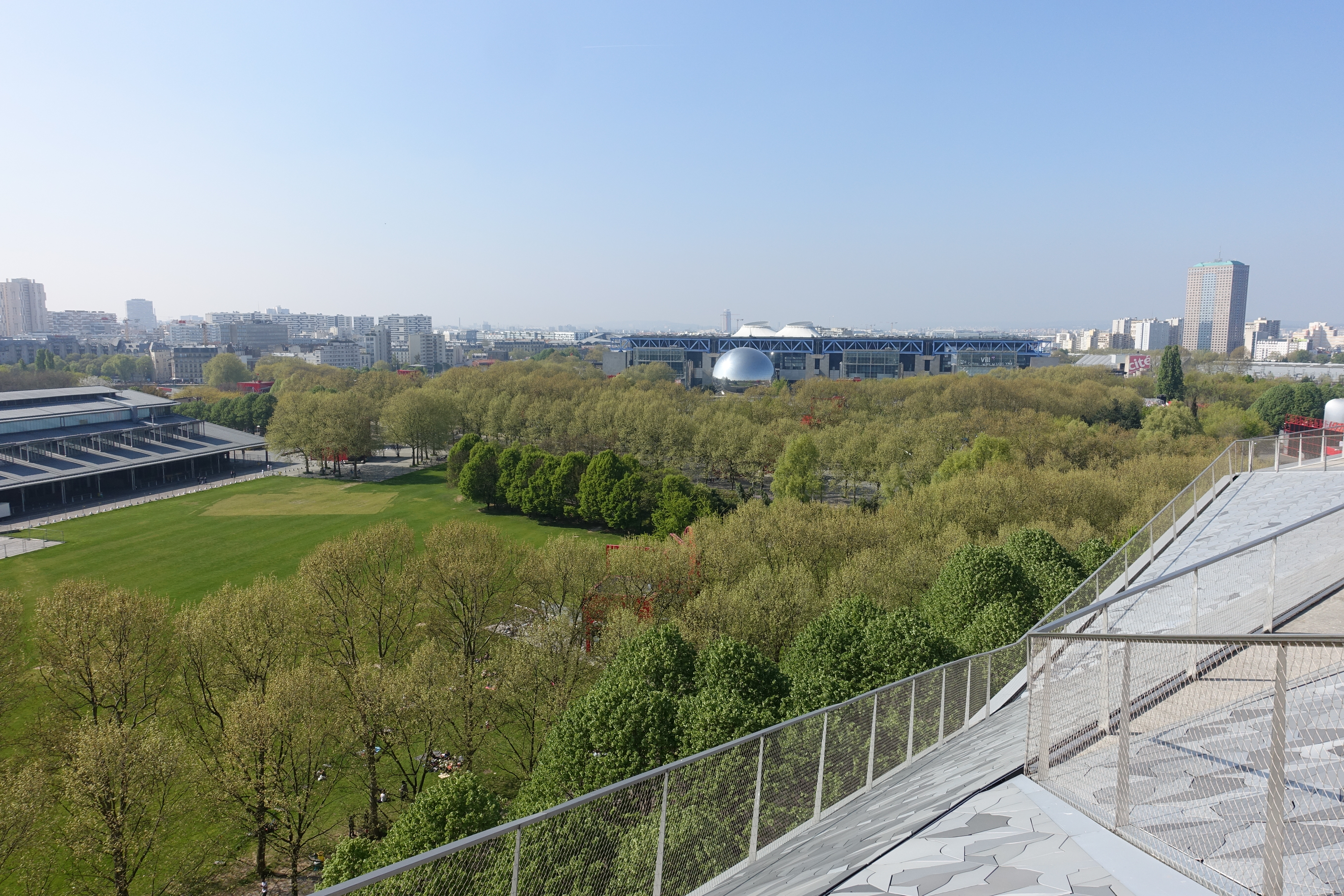
View from the Belvedere on the roof.

Philharmonie 1 (part of the Philharmonie de Paris), a new 2400-seat symphony hall, is a project whose construction had been postponed for about twenty years, to complete the Cité de la Musique.

The beginning of the construction was announced on 6 March 2006 at a press conference concerning the reopening of the Salle Pleyel (now associated with the Museum), by the French Minister of Culture and Communication Renaud Donnedieu de Vabres, the mayor of Paris Bertrand Delanoë, and the director of the Cité de la Musique Laurent Bayle.

The renowned French architect Jean Nouvel won the design competition for the building in April 2007. He brought in Brigitte Métra as his partner, along with Marshall Day Acoustics (room acoustics design) and Nagata Acoustics (peer-review and scale model study) and dUCKS Scéno (scenography).

An initially expected cost of 170 million Euros for the construction was shared by the national government with 45 per cent, the Ville de Paris with 45 per cent, and the Région Île-de-France with 10 per cent; while the final cost was around 386 million Euros ($490 million) and the hall finally opened on 14 January 2015.

From the Belvedere on the roof where the Eiffel Tower can be seen a path snakes downward to the park.

The acoustic and architectural characteristics of the main concert hall have been described as "retaining a real sense of intimacy" which is "achieved by various floating balconies that enable even the farthest spectator to be only 36 yards away from the conductor."

The first season of the Philharmonie de Paris started in January 2015. The purpose of the season was to reach out to new audiences by providing musical creation and a varied repertory in classical music, dance, jazz, world music and contemporary music. On weekends, a diverse program of affordably-priced events and activities was offered each with a theme (such as the Love Stories weekend in February, David Bowie in early March or Paco de Lucia tribute weekend in May).

== Organ ==
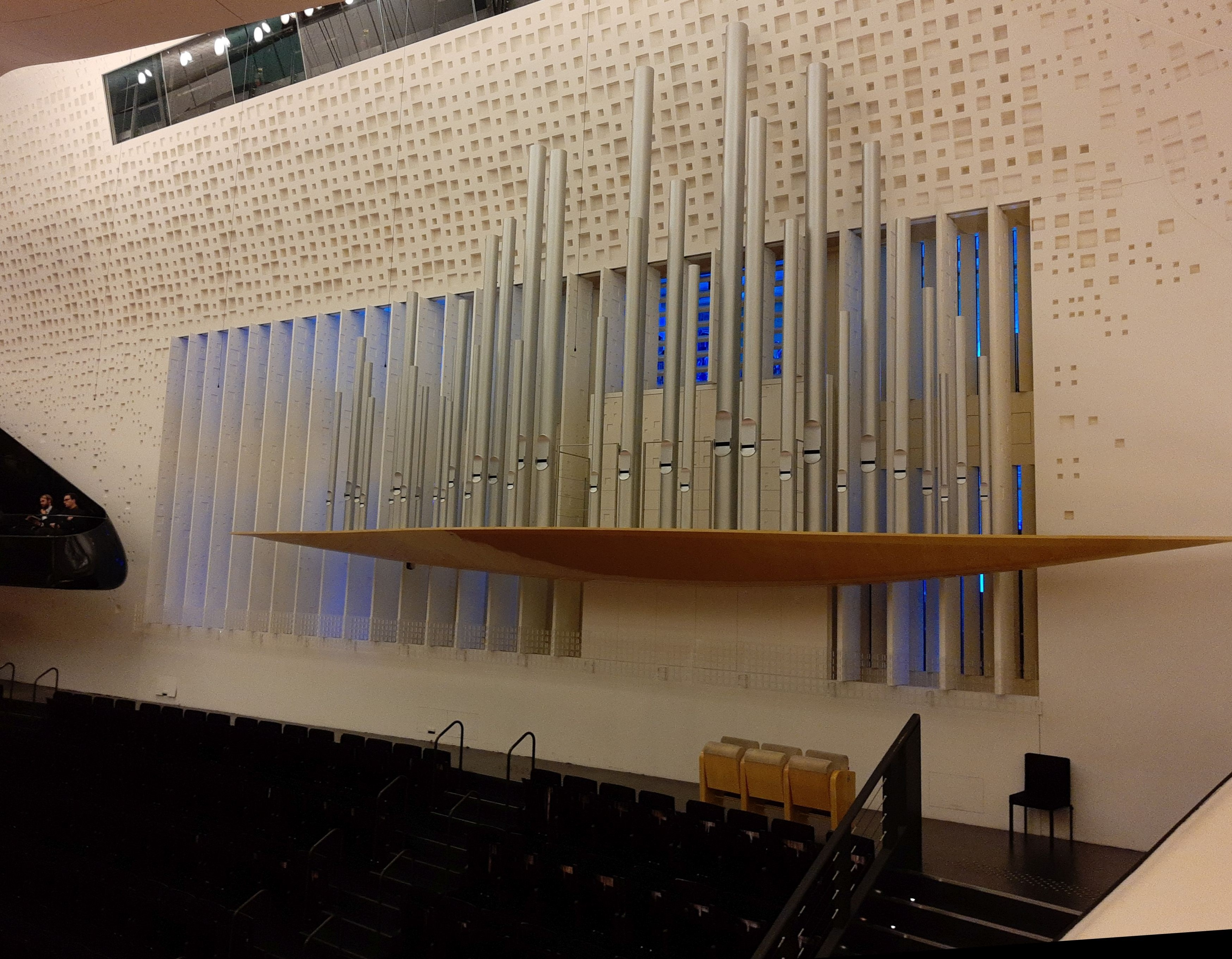
Philharmonie 1 organ.

The Philharmonie de Paris contracted the Austrian organ-maker Rieger Orgelbau to construct a pipe organ. It is made up of 6,055 pipes with 91 stops and was designed to complement the building's architecture. The organ debuted with a concert on 28 October 2015, with an improvisation by Thierry Escaich and a performance of Symphony No. 3 (Saint-Saëns). Another organ of 53 stops on 3 manuals and pedals had already been built in 1991 by the same firm for the nearby Conservatoire de Paris (CNSMDP).

== Philharmonie 2 ==
This used to be called Cité de la Musique and consists of:

- an amphitheatre
- a concert hall seating 800–1,000
- a museum of classical music instruments dating from the 15th to the 20th centuries
- a music library
- exhibition halls
- workshops

In April 2026, the Philharmonie de Paris inaugurated a major temporary exhibition in the Philharmonie 2 complex titled "Video Games & Music: The Music You Are the Hero Of" (Video Games & Music – La musique dont vous êtes le héros), scheduled to run through November 1, 2026. Curated by musicologist Fanny Rebillard and journalist Jean Zeid, the retrospective examines the technical and artistic evolution of video game music (VGM) from its 8-bit origins to contemporary symphonic scoring. The exhibition features approximately twenty interactive installations and playable titles ranging from Pong to League of Legends, alongside scores from series such as Final Fantasy and Assassin's Creed. This program is complemented by a series of symphonic concerts and forums held at the venue between June 23 and 27, 2026.
