= Shoebox style =

Functionalist style of modern architecture

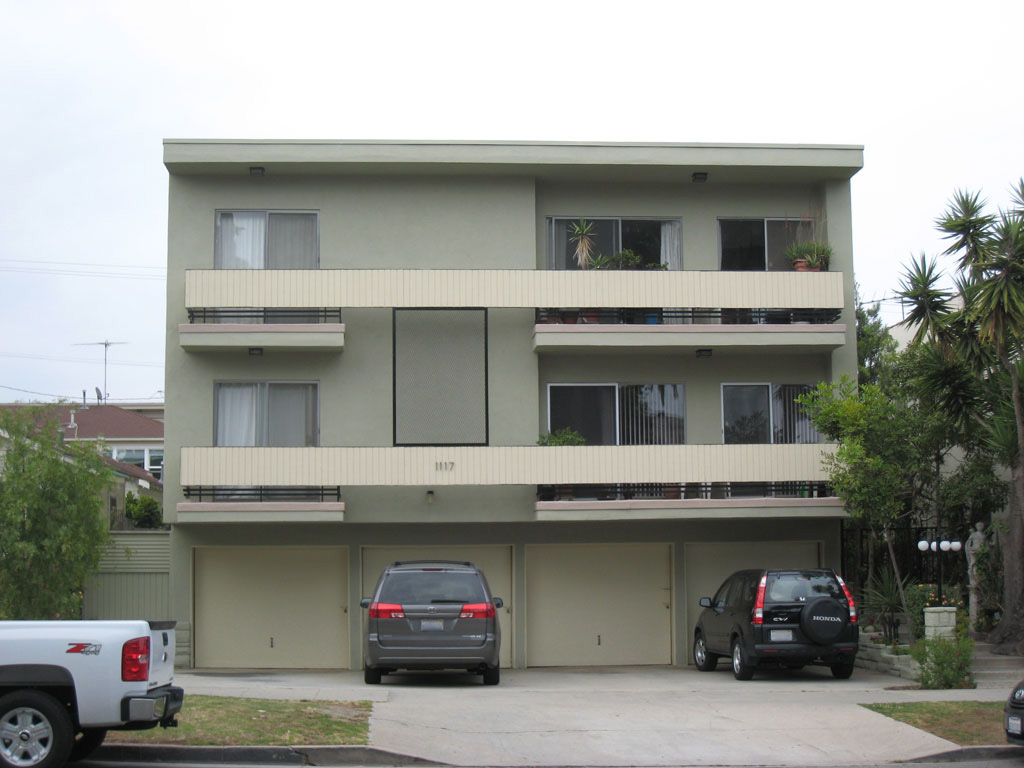
A dingbat apartment building

In architecture, shoebox style is a functionalist style of modern architecture characterised by predominantly rectilinear, orthogonal shapes, with regular horizontal rows of windows or glass walls. Dingbat apartments are an undistinguished shoebox style. The puritan and repetitive shoebox style is seen as a way to low-cost construction.

Shoebox style concert halls of rectangular shape are also popular, as opposed to the traditional circular amphitheatre, arena or horseshoe shapes.

== See also ==
- Vineyard style (architecture)
