= Koncerthuset =

Concert venue in Copenhagen

DR Koncerthuset
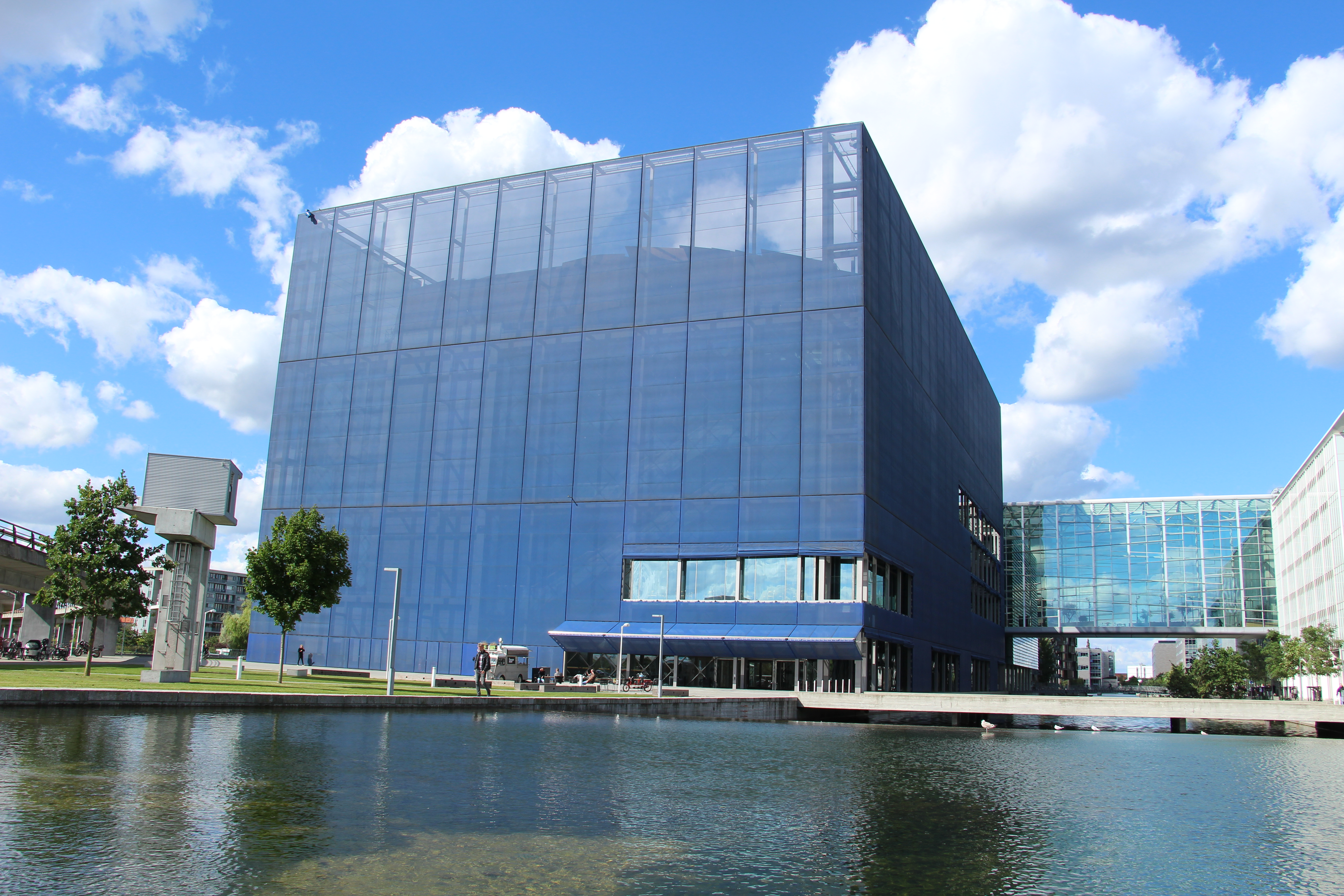
- Koncerthuset in August 2016
- Interactive map of DR Koncerthuset
- Address: Emil Holms Kanal 20, Ørestad North
- Location: Copenhagen, Denmark
- Coordinates: 55°39′29.37″N 12°35′20.75″E
- Owner: DR
- Capacity: 1,800
- Type: Concert hall
- Public transit: DR Byen Station

Construction
- Opened: 17 January 2009
- Architect: Jean Nouvel

Website
- drkoncerthuset.dk

DR Koncerthuset (Danish pronunciation: [ˈte̝ˀˌɛɐ̯ kʰʌnˈsɛɐ̯tˌhuˀsð̩, - kʰɔnˈ-]), previously known in English as Copenhagen Concert Hall, is a concert hall designed by French architect Jean Nouvel. It forms part of the new DR Byen (DR Town) complex, which houses the Danish Broadcasting Corporation (DR) and is located in the northern part of Ørestad – an ambitious development area in Copenhagen, Denmark.

Construction commenced in February 2003. The official opening was celebrated on January 17, 2009, making the total time of construction just a little under 6 years. The concert complex consists of four halls with the main auditorium seating 1,800 people. It is the home of the Danish National Symphony Orchestra.

== Construction ==
The construction, begun in February 2003, was finished in January 2009. The Queen of Denmark inaugurated the venue on 17 January 2009. The project has been a front-page feature in respected El Croquis magazine N.112/113.

With a total surface of 25,000 m^{2}, the concert hall complex designed by Jean Nouvel includes a concert hall with capacity for 1,800 people and three recording studios with variable acoustics. The scenography of the concert hall and the three recording studios was designed with dUCKS scéno. The acoustic studies were realized by Nagata Acoustics. The concert hall contains a pipe organ with 91 voices, 118 ranks, and approx. 6000 pipes, built by Dutch organ builders J. L. van den Heuvel.

The main features of the building are a 4,000 m^{2} cable net façade and 500 m^{2} glass roof, both of which were designed and built by Austrian specialist contractor Waagner Biro.

=== Cost overrun ===
The budget has been expanded several times due to the immense complexity of the project. As of 2007 it had reached almost 300 million dollars making Koncerthuset the most expensive concert hall ever built at the time. The former record holder for cost had been the Walt Disney Concert Hall in Los Angeles at US$274 million. The current record holder is the Elbphilharmonie in Hamburg at US$836 million. The Danish government has refused to grant extra funds for the buildings so, the budget expansion has meant drastic cutbacks in DR staff and funding.

== Architect ==
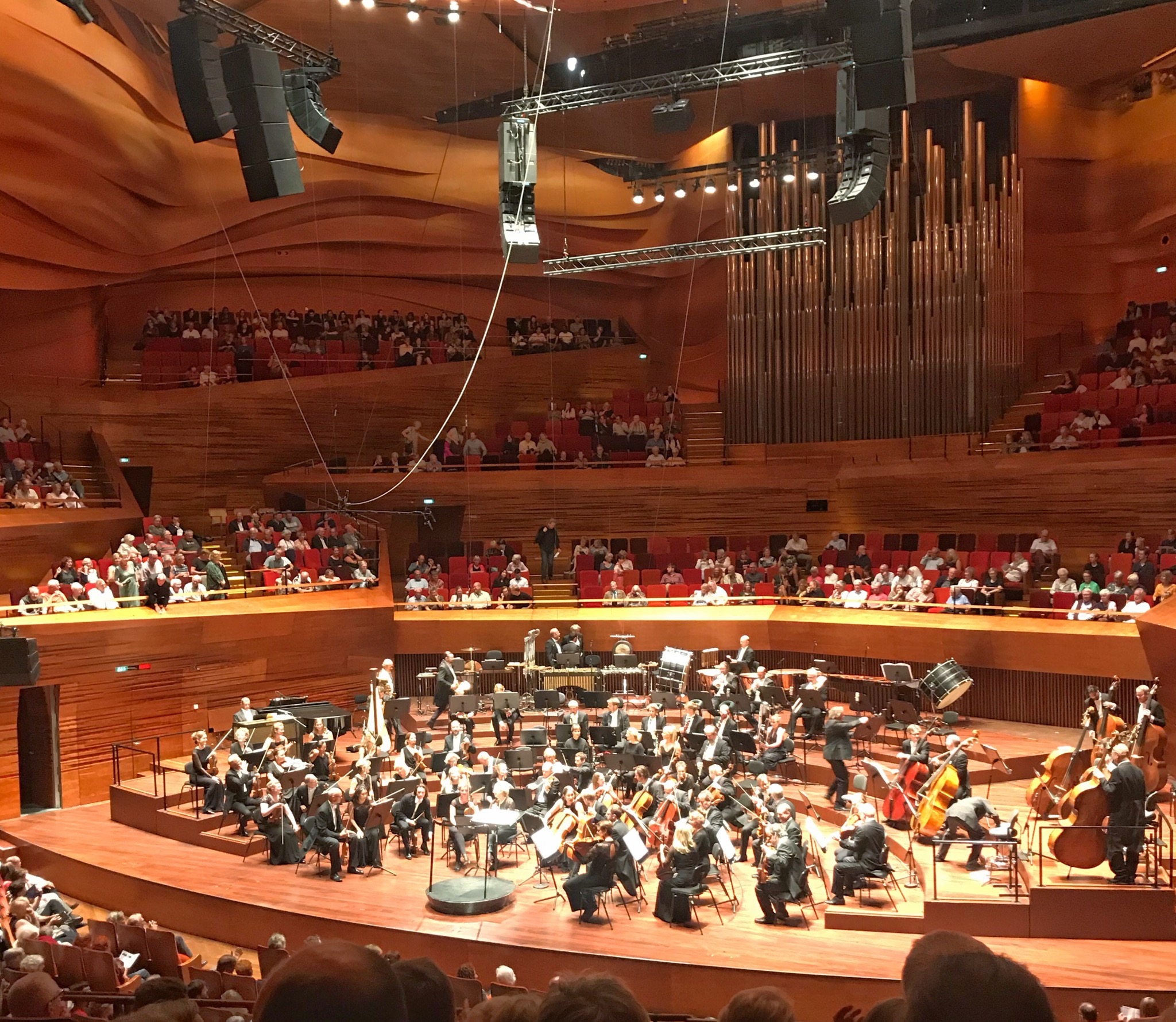
Interior of DR Koncerthuset in Copenhagen 2019 with DR Symfoniorkester

Pritzker Prize winner Jean Nouvel is the architect of the project. The structure can be likened to a meteor covered by big blue screens, supposed to resemble water, that can be used to project visual content on. Nouvel says on the project :

"Building in emerging neighborhoods is a risk that has often proved fatal in recent years. When there is no built environment upon which to found our work, when we cannot evaluate a neighborhood's future potential, we have to turn the question around: what qualities can we bring to this future? We can respond positively to an uncertainty by using its most positive attribute, that is, mystery. Mystery is never far from seduction. When the surroundings are too neutral we must create a transition, a distance between them, and us, not as a retreat into ourselves, but as a means to establish conditions that will allow a particular territory to blossom. In other words we need to bring value to the context, whatever it may be. For this we must establish a presence, an identity. I propose to materialize the context by creating an exceptional urban building respecting the planned layout of the site. It will be a volume, a mysterious parallelepiped that changes under the light of day and night whose interior can only be guessed at. At night the volume will come alive with images, colors, and lights expressing the life going on inside".

"The interior is a world in itself, complex and diversified. An interior street lined with shops follows the path of the urban canal; a restaurant and bar spill into it. The restaurant is dominated by a covered square, a large empty volume beneath the wooden "scales" cladding the concert hall above. It is a world of contrasts and surprises, a labyrinth, an interior landscape. On one side, the world of musicians, with courtyards and exterior terraces, and vegetation. On the other, Piranesian public spaces link together the different performance halls, the restaurant, and the street. The abstract is invaded by the figurative; the permanent is complemented by the ephemeral. The facades are diaphanous filters permitting views of the city, the canal, and the neighboring architecture. At night these facades become screens for projecting images. The architecture asserts itself through details - doors, lighting, ceilings, and staircases - a testimony of respect for the buildings' visitors, concertgoers, and artists. Each room becomes a discovery, each detail an invention, lessons learned from Theodor Lauritzen and Hans Sharoun whose certain kind of architecture should never be forgotten, and to whom this project is a discrete homage. Architecture is like music; it is made to move and delight us".

Jean Nouvel

== Awards ==
- Best new public house, 2010 Wallpaper Design Award

== Gallery ==
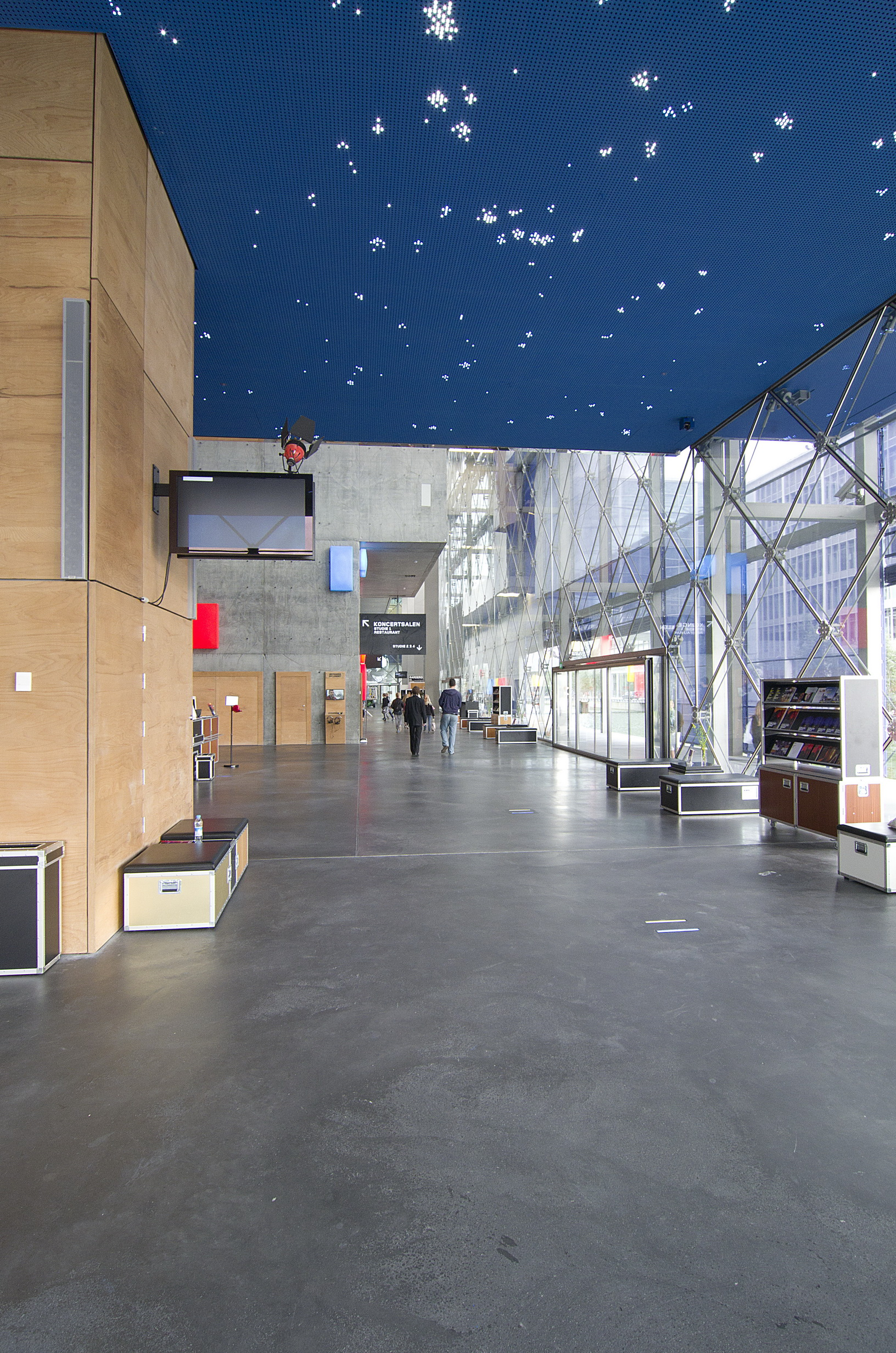
Foyer area (2011)

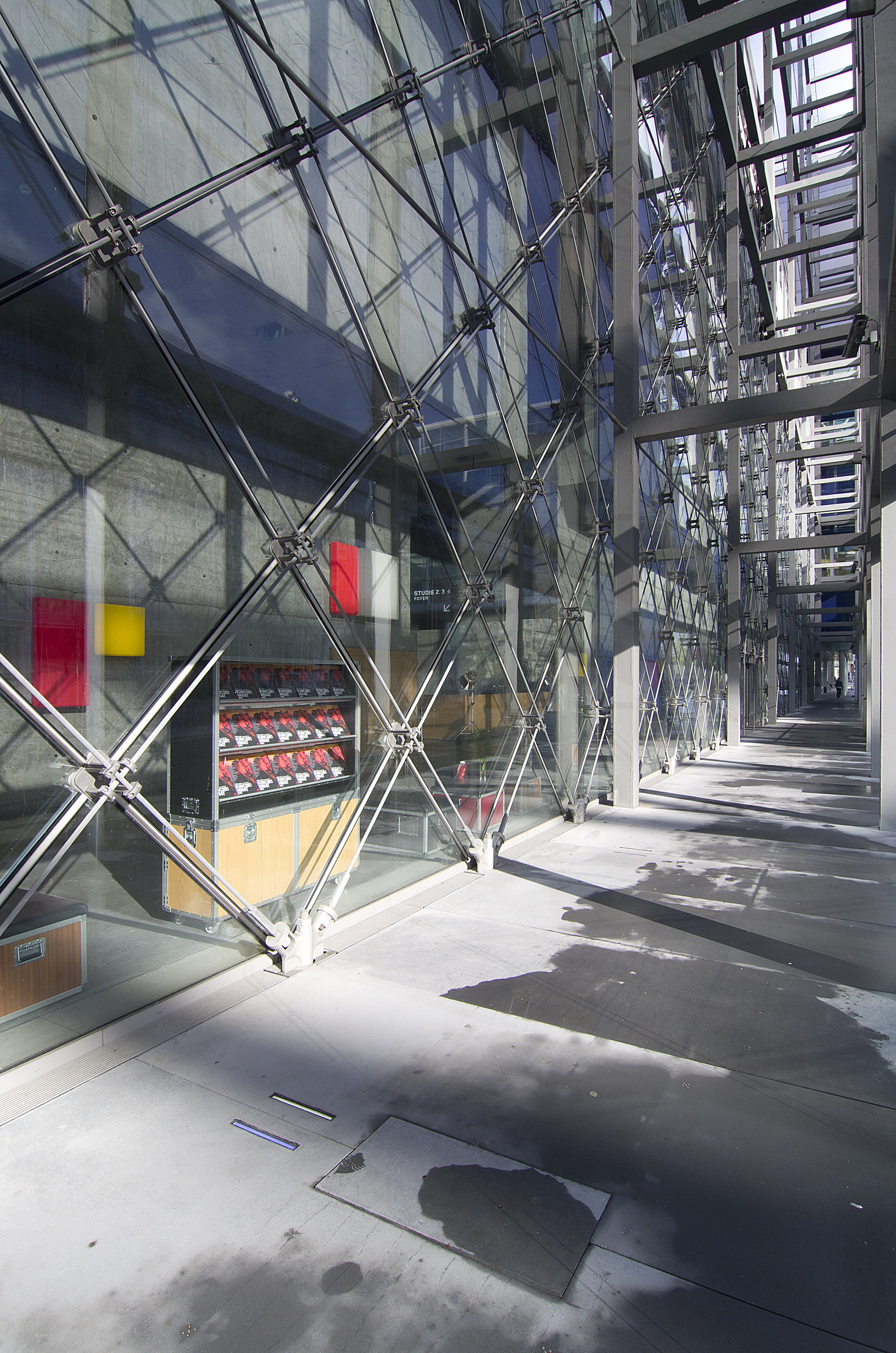
Exterior structure (2011)

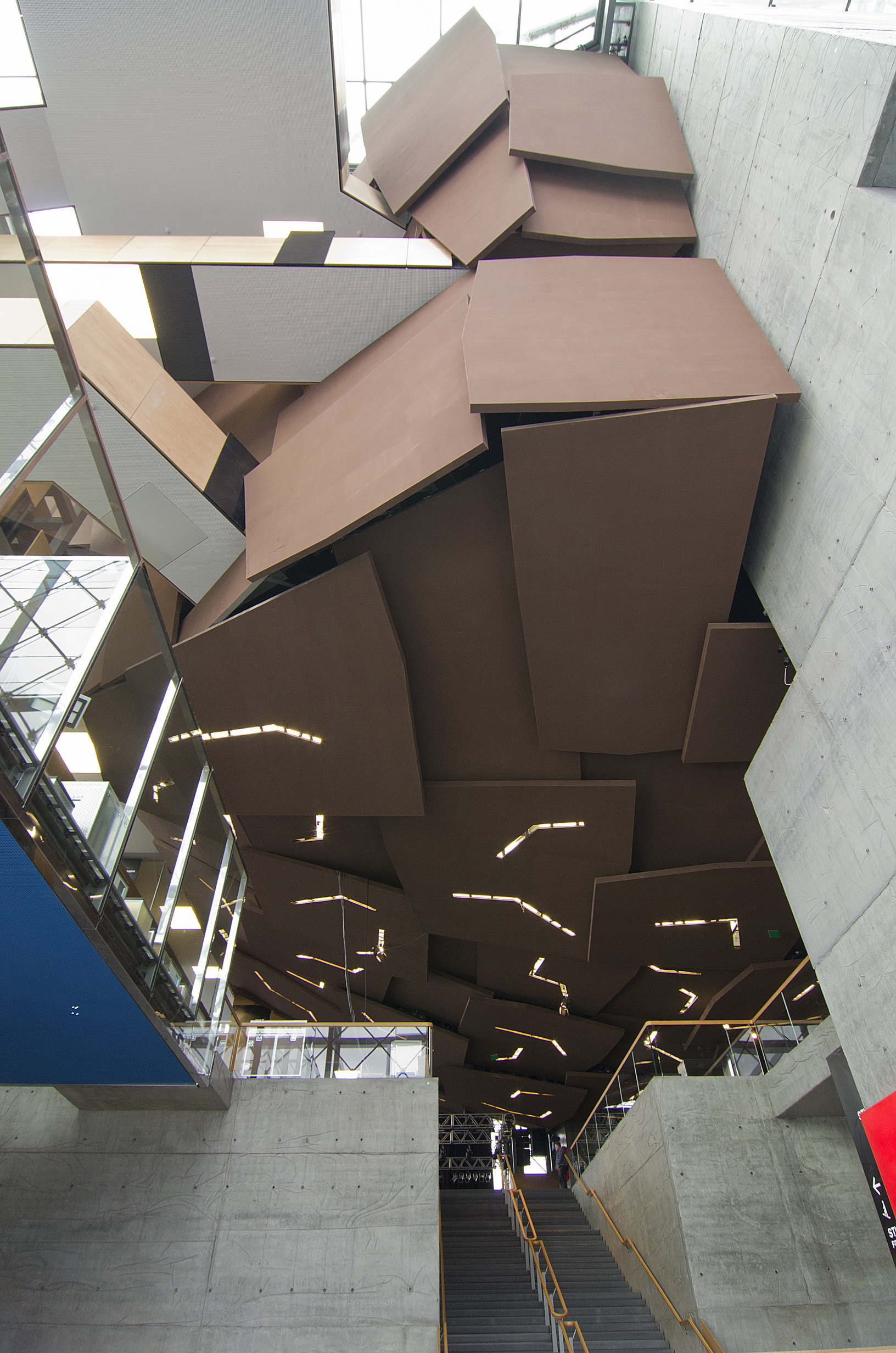
(2011)

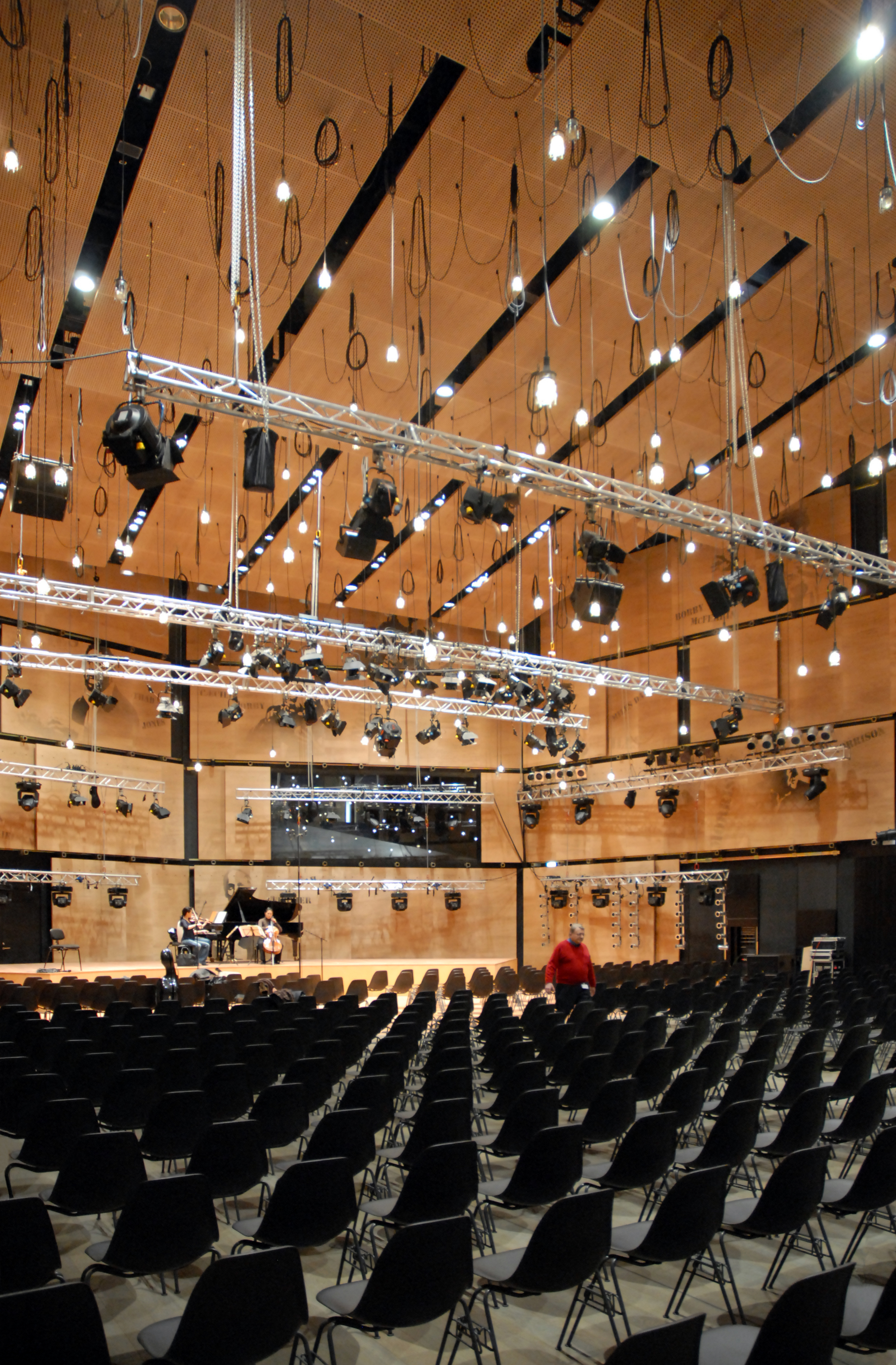
Studio 2 (2009)

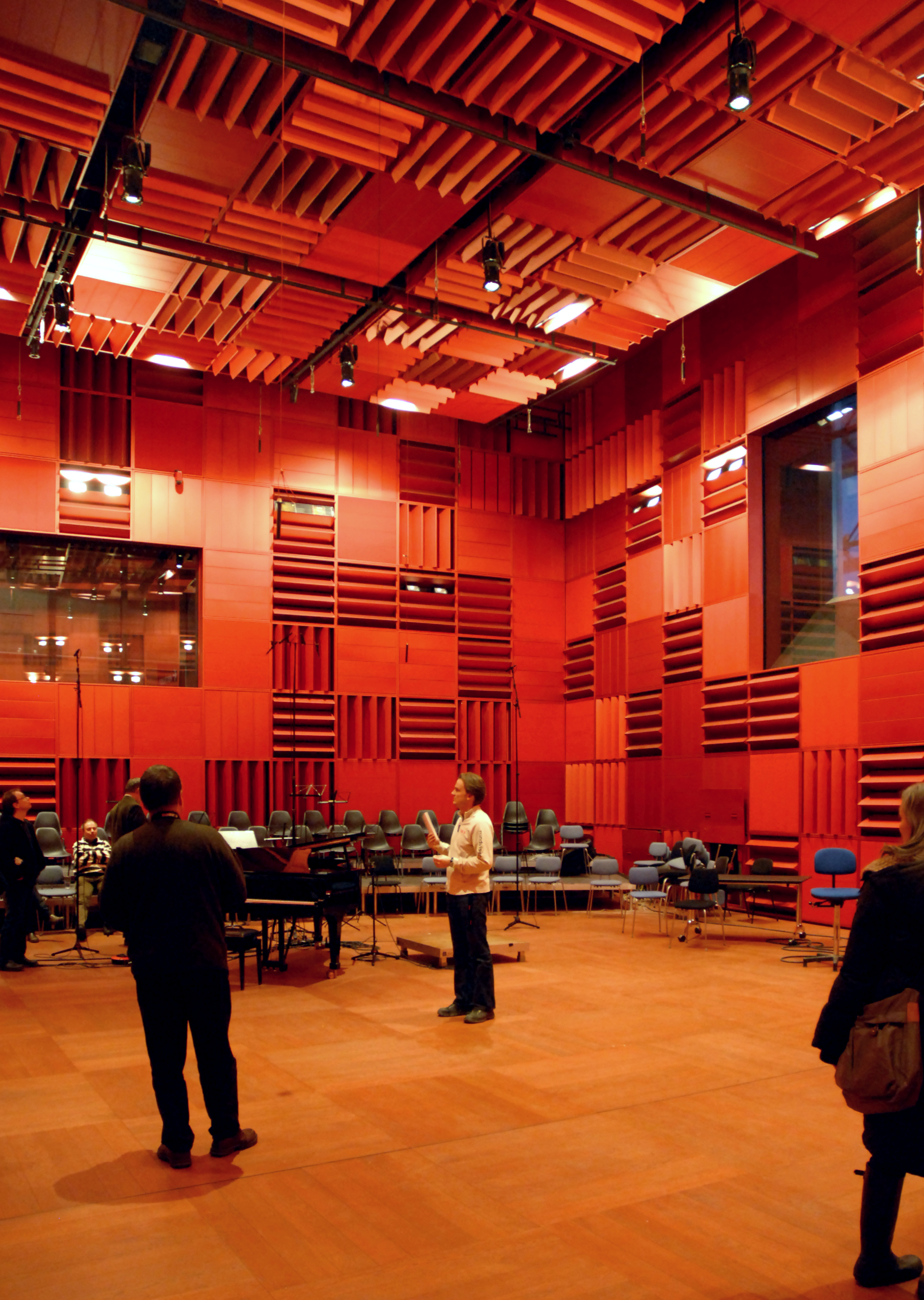
Studio 3 (2009)

== See also ==
- List of concert halls in Denmark
