= Nagata Acoustics =

Nagata Acoustics 永田音響設計
- Founded: July 1, 1971
- Founder: Minoru Nagata
- Headquarters: Bunkyō, Tokyo, Japan
- Area served: Worldwide (with offices in Tokyo, Paris, Los Angeles)
- Services: Acoustical consultancy
- Website: www.nagata.co.jp/e_index.html

Nagata Acoustics (永田音響設計, Nagata onkyō sekkei) is an international acoustical consultancy firm. In Japan they have been involved in the design of over seventy concert halls, including the Suntory Hall, Sapporo Concert Hall, Muza Kawasaki Symphony Hall, Kyoto Concert Hall and Hyogo Performing Arts Center; other projects have included the Supreme Court, Tokyo and the sound system for the New National Theatre, Tokyo. Outside Japan they have consulted on the Walt Disney Concert Hall, Polish National Radio Symphony Orchestra in Katowice, the Danish Radio Concert Hall, Helsinki Music Centre, Mariinsky Concert Hall and Opera House, Elbphilharmonie, Taichung Metropolitan Opera House, Bing Concert Hall, and Philharmonie de Paris.

== See also ==
- Acoustical engineering
- Yasuhisa Toyota
- Vineyard style (architecture)
