= Acoustical engineering =

Branch of engineering dealing with sound and vibration

Acoustical engineering (also known as acoustic engineering) is the branch of engineering dealing with sound and vibration. It includes the application of acoustics, the science of sound and vibration, in technology. Acoustical engineers are typically concerned with the design, analysis and control of sound.

One goal of acoustical engineering can be the reduction of unwanted noise, which is referred to as noise control. Unwanted noise can have significant impacts on animal and human health and well-being, reduce attainment by students in schools, and cause hearing loss. Noise control principles are implemented into technology and design in a variety of ways, including control by redesigning sound sources, the design of noise barriers, sound absorbers, suppressors, and buffer zones, and the use of hearing protection (earmuffs or earplugs).

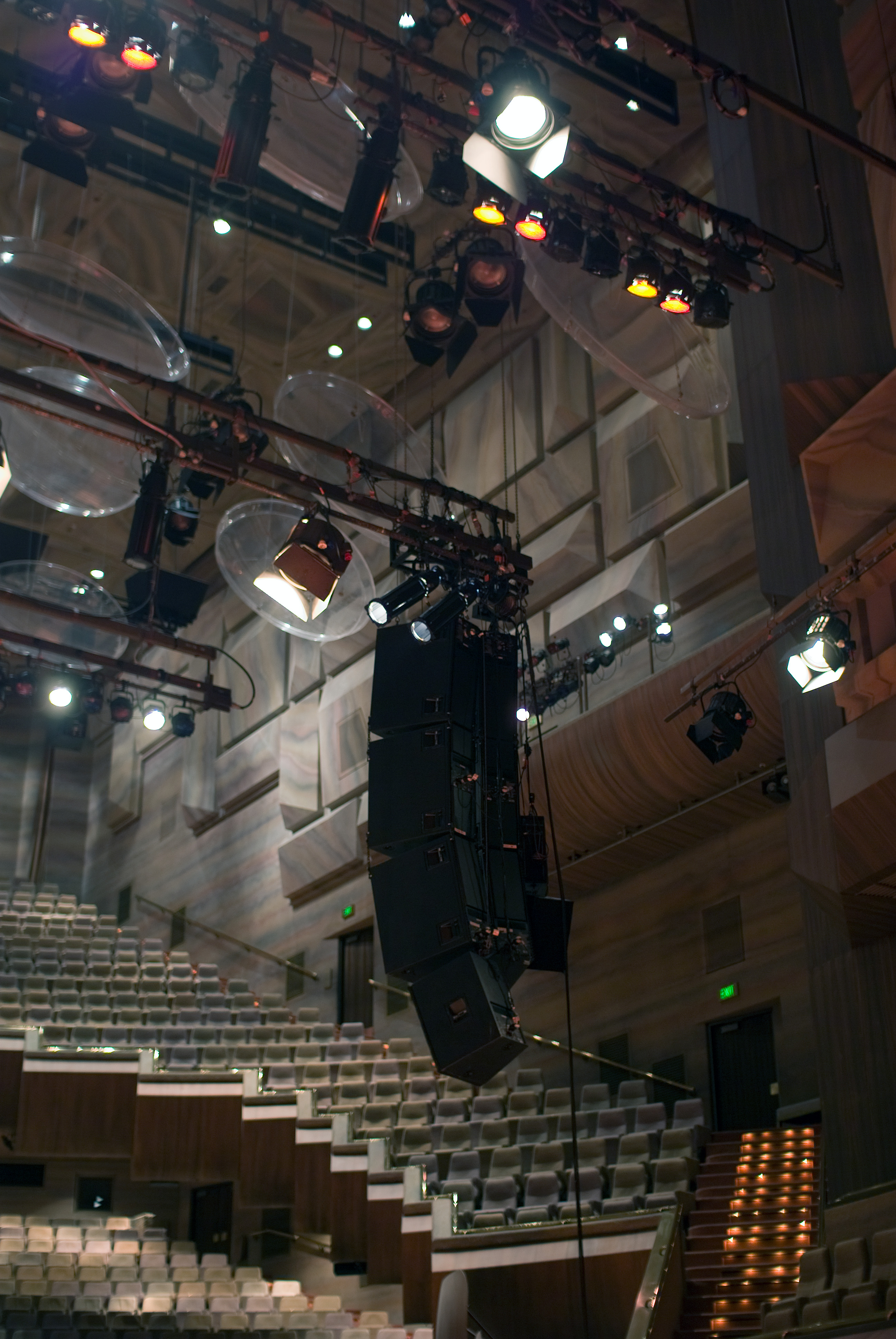
The transparent baffles inside this auditorium were installed to optimise sound projection and reproduction, key factors in acoustical engineering.

Besides noise control, acoustical engineering also covers positive uses of sound, such as the use of ultrasound in medicine, programming digital synthesizers, designing concert halls to enhance the sound of orchestras and specifying railway station sound systems so that announcements are intelligible.

== Acoustic engineer (professional) ==
Acoustic engineers usually possess a bachelor's degree or higher qualification in acoustics, physics or another engineering discipline. Practicing as an acoustic engineer usually requires a bachelor's degree with significant scientific and mathematical content. Acoustic engineers might work in acoustic consultancy, specializing in particular fields, such as architectural acoustics, environmental noise or vibration control. In other industries, acoustic engineers might: design automobile sound systems; investigate human response to sounds, such as urban soundscapes and domestic appliances; develop audio signal processing software for mixing desks, and design loudspeakers and microphones for mobile phones. Acousticians are also involved in researching and understanding sound scientifically. Some positions, such as faculty require a Doctor of Philosophy.

In most countries, a degree in acoustics can represent the first step towards professional certification and the degree program may be certified by a professional body. After completing a certified degree program the engineer must satisfy a range of requirements before being certified. Once certified, the engineer is designated the title of Chartered Engineer (in most Commonwealth countries).

== Subdisciplines ==
The listed subdisciplines are loosely based on the PACS (Physics and Astronomy Classification Scheme) coding used by the Acoustical Society of America.

=== Aeroacoustics ===
Aeroacoustics is concerned with how noise is generated by the movement of air, for instance via turbulence, and how sound propagates through the fluid air. Aeroacoustics plays an important role in understanding how noise is generated by aircraft and wind turbines, as well as exploring how wind instruments work.

=== Audio signal processing ===
Audio signal processing is the electronic manipulation of audio signals using analog and digital signal processing. It is done for a variety of reasons, including:

- to enhance a sound, e.g. by applying an audio effect such as reverberation;
- to remove unwanted noises from a signal, e.g. echo cancellation in internet voice calls;
- to compress an audio signal to allow efficient transmission, e.g. perceptual coding in MP3 and Opus
- to understand the content of the signal, e.g. identification of music tracks via music information retrieval.

Audio engineers develop and use audio signal processing algorithms.

=== Architectural acoustics ===
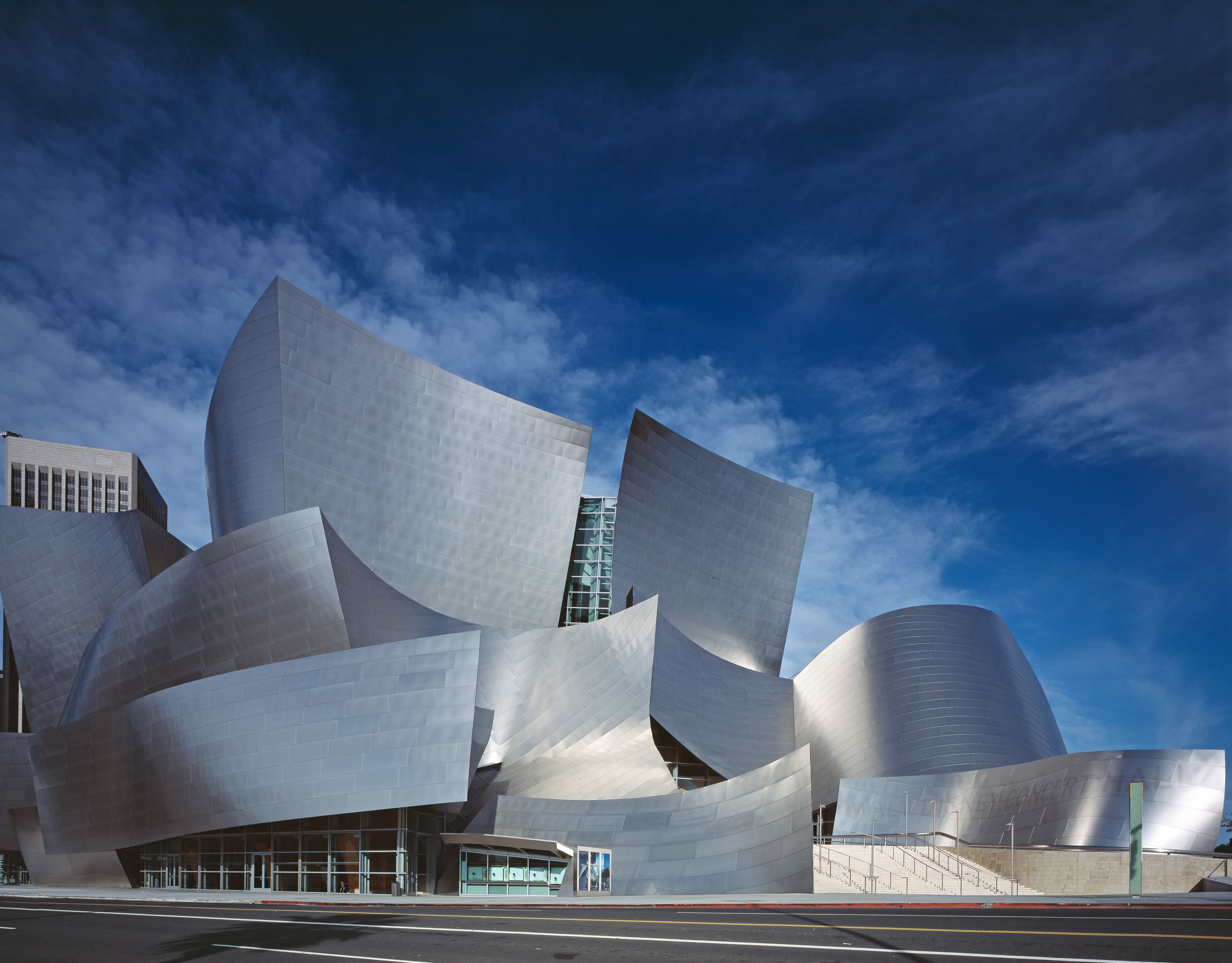
Disney's Concert Hall was meticulously designed for superior acoustical qualities.

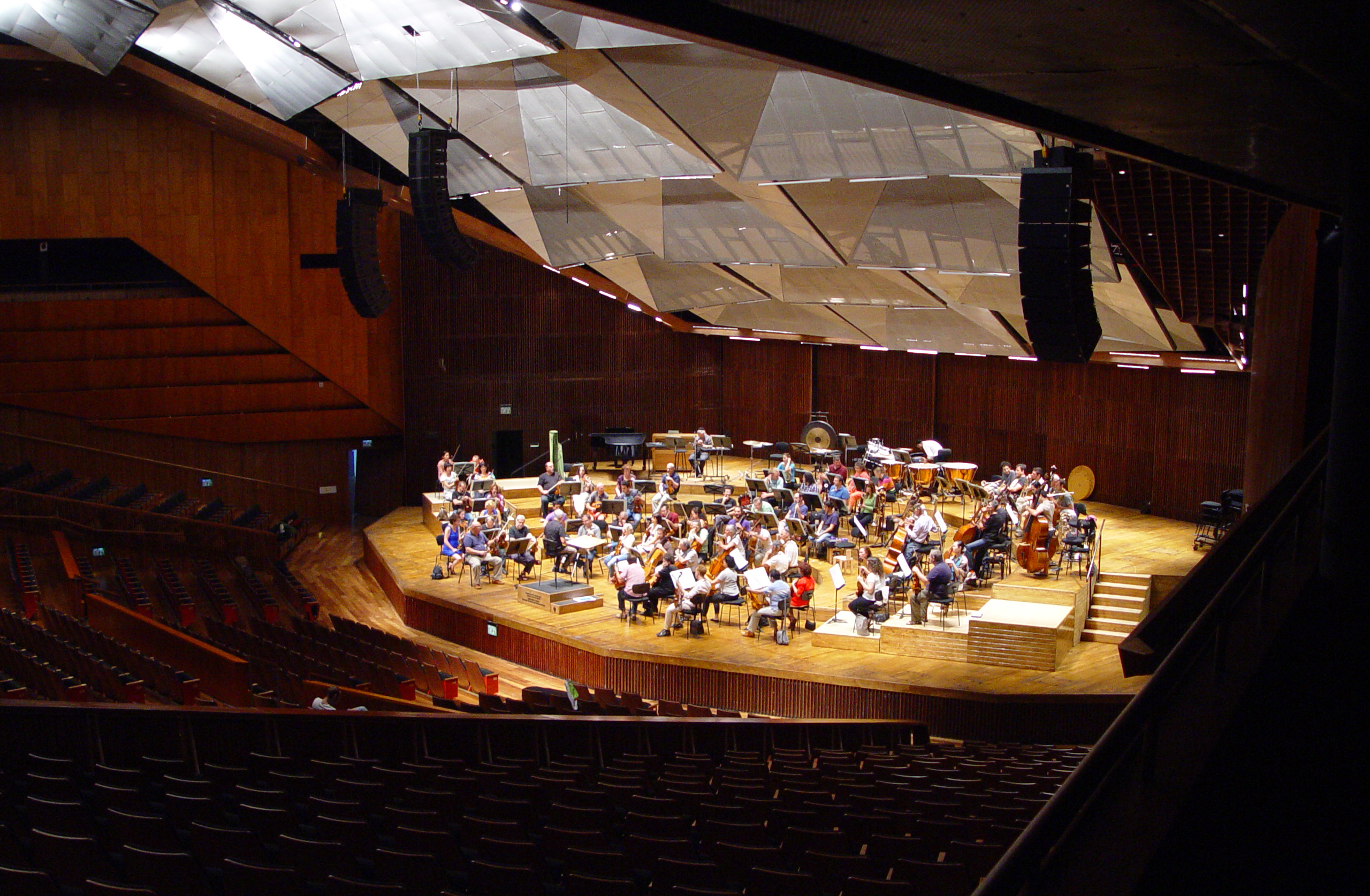
Ceiling of Culture Palace (Tel Aviv) concert hall is covered with perforated metal panels

Architectural acoustics (also known as building acoustics) is the science and engineering of achieving a good sound within a building. Architectural acoustics can be about achieving good speech intelligibility in a theatre, restaurant or railway station, enhancing the quality of music in a concert hall or recording studio, or suppressing noise to make offices and homes more productive and pleasant places to work and live. Architectural acoustic design is usually done by acoustic consultants.

=== Bioacoustics ===
Bioacoustics concerns the scientific study of sound production and hearing in animals. It can include: acoustic communication and associated animal behavior and evolution of species; how sound is produced by animals; the auditory mechanisms and neurophysiology of animals; the use of sound to monitor animal populations, and the effect of man-made noise on animals.

=== Electroacoustics ===
This branch of acoustic engineering deals with the design of headphones, microphones, loudspeakers, sound systems, sound reproduction, and recording. There has been a rapid increase in the use of portable electronic devices which can reproduce sound and rely on electroacoustic engineering, e.g. mobile phones, portable media players, and tablet computers.

The term "electroacoustics" is also used to describe a set of electrokinetic effects that occur in heterogeneous liquids under influence of ultrasound.

=== Environmental noise ===
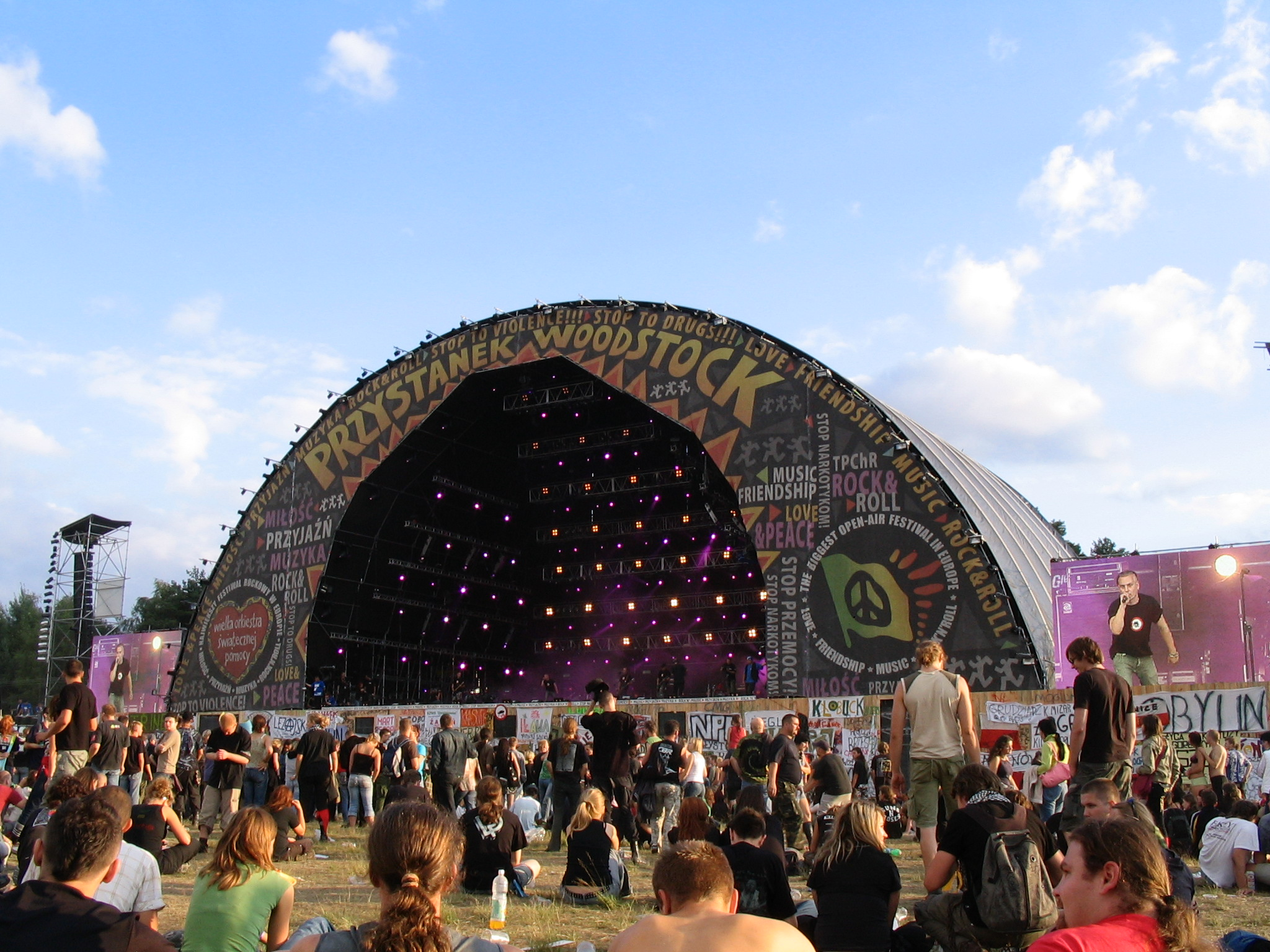
At outdoor concerts like Woodstock, acoustic analysis is critical to creating the best experience for the audience and the performers.

Environmental acoustics is concerned with the control of noise and vibrations caused by traffic, aircraft, industrial equipment, recreational activities and anything else that might be considered a nuisance. Acoustical engineers concerned with environmental acoustics face the challenge of measuring or predicting likely noise levels, determining an acceptable level for that noise, and determining how the noise can be controlled. Environmental acoustics work is usually done by acoustic consultants or those working in environmental health. Recent research work has put a strong emphasis on soundscapes, the positive use of sound (e.g. fountains, bird song), and the preservation of tranquility.

=== Musical acoustics ===
Musical acoustics is concerned with researching and describing the physics of music and its perception – how sounds employed as music work. This includes: the function and design of musical instruments including electronic synthesizers; the human voice (the physics and neurophysiology of singing); computer analysis of music and composition; the clinical use of music in music therapy, and the perception and cognition of music.

=== Noise control ===
Noise control is a set of strategies to reduce noise pollution by reducing noise at its source, by inhibiting sound propagation using noise barriers or similar, or by the use of ear protection (earmuffs or earplugs). Control at the source is the most cost-effective way of providing noise control. Noise control engineering applied to cars and trucks is known as noise, vibration, and harshness (NVH). Other techniques to reduce product noise include vibration isolation, application of acoustic absorbent and acoustic enclosures. Acoustical engineering can go beyond noise control to look at what is the best sound for a product, for instance, manipulating the sound of door closures on automobiles.

=== Psychoacoustics ===
Psychoacoustics tries to explain how humans respond to what they hear, whether that is an annoying noise or beautiful music. In many branches of acoustic engineering, a human listener is a final arbitrator as to whether a design is successful, for instance, whether sound localisation works in a surround sound system. "Psychoacoustics seeks to reconcile acoustical stimuli and all the scientific, objective, and physical properties that surround them, with the physiological and psychological responses evoked by them."

=== Speech ===
Speech is a major area of study for acoustical engineering, including the production, processing and perception of speech. This can include physics, physiology, psychology, audio signal processing and linguistics. Speech recognition and speech synthesis are two important aspects of the machine processing of speech. Ensuring speech is transmitted intelligibly, efficiently and with high quality; in rooms, through public address systems and through telephone systems are other important areas of study.

=== Ultrasonics ===
Ultrasound image of a fetus in the womb, viewed at 12 weeks of pregnancy (bidimensional-scan)

Ultrasonics deals with sound waves in solids, liquids and gases at frequencies too high to be heard by the average person. Specialist areas include medical ultrasonics (including medical ultrasonography), sonochemistry, nondestructive testing, material characterisation and underwater acoustics (sonar).

=== Underwater acoustics ===
Underwater acoustics is the scientific study of sound in water. It is concerned with both natural and man-made sound and its generation underwater; how it propagates, and the perception of the sound by animals. Applications include sonar to locate submerged objects such as submarines, underwater communication by animals, observation of sea temperatures for climate change monitoring, and marine biology.

=== Vibration and dynamics ===
Acoustic engineers working on vibration study the motions and interactions of mechanical systems with their environments, including measurement, analysis and control. This might include: ground vibrations from railways and construction; vibration isolation to reduce noise getting into recording studios; studying the effects of vibration on humans (vibration white finger); vibration control to protect a bridge from earthquakes, or modelling the propagation of structure-borne sound through buildings.

== Fundamental science ==
Although the way in which sound interacts with its surroundings is often extremely complex, there are a few ideal sound wave behaviours that are fundamental to understanding acoustical design. Complex sound wave behaviors include absorption, reverberation, diffraction, and refraction. Absorption is the loss of energy that occurs when a sound wave reflects off of a surface, and refers to both the sound energy transmitted through and dissipated by the surface material. Reverberation is the persistence of sound caused by repeated boundary reflections after the source of the sound stops. This principle is particularly important in enclosed spaces. Diffraction is the bending of sound waves around surfaces in the path of the wave. Refraction is the bending of sound waves caused by changes in the medium through which the wave is passing. For example, temperature gradients can cause sound wave refraction. Acoustical engineers apply these fundamental concepts, along with mathematical analysis, to control sound for a variety of applications.

== Associations ==
- Acoustical Society of America Technical Committee on Engineering Acoustics
- Audio Engineering Society
- Australian Acoustical Society
- Canadian Acoustical Association
- Institute of Acoustics, Chinese Academy of Sciences
- Institute of Acoustics (United Kingdom)
- Danish Sound Cluster (Denmark)

== See also ==
- Audio Engineering
- Category:Acoustical engineers
- Category:Audio engineers
