= Hiroka Matsumoto =

Japanese violinist (born 1995)

Hiroka Matsumoto 松本 紘佳
- Born: April 27; Japan
- Origin: Yokohama, Japan
- Occupation: Violinist
- Years active: 1999–present
- Website: https://www.hirokamatsumoto.com

Hiroka Matsumoto (松本 紘佳, Matsumoto Hiroka; born April 27 in Japan) is a Japanese violinist.

== Early life ==
Matsumoto was born in Japan. She lived at Aoba-ku, Yokohama City from age of three. She began to learn the violin from the age of four, and made her debut at Philia Hall three months later.

== Career ==
Matsumoto was observed as "extremely gifted and blessed a huge potential capacity" and it was said that she "will undoubtedly grow into a unique musical personality" by Zakhar Bron at seven years old. At the age of nine, she gave her first recital in Budapest, Hungary. At the age of thirteen in 2008, she played and conducted the Franz Liszt Chamber Orchestra for The Four Seasons of Vivaldi.

At The National Art Center, Tokyo in 2009, she played a smaller violin, which had been used by Mozart in childhood. This attracted attention as the first concert using that particular small violin, which was made in 1746, outside of Austria.

In Japan, Matsumoto studied under Koichiro Harada, a professor of Toho Gakuen School of Music, and Gérard Poulet. She was given a scholarship by the Toho Gakuen School of Music Soloist Diploma course. Matsumoto studied under professor Boris Kuschnir, Boris Brovtsyn and others at Konservatorium Wien and University of Music and Performing Arts, Vienna.

In 2009-2011 Matsumoto got a scholarship of Yamaha Music Foundation. In 2012-2013, she was also awarded a music scholarship from The Meiji Yasuda Cultural Foundation. She studied in Vienna for three years starting in the fall of 2014 as a trainee of an up-and-coming artists overseas study program of the Agency for Cultural Affairs of Japan. She received a Bachelor of Arts from the Music and Arts University of the City of Vienna in three years, and graduated Master of Arts with the highest grade in 2019. In 2022, she received her second time bachelor's degree at the Faculty of Policy Management at Keio University biology lab, researched the effects of violin playing on animal behavior. In 2023, she received Concertmaster Artist Diploma from Academia Stauffer Concertmaster in Cremona, Italy.

Since 2024 she has been a scholarship student at Cleveland Institute of Music in Cleveland, US and performing as a soloist both in US and Japan.

== Awards ==
- 2006 - Międzynarodowy Konkurs Młodych Skrzypków im. Karola Lipińskiego i Henryka Wieniawskiego (Poland), Junior Division, Second Prize (youngest)
- 2007 - All Japan Students Music Competition, Elementary School Part, First Prize (the highest score in all parts)
- 2009 - Yehudi Menuhin Award (highest award) - Kronberg Academy (Germany)
- 2009 - IMA Music Awards - Ishikawa Music Academy
- 2010 - ABC Music Prize (youngest)
- 2015 - Fidelio Competition. Winner (Vienna, Austria)
- 2016 - International Chamber Music Competition Città di Pinerolo e Torino Città metropolitana. 3rd Prize (Italy)
- 2016 - Osaka International Competition Duo Category, 1st Prize (Japan)
- 2016 - The Art of Duo, Boulder International Chamber Music Competition. 3rd Prize (US)
- 2023 - Salzburg-Mozart International Chambermusic Competition in Tokyo 3rd Prize (Japan)
- 2024 - Dean Award (Japan)
- 2025 - Cleveland Institute of Music Concerto Competition, Winner (US)

== Recitals ==
Matsumoto opened the following recitals in Japan.

- 2009-04 - Tsuda Hall (Shibuya-ku, Tokyo)
- 2011-03 - Yokohama Minato Mirai Hall
- 2011-04 - Philia Hall
- 2011-07 - JT Art Hall Affinis ... Dolphin Trio
- 2011-09 - Musashino Civic Cultural Hall ... Piano: Eliane Reyes
- 2011-10 - Nakano ZERO, Planetarium
- 2011-11 - Nakano ZERO, Large Hall
- 2012-05 - Act Tower Music Workshop Hall
- 2014-11 - Philia Hall - Aoba-ku 20th Anniversary Concert
- 2018-09 - Takashi Sato & Hiroka Matsumoto Duo Recital
- 2018-09 - Takeshi Takehashi & Hiroka Matsumoto Duo Recital

== Concerts ==
In Japan

- 2008 - Kanagawa Philharmonic Orchestra (conductor: Kazumasa Watanabe, Yoko Matsuo) - Suntory Hall, Great Hall
- 2008 - Tokyo Symphony Orchestra (conductor: Naoto Otomo, Norichika Iimori) - Suntory Hall, Great Hall
- 2009 - Tokyo City Philharmonic Orchestra (conductor: Ryusuke Numajiri) - Showa Women's University Hitomi Kinen Kōdō ... "Untitled Concert"
- 2009 - Kanagawa Philharmonic Orchestra (conductor: Yoko Matsuo) - Kanagawa Prefectural Civic Hall, Great Hall
- 2010 - Tokyo Symphony Orchestra (conductor: Norichika Iimori) - Muza Kawasaki Symphony Hall
- 2010 - Orchestra Ensemble Kanazawa (conductor: Michiyoshi Inoue) - Ishikawa Ongakudō
- 2011 - Osaka Century Symphony Orchestra (conductor: Shigeo Genda) - The Symphony Hall ... ABC Fresh Concert
- 2011 - Yamaha Music Scholarship Concert, Vol. 2 - Yamaha Hall
- 2011 - New Japan Philharmonic (conductor: Jonathan Schiffman) - Musashino Civic Cultural Hall
- 2012 - Japan Philharmonic Orchestra (conductor: Mitsuhashi Keiko) - Suginami Public Hall, Great Hall
- 2019 Barrier-free concert—Let's Come Together—István Kohán & Hiroka Matsumoto Joint Concert. Philia Hall

Outside Japan

- 2008 - Franz Liszt Chamber Orchestra - Budapest
- 2010 - Gyor Philharmonic Orchestra subscription concert (conductor: Kálmán Berkes) - Hungary

== Filmography ==
=== TV ===
- 未来の大器 2009, 題名のない音楽会 [Diamonds in Future 2009, Untitled Concert] (Television production). TV Asahi. 18 October 2009. Video.
- Győri Filharmonikus Zenekar koncertje [Gyor Philharmonic Orchestra subscription concert] (Television production). Magyar Televízió (state-run broadcasting of Hungary). 14 December 2010.
- Gyor Philharmonic Orchestra subscription concert was broadcast in Slovakia on 2010-12.
