= Nobuyuki Tsujii =

Japanese pianist and composer (born 1988)

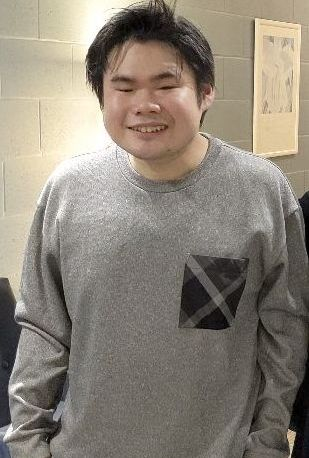
- Nobuyuki Tsujii, La Jolla, California, 3.28.2025

Background information
- Born: Nobuyuki Tsujii (辻井 伸行); September 13, 1988 (age 38); Tokyo, Japan
- Occupations: Composer; pianist
- Instrument: Piano
- Website: avex.jp/tsujii/

Nobuyuki Tsujii (辻井 伸行, Tsujii Nobuyuki) (also known as Nobu Tsujii) is a Japanese pianist and composer. He was born blind due to microphthalmia. Tsujii performs extensively, with a large number of conductors and orchestras, and has received critical acclaim for his unique techniques for learning music and performing with an orchestra while being unable to see.

== Early life and education ==
Nobuyuki Tsujii was born blind due to microphthalmia. From an early age, he exhibited exceptional talent and musical ability. At age two, he began to play "Do Re Mi" on a toy piano after hearing his mother hum the tune. He began formal piano study at the age of four. In 1995, at age seven, Tsujii won the first prize at the All Japan Music of Blind Students by the Tokyo Helen Keller Association. In 1998, at age ten, he debuted with the Century Orchestra, Osaka.

He gave his first piano recital in the small hall of Tokyo's Suntory Hall at age 12. Subsequently, he made his overseas debut with performances in the United States, France, and Russia. In October 2005, he reached the semifinal and received the Critics' Award at the 15th International Frédéric Chopin Piano Competition held in Warsaw, Poland.

In April 2007, Tsujii entered Ueno Gakuen University majoring in music performance in piano, graduating in March 2011.

== Career ==
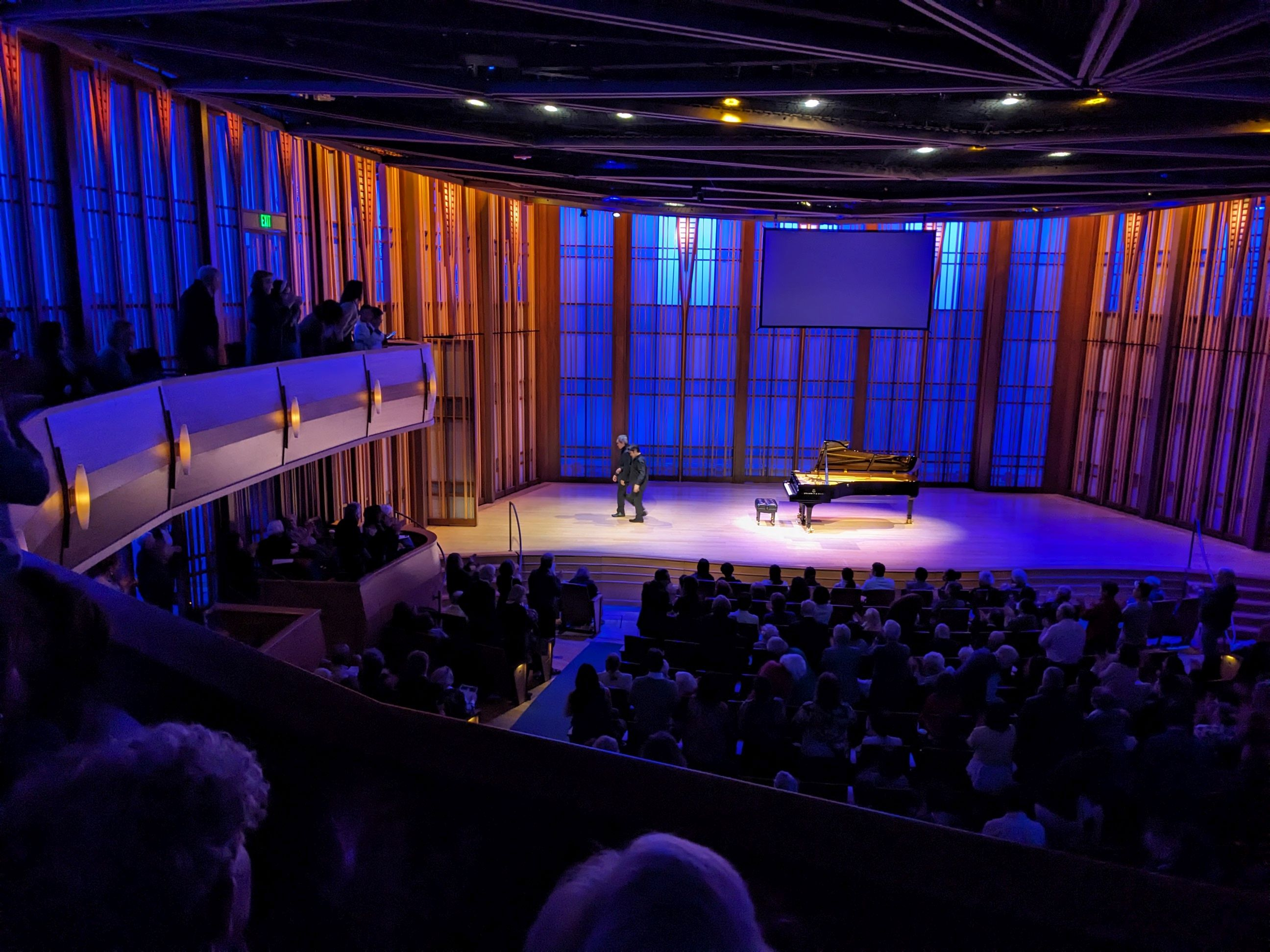
Nobuyuki Tsujii in recital at the Conrad Prebys Performing Arts Center, La Jolla, California, March 28, 2025.

Tsujii competed in the 2009 Van Cliburn International Piano Competition and tied for the gold medal with Haochen Zhang. He was also awarded the Beverley Taylor Smith Award for the best performance of a new work. He played all twelve of Frédéric Chopin's Études (Op. 10) as part of his performance in the preliminaries. Tsujii was one of the competitors prominently featured in the Peter Rosen documentary film about the 2009 Van Cliburn competition, A Surprise in Texas, which was first broadcast on PBS TV in 2010.

In addition to being a pianist, Tsujii is a composer. At age 12, he performed his own composition "Street Corner of Vienna". He has since released numerous albums of his own compositions. He is also a film music composer and the 2011 recipient of the Japan Film Critics Award for Film Music.

On November 10, 2011, Tsujii made his debut in the Stern Auditorium at Carnegie Hall in New York, as part of the Keyboard Virtuosos II series. Tsujii debuted at the BBC Proms on July 16, 2013, with a performance with the BBC Philharmonic conducted by Juanjo Mena.

Tsujii is featured in a 2013 English textbook for high schools in Japan. A 2014 film Touching the Sound, also by Peter Rosen, documents Tsujii's life from birth to his 2011 Carnegie Hall debut, including footage of his visit to the region in Japan that suffered the devastating aftermath of the 2011 Tōhoku earthquake and tsunami.

He won the 1st Prize at the InterArtia 2015 international competition by the International Art Society in Volos, Greece. In 2016, he performed with the Naumburg Orchestral Concerts, in the Naumburg Bandshell, Central Park, in the summer series.

On April 21, 2024, Tsujii became the first Japanese pianist to sign an exclusive contract with Deutsche Grammophon

== Music ==
=== Method ===
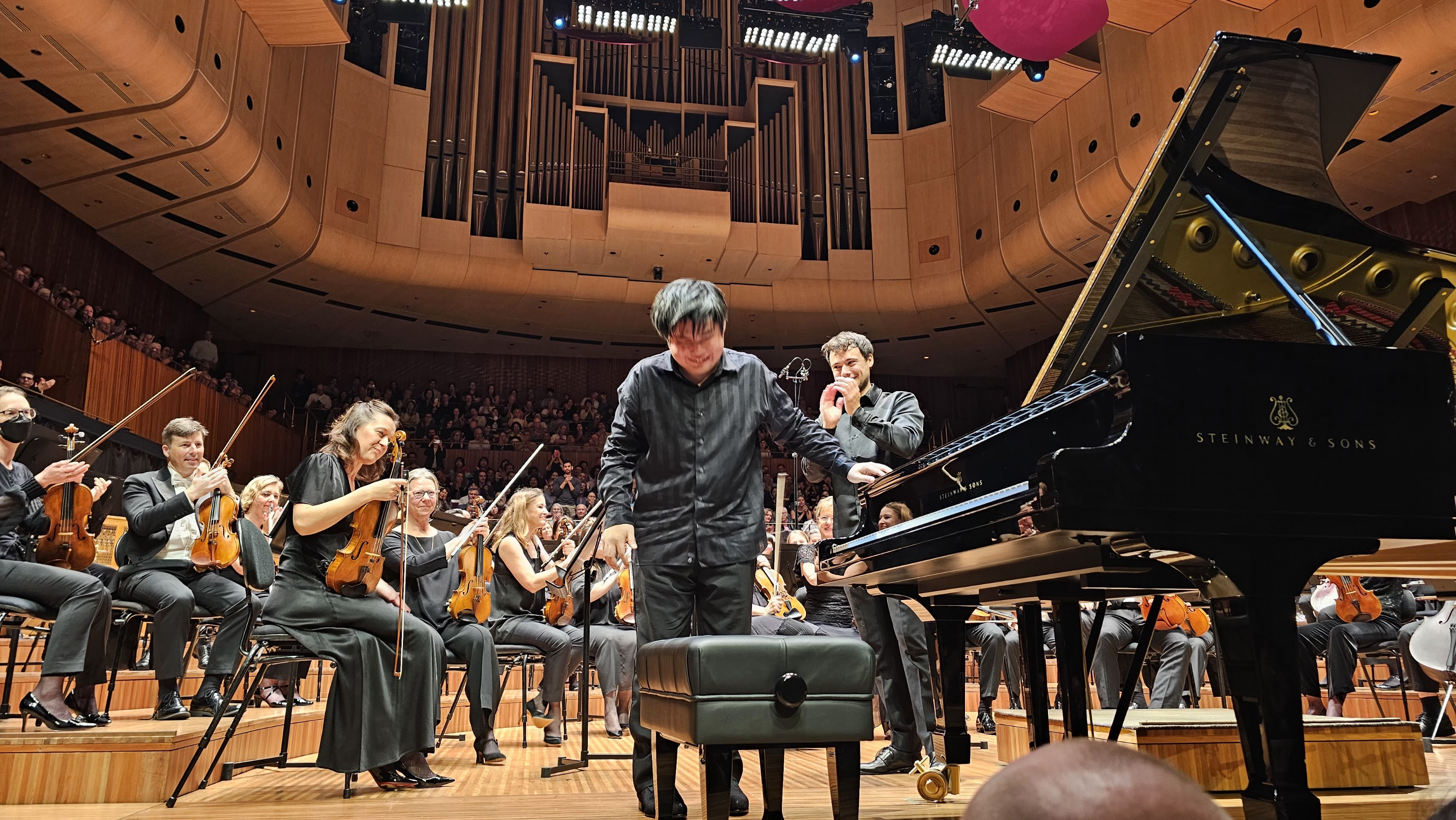
Nobuyuki Tsujii performs with the Sydney Symphony Orchestra at Sydney Opera House, October 25, 2024

Tsujii learns new musical works strictly by ear. A 2009 Time article explains: "Certainly, being blind hasn't made it easy. Tsujii can use Braille music scores to learn new pieces, but this kind of translation is usually done by volunteers. Because demand is so low, the variety of scores available does not meet the needs of a professional performer, so Tsujii has devised his own method. A team of pianists records scores along with specific codes and instructions written by composers, which Tsujii listens to and practices until he learns and perfects each piece."

Tsujii said in a 2011 interview, "I learn pieces by listening, but it doesn't mean I'm copying CDs or another person's interpretation. I ask my assistants to make a special cassette tape for me. They split the piece into small sections, such as several bars, and record it (one hand at a time). I call these tapes 'music sheets for ears.' It takes me a few days to complete a short piece, but it takes one month to complete a big sonata or concerto."

In 2026, an episode of a Japanese TV program aired on July 19 shows that instead of listening to recordings, Tsujii now learns a new work by listening to the notes being played by an assistant seated at an adjacent piano.

=== Performance technique ===
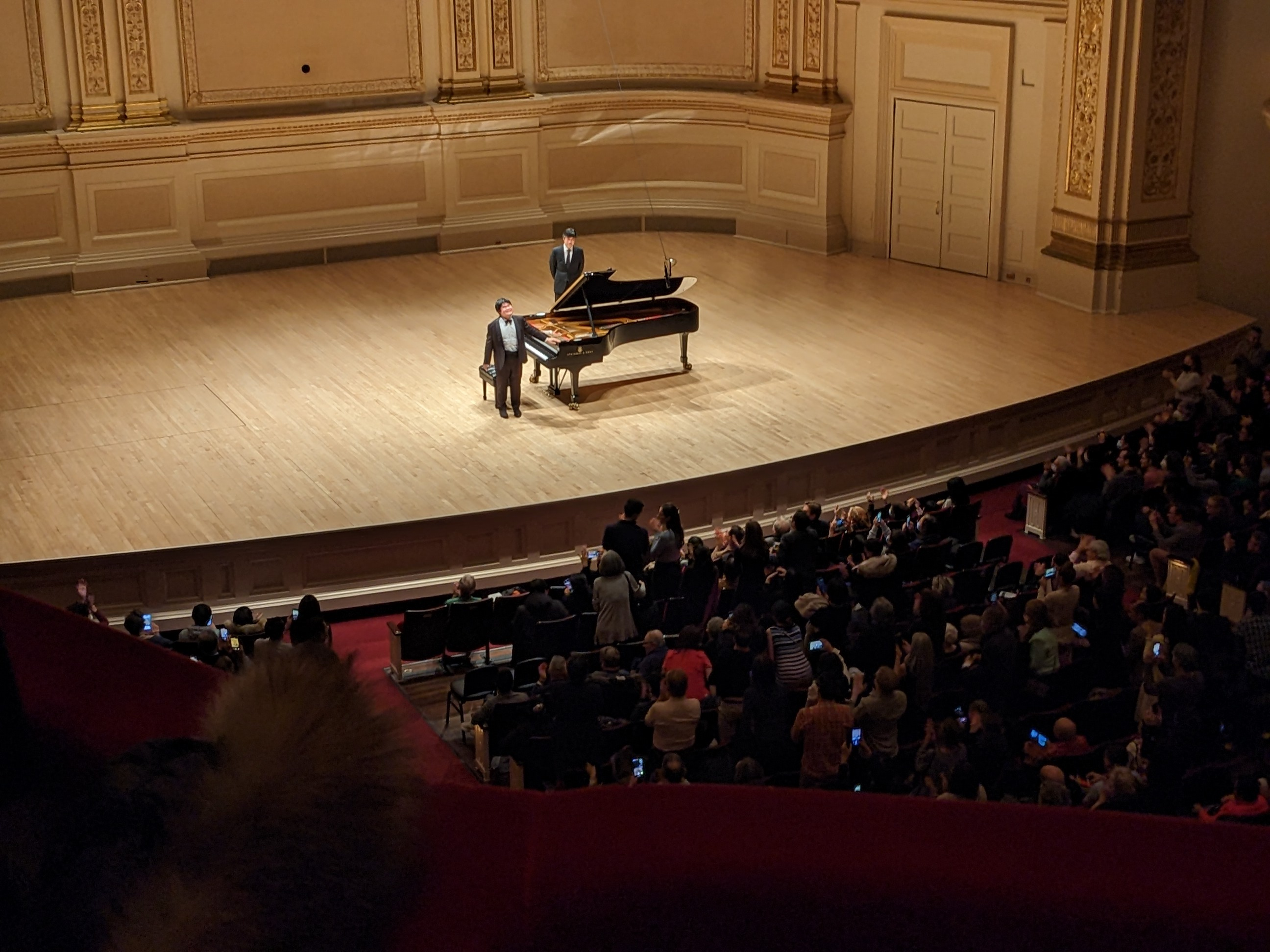
Nobuyuki Tsujii performs at Carnegie Hall January 19, 2023

In 2017, a reporter from the Australian Broadcasting Corporation, Monique Schafter, asked Tsujii "How do you stay in time when you can't see the conductor?" The pianist replied: " By listening to the conductor's breath and also sensing what's happening around me." The late conductor Bramwell Tovey commented: "He must have very acute hearing, I'm sure."

At a 2023 BBC Proms concert, BBC Radio 3 narrator Martin Handley asked conductor Domingo Hindoyan whether he has to adjust to Tsujii's blindness in any way. Hindoyan replied, "I don't do anything different, absolutely not anything. We worked as I'd work with any soloist. And, probably the fact that he has a special way to learn pieces -- he learns them in a way that is so logical, and he is extremely sensitive. So, he really feels every instrument and every breath from myself, from the concert master and from the orchestra. It's just like he understands the piece from the very soul of it, from very deep. It's really fantastic."

=== Recordings ===
Tsujii has an extensive discography.

In 2024, Tsujii entered an exclusive recording contract with Deutsche Grammophon (DG).

His current discography can be found on his DG artist page

Following is a list of his previous CDs and DVDs:

Album title	Label	Release date	Notes
BEETHOVEN Piano Sonata No. 29 "Hammerklavier". An die ferne Geliebte	Deutsche Grammophon	November 29, 2024	recorded at Teldex Studio Berlin.
Rachmaninov Piano Concerto No. 2 & Kapustin 8 Concert Etudes	Avex Classics, Deutsche Grammophon	September 7, 2022	with Vasily Petrenko and Royal Liverpool Philharmonic Orchestra; recorded live 2019 at the Liverpool Philharmonic Symphony Hall.
Beethoven Piano Concerto No. 3	Avex Classics, Deutsche Grammophon	September 7, 2022	with Vladimir Ashkenazy and Sydney Symphony Orchestra; recorded live 2016 at the Sydney Opera House.
Maurice Ravel Works	Tonkünstler Orchestra	February 14, 2020	with Yutaka Sado and Tonkünstler Orchestra; piano concerto recorded live at the Vienna Musikverein.
Franck & Brahms Violin Sonatas, Fumiaki Miura & Nobuyuki Tsujii	Avex Classics	June 26, 2019	
Chopin: Piano Concerto No. 2, Nocturne, Nobuyuki Tsujii × Ashkenazy	Avex Classics, Deutsche Grammophon	October 31, 2018	with Deutsches Symphonie-Orchester Berlin & Vladimir Ashkenazy
Grieg Piano Concerto, Rachmaninov Paganini Rhapsody	Avex Classics, Deutsche Grammophon	May 9, 2018	with Royal Liverpool Philharmonic & Vasily Petrenko
Beethoven Pathetique, Moonlight, Appassionata	Avex Classics, Deutsche Grammophon	January 31, 2018	recorded at Teldex Studio Berlin
Début 10 years	Avex Classics	November 8, 2017	
Chopin:Etude&Ballad	Avex Classics	November 23, 2016	
Liszt Sonata in B minor & Ravel Gaspard de la nuit	Avex Classics	July 20, 2016	
Chopin Piano Concerto No. 1 & 2	Avex Classics	October 21, 2015	
Impressions	Avex Classics	July 22, 2015	14 tracks of compositions by Debussy, Ravel and the pianist himself
Nobuyuki Tsujii Works Piano with Orchestra (Maestro!)	Avex Classics	January 28, 2015	Tsujii's own compositions with orchestra
Emperor & Coronation Nobuyuki Tsujii & Orpheus Chamber Orchestra	Avex Classics	January 21, 2015	
Nobuyuki Tsujii plays Liszt (La Campanella -Virtuoso Liszt! : Nobuyuki Tsujii)	Avex Classics, Deutsche Grammophon	September 24, 2014	recorded at Teldex Studio Berlin
Touching the Sound: The Improbable Journey of Nobuyuki Tsujii (documentary)	EuroArts Music	July 2014	
月の光～辻井伸行 plays ドビュッシー (Clair de Lune - Nobuyuki Tsujii plays Debussy) CD	Avex Classics, Deutsche Grammophon	September 11, 2013	recorded at Teldex Studio Berlin
Nobuyuki Tsujii at White Nights (DVD/Blu-ray)	EuroArts Music		
ジェニーへのオマージュ 自作集CD+自作 LIVE DVD 'Tribute to Jeanie' self-composition CD and DVD	Avex Classics	December, 2012	
辻井伸行 plays 花は咲く Nobuyuki Tsujii plays 'Flowers Bloom'	Avex Classics	October 17, 2012	
辻井伸行 モーツァルト・アルバム Nobuyuki Tsujii - Mozart Album	Avex Classics, Deutsche Grammophon	September 5, 2012	
はやぶさ 遥かなる帰還 オリジナル・サウンドトラック Hayabusa Harukanaru Kikan Original Soundtrack	Avex Classics	February 8, 2012	original film music composed by Tsujii
辻井伸行 カーネギーホール・デビューLIVE Nobuyuki Tsujii Carnegie Hall Debut Live!	Avex Classics	December 28, 2011	
それでも、生きてゆく オリジナル・サウンドトラック('Still We Live'Original Sound Track)	Avex Classics	August 2011	
神様のカルテ~辻井伸行自作集 Nobuyuki Tsujii Works, 2000-2011	Avex Classics	July 2011	a collection of Tsujii's own compositions
Tchaikovsky: Piano Concerto No. 1	Avex Classics, Deutsche Grammophon	February 2011	with Yutaka Sado and the BBC Philharmonic
My Favorite Chopin Nobuyuki Tsujii	Avex Classics, Deutsche Grammophon	March 2010	recorded at Teldex Studio Berlin
Chopin: Piano Works	Victor Japan	September 2009	two discs, 10 tracks each; recorded at the Chopin Piano Competition, 2005
Pictures at an Exhibition Nobuyuki Tsujii	Avex Classics, Deutsche Grammophon	September 15, 2010	recorded at Teldex Studio Berlin
Frédéric Chopin: Piano Concerto No. 1; Études, Op. 10	harmonia mundi	2010	
Nobuyuki Tsujii Cliburn 2009 Preliminary Round Recital	harmonia mundi	2009	also available as a DVD
Nobuyuki Tsujii Cliburn Semifinal Round Recital	harmonia mundi	2009	also available as a DVD
Nobuyuki Tsujii Cliburn Competition Final Round Recital	harmonia mundi	2009	also available as a DVD
Nobuyuki Tsujii, Gold Medalist, 2009 - Winners CD	harmonia mundi	2009	
Rachmaninoff: Piano Concerto #2	Avex Trax Japan	2008	with conductor Yutaka Sado and the Deutsches Symphonie-Orchester Berlin
Début Nobuyuki Tsujii	Avex Entertainment	2007	contains one disc of recitals of works of Chopin, Liszt, and Ravel; and a second disc with five original compositions of Tsujii

=== Conductors and orchestras ===
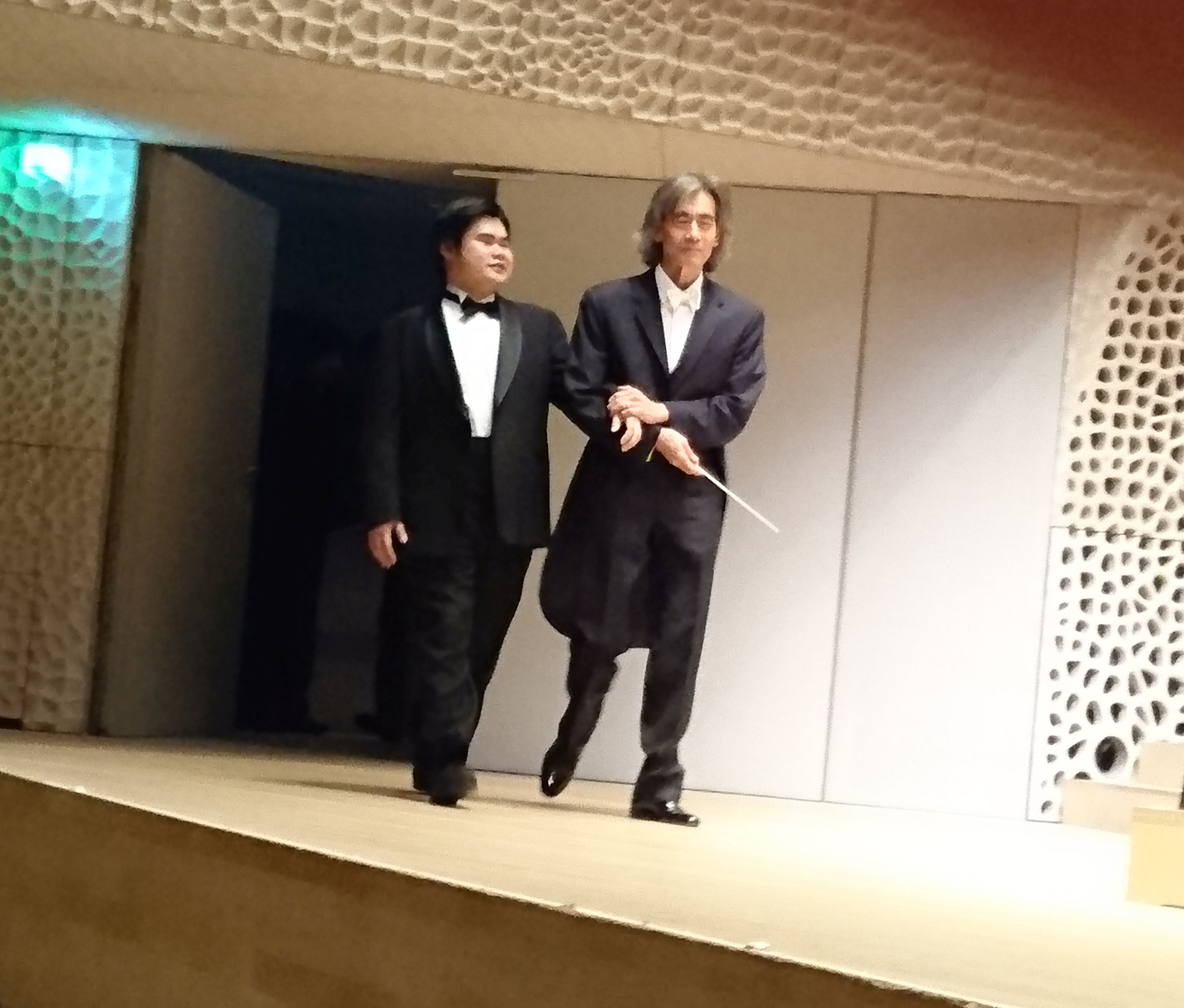
Nobuyuki Tsujii & conductor Kent Nagano at the Elbphilharmonie, 2019.

Tsujii has performed with numerous orchestras under the baton of many conductors, both in Japan and abroad. Conductors that he has performed with include:

- Klaus Makela (Oslo Philharmonic Orchestra, Orchestre de Paris)
- Vladimir Ashkenazy (Philharmonia Orchestra, Orchestra Ensemble Kanazawa, Sydney Symphony Orchestra, Deutsches Symphonie-Orchester Berlin and Iceland Symphony Orchestra)
- Valery Gergiev (Mariinsky Theatre Orchestra, Orchestra Teatro alla Scala and Munich Philharmonic)
- Vladimir Spivakov (Moscow Virtuosi Chamber Orchestra)
- Vasily Petrenko (Royal Liverpool Philharmonic, Royal Philharmonic Orchestra, Oslo Philharmonic Orchestra)
- Bramwell Tovey(Sydney Symphony Orchestra)
- Vladimir Jurowski (London Philharmonic Orchestra)
- Michael Sanderling (Dresden Philharmonic, Romanian Youth Orchestra)
- Kent Nagano (Hamburg Philharmonic)
- Andrew Manze (NDR Radiophilharmonie)
- Patrick Hahn Orchestra Ensemble Kanazawa
- Yutaka Sado (Tonkünstler Orchestra, BBC Philharmonic, Deutsches Symphonie-Orchester Berlin)
- James Conlon (Fort Worth Symphony Orchestra)
- Miguel Harth-Bedoya (Fort Worth Symphony Orchestra)
- Darrell Ang (Royal Liverpool Philharmonic)
- Marko Letonja (Orchestre philharmonique de Strasbourg)
- Neil Thomson(Yomiuri Nippon Symphony Orchestra)
- Juanjo Mena (BBC Philharmonic)
- Randall Craig Fleischer( Hudson Valley Philharmonic, Youngstown Symphony Orchestra)
- John Giordano (Corpus Christi Symphony Orchestra)
- Thierry Fischer (Swiss Italian Orchestra)
- Jean-Marie Zeitouni ( Edmonton Symphony Orchestra)
- Paolo Carignani (Yomiuri Nippon Symphony Orchestra)
- Mitiyoshi Inoue(Orchestra Ensemble Kanazawa)
- Yuzo Toyama (NHK Symphony Orchestra )
- Eliahu Inbal (Tokyo Metropolitan Symphony Orchestra)
- Michael Collins (Sinfonieorchester Basel)
- Lukasz Borowicz (Poznan Philharmonic Orchestra)
- Kazuyoshi Akiyama (Hiroshima Symphony Orchestra)
- Tatsuya Shimono (Yomiuri Nippon Symphony Orchestra, Hiroshima Symphony Orchestra, Bilbao Symphony Orchestra)
- Alexander Mickelthwate (Winnipeg Symphony Orchestra)
- Stilian Kirov (substituting for Ludovic Morlot) (Seattle Symphony Orchestra)
- Arild Remmereit (Baltimore Symphony Orchestra
- Andriy Yurkevych (Munich Symphony Orchestra)
- Scott Speck (Mobile Symphony Orchestra)
- Kaspar Zehnder (Sinfonieorchester Basel)
- Pascal Rophé (substituting for Marc Minkowski) (Orchestra Ensemble Kanazawa)
- Yuko Tanaka (Orchestra Ensemble Kanazawa)
- Michiyoshi Inoue (Orchestra Ensemble Kanazawa)
- Ronald Feldman (Longwood Symphony Orchestra)
- Sylvain Cambreling (Yomiuri Nippon Symphony Orchestra)
- Christopher Warren-Green(Yomiuri Nippon Symphony Orchestra)
- Tetsuji Honna (Tokyo Philharmonic Orchestra)
- Kosuke Tsunoda (Tokyo Philharmonic Orchestra)
- Kazuki Yamada, Yokohama Sinfonietta
- Robert Trevino, Orchestra Sinfonica di Milano Giuseppe Verdi
- Naoto Ōtomo, (Ryukyu Symphony orchestra)
- Fumiaki Miura, ARK sinfonietta
- Ryusuke Numajiri, (Yomiuri Nippon Symphony Orchestra)
- Takeshi Oi, (Tokyo Kosei Wind Orchestra)
- Louis Langrée (Los Angeles Philharmonic)
- Sebastian Weigle (Yomiuri Nippon Symphony Orchestra)
- Domingo Hindoyan (Royal Liverpool Philharmonic)
- Erik Nielsen (conductor) (Bilbao Orkestra Sinfonikoa)
- Jiří Rožeň (Seattle Symphony)
- Alexander Shelley (National Arts Centre Orchestra)
- Peter Oundjian (Sarasota Orchestra, Chicago Symphony Orchestra)
- Marc Leroy-Calatayud (Orchestra Ensemble Kanazawa)
- Ryusuke Numajiri (Kanagawa Philharmonic Orchestra)
- Sesto Quatrini (Orchestra Sinfonica di Milano Giuseppe Verdi)
- Robin Ticciati (London Philharmonic Orchestra)
- Lio Kuokman (Macao Orchestra)
- Eduardo Strasser (Malaysian Philharmonic Orchestra, Queensland Symphony Orchestra)
- Nicolas Ellis, (Sydney Symphony Orchestra)
- Eivind Aadland, (Tasmanian Symphony Orchestra)
- Santtu-Matias Rouvali, (Philharmonia Orchestra)
- Tadaaki Otaka, (Yomiuri Nippon Symphony Orchestra)
- Aziz Shokhakimov, (Seattle Symphony)
- Dima Slobodeniouk, (Cleveland Orchestra)
- Giedrė Šlekytė, (Los Angeles Philharmonic)
- Andrea Battistoni, (Tokyo Philharmonic Orchestra)

Tsujii has also performed with ensembles including the Takács Quartet, the Orpheus Chamber Orchestra and the Chamber Orchestra of Europe.

=== Piano concertos ===
Piano concertos that Tsujii has performed include Piano Concerto No. 1 (Beethoven), Piano Concerto No. 2 (Beethoven), Piano Concerto No. 3 (Beethoven), Piano Concerto No. 4 (Beethoven), Piano Concerto No. 5 (Beethoven), Piano Concerto No. 1 (Tchaikovsky), Piano Concerto No. 3 (Prokofiev), Piano Concerto (Grieg), Piano Concerto No. 2 (Rachmaninoff), Piano Concerto No. 3 (Rachmaninoff), Piano Concerto No. 20 (Mozart), Piano Concerto No. 21 (Mozart), Piano Concerto No. 26 (Mozart), Piano Concerto No. 27 (Mozart), Piano Concerto No. 1 (Chopin), Piano Concerto No. 2 (Chopin), Piano Concerto in G (Ravel), Piano Concerto No. 1 (Liszt), Piano Concerto No. 1 (Shostakovich), Piano Concerto No. 2 (Shostakovich), Piano Concerto (Schumann) and Piano Concerto for Nobuyuki Tsujii by Shigeaki Saegusa . He has also performed Gershwin's Rhapsody in Blue and Rachmaninov's Rhapsody on a Theme of Paganini.

=== Compositions ===
In addition to being a pianist, Tsujii is a composer.

At age 12, he performed his own composition "Street Corner of Vienna."

In 2010–2011, he composed the theme music for a Japanese film '神様のカルテ (In His Chart)', for which he was named the 2011 Film Music Artist by the Japan Film Critics Award. That same year, he also composed the theme music for a Japanese TV drama 'それでも、生きてゆく (Still We Live On)'.

In June 2011, Japanese figure skating champion Midori Ito performed in a world event (Master Elite Oberstdorf 2011) to the music of "Whisper of the River," composed by Tsujii when he was in high school to express his love for his father after the two took a walk on the Kanda River in Tokyo.

Tsujii was the music director and composed the theme music for the Japanese film はやぶさ 遥かなる帰還 The Return of the Hayabusa released in February 2012. In 2014, he composed the ending theme for the film 'マエストロ(Maestro!)'.

In 2016, Tsujii created and performed the background music for a series of three animation of Chōjū-jinbutsu-giga scrolls produced by Studio Ghibli for Marubeni Corporation.

Tsujii's 2011 performance of his own composition, "Elegy for the Victims of the Tsunami of March 11, 2011 in Japan", is widely viewed on the Internet.

At the 2020 Summer Paralympics opening ceremony, a recording of a composition by Tsujii ("House of Wind") was played while the flag of Japan was carried on stage.

=== Performances in Japan ===
In his native country, Nobuyuki Tsujii often appears in prestigious performances of national significance. On June 29, 2019, he performed in Osaka for leaders from the Group of 20 major economies. On November 9, 2019, Tsujii performed at the National Celebration for the Enthronement of Emperor Naruhito.

=== Charity ===
In the wake of Japan's 2011 Tōhoku earthquake and tsunami, Tsujii made numerous contributions to the restoration efforts. He was featured in an original short film "Lights of Japan" shown at the World Economics Summit in Davos, Switzerland, in January 2012. In the film, he performed on a grand piano restored from the ravage of the March 2011 tsunami that devastated Eastern Japan. Additionally, he performed in numerous charity concerts on behalf of Japan's 2011 earthquake and tsunami victims, including a UNESCO concert held in Paris on March 11, 2012. Part of the proceeds from his 2012 Flowers Bloom CD goes towards Japan's earthquake reconstruction effort.

In addition to his earthquake relief effort, Tsujii frequently performs benefit concerts, such as for children's hospitals, the Japanese Red Cross and the disabled.

In the summer of 2012, Tsujii contributed to a one-million rubles donation from the proceeds of an acclaimed concert, in which he performed on July 8 with conductor Valery Gergiev and the Mariinsky Theatre Orchestra, to the victims of a flood in Kuban that occurred the night before.

On October 25, 2015, Tsujii performed with the Longwood Symphony Orchestra in Boston, in partnership with the Japan Society of Boston and the Berklee College of Music, benefiting the Boston Higashi School and the Fukushima Youth Sinfonietta. On the next day, Tsujii paid a special visit to the Higashi School and "inspired children and staff alike".

In Taiwan on April 15, 2019, Tsujii visited the Taichung Hui Ming School for the Blind at the invitation of the TSMC Culture and Education Foundation, where he performed and spoke to the students, encouraging them to fulfill their potentials.

On March 11, 2021, the 10th anniversary of Japan's 2011 Tōhoku earthquake and tsunami, Tsujii performed in a special concert at Nippon Budokan Hall in Tokyo "to bring together those affected by the disasters and those who have offered support for reconstruction".

On November 2, 2023, Tsujii held a charity performance in Nagoya, Japan, for Japan's AJU Independence House, whose mission is to support "people with severe disabilities [to] continue to work towards social independence."

Tsujii continues to hold benefit performances regularly in Japan.

=== Outreach ===
In a published eulogy for pianist Van Cliburn, Tsujii wrote: "I heard about his illness and visited him at his home on February 2nd of this year [2013]. He stood up to greet me, and talked with me for more than the scheduled 30 minutes. Our conversation went from advice on playing techniques, to the importance of telling more people about the beauty of classical music, a very wide range of things; it was sprinkled with jokes and stories, and he was very happy. He said that Cliburn medalists like us, in addition to striving to deepen our own musical understanding, can make a strong impression on others to attract them to classical music."

Tsujii takes these words to heart, and has traveled to remote corners of the world to hold concerts. While on tour, he enjoys visiting local elementary schools to engage the students in classical music.

== Accolades ==
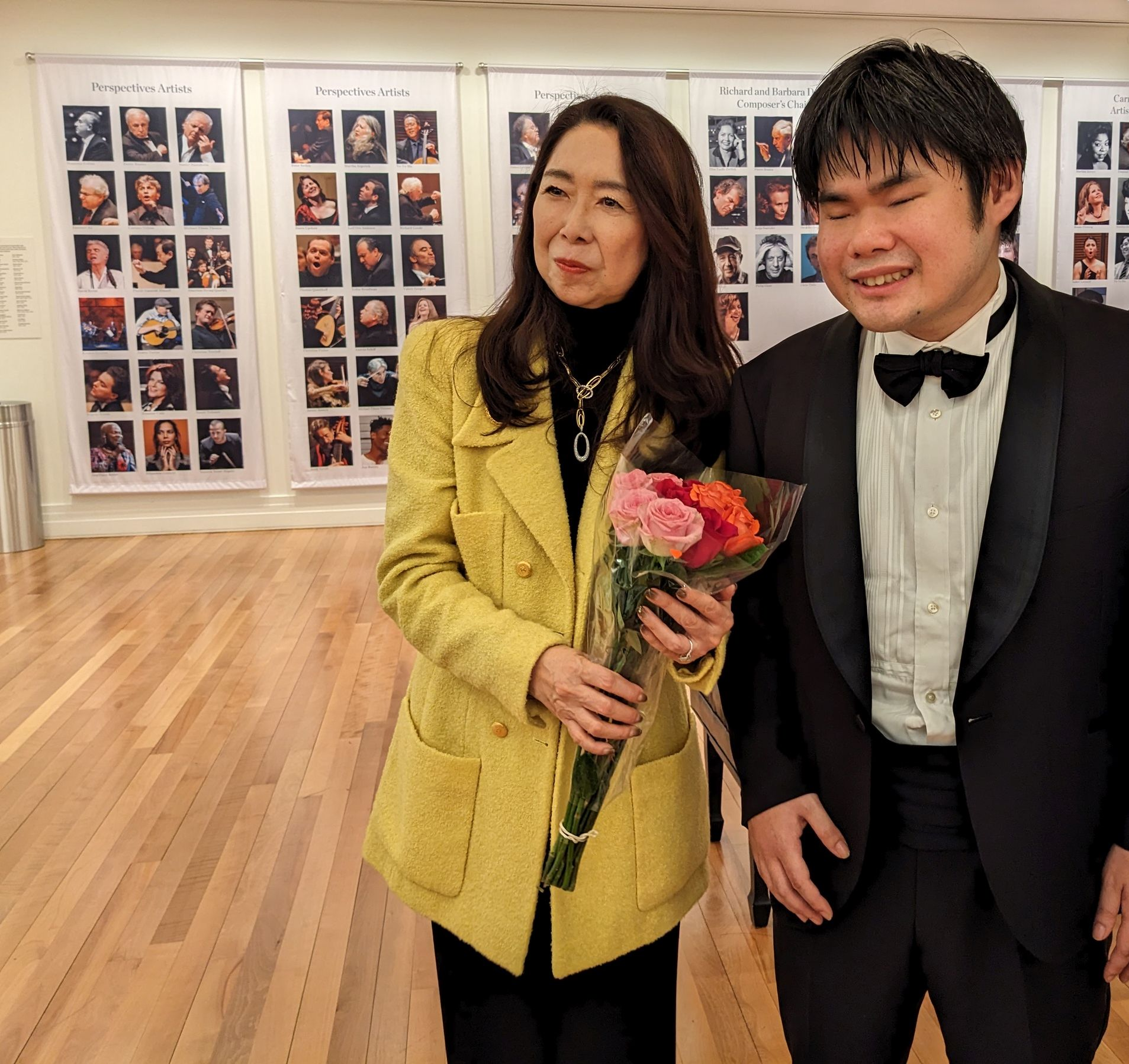
Nobuyuki Tsujii with mother Itsuko at Carnegie Hall 2023

Van Cliburn is quoted as having told the Fort Worth Star-Telegram, "He was absolutely miraculous. His performance had the power of a healing service. It was truly divine." 2009 Van Cliburn Competition Juror Richard Dyer, a chief music critic for The Boston Globe, said, "Very seldom do I close my notebook and just give myself over to it, and he made that necessary. I didn't want to be interrupted in what I was hearing."

2009 Van Cliburn Competition Juror Michel Béroff, an award-winning internationally known pianist, told the Japanese monthly piano magazine Chopin, "The special thing about his performance is his sound. It has depth, color and contrast, the genuine music."

In the documentary A Surprise in Texas, Menahem Pressler, Cliburn juror and an eminent pianist, says: "I have the utmost admiration for [Tsujii]. God has taken his eyes, but given him the physical endowment and mental endowment to encompass the greatest works of piano. For him to play the Chopin concerto with such sweetness, gentleness and sincerity -- it's deeply touching. I had to keep from crying when I left the room."

Scott Cantrell in his review of the 2009 Van Cliburn competition for The Dallas Morning News wrote that "It's almost beyond imagining that he has learned scores as formidable as Rachmaninoff's Second Piano Concerto and Beethoven's Hammerklavier Sonata by ear...Through all three rounds, he played with unfailing assurance, and his unforced, utterly natural Chopin E-Minor Piano Concerto was an oasis of loveliness."

John Giordano, music director and conductor of Corpus Christi Symphony Orchestra who was jury chairman for the Cliburn competition, said in 2010, "He's amazing. We closed our eyes and it's so phenomenal that it's hard to withhold your tears. Nobu played the most difficult hour-long Beethoven piece (Hammerklavier, Sonata no. 29) flawlessly. For anyone, it's extraordinary. But for someone blind who learns by ear, it's mind-boggling."

In an interview after the November 2011 Carnegie Hall debut recital of Tsujii, Van Cliburn said on TV Asahi, "What a thrill to hear this brilliant, very gifted, fabulous pianist. You feel God's presence in the room when he played. His soul is so pure. His music is so wonderful, and it goes to infinity to the highest heaven."

In a 2014 review in The Daily Telegraph, David Fanning wrote, "...Nobuyuki Tsujii's performance of Prokofiev's Piano Concerto No. 3. This was not just supersonic in its tempos but remarkably clean, and also responsive to the fairy-tale poetry that sets off the steely aggression." On Tsujii's debut performance with the Munich Philharmonic on November 4, 2015, the Münchner Merkur wrote "At first he seems a little uncertain, but as soon as he sits down at the piano, he is like a different person. The supposed handicap turns out to be his strength: The Japanese sinks into Beethoven's fifth piano concerto. The high chords of the second movement seem to float with his feather-light touch."

Upon the conclusion of a tour in Japan with Tsujii in November 2015, conductor Valery Gergiev said: "He is not only a great musician and star in Japan, he shows that the human resources are virtually limitless. He shows that there is practically nothing that a human being cannot do."

Conductor Bramwell Tovey, who performed with Tsujii and the Sydney Symphony Orchestra at the Sydney Opera House in May 2017, made this comment: "There are lots of pianists who find Chopin baffling. But he's found a way that almost simplifies it, without simplifying any of the technical difficulties, and I mean he makes light of the technical difficulties. He has just found a way to express all of those different emotions on the journey until in the end there's just this incredible feeling of for me, sunlight. I just love playing with him."

In 2017, on the tenth anniversary of Tsujii's career début, pianist-conductor Vladimir Ashkenazy commented: "Nobuyuki Tsujii is one of my very favourite young pianists. He possesses a rare combination of excellent pianism and genuinely expressive musicianship. It is always a great pleasure to work with him and I wish him a future of many wonderful concerts." In a 2018 TV documentary filmed in Iceland, Ashkenazy stated: "It is such a pleasure to play with him, to accompany him because he is so musical, so clear, and I can always understand what he wants to do with music -- that makes accompaniment sort of natural and, in a way, easy. He is so musical, so organic that it is very easy to accompany him. I am very pleased to accompany such a good artist."

Japanese composer Takayuki Hattori wrote: (Translated from Japanese) "The music of Nobuyuki Tsujii is guileless. There is no excessive decoration. He plays the piano with a minimum amount of flourish as required by God. He is one of a few in existence qualified to play the works dedicated to the God of Music by composers. He inspires courage to live and engenders food for thought. It is a pleasure to be alive in the same era as this rare pianist."

Japanese composer Joe Hisaishi, who teamed with Tsujii for the ending theme music of a 2018 film A Forest of Wool and Steel (Japanese: 羊と鋼の森), commented (Translated from Japanese) "Mr. Tsujii is a really wonderful pianist, especially the sense of rhythm is amazing. A neat rhythm without useless things."

In a 2022 concert review, Ivan Hewett of the U.K. newspaper The Daily Telegraph wrote: "Sceptics might suggest that both Tsujii's adoring fans and those usually hardened critics have been seduced by the overall 'miracle' and aren't really listening to the music-making. But they would be wrong, because Tsujii's playing is remarkable by any standards."

In a 2023 concert review, Marc Bridle wrote: "He sells out concerts because he brings quite an unusual gift to the performances he gives – interpretations which are entirely focused on the possibilities of sound and feeling; he almost reinvents the music he is playing. Blind since birth, he relies on everything else he has to turn in performances which are completely different from ones you would hear from other pianists... the phrasing was so clean – and it was delivered superbly...I had found the entire performance gripping

At a press conference held on April 22, 2024, Dr. Clemens Trautmann, President of Deutsche Grammophon commented: "I was captivated when I heard him [Tsujii] perform in London last year. He's a truly exciting musician, blessed with rare musical inventiveness and insight, which may also stem from the fact that he perceives the world differently. His playing goes straight to the heart, propelled by his phenomenal technique and the uncanny richness of sound he draws from the piano."

Conductor Eduardo Strasser said to Australian Broadcasting Corporation in October 2024: "It's a joy to work with Nobu. I cannot even call it work. (His) goal is sharing his passion for music and music alone. He doesn't speak much, and (there is) nothing to be said, because everything is through his music."

Critic Juan Carlos Tellechea wrote in 2026: "The space and definition that Nobuyuki Tsujii gives to each note infuse a simplicity that music, so often performed on this program, so desperately craves. Beyond his enormous rhythmic drive and mastery of dynamic control and contrast, it is this clarity and diaphanousness—in the attack and release of each note, as well as in the overall architecture of the pieces—that distinguishes this outstanding soloist."
