= Vasily Petrenko =

Russian-British conductor (born 1976)

Vasily Eduardovich Petrenko
- Васи́лий Эдуа́рдович Петре́нко
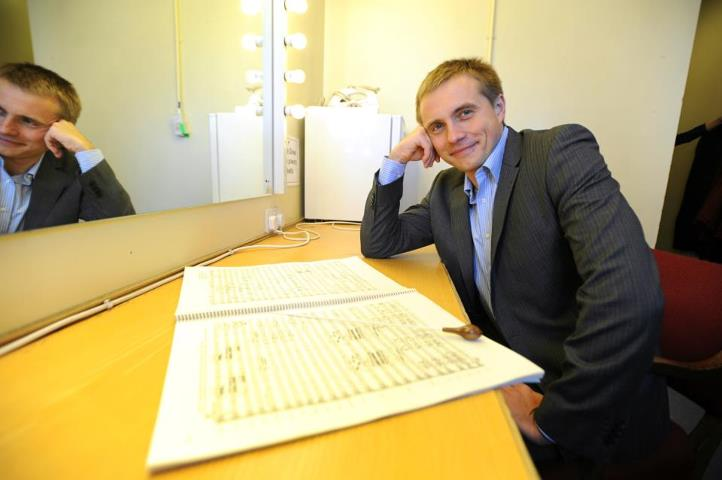
- Born: July 7, 1976 (age 50); Leningrad, Soviet Union
- Education: Capella Boys Music School, Saint Petersburg Conservatory
- Occupation: Conductor

Vasily Eduardovich Petrenko (Russian: Васи́лий Эдуа́рдович Петре́нко; born 7 July 1976) is a Russian-British conductor. He is currently music director of the Royal Philharmonic Orchestra.

== Biography ==
Of Russian and Ukrainian ancestry, Petrenko was born in Leningrad, USSR. He attended the Capella Boys Music School and the St Petersburg Conservatoire. Petrenko studied conducting principally under Ravil Martynov, also learning from Mariss Jansons, Yuri Temirkanov, and Esa-Pekka Salonen. He was resident conductor at the St. Petersburg Opera and Ballet Theatre from 1994 to 1997. He has served as chief conductor of the State Academy of St Petersburg since 1994. In 2002 he won the first prize of the Cadaqués Orchestra International Conducting Competition.

Petrenko made his conducting debut with the Royal Liverpool Philharmonic Orchestra (RLPO) in November 2004. After this appearance, in July 2005, he was named the RLPO's principal conductor, the youngest-ever conductor in the post, effective with the 2006–2007 season for an initial contract of three years. Since taking up the post, the orchestra's financial situation and attendance improved. He has also received critical praise for revitalising the orchestra, in Russian repertoire (especially Shostakovich) as well as standard repertoire such as Brahms, and in English music. In May 2007, the RLPO announced that Petrenko had extended his contract with the orchestra to 2012. In September 2009, the orchestra announced a further extension of his contract to 2015, with a change of Petrenko's title to Chief Conductor. In March 2013, the RLPO announced the conversion of Petrenko's contract into an extended open-ended agreement with no specific scheduled time of conclusion, and where Petrenko is to give an advance notice of 3 years of when he wishes to conclude his tenure. His first conducting appearance at The Proms was with the RLPO in August 2008. Petrenko and the RLPO have recorded several compact discs for Naxos. Petrenko's recording of Tchaikovsky's Manfred Symphony won the Gramophone orchestral recording of the year in 2009.

In April 2007, Petrenko was one of eight conductors of British orchestras to endorse the 10-year classical music outreach manifesto, "Building on Excellence: Orchestras for the 21st Century", to increase the presence of classical music in the UK, including giving free entry to all British schoolchildren to a classical music concert. From December 2008 to 2013 Petrenko served as principal conductor of the National Youth Orchestra of Great Britain, conducting his first concert with them at the 2009 BBC Proms.

Petrenko first conducted the Oslo Philharmonic Orchestra in December 2009. In February 2011, the Oslo Philharmonic announced the appointment of Petrenko as its next chief conductor, as of the 2013–2014 season, with an initial contract of 4 years. His initial Oslo contract called for seven weeks of appearances in his first seasons and ten weeks of appearances in subsequent seasons.

In August 2013, comments attributed to Petrenko in a Norwegian newspaper that appeared to denigrate female conductors caused controversy, including calls for his resignation from the RLPO. Petrenko subsequently apologised for how some people chose to construe his remarks, and stated that his comments were in specific reference to the situation for conductors in Russia, rather than female conductors in general. He also indicated that part of the controversy was due to the fact that the interview was conducted in English, rather than Norwegian. Petrenko also subsequently stated publicly:

"I'd encourage any girl to study conducting. How successful they turn out to be depends on their talent and their work, definitely not their gender."

In November 2015, Petrenko's Oslo contract was extended through 2020. In October 2019, the orchestra announced the scheduled conclusion of Petrenko's Oslo tenure at the close of the 2019–2020 season. Petrenko stood down as chief conductor of the Oslo Philharmonic at the close of the 2019–2020 season.

Petrenko first guest-conducted the Royal Philharmonic Orchestra (RPO) in March 2016. He returned for a subsequent guest-conducting engagement in April 2017. In July 2018, the RPO announced the appointment of Petrenko as its new music director, effective with the 2021–2022 season, with an initial contract of five years. He held the title of music director-designate for the 2020–2021 season. Petrenko concluded his RLPO chief conductorship at the close of the 2020–2021 season, and subsequently took the title of conductor laureate with the RLPO. In April 2024, the RPO announced the extension of Petrenko's contract as its music director through the 2029–2030 season.

Petrenko was chief conductor of the European Union Youth Orchestra from 2015 to 2024. Petrenko became principal guest conductor of the State Academic Symphony Orchestra of the Russian Federation in 2016. In January 2021, the orchestra announced the appointment of Petrenko as its next principal conductor, effective 1 September 2021. In response to the 2022 Russian invasion of Ukraine, Petrenko suspended his work with the orchestra, stating:

"In response to these terrible events, I have decided to suspend my work in Russia... until peace has been restored."

Later in 2022, under duress from the Russian Ministry of Culture, Petrenko submitted a letter of resignation from the orchestra.

== Personal life ==
Petrenko and his wife Evgenia Chernysheva-Petrenko, who is herself a conductor, have two children, Alexander (Sasha) and Anya. He is a football aficionado and follower of the club FC Zenit Saint Petersburg and Liverpool F.C. In March 2009, Petrenko was awarded an honorary professorship and Doctor of Letters degree from Liverpool Hope University. In April 2009, Petrenko was made an 'Honorary Scouser' by the Lord Mayor of Liverpool. He became a British citizen in 2015. In November 2016, the city of Liverpool made Petrenko a new Citizen of Honour. Petrenko and his family currently reside in London.

== Discography ==
Alpha Classics

- Prokofiev: Piano Concerto No. 2; Shor: Piano Concerto; Behzod Abduriamov (2025)

Avie Records

- Tchaikovsky: Ballet Music (from Swan Lake, The Sleeping Beauty, and The Nutcracker) (2008)
- Wolf-Ferrari: Il segreto di Susanna; Serenata; Marc Canturri, baritone; Anna Tilbrook, piano (2010)
- Rachmaninov: Piano Concertos Nos. 1–4, Rhapsody on a Theme of Paganini; Simon Trpčeski, piano (2010, 2011)
- Rachmaninov: Symphonic Dances / The Isle of the Dead / The Rock (2011)

Decca

- Tchaikovsky: Violin Concerto; Christian Li, violin (2025)

Deutsche Grammophon (DG)

- Ravel: Tzigane; Saint-Saens: Introduction and Rondo Capriccioso; Sarasate: Zigeunerwiesen; Nicola Benedetti, violin (2009)
- Jennifer Higdon: Violin Concerto, Tchaikovsky: Violin Concerto; Hilary Hahn, violin (2010)
- Barber: Violin Concerto; Bruch: Violin Concerto; Esther Yoo, violin (2023)
- Rachmaninov: Piano Concerto No. 2; Kapustin: 8 Concert Etudes; Nobuyuki Tsujii (2025)
- Grieg: Piano Concerto; Rachmaninov: Paganini Rhapsody; Nobuyuki Tsujii, piano (2025)

Ecstatic Records

- Torke: Concerto for Orchestra (2015)

EMI Classics

- Tavener: Requiem (2009)
- Rachmaninov: Symphony No. 2, Dances from Aleko (2012)
- Rachmaninov: Symphony No. 3, Caprice Bohemien, Vocalise. (2012)
- Rachmaninov: Symphony No. 1, Prince Rostislav (2013)

es Dur

- Gliere: Concerto for Harp and Orchestra; Anaelle Tourret, harp (2025)

LAWO Classics

- Scriabin: Symphonies Nos. 3 & 4 Le Poème de l'extase (2015)
- Prokofiev: Romeo and Juliet (2016)
- Scriabin: Symphony No. 2, Piano Concerto; Kirill Gershtein, piano (2017)
- Scriabin: Symphony No. 1, Prometheus (The Poem of Fire) (2018)
- Strauss: Also sprach Zarathustra; Ein Heldenleben (2019)
- Strauss: Don Quixote, Don Juan, Till Eulenspiegel (2019)
- Strauss: Eine Alpensinfonie, Tod und Verklarung (2020)
- Rimsky-Korsakov: Capriccio Espagnol, Russian Eastern Festival Overture, and Scheherazade (2020)
- Prokofiev: Symphony No. 5; Myaskovsky: Symphony No. 21 (2020)
- Prokofiev: Symphony No. 6; Myaskovsky: Symphony No. 27 (2021)

Liverpool Philharmonic

- Offenbach: Un Mari à la porte (2008)

LPO Classics

- Tchaikovsky: Violin Concerto (2017)

Mercury Classics

- Horner: Pas de Deux (2015)

Naxos Records

- Liszt: Piano Concertos Nos. 1 & 2, Totentanz (2008)
- Tchaikovsky: Manfred Symphony / The Voyevoda (2008)
- Shostakovich: Symphony No. 11 (2009)
- Shostakovich: Symphonies Nos. 5 & 9 (2009)
- Shostakovich: Symphony No. 10 (2010)
- Shostakovich: Symphony No. 8 (2010)
- Shostakovich: Symphonies Nos. 6 & 12 (2011)
- Shostakovich: Symphonies Nos. 1 & 3 (2011)
- Shostakovich: Symphonies Nos. 2 & 15 (2012)
- Shostakovich: Symphony No. 7 (2013)
- Shostakovich: Symphony No. 4 (2013)
- Shostakovich: Symphony No. 14 (2014)
- Shostakovich: Symphony No. 13 (2014)
- Shostakovich: The Complete Symphonies (2015)
- Shostakovich: Piano Concertos Nos. 1 & 2; Boris Giltburg, piano (2017)
- Beethoven: Piano Concertos Nos. 1 & 2; Rondo, WoO6; Boris Giltburg, piano (2019)
- Beethoven: Piano Concertos No. 5 'Emperor'; Piano Concerto No. 0, Wo04; Boris Giltburg, piano (2022)
- Beethoven: Piano Concertos Nos. 3 & 4; Boris Giltburg, piano (2023)

Ondine Records

- Shostakovich: Cello Concertos Nos. 1 & 2; Truls Mørk, cello (2016)

Onyx Classics

- Tchaikovsky: Piano Concertos Nos. 1 & 2; Simon Trpčeski, piano (2014)
- Elgar: Symphony No. 1, Cockaigne Overture (2015)
- Tchaikovsky: Symphony Nos. 1, 2, and 5 (2016)
- Elgar: Symphony No. 2, Carissima, Mina, Chanson de Matin (2017)
- Tchaikovsky: Symphony Nos. 3, 4, and 6, Pathetique (2017)
- Prokofiev: Piano Concertos Nos. 1 & 3, Overture on Hebrew Themes; Simon Trpčeski, piano (2017)
- Stravinsky: Le Sacre du printemps; Rachmaninov: Spring; Debussy: Printemps (2017)
- Stravinsky: L'Oiseau de feu; Rimsky-Korsakov: Le Coq d'or (2018)
- Elgar: Enigma Variations, In the South, Serenade for Strings (2019)
- Mussorgsky: Pictures at an Exhibition; Khachaturian: Spartacus Suite (2019)
- Elgar: Sea Pictures, The Music Makers (2020)
- Stravinsky: Petrushka (1911 version) (2020)
- Zemlinsky: Die Seejungfrau; Schreker: Der Guburtstag der Infantine (2021)
- Britten: Young Person's Guide to the Orchestra (Variations and Fugue on a Theme by Purcell), (2021)

Orfeo

- Szymanowski: Violin Concertos Nos. 1 & 2, Myths; Baiba Skride, violin (2016)

Pentatone

- Prokofiev: Violin Concertos Nos. 1 & 2; Arabella Steinbacher, violin (2012

Rubicon

- Wolf-Ferrari: I Quatro Rusteghi (2018)

Sony Classical

- Guinovart: Piano Concertos Nos. 1 & 2, Valses Poéticos; Albert Guinovart, piano (2014)

Tritó Records

- Albéniz: 'Poèmes d'amour'; Isabelle Bres, rhapsodist (2008)
- Guinovart: La vida secreta; Morera: Cancons de carrer; Tchaikovsky: Suite No. 4 'Mozariana' (2023, recorded live in 2006)

Virgin

- Rachmaninov: Vocalise, Op. 34, No. 14 (arr. for orchestra) (2012) (on a compilation disc called "Classical 2013")

Warner Classics

- Prokofiev: Peter and the Wolf; Saint-Saens: Le carnaval des animaux; Rawthorne: Practical Cats (2017)
- Tchaikovsky: Piano Concerto No. 1. Liszt: Les Jeux d'eaux à la Villa d'Este, Sonetto 104 del Petrarca, Réminiscences de Don Juan. George Li, piano. LPO (2019)

Cultural offices
| Preceded by Vladimir Ashkenazy (music director) | Chief Conductor, European Union Youth Orchestra; 2015–2024 | Succeeded by Iván Fischer (music director) |
| Preceded by Vladimir Jurowski | Principal Conductor, State Academic Symphony Orchestra of the Russian Federation; 2021–2022 | Succeeded by (post vacant) |
