= Sony Building =

Sony Building may refer to:

- Sony Building (New York)
- Sony Building (Tokyo)
