= Okayama Symphony Hall =

Concert hall in Okayama, Japan

Okayama Symphony Hall 岡山シンフォニーホール
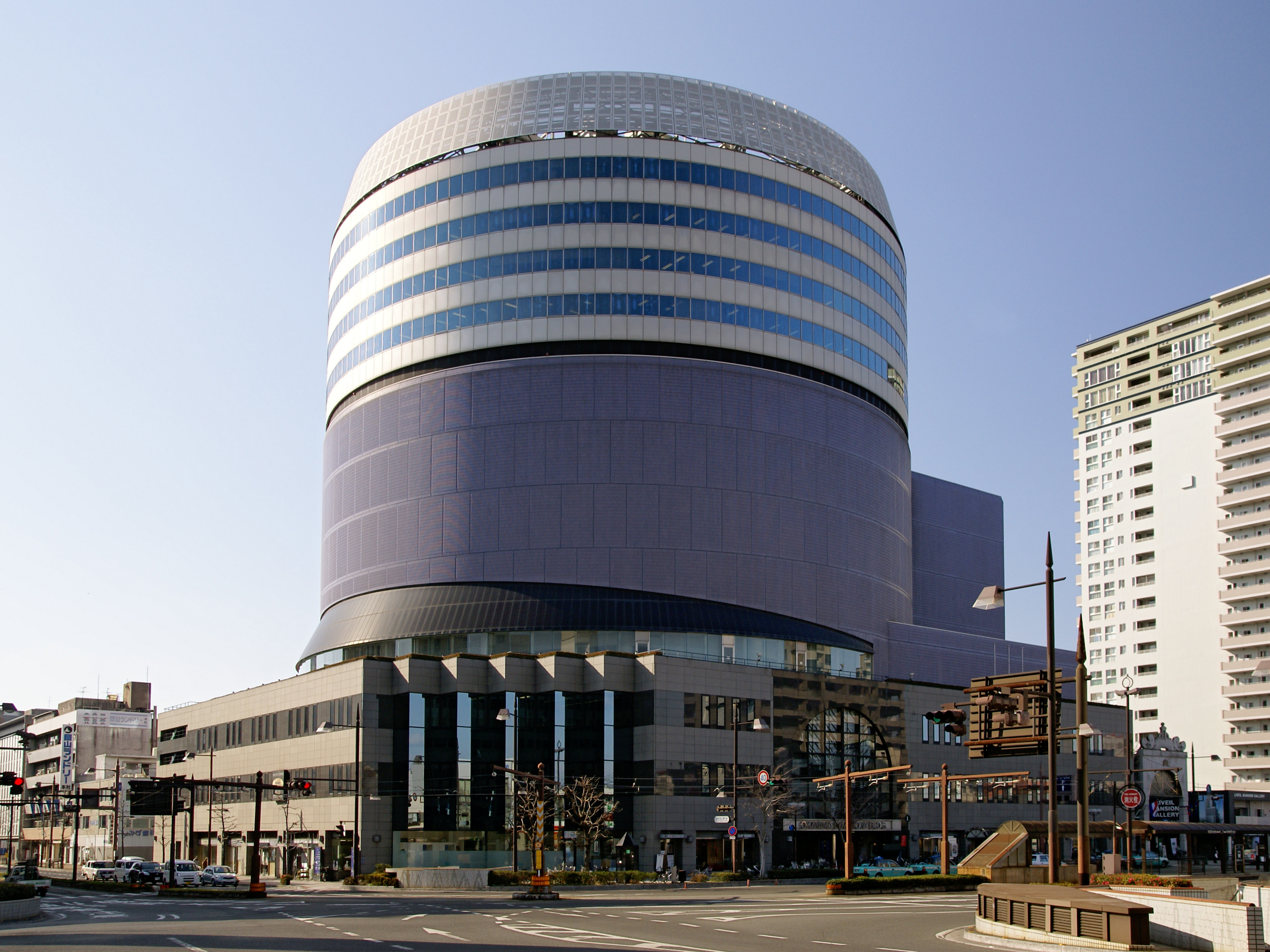

General information
- Location: 1-5-1 Omote-chō, Kita-ku, Okayama, Japan
- Coordinates: 34°39′55″N 133°55′47″E
- Opened: September 23, 1991
- Cost: ¥5,700 million
- Owner: Okayama City

Technical details
- Floor area: 33,642 m^{2}

Design and construction
- Architect: Yoshinobu Ashihara
- Other designers: Nagata Acoustics

Website
- www.okayama-symphonyhall.or.jp

References
- Factsheet

Okayama Symphony Hall (岡山シンフォニーホール, Okayama Shinfonī Hōlu) is a concert hall in Okayama, Japan. It opened in fall 1991 and seats over 2,000 audience members. Yoshinobu Ashihara was the architect, with acoustical design by Nagata Acoustics.

== See also ==
- Shoebox style
