= Ueno Gakuen University =

University in Japan

Coordinates: 35°42′54.4″N 139°46′54.6″E

Ueno Gakuen University (上野学園大学, Ueno gakuen daigaku) is a private university in Taito, Tokyo, Japan, specialising in music. It was established in 1958. Its predecessor was a school for young women founded in 1904.

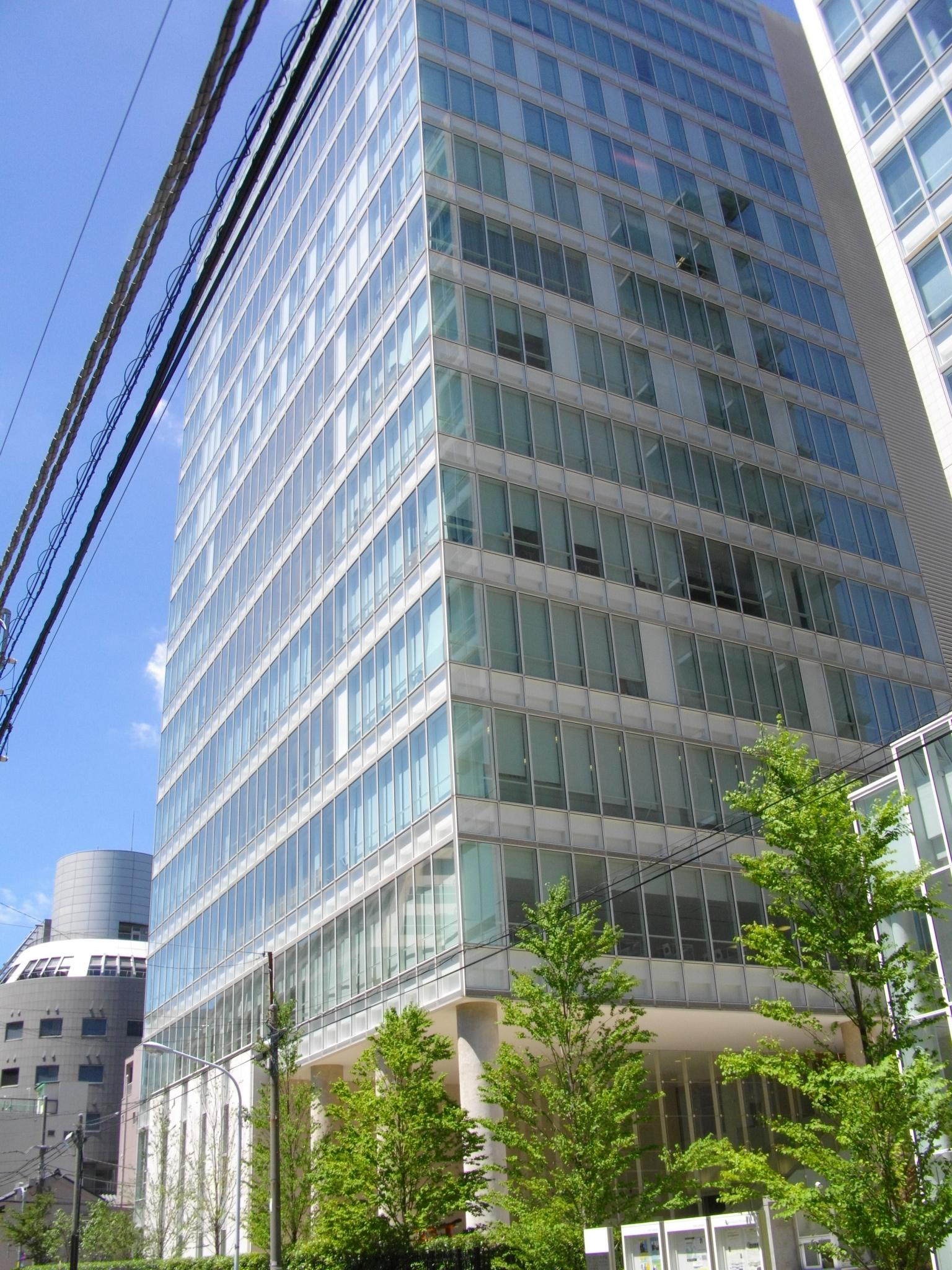
Ueno Gakuen University building

One of the university's most prominent alumni is pianist Nobuyuki Tsujii, gold medalist of the 2009 Thirteenth Van Cliburn International Piano Competition. Tsujii entered the university's Performance Program in April 2007, and graduated in March, 2011.
