= Yoshinobu Ashihara =

Japanese architect (1918–2003)

- 芦原 義信
- Born: 7 July 1918; Tokyo
- Died: 24 September 2003 (aged 85); Tokyo
- Education: University of Tokyo
- Occupation: Architect
- Known for: Sony Building, Komazawa Gymnasium

Yoshinobu Ashihara (芦原 義信, Ashihara Yoshinobu; 7 July 1918 – 24 September 2003) was a Japanese architect noted for projects such as the Komazawa Olympic Gymnasium (1964) and the Sony Building (1966).

== Education and career ==
Ashihara was educated at both the University of Tokyo and Harvard University. After graduating from Harvard in 1953 with a master's degree in Architecture, Ashihara worked in the architectural practice of modernist Marcel Breuer. Founder of his own firm Yoshinobu Ashihara Architecture Associates in 1956.

In the later stages of his career, he was appointed Professor of Architecture at the University of Tokyo. President of the Japan Institute of Architects from 1980 - 1982 and the Architectural Institute of Japan from 1985 - 1987.

He was the recipient of both the Order of the Sacred Treasure and the Order of Culture.

== Projects ==
Project	Date	Location	Image
Komazawa Olympic Gymnasium and Control Tower	1964	Setagaya, Tokyo	
Atelier, Musashino Art University	1964	Kodaira, Tokyo	
Sony Building	1966	Ginza, Chūō, Tokyo	
Fuji Film Building	1969	Minato, Tokyo	
National Museum of Japanese History	1980	Sakura, Chiba	
Headquarters, Daiichi Kangyō Bank	1981	Chiyoda, Tokyo	
Gotenshita Memorial Arena, University of Tokyo	1989	Hongō, Bunkyō, Tokyo	
Tokyo Metropolitan Theatre	1990	Toshima, Tokyo	
Okayama Symphony Hall	1991	Okayama, Okayama	
Film Centre, National Museum of Modern Art, Tokyo	1994	Chiyoda, Tokyo	
Ishikawa Ongakudō	2001	Kanazawa, Ishikawa	

== Publications ==
Ashihara published a large number of architecture focused studies and texts, most prominent being The Aesthetic Townscape (Japanese first edition 1979 and English translation in 1983) and the Hidden Order: Tokyo through the Twentieth Century (Japanese first edition 1986, English translation in 1989).

== See also ==
- List of Important Cultural Properties of Japan (Shōwa period: structures)
