= Komazawa Gymnasium =

Arena in Tokyo, Japan

- Komazawa Gymnasium
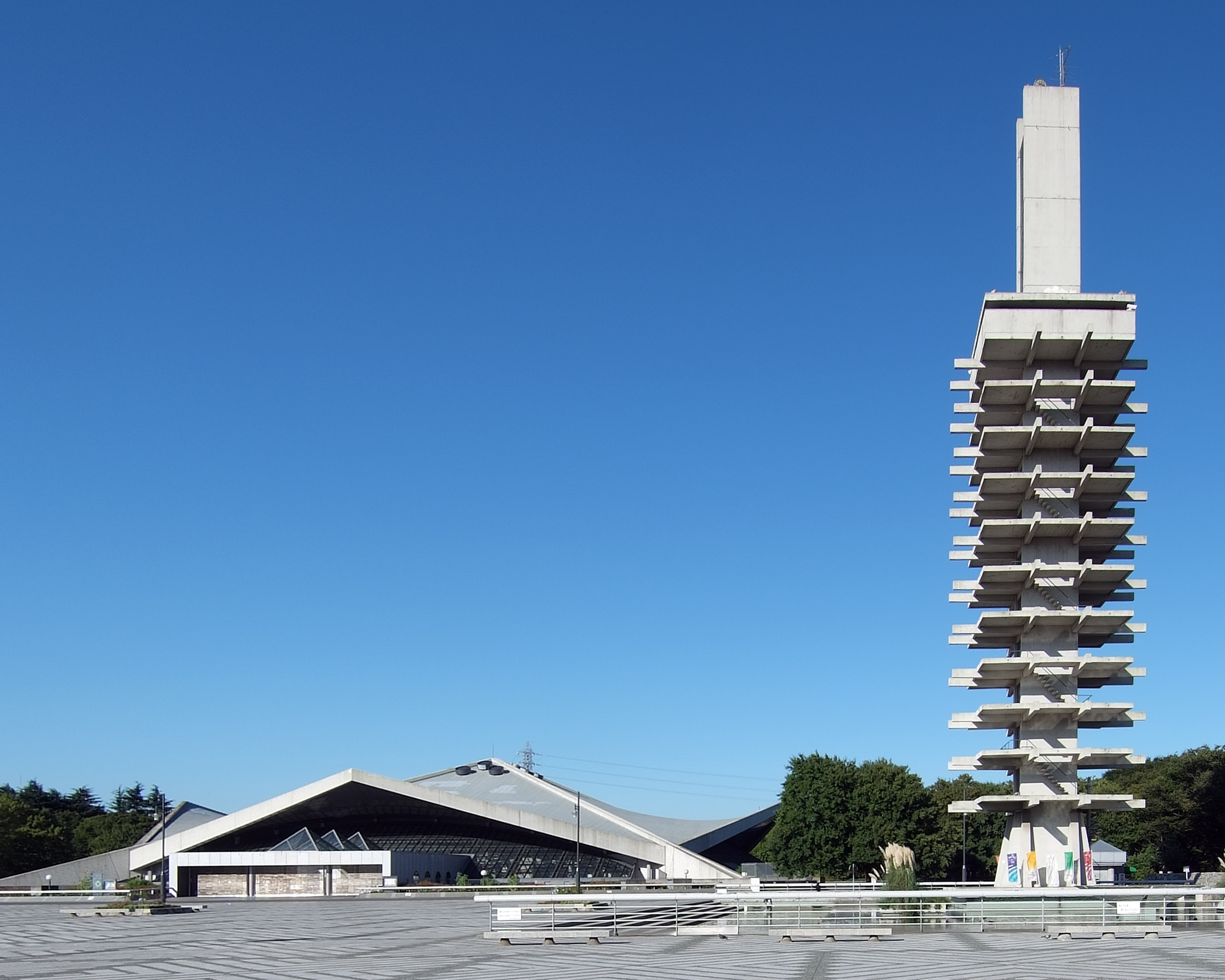

- Location within Tokyo Location within Japan
- Interactive map of Komazawa Gymnasium
- Full name: Komazawa Gymnasium
- Location: Tokyo, Japan
- Coordinates: 35.624825°N 139.660758°E
- Owner: Tokyo
- Operator: Tokyo Sport Benefits Corporation
- Capacity: 3,875

Construction
- Groundbreaking: August 1962
- Opened: March 1964
- Architect: Yoshinobu Ashihara
- General contractor: Kajima Construction

Tenant
- Alvark Tokyo (2017-)

Komazawa Gymnasium (駒沢オリンピック公園総合運動場体育館) is an indoor sporting arena located in Komazawa Olympic Park, Tokyo, Japan. The capacity of the arena is 3,875 spectators.

Designed by Japanese architect Yoshinobu Ashihara, along with the landmark Control Tower, that features as a focal point of the park, the gymnasium venue hosted the wrestling events at the 1964 Summer Olympics.

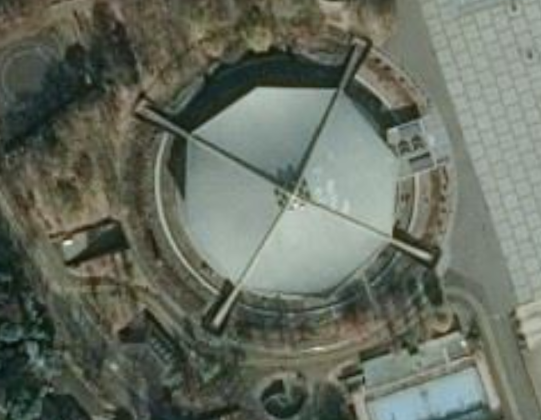
Satellite view
