= Longwood Symphony Orchestra =

Volunteer orchestra based in Boston

- Short name: LSO
- Founded: 1982
- Location: Boston, Massachusetts
- Principal conductor: Jotaro Nakano
- Website: longwoodsymphony.org

The Longwood Symphony Orchestra is a volunteer non-profit orchestra based in Boston, Massachusetts, composed of medical professionals. Their concerts act as fundraisers for health-related non-profit organizations. It was founded in 1982 by members of the Harvard Medical School. They perform four concerts a year in Jordan Hall at the New England Conservatory, plus a summer outdoor concert at the Hatch Shell. The current music director and conductor is Jotaro Nakano. The orchestra has been profiled in the Wall Street Journal, the Boston Globe, and the Boston Herald. In June 2007, the Longwood Symphony Orchestra accepted the 2007 MetLife Award for Excellence in Community Engagement from the American Symphony Orchestra League.
