= Ishikawa Ongakudō =

Building in Ishikawa Prefecture, Japan

Ishikawa Ongakudō 石川県立音楽堂
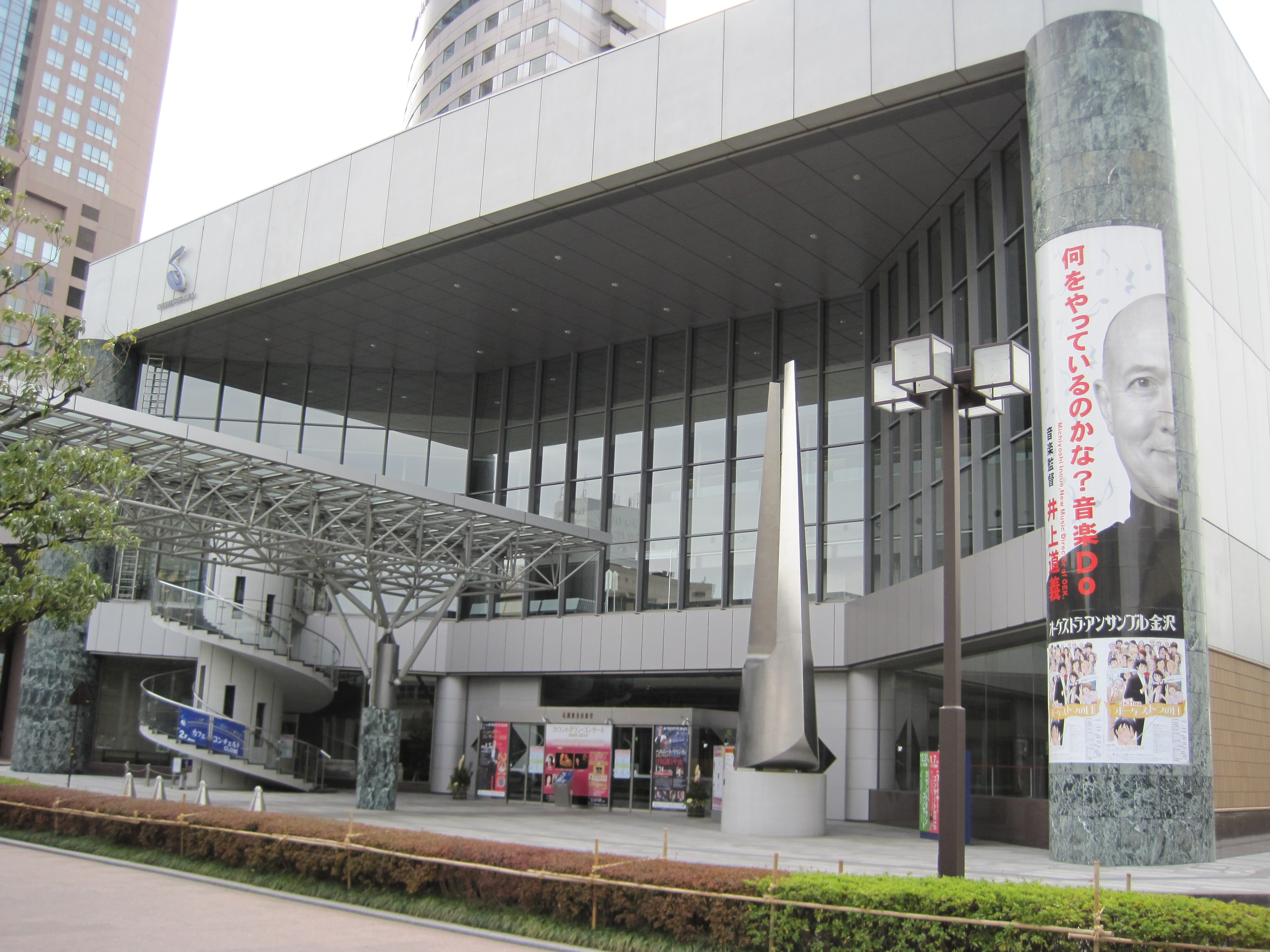
- Alternative names: Ishikawa Prefectural Concert Hall

General information
- Location: 620, Shōwa-chō, Kanazawa, Ishikawa, Japan
- Coordinates: 36°34′36″N 136°38′52″E
- Completed: 2001
- Cost: ¥ 25 billion
- Owner: Ishikawa Prefecture

Technical details
- Floor area: 29,754 m^{2}

Design and construction
- Architect: Yoshinobu Ashihara
- Other designers: Nagata Acoustics

Website
- Hompepage

References
- Factsheet

Ishikawa Ongakudō (石川県立音楽堂, Ishikawa kenritsu ongakudō) is a concert hall in Kanazawa, Ishikawa Prefecture, Japan. It opened in 2001 and has two principal performances spaces: the shoebox-style Concert Hall, which seats 1,560; and the Hōgaku Hall, with a capacity of 720, for traditional Japanese music, kabuki, and bunraku. The walls of the main auditorium are finished with urushi. Yoshinobu Ashihara was the architect with acoustic design by Nagata Acoustics, who trialled their concept with a 1:10 scale model. The organ, with sixty-nine stops, is by the Karl Schuke company. Orchestra Ensemble Kanazawa is the resident orchestra.

== See also ==
- Kanazawa Station
- Orchestra Ensemble Kanazawa
