= Boris Giltburg =

Israeli classical pianist (born 1984)

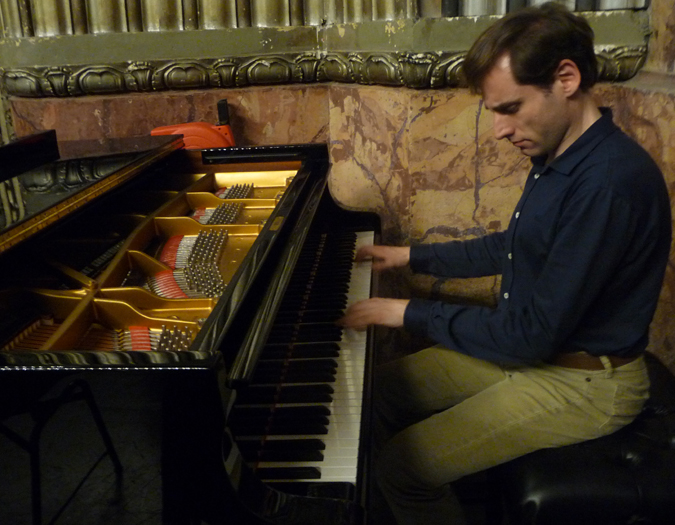
Giltburg in 2019

Boris Leonidovich Giltburg (Hebrew: בוריס גילטבורג; born 21 June 1984) is an Israeli classical pianist, born in the Soviet Union.

== Biography ==
Giltburg was born into a Jewish family in Moscow, then the capital of the Soviet Union, and began studying piano with his mother at the age of five. After emigrating to Israel, he studied with Arie Vardi between 1995 and 2007.

== Music career ==
At 13 years old, prodigy Boris Giltburg won the 1997 Newport International Piano Competition.

In 2002, Giltburg won 2nd prize (the top prize awarded) of the Paloma O'Shea Santander International Piano Competition in Spain, where he performed the Bartók Third Piano Concerto with the London Symphony Orchestra. Since then Giltburg has performed with the Philharmonia Orchestra, Royal Liverpool Philharmonic, Bournemouth Symphony, City of Birmingham Symphony Orchestra, Frankfurt Radio Symphony, and the Israel Philharmonic with conductors such as Philippe Entremont, Christoph von Dohnányi, Mikhail Pletnev and Marin Alsop.

He won 2nd place at the 2011 Arthur Rubinstein International Piano Master Competition.

On 2 June 2013, he won the international Queen Elisabeth Piano Competition in Brussels.
