= Ginza Sony Park =

Building in Tokyo, property of Sony

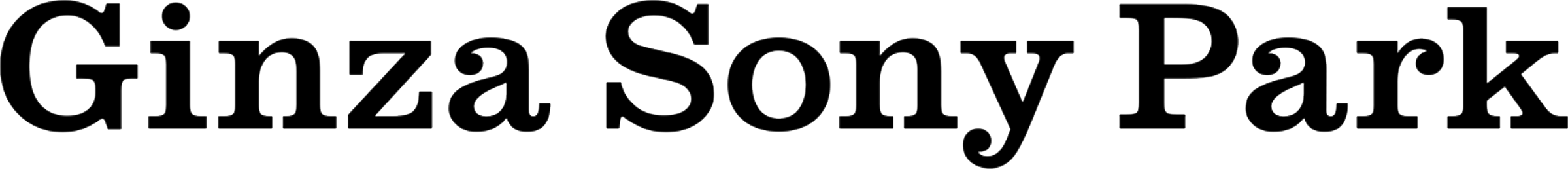

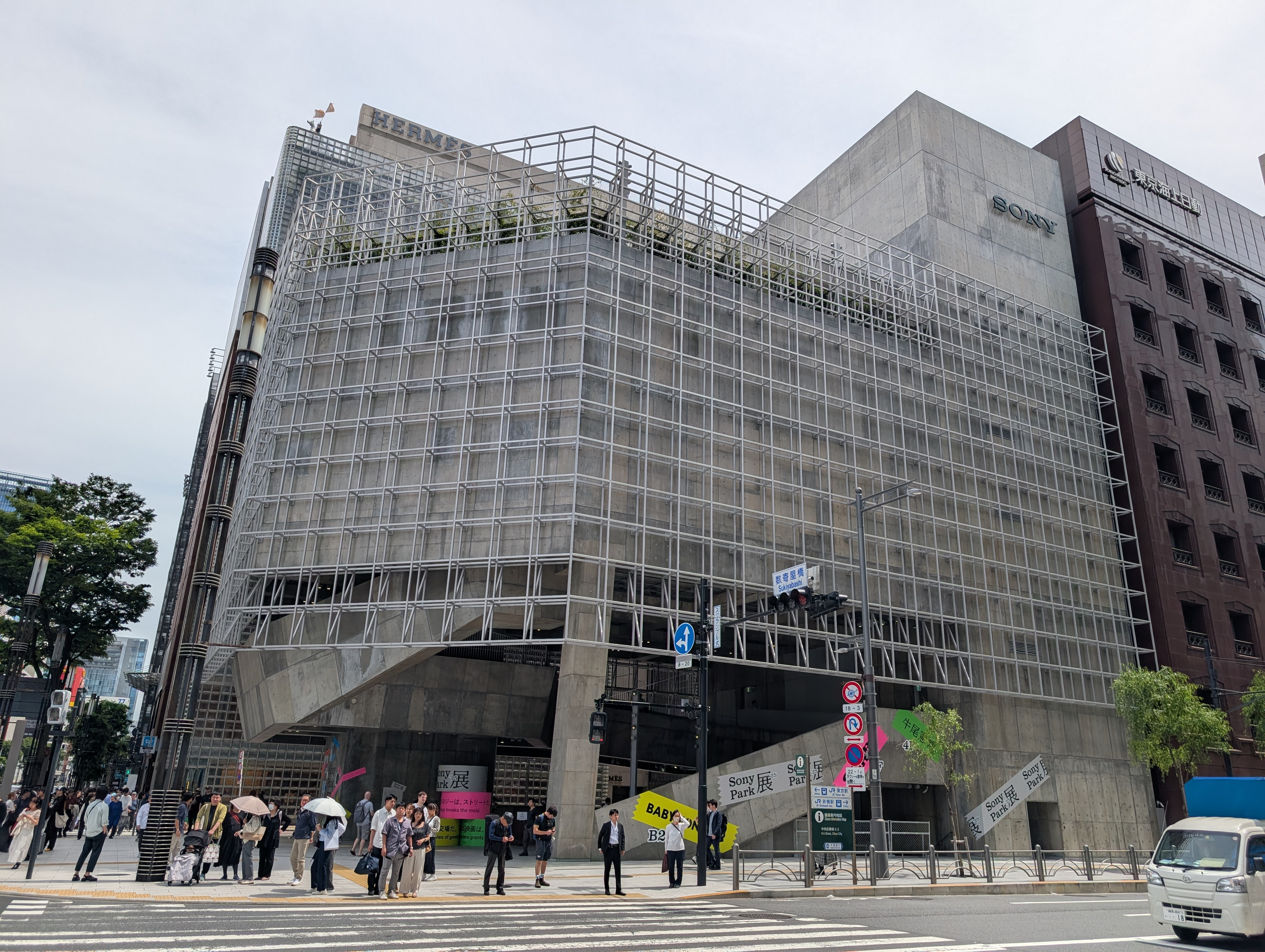

General information
- Type: Public park and exhibition center
- Location: Ginza, Chūō, Tokyo, Japan, 5-chōme-3-1 Ginza, Chūō City, Tokyo 104-0061, Japan
- Coordinates: 35.6721°N 139.7631°E
- Construction started: 2021
- Completed: August 15, 2024
- Opening: January 26, 2025
- Owner: Sony

Height
- Height: 33.8 m / 111 ft

Technical details
- Floor count: 5 above ground, 3 basement levels

Design and construction
- Architect: Daisuke Nagano
- Known for: Former site of the iconic Sony Building

Website
- Official website

The Ginza Sony Park, formerly known as the Sony Building, is an architectural landmark and public space built by Sony, located in Tokyo's Ginza district (Chūō-ku). Originally opened in 1966 and designed by Yoshinobu Ashihara, the iconic structure was demolished in 2017 to undergo a multi-phase transformation into an innovative multi-story urban park, culminating in the opening of its permanent new facility in January 2025.

The facility functions as a public gathering space, cultural venue, and multi-purpose urban park. Across its eight levels, the building contains flexible gallery areas for temporary art, technology, and media exhibitions, as well as dedicated event spaces for live performances, workshops, and product displays. Public lounge areas with free seating are distributed throughout the interior for visitors to rest, socialize, or work, while the lower basement levels house casual dining options, cafes, and direct access to nearby transit lines.

== History ==
=== Sony Building (1966–2017) ===
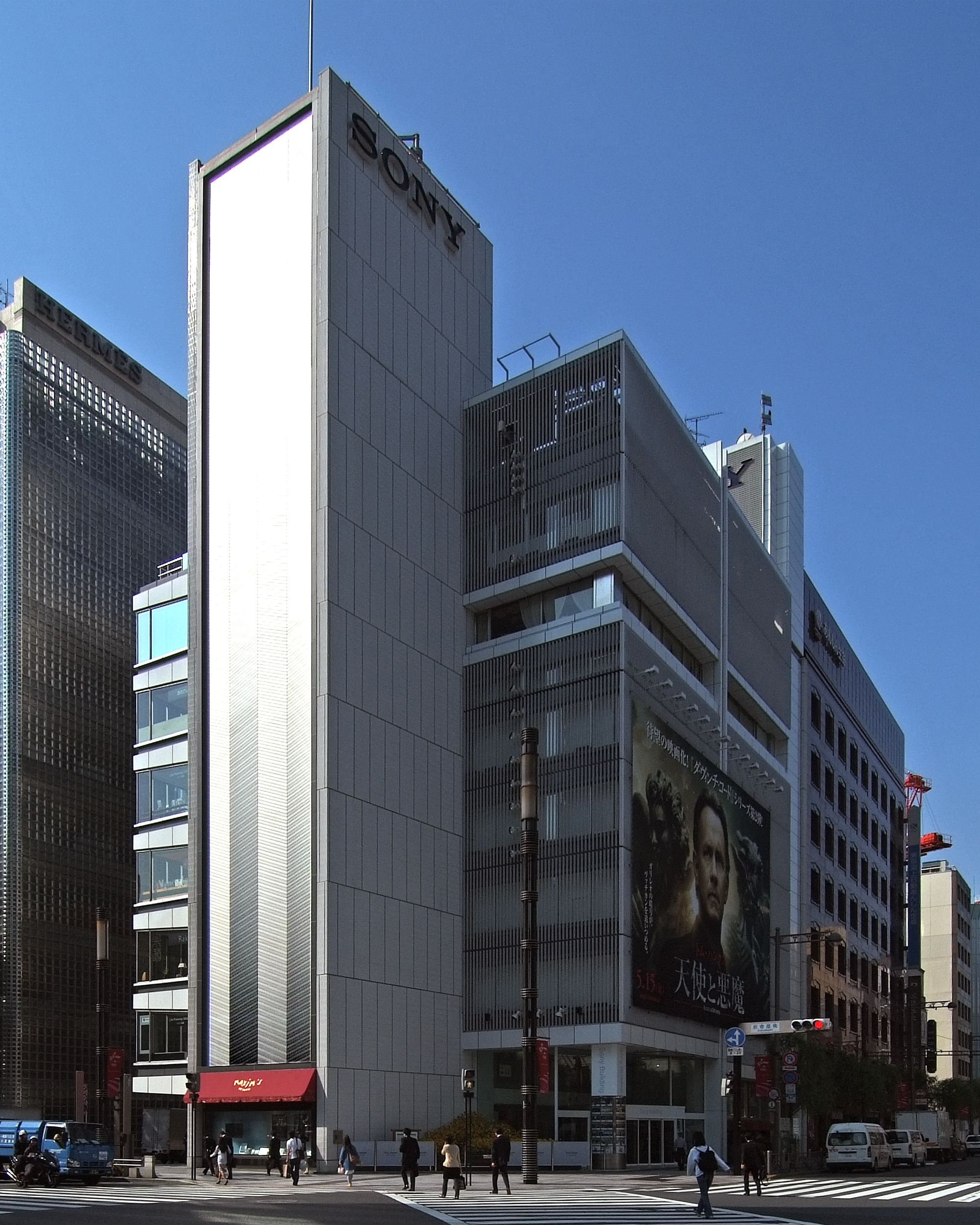
The Sony Building before demolition

Designed by Japanese architect Yoshinobu Ashihara, the original Sony Building opened on April 29, 1966, under the vision of Sony co-founder Akio Morita. Rather than maximizing commercial office space, Morita envisioned a high-profile corporate flagship that would showcase Sony's rapidly expanding consumer electronics line and act as a public gateway to the brand.

The building was widely recognized for its innovative architectural features, including a continuous split-level showroom that wound upward in quarter-floor increments, elevated by 90 cm (35 in) across each section, around a central core. At the base, Morita reserved a 33-square-meter open corner plaza dubbed "Sony Square" to serve as a public gathering space at the Sukiyabashi intersection. Its original exterior façade featured a groundbreaking illumination display powered by 2,300 individual 5-inch cathode-ray tubes. Over its 51-year history, the facility welcomed roughly 5.5 million visitors annually.

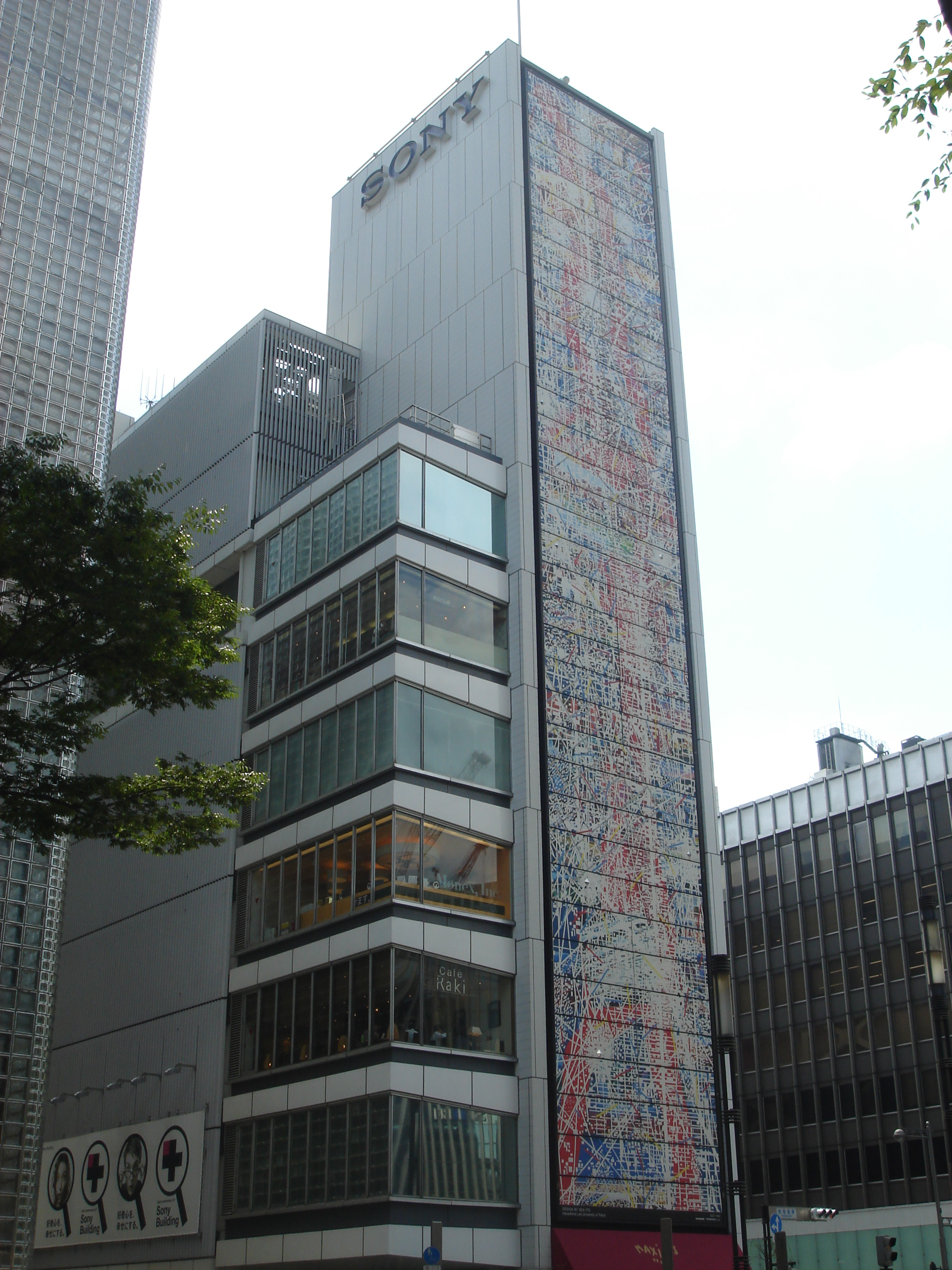
The Sony Building's exterior art wall, which regularly displayed changing public artwork

A major renovation was completed in 1992, restoring the exterior to its original condition. Exterior louvers and tiles were replaced, new entrance doors were installed, and the public plaza was updated. The CRT display façade was replaced with 74 custom aluminum panels used as a regularly changing feature art wall, and extensive interior renovations were carried out simultaneously.

After half a century of operation, the original Sony Building officially closed on March 31, 2017, and was demolished later that year to make way for the multi-stage Ginza Sony Park Project. Under the leadership of Sony Enterprise president Daisuke Nagano, the site was intentionally left open as a flat, ground-level urban park from August 2018 through late 2021. Designed to provide rare open public space in central Tokyo, this temporary park hosted experimental pop-ups, food stalls, and public installations, attracting over 8.5 million visitors through the Tokyo 2020 Olympic and Paralympic Games period.

Construction on the permanent replacement structure began in late 2021 and concluded on August 15, 2024. Designed in-house by Sony as a vertical park, the new building opened to the public on January 26, 2025, hosting the inaugural Sony Park Exhibition 2025.

== Ginza Sony Park ==
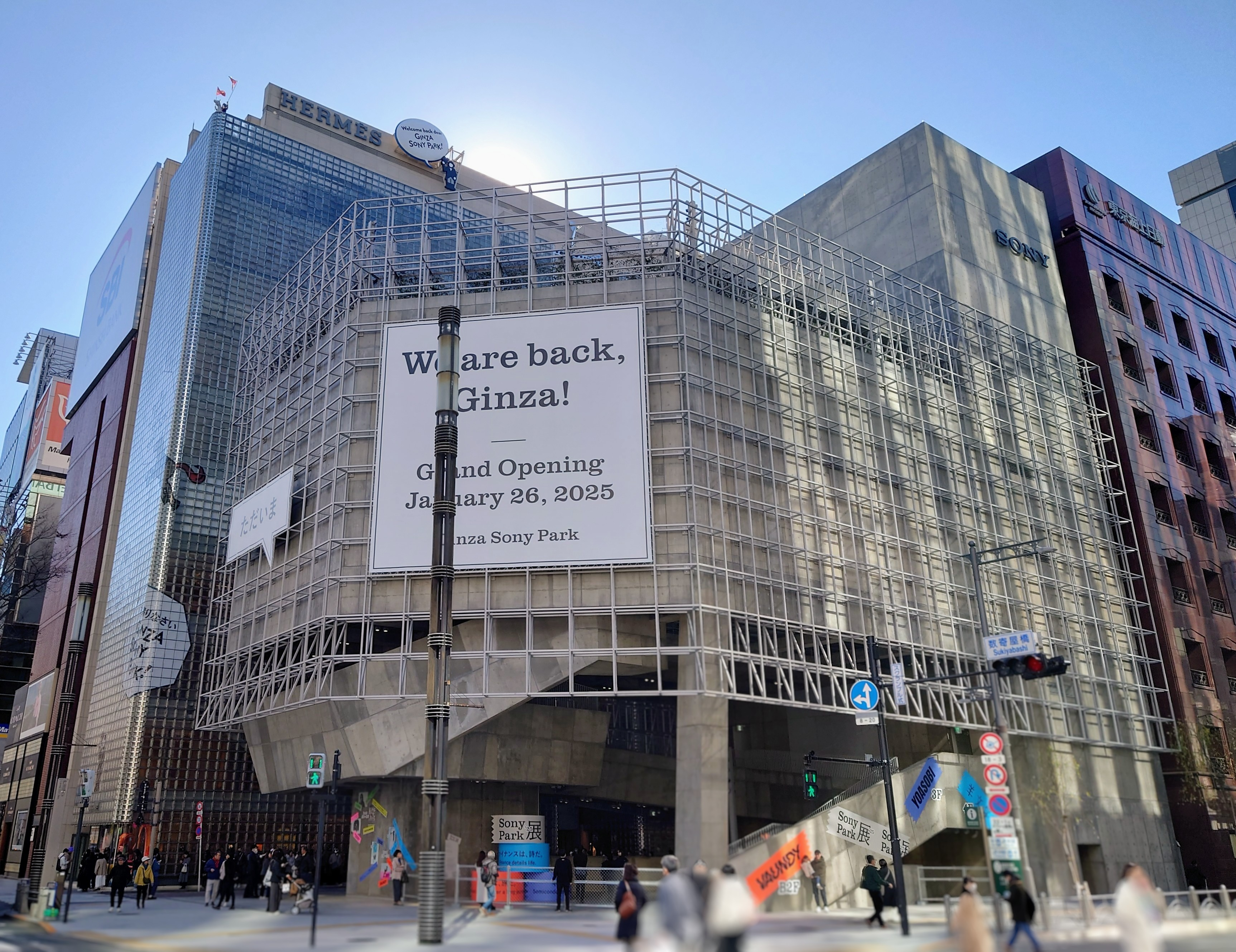
Ginza Sony Park in 2025

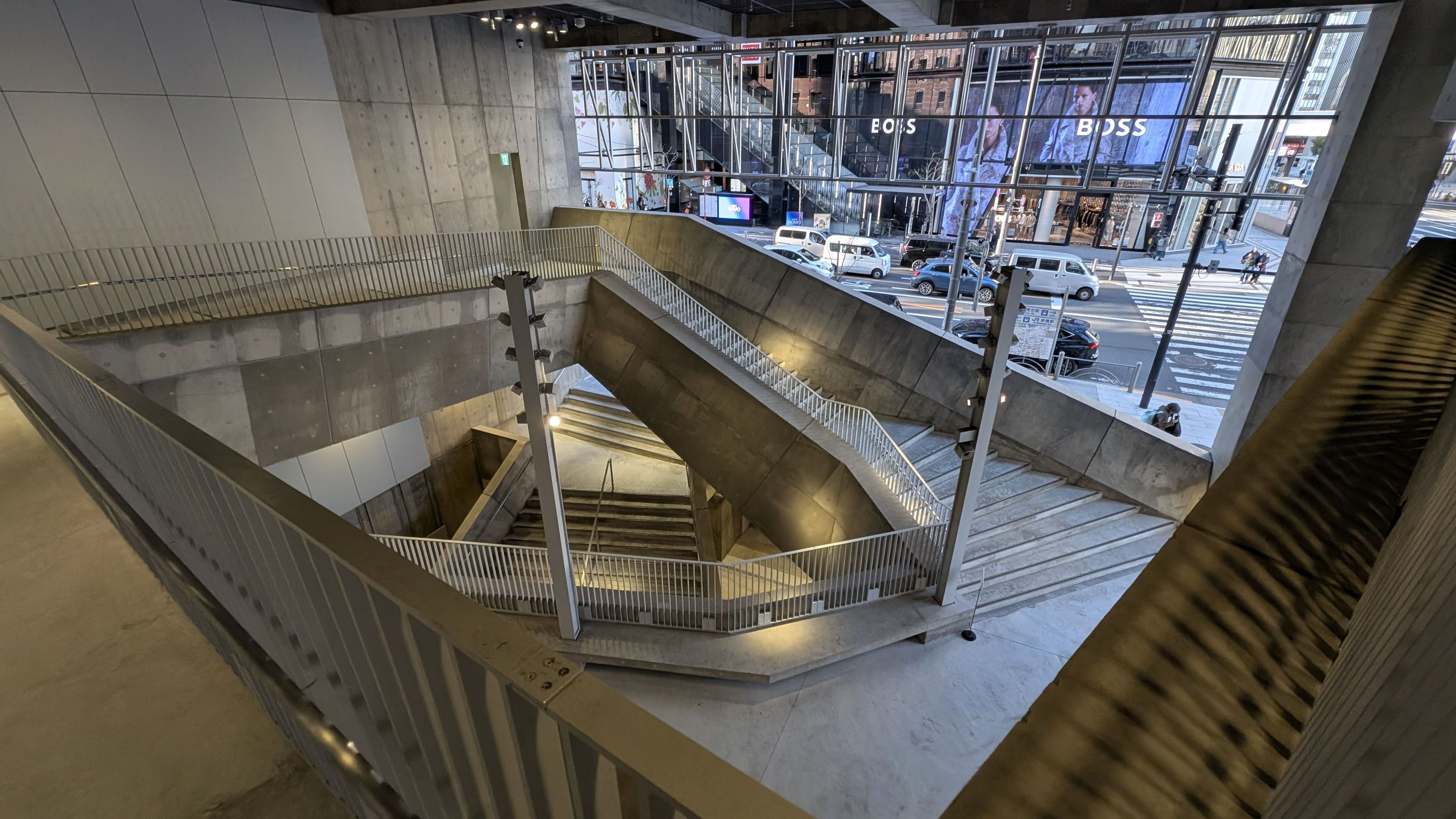
Central spiral staircase

The redeveloped Ginza Sony Park structure spans eight levels (five floors above ground and three basement floors) and covers over 4,000 square meters. Designed in-house by Sony's internal project team led by Daisuke Nagano rather than an external architect, the building adopts a brutalist aesthetic featuring exposed concrete interiors wrapped in a metallic mesh facade. The building stands at approximately 33.8 m (111 ft) in height, roughly half the maximum height allowed under local zoning regulations, and contains minimal external commercial branding.

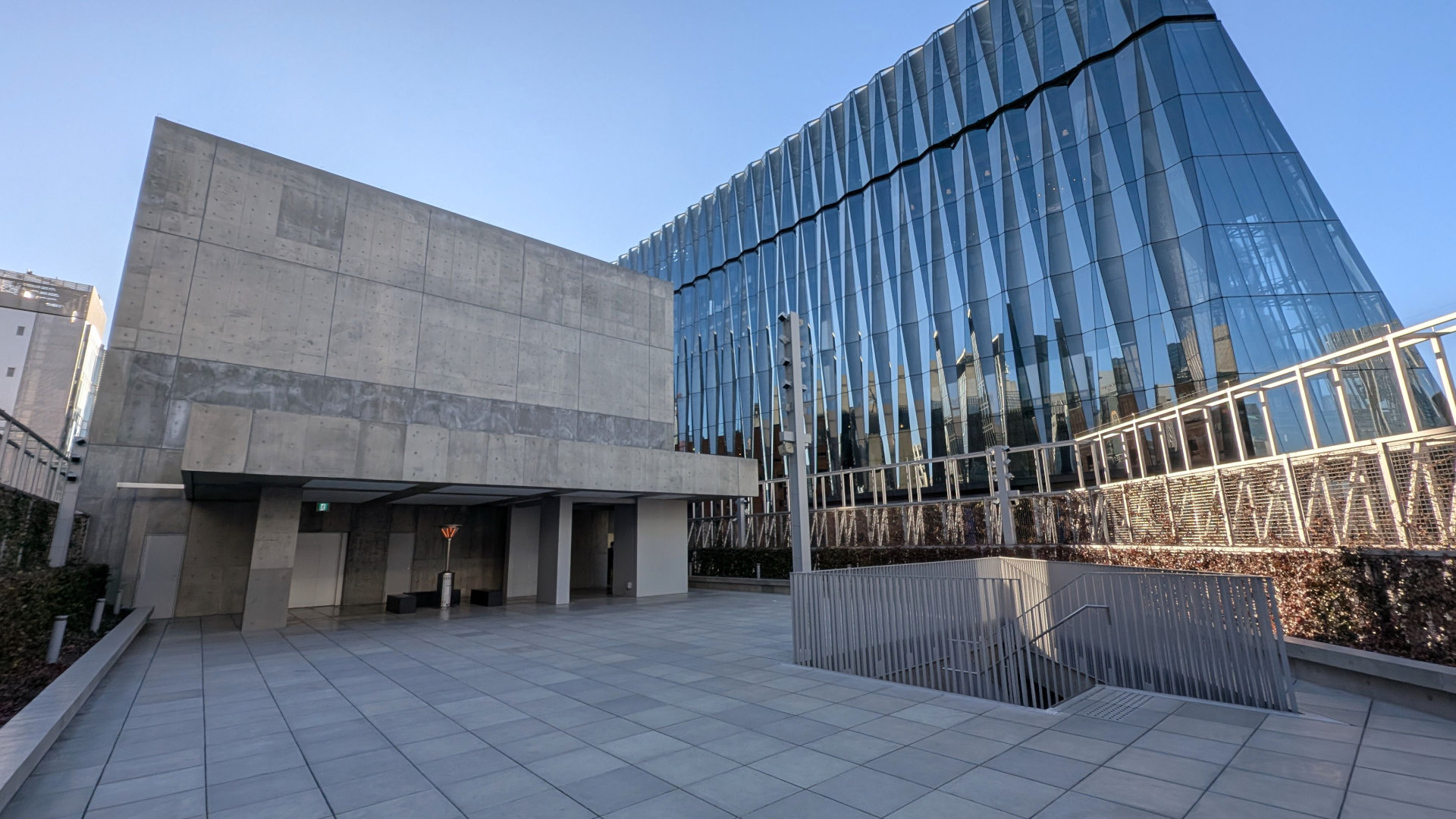
Rooftop

The layout differs from conventional urban parks by omitting natural turf and trees, defining its public utility through open architectural access. Approximately 40% of the total floor area is designated as unassigned public space available for communal use. Vertical circulation is organized around an uncovered central spiral staircase extending from the lowest basement level to an open rooftop observation platform, referencing the continuous split-level design of the 1966 structure.

The remaining 60% of the interior operates as a dynamic event space designed to host rotating cultural programs, media displays, and temporary exhibitions focused on Sony's business divisions, including music, video games, and film. The lower basement levels contain public amenities and casual dining options, with level B2 providing a direct connection to Ginza Station via exit B9. Architectural remnants of the original 1966 Yoshinobu Ashihara building were retained and integrated into the underground entrance structure.

== Location ==
It is located at the Sukiyabashi crossroads on Harumi-dori, and is accessible directly from the Ginza subway station via exit B9.

== See also ==
- Sony City
- 550 Madison Avenue, formerly known as the Sony Building in New York
