= Orchestra Ensemble Kanazawa =

Japanese professional chamber orchestra

- Native name: オーケストラ・アンサンブル金沢
- Short name: OEK
- Founded: 1988
- Location: Kanazawa, Ishikawa, Japan
- Concert hall: Ishikawa Ongakudō
- Music director: Marc Minkowski
- Website: www.oek.jp/en

The Orchestra Ensemble Kanazawa (オーケストラ・アンサンブル金沢, Ōkesutora Ansanburu Kanazawa) is a professional chamber orchestra, founded in 1988, based in Kanazawa, Ishikawa Prefecture, Japan, and is a full member of the Association of Japanese Symphony Orchestras. The orchestra's home is Ishikawa Ongakudō (Ishikawa Music Hall). Since 2018, its music director is Marc Minkowski.

== Activities ==
The orchestra performs more than 100 concerts every year.

In 2008, it performed 128 concerts including seven overseas concerts, making it the 11th largest Japanese orchestra in terms of concert revenue.

The orchestra has worked with Australian jazz drummer David Jones.

== Recognition and awards ==
In 1992, the orchestra's CD Concerto Grosso No. 1 by Schnittke and Carmen by Bizet received the Japan Record Academy Award.

In 1994, the orchestra's CD Message for 21st Century, released by Polydor Kabushiki Kaisha, received an Artistic Work Award from theAgency for Cultural Affairs of Japan. In 1995, the orchestra received the Grand Prize of Idemitsu Music Prize for 1994.

In 1995, the orchestra's CD Message for 21st Century vol. 2 received the Japan Record Academy Award.

On January 7, 2010, the orchestra's home Ishikawa Music Hall received the Internal Minister's Prize from Japan Foundation for Regional Art Activities for the collaboration with the orchestra to promote art in the region. In 2005, the orchestra's CD of Mozart piano concerto featuring pianist Yoko Kikuchi received the Music Pen Club Award.

== Directors ==
- Hiroyuki Iwaki (1988–2006)
- Michiyoshi Inoue (2007–2018)
- Marc Minkowski (2018–)

== Composer-in-residence ==
Composers-in-residence (Since 2010, named "Composer of the Year") have included:

- Toshi Ichiyanagi (1988–1991)
- Maki Ishii (1988–1991)
- Yūzō Toyama (1991–1992)
- Akira Nishimura (1992–1993)
- Joji Yuasa (1993–1995)
- Tōru Takemitsu (1995–1996)
- Toshiro Mayuzumi (1996–1997)
- Shin-ichiro Ikebe (1997–1998)
- Keiko Fujiie (1998–1999)
- Hikaru Hayashi (1999–2000)
- Tetsuji Emura (2000–2001)
- Teizo Matsumura (2001–2002)
- Akira Miyoshi (2002–2003)
- Toshirō Saruya (2003–2004)
- Atsuhiko Gondai (2004–2005)
- Lera Auerbach (2004–2005)
- Michio Mamiya (2005–2006)
- Tokuhide Niimi (2006–2007)
- Toshi Ichiyanagi (2007–2008)
- Shigeaki Saegusa (2008–2009)
- Roger Boutry (2009–2010)
- Takashi Kako (2010–2011)
- Kei Mochizuki (2011–2012)
- Unsuk Chin (2012–2014)
- Atsuhiko Gondai (2014–2015)
- Toshi Ichiyanagi (2015–2016)
- Thierry Escaich (2016–2017)
- Shin'ichirō Ikebe (2017–2018)
- Miho Hazama (2018–2019)
